= Kirkby Moor, Lincolnshire =

Coordinates: 53.1563°N 0.1706°W

Kirkby Moor
- Location within Lincolnshire
- OS grid reference: TF 22277 63232
- Shire county: Lincolnshire
- Region: East Midlands
- Country: England
- Sovereign state: United Kingdom
- Postcode district: LN
- Police: Lincolnshire
- Fire: Lincolnshire
- Ambulance: East Midlands

Kirkby Moor is an elevated area of lowland heath, woodland and farmland in central Lincolnshire between the villages of Woodhall Spa to the west and Kirkby on Bain to the east. Roughton Moor lies to the north and the former RAF Woodhall Spa and the Lincolnshire Fens beyond to the south.

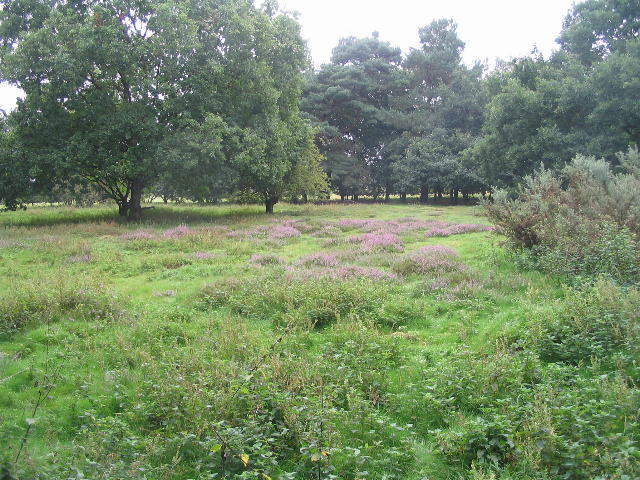
Moor Farm Nature Reserve

The area was historically covered by lowland heath and woodland, much of which remains though much of it has been converted into farmland. Large parts of the moor are now Lincolnshire Wildlife Trust nature reserves and Sites of Special Scientific Interest (SSSIs).

== History ==
=== Second World War ===
RAF Woodhall Spa was built on the southern side of the moor in 1941 on farmland and was home to the famous 617 Squadron amongst others. Aircraft from here dropped the first Tallboy bomb as well as sinking the Tirpitz battleship. Much of the auxiliary buildings, shelters and hard standings for the airfield were hidden among the trees in Ostler's Plantation with much surviving into the 21st century.

The foundations of further wartime military buildings can be found across the moor, in particular in Roughton Moor Wood and Kirkby Low Wood.

=== Post-war ===
The airfield largely closed in 1967 after homing Bloodhound missiles, though the RAF retained a small area for engine maintenance and testing until 1992. The site was retained for storage and a small golf course until it was put up for sale by the Ministry of Defence in December 2021.

=== Mustard gas discoveries ===
In 2017 three wartime memorabilia hunters discovered abandoned mustard gas canisters in Roughton Moor Wood proceeding to remove them from the site and dump them in a nearby pond in Stixwould ten days later. The trio later received jail sentences for chemical weapons offences.

It is believed that the mustard gas canisters were buried and abandoned after the war when forces withdrew from the area. A subsequent clean-up operation was conducted by specialists from Porton Down and the MoD, costing around £300,000.

== Geography ==
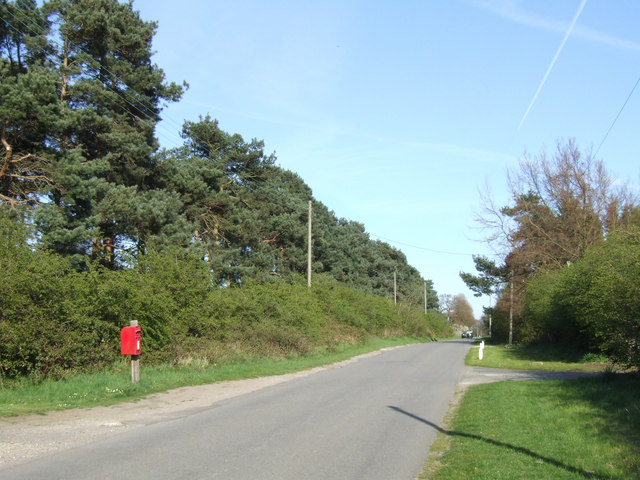
Kirkby Lane running across Kirkby Moor near the turning for Wellsyke Lane.

The moor lies on an elevated finger of land between a stream known as Woodhall Sewer (not an actual sewer) to the east and the River Bain and its valley to the west, with the highest point at around 27m above sea level at Fox Hill (not an actual fox).

Two road bisect the moor, with Moor Road/Kirkby Lane running east–west and Wellsyke Lane branching off it heading north to Roughton and Martin Moors.

Much of the area of the moor is now covered by Ostler's Plantation woodland owned by the Forestry Commission and open to the public.

== Nature reserves ==
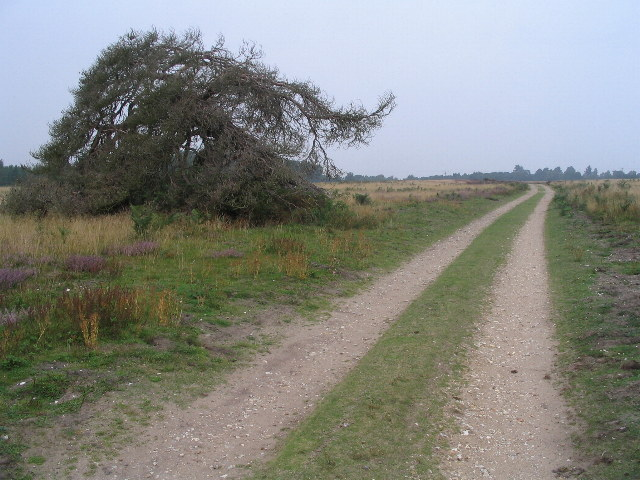
Kirkby Moor Nature Reserve

Four nature reserves exist on the moor, all managed by the Lincolnshire Wildlife Trust:

=== Kirkby Moor Nature Reserve ===
Located to the south of Kirkby Lane, an area of open lowland heath.

=== Roughton Moor Wood Nature Reserve ===
Located towards the western edge of the moor, a mixture of coniferous and deciduous woodland.

=== Woodhall Spa Airfield Nature Reserve ===
Formerly RAF Woodhall Spa, bought by the LWT in 2015.

=== Moor Farm Nature Reserve ===
Located in the middle of the moor to the west of Wellsyke Lane.

== See also ==
- Woodhall Spa
- Kirkby on Bain
- Roughton
- River Bain
- Ostler's Plantation
- RAF Woodhall Spa
