= List of forests and woodland in Lincolnshire =

This is a list of forests and woodland in Lincolnshire, England.

Name	Location (Parish)	Owner
Big Rous Holt	Roughton	
Haltham Coppice	Tumby	
Haltham Wood	Haltham	
Highall Wood	Stixwould and Woodhall	
High Dar Wood	Stixwould and Woodhall	
Little Rous Holt	Roughton	
Low Dar Wood	Stixwould and Woodhall	
Ostler's Plantation	Kirkby on Bain	Forestry Commission
Roughton Scrubs	Roughton	
Wellsyke Wood	Kirkby on Bain	
