= Bungalow =

Small house or cottage

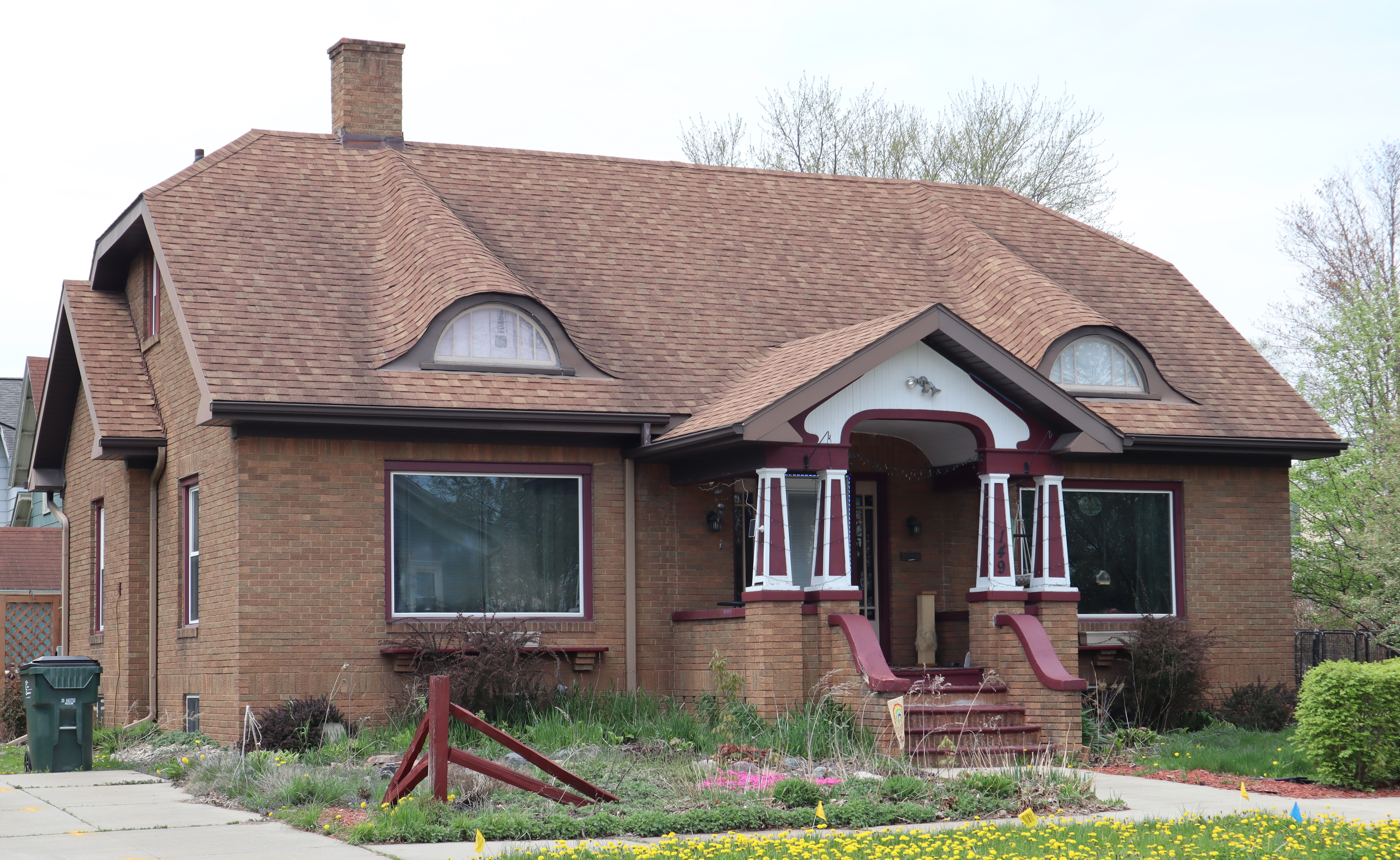
Brown brick bungalow with roof windows in Reedsburg, Wisconsin, U.S.

A bungalow is a small house or cottage that is typically single- or one-and-a-half-storey. If a smaller upper storey exists, then it is frequently set in the roof and windows that come out from the roof. It may be surrounded by wide verandas.

The first house in England that was classified as a bungalow was built in 1869.

The term bungalow is derived from the word Bangla and used elliptically to mean "a house in the Bengal style".

In the U.S., bungalows were first built as vacation homes, and were most popular between 1900 and 1918, especially with the Arts and Crafts movement. The style quickly developed into its own class of residential architecture whose ancestors include the Prairie School and American Craftsman.

Different U.S. cities and regions in the early-to-mid twentieth century, from California to Chicago to New York, developed styles of bungalows unique to their geography, climate, landscape and social milieu. Organizations continue to celebrate the style, including the Kansas City Bungalow Club and the Twin Cities Bungalow Club.

The popularity of the American movement was spearheaded by the Sears, Roebuck & Co.'s hugely popular mail-order Modern Homes program between 1908 and 1940. The company sold precut house kits, including many affordable, stylish Craftsman bungalows, shipped by rail to ordinary Americans, making homeownership accessible with unique financing and standardized, attractive designs that became iconic of the era's middle-class aspirations.

One Massachusetts architect poked fun at the fashionable homebuilding movement in the article "The Rampant Craze for the Bungle-oh". Another wrote a poem, "Bungal-Ode".

== Design considerations ==
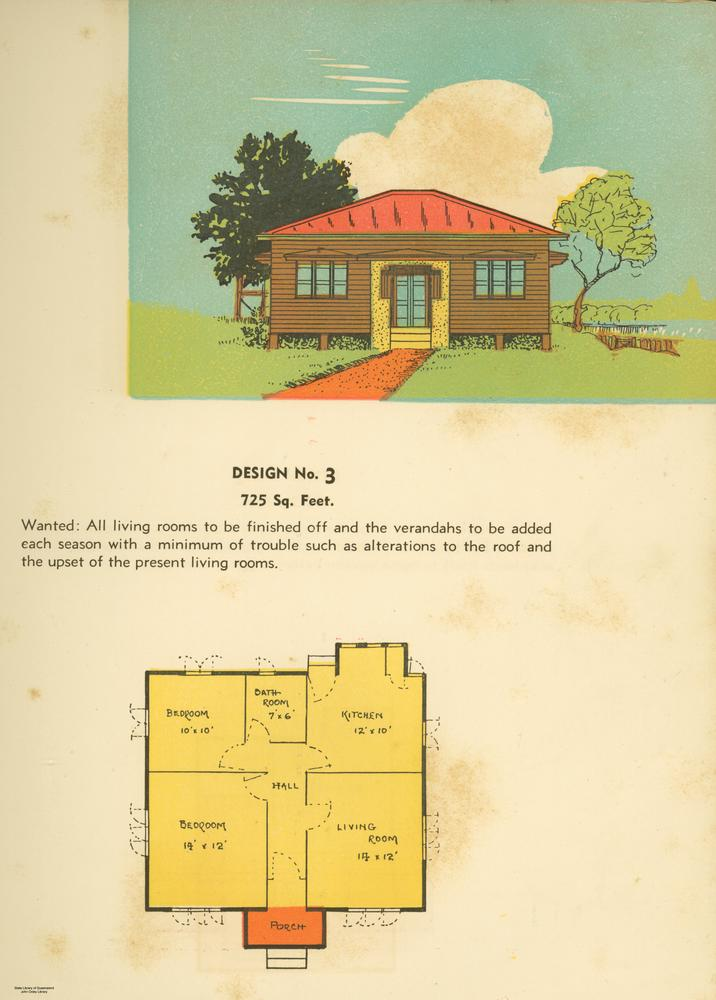
Elevation and floor plan of an Australian bungalow-style residence, 1939.

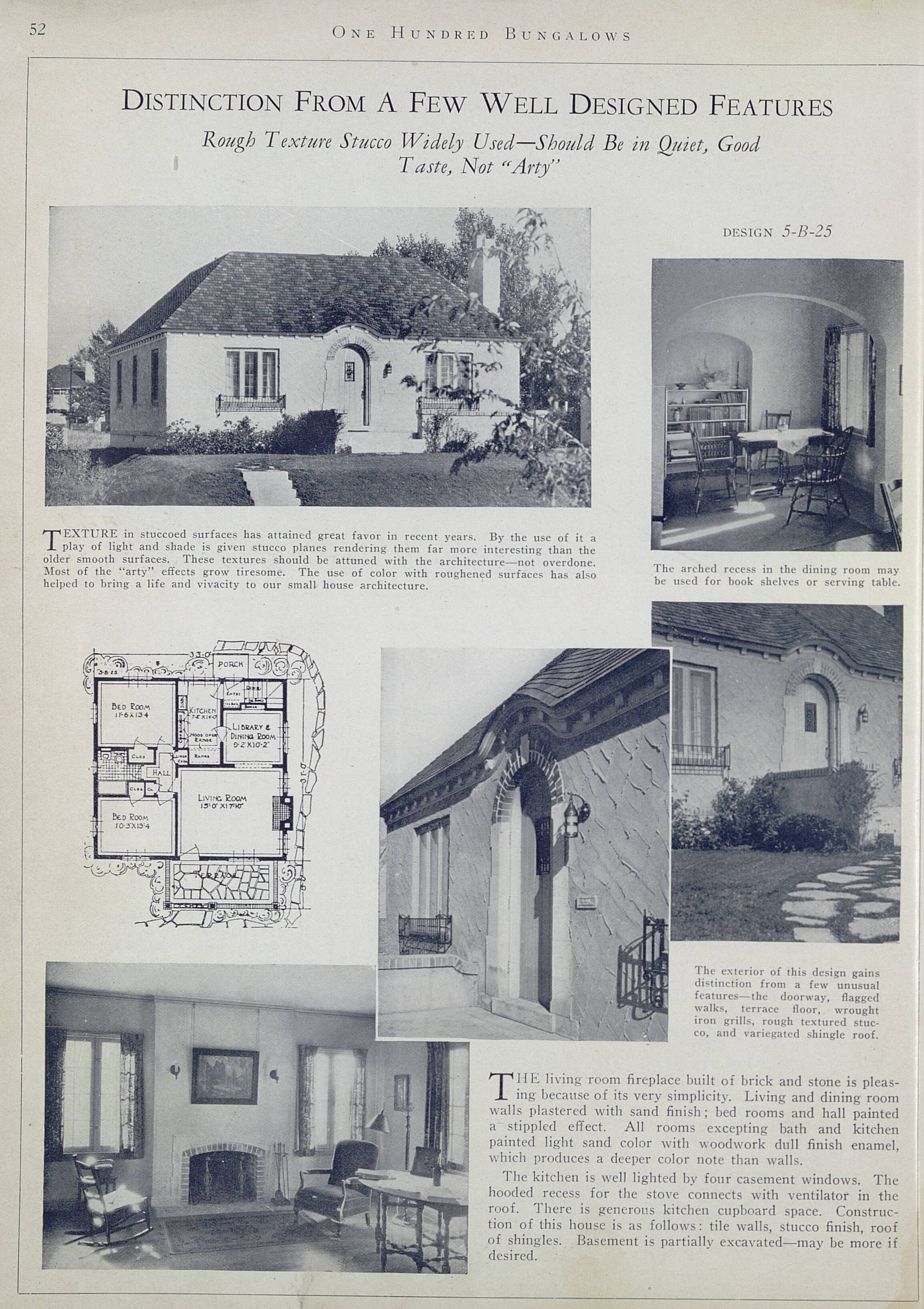
From "100 Bungalows of Architectural Distinction" by the Architects' Small House Service Bureau of the United States, 1927.

Since most bungalows contain all living areas on a single storey without stairs, they can be well-suited to persons with impaired mobility, such as the elderly or those using wheelchairs.

Neighbourhoods of only bungalows offer more privacy than similar neighbourhoods with two-storey houses. As bungalows are one or one-and-a-half storeys, strategically planted trees and shrubs are usually sufficient to block the view of neighbours. With two-storey houses, the extra height requires much taller trees to accomplish the same, and it may not be practical to place such tall trees close to the building. Bungalows provide cost-effective residences. On the other hand, even closely spaced bungalows make for quite low-density neighbourhoods, contributing to urban sprawl. In Australia, bungalows have broad verandas to shade the interior from intense sun, but as a result, they are often excessively dark inside, requiring artificial light even in daytime.

=== Cost and space considerations ===
On a per-area basis, bungalows are more expensive to construct than two-storey houses, because the same foundation and roof are required for a smaller living area.

Although the footprint of a bungalow is often a simple rectangle, any foundation is theoretically possible. For bungalows with brick walls, the windows are often positioned high, and are close to the roof. This architectural technique avoids the need for special arches or lintels to support the brick wall above the windows, however, in two-storey houses, there is a need for such support.

== By region ==
=== Australia ===
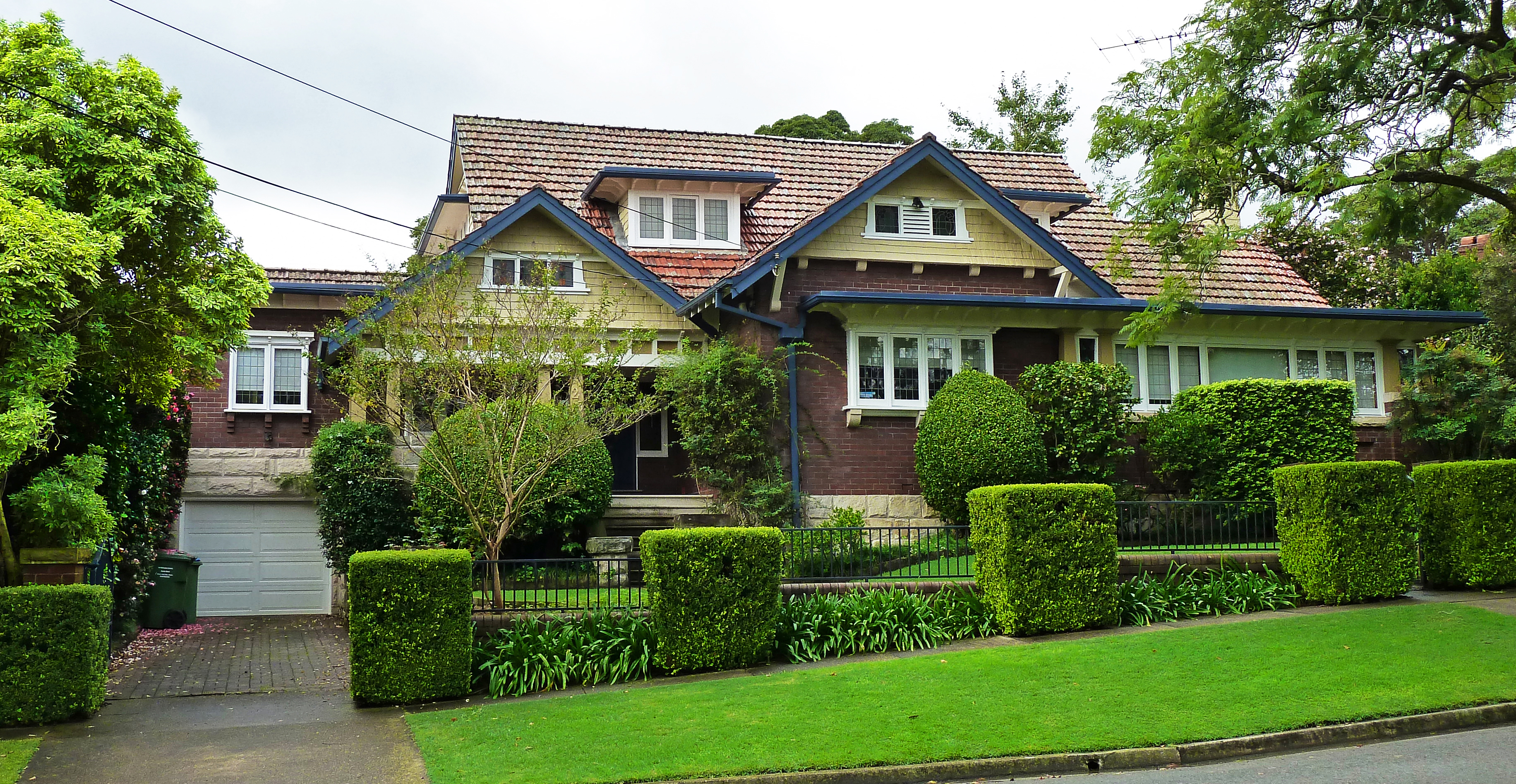
A California-bungalow-style house in the Sydney suburb of Lindfield

From 1891, the Federation Bungalow style swept across Australia, first in Camberwell, Victoria, and through Sydney's northern suburbs after 1895. The developer Richard Stanton built in the Federation Bungalow style first in Haberfield, New South Wales, the first Garden Suburb (1901), and then in Rosebery, New South Wales (1912). Beecroft, Hornsby, and Lindfield contain many examples of Federation Bungalows built between 1895 and 1920.

From about 1908 to the 1930s, the California bungalow style was very popular in Australia with a rise of interest in single-family homes and planned urban communities. The style first saw widespread use in the suburbs of Sydney. It then spread throughout the Australian states and New Zealand.

In South Australia, the suburb of Colonel Light Gardens contains many well-preserved bungalow developments.

=== Bangladesh ===
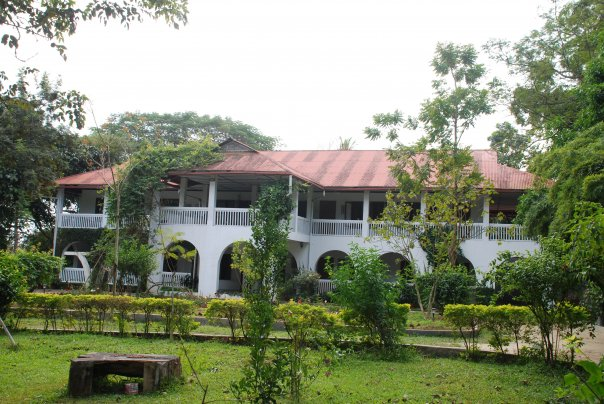
A very traditional bungalow in Sylhet, Bangladesh

In rural Bangladesh, the concept is often called Bangla ghar ("Bengali-style house") and remains popular. The main construction material is corrugated steel sheets or red clay tiles, while past generations used wood, bamboo, and straw. In houses that used straw as a roof, it was used for keeping the house cooler during hot summer days.

The dak bungalows were formerly used by the British mail services during the British Raj period in Bengal.

=== Canada ===
Canada uses bungalow to mean a single-family dwelling that is one storey high.

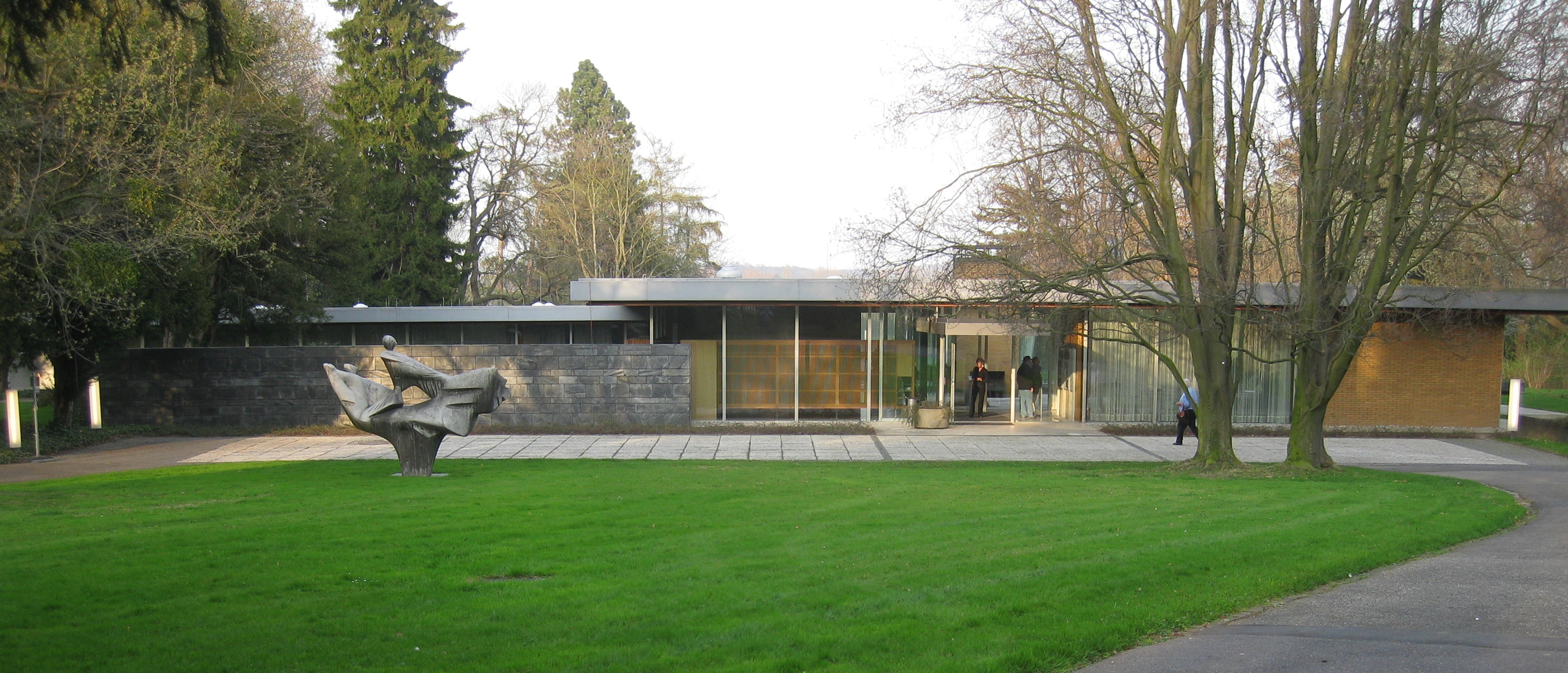
Kanzlerbungalow by Sep Ruf, from 1964 to 1999 the residence of the Chancellor of the Federal Republic of Germany in Bonn

=== Germany ===
In Germany, bungalow refers to a single-storey house with a flat roof. This building style was most popular during the 1960s. The two criteria are mentioned in contemporary literature, e.g., Landhaus und Bungalow by Klara Trost (1961).

=== India ===
In India, the term bungalow or villa refers to any single-family unit, as opposed to an apartment building, which is the norm for Indian middle-class city living. The normal custom for an Indian bungalow is one storey, but as time progressed, many families built larger two-storey houses to accommodate humans and pets. The area with bungalows built in the 1920s–30s in New Delhi is now known as Lutyens' Bungalow Zone and is an architectural heritage area. In Bandra, a suburb of India's commercial capital Mumbai, numerous colonial-era bungalows exist; they are threatened by removal and replacement of ongoing development.

In a distinctly utilitarian usage, the dak bungalow was formerly used by circuit-riding British jurists (and other officials such as the mailman), as well as quotidian private citizens; the most substantial dak bungalows have been converted into local governmental buildings and the like. The vast majority, however, were the most sparse of lodgings.

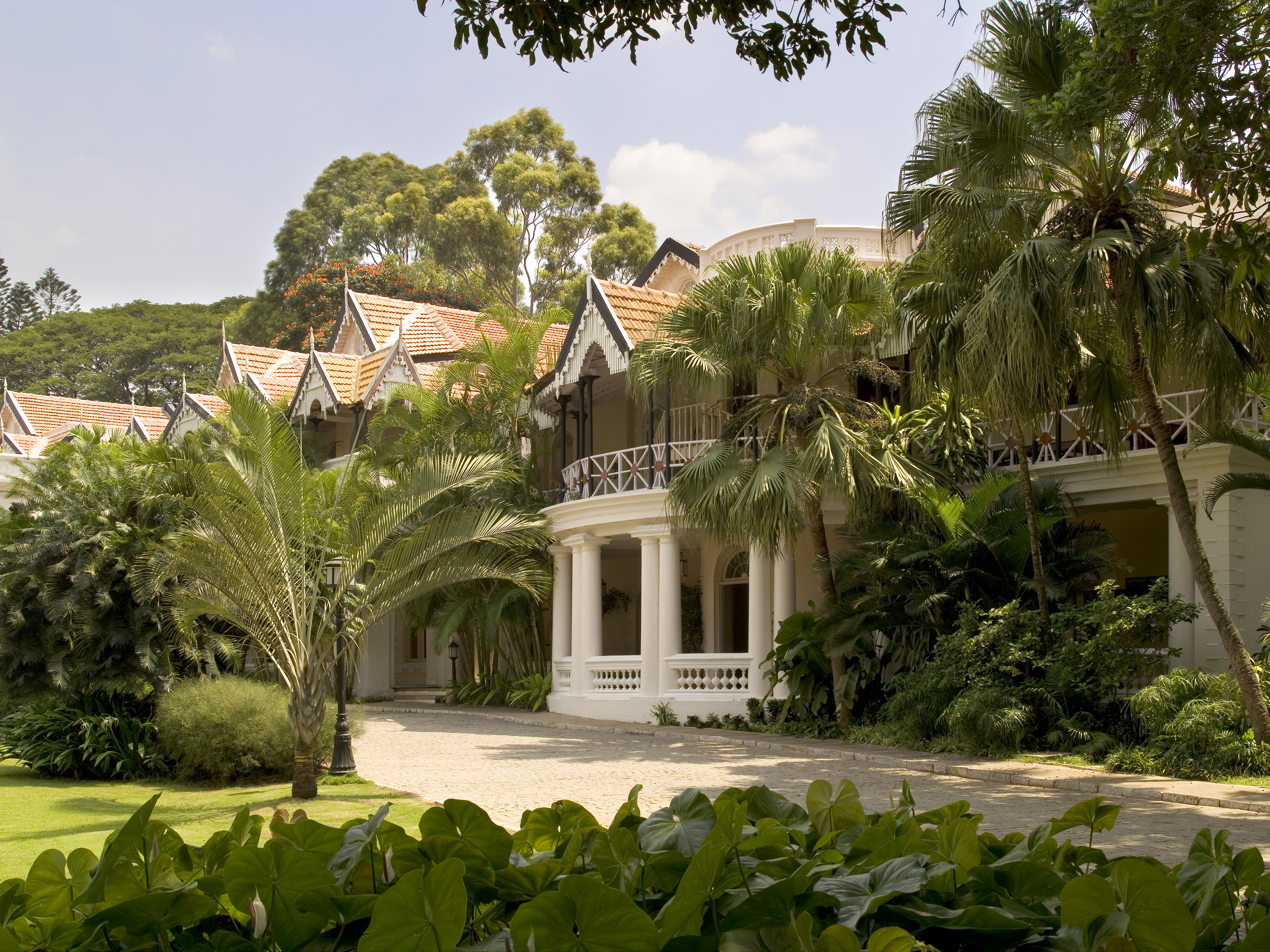
A modern Indian bungalow in an affluent area near Bangalore, Karnataka, India

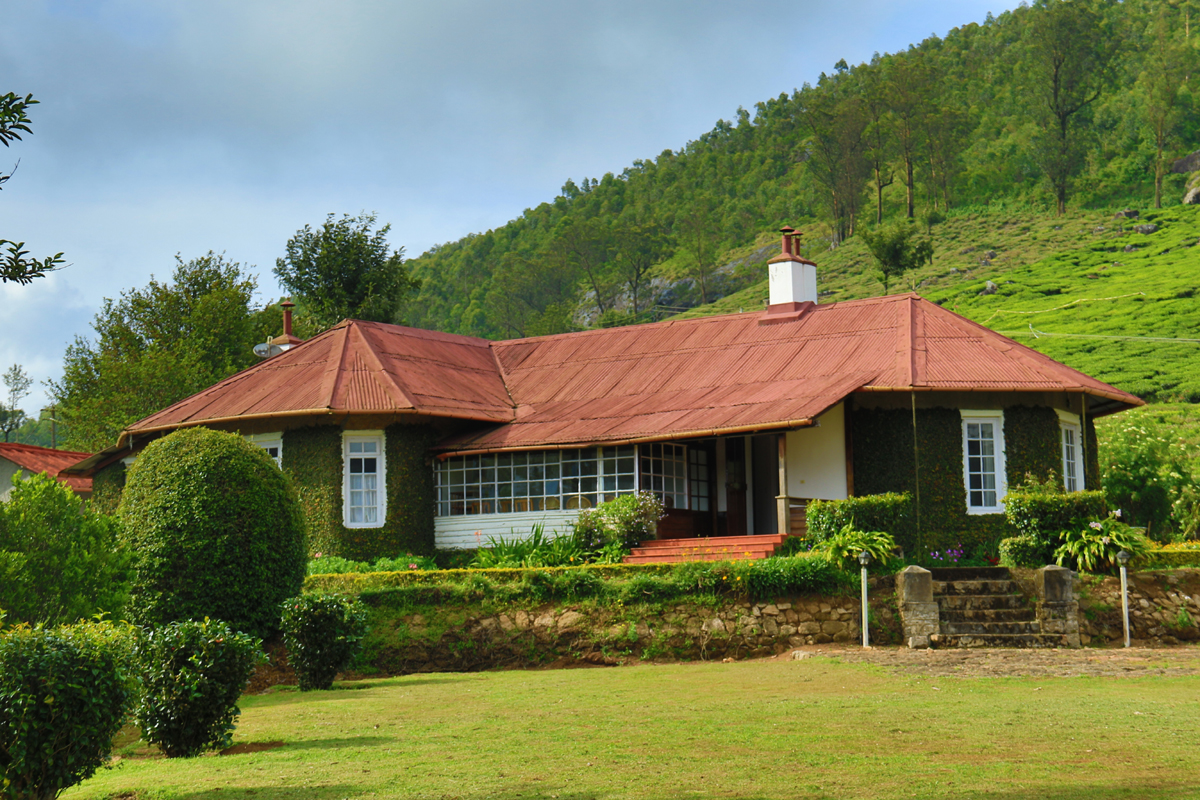
The Manale Tea Bungalow, one of the oldest bungalows in Kerala, India

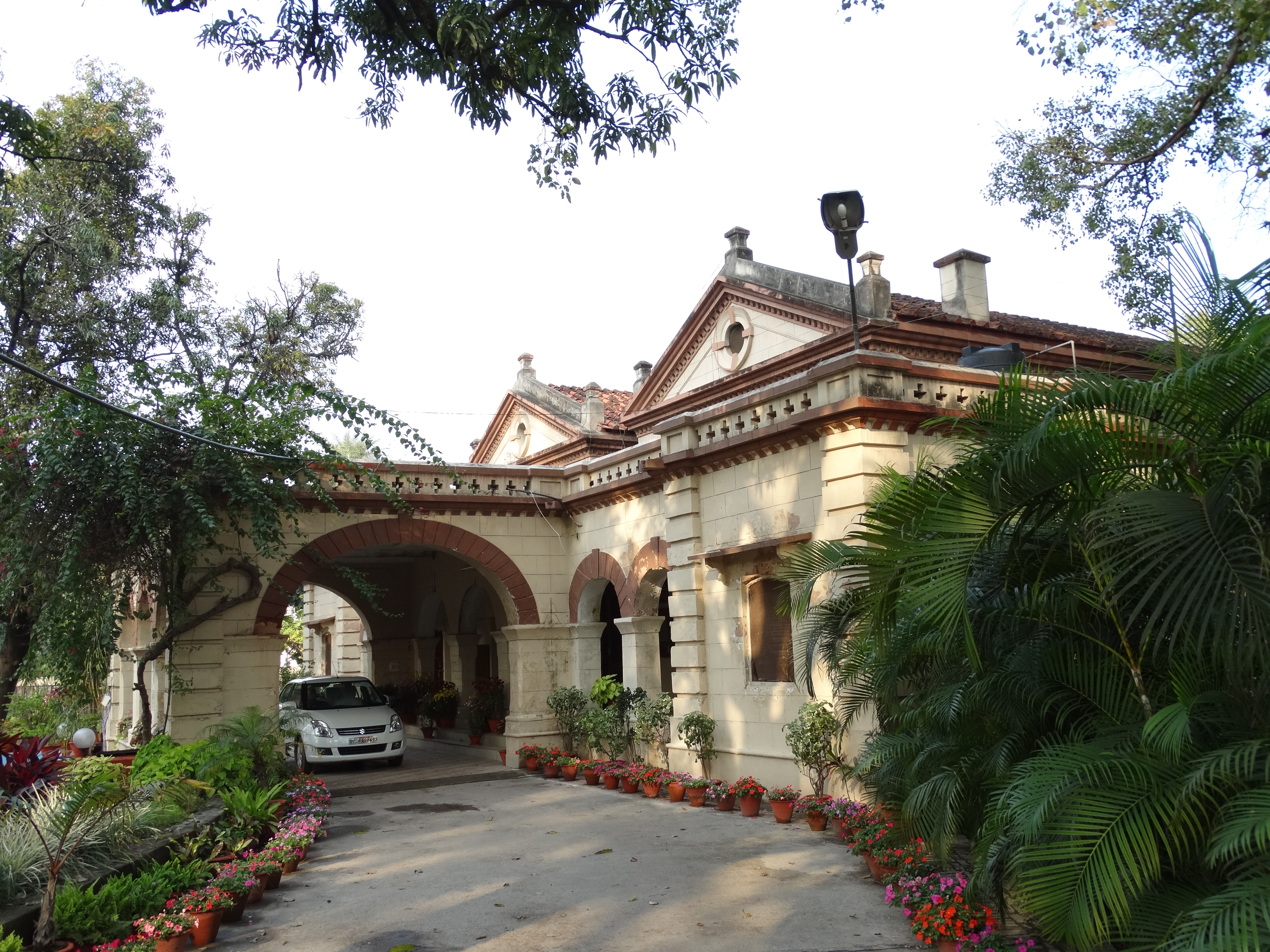
Colonial-era-style Bungalow in Prayagraj, India

=== Ireland ===
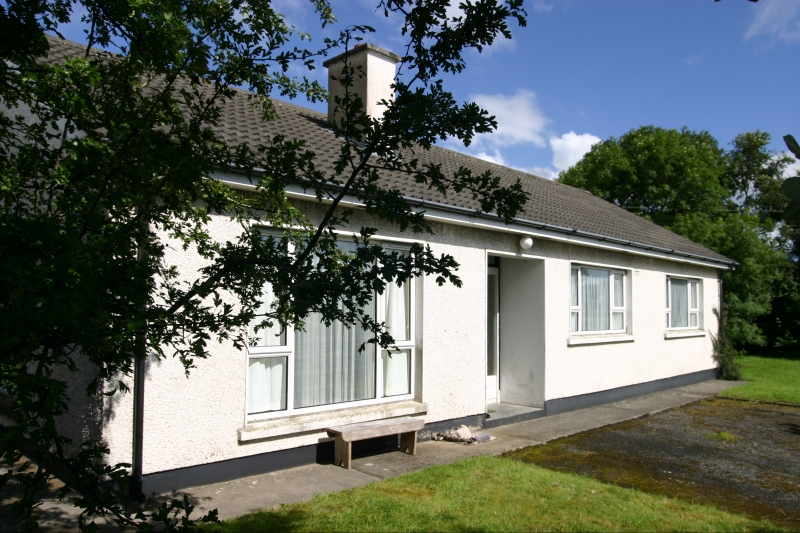
A typical small bungalow near Moville, County Donegal, in Ireland

The bungalow is the most common type of house built in the Irish countryside. During the Celtic Tiger years of the late 20th century, single-storey bungalows declined as a type of new construction, and residents built more two-storey or dormer bungalows. There was a trend in both the Republic of Ireland and Northern Ireland of people moving into rural areas and buying their own plots of land. Often these plots were large, so a one-storey bungalow was quite practical, particularly for retirees.

=== Singapore and Malaysia ===
In Singapore and Malaysia, the term bungalow is sometimes used to refer to a house that was built during the colonial era. The structures were constructed "from the early 19th century until the end of World War II." They were built by the British to house their "military officers, High Court judges and other members of the colonial society's great and good."

At present, there is still a high demand for colonial-era bungalows in Singapore and Malaysia. Most of the units are used as residences. Over the years, some have been transformed into offices, hotels, galleries, spas, and restaurants.

In the post-colonial period, the term bungalow has been adapted and used to refer to any stand-alone residence, regardless of size, architectural style, or era in which it was built. Calling a house a bungalow often carries with it connotations of the price and status of the residence, and thus the wealth of its owner. Local real estate lingo commonly includes the word "bungalow" when referring to residences that are more normally described as "detached", "single-family homes", or even "mansions" in other countries. The pervasiveness of the word in the local jargon has resulted in bungalow being imported into the Malay language as the word banglo with the same meaning.

In Singapore, large luxurious mansions in exclusive areas are referred to as Good Class Bungalows.

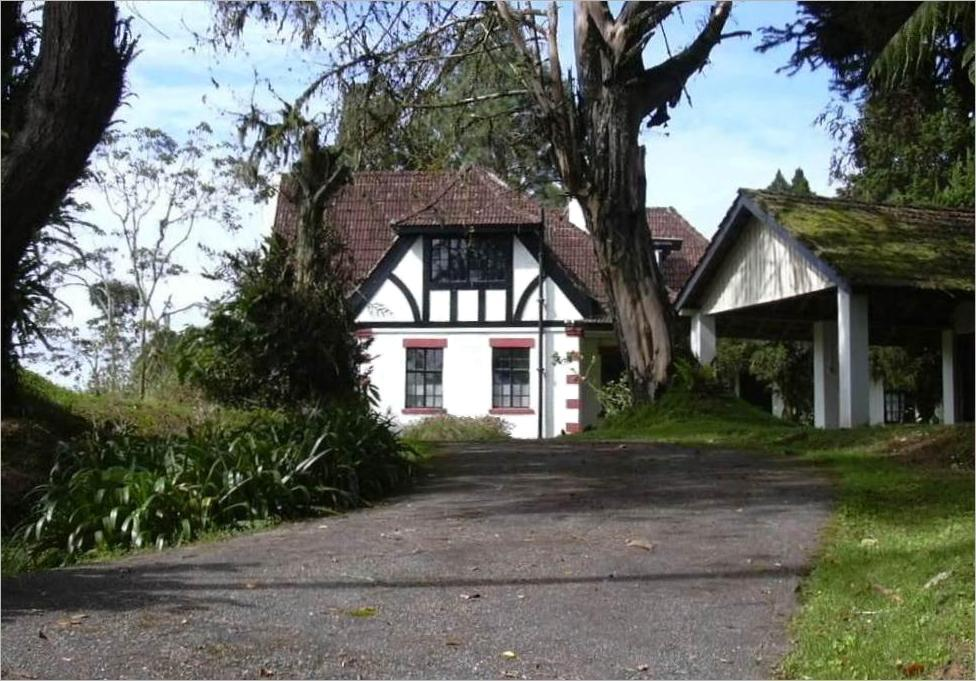
"Moonlight" bungalow (now known as the Jim Thompson cottage) is a mock Tudor-styled mansion located in the Cameron Highlands, Pahang, Malaysia. The pre-war house is still a draw for the many who have had an interest in the mysterious disappearance of Jim Thompson in the Cameron Highlands.

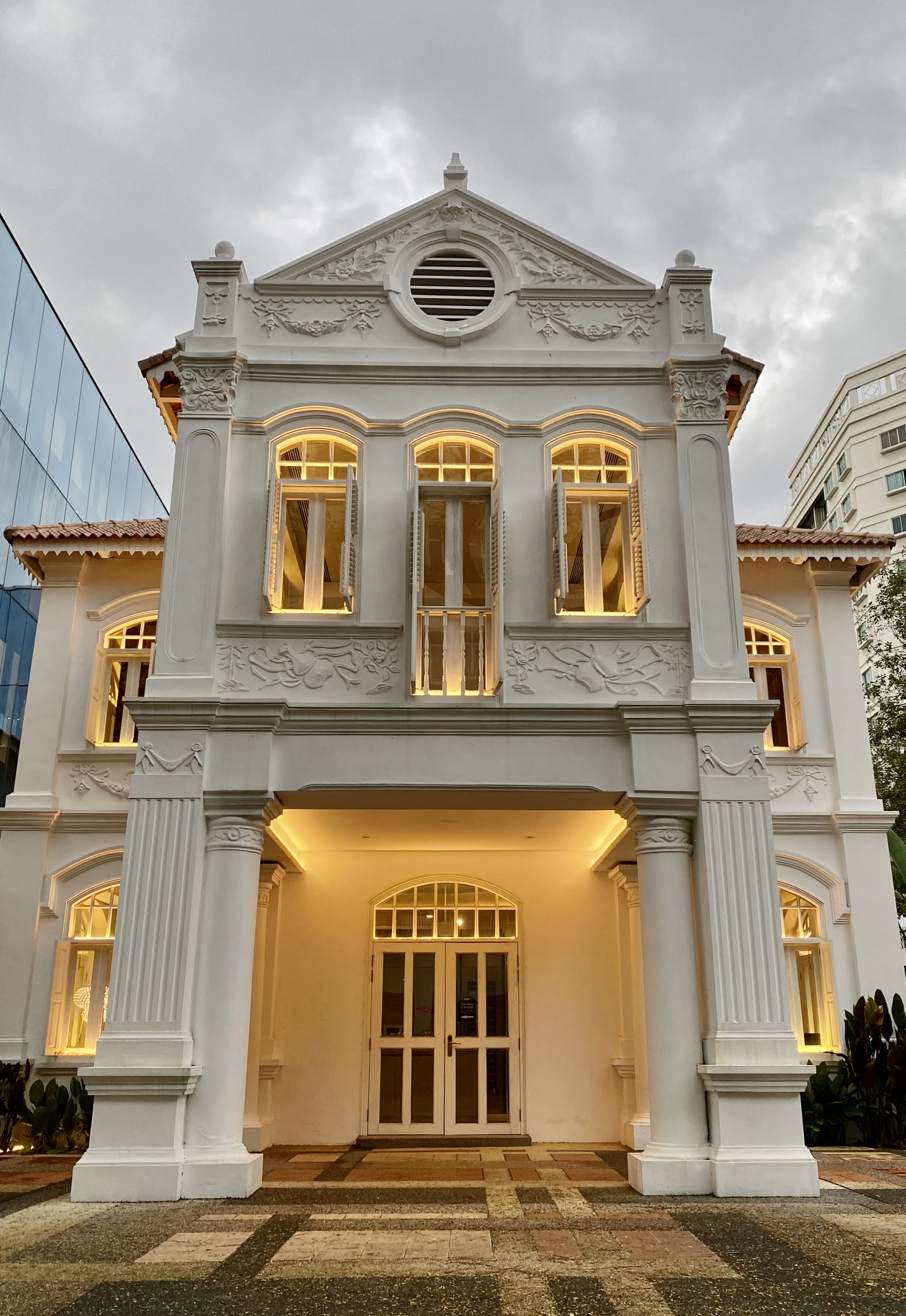
A heritage bungalow located in the heart of Singapore's civic district. Today, the bungalow serves as part of an "urban plaza" where upmarket furnishings from Europe and America are promoted.

=== South Africa ===
In South Africa, the term bungalow refers to a single-storey, detached house. It may be implied that it is a temporary residence, such as a holiday home or student housing.

=== United Kingdom ===
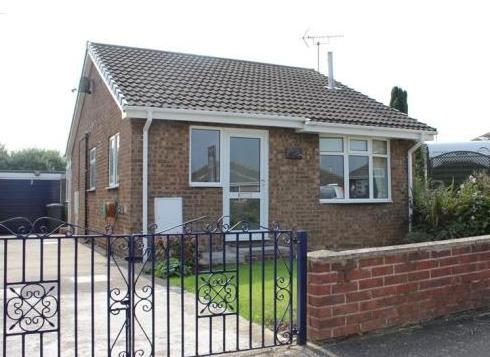
Bungalow in Britain

The first two bungalows in England were built in Westgate-on-Sea in 1869 or 1870. A bungalow was a prefabricated single-storey building used as a seaside holiday home. Manufacturers included Boulton & Paul Ltd, who made corrugated iron bungalows as advertised in their 1889 catalogue, which were erected by their men on the purchaser's light brickwork foundation. Examples include Woodhall Spa Cottage Museum, and Castle Bungalow at Peppercombe, North Devon, owned by the Landmark Trust; it was built by Boulton and Paul in the 1920s. Construction of this type of bungalow peaked towards the end of the decade, to be replaced by brick construction.

Bungalows became popular in the United Kingdom between the two World Wars, and very large numbers were built, particularly in coastal resorts, giving rise to the pejorative adjective "bungaloid", first found in the Daily Express from 1927: "Hideous allotments and bungaloid growth make the approaches to any city repulsive". Many villages and seaside resorts have large estates of 1960s bungalows, usually occupied by retired people. The typical 1930s bungalow is square in plan, with those of the 1960s more likely to be oblong. It is rare for the term "bungalow" to be used in British English to denote a dwelling having other than a single storey, or one adapted from a single-storey building, in which case "chalet bungalow" (see below) is used.

== Styles ==
=== Airplane bungalow ===
Although stylistically related to others, the special characteristic of the airplane bungalow was its single room on a second storey, surrounded by windows, designed as a sleeping room in summer weather with all-around access to breezes. This variant developed in California in the 1910s, had appeared in El Paso, Texas, by April 1916, and became most prevalent in the western half of the U.S. and southwestern and western Canada.

=== American Craftsman bungalow ===
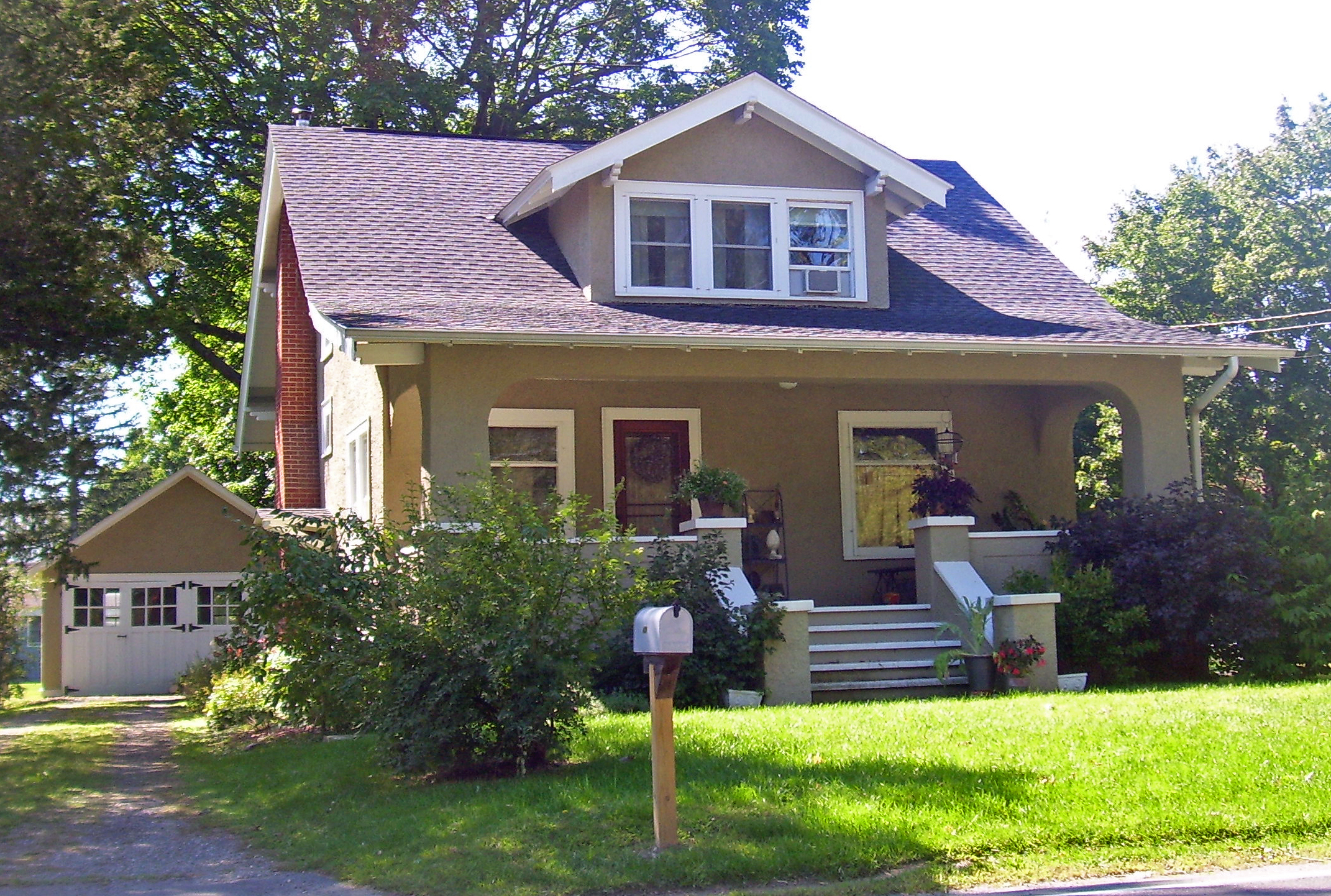
The Harriet Phillips Bungalow, an American Craftsman bungalow in Claverack, New York

The American Craftsman bungalow typified styles of the American Arts and Crafts movement, with common features usually including low-pitched roof lines on a gabled or hipped roof, deeply overhanging eaves, exposed rafters or decorative brackets under the eaves, and a front porch or veranda beneath an extension of the main roof.

Sears Company and The Aladdin Company were two of the manufacturing companies that produced pre-fab kits and sold them from catalogues for construction on sites during the turn of the 20th century.

=== Bungalow colony ===
A special use of the term bungalow developed in the greater New York City area, between the 1930s and 1960s, to denote a cluster of small rental summer homes, usually in the Catskill Mountains in the area known as the Borscht Belt. First- and second-generation Jewish-American families were especially likely to rent such houses. The old bungalow colonies continue to exist in the Catskills, and are occupied today chiefly by Orthodox Jewish families. Some of them have also been converted into Buddhist and Hindu retreats, leading to a revival of the area.

=== California bungalow ===
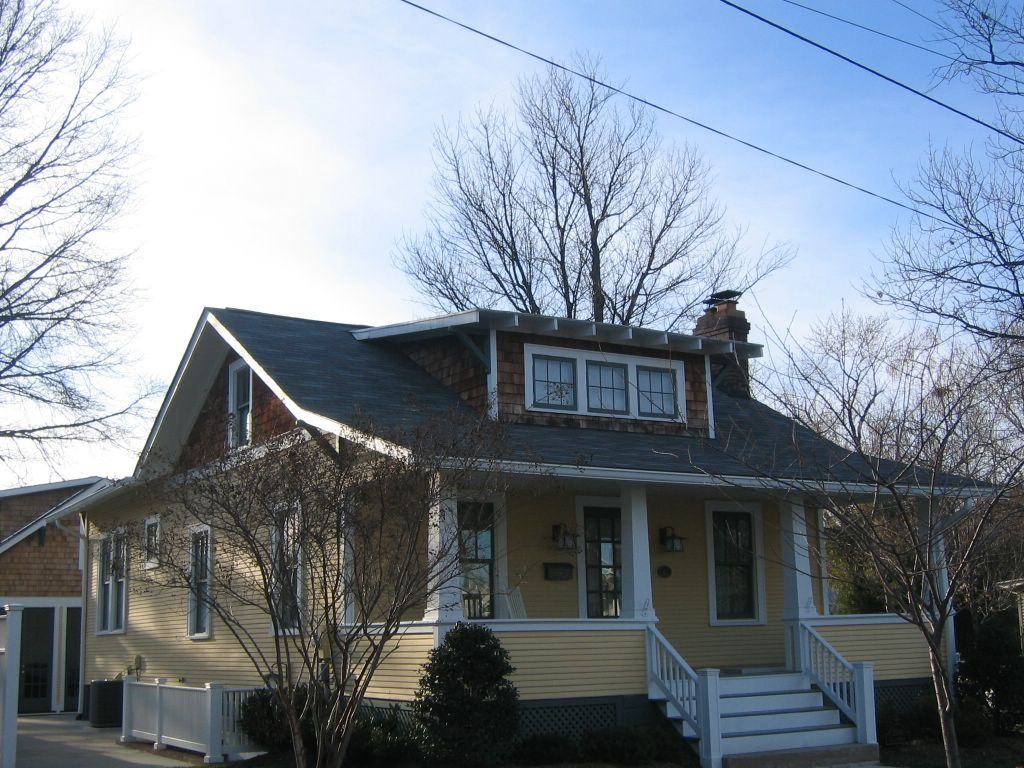
California bungalow

The California bungalow was a widely popular 1 1/2-storey variation on the bungalow in the United States from 1910 to 1925. It was also widely popular in Australia in the period 1910–1940.

=== Chalet bungalow ===
A chalet bungalow is a bungalow with a second-storey loft. The loft may be extra space over the garage. It is often space to the side of a great room with a vaulted ceiling area. The building is marketed as a bungalow with a loft because the main living areas of the house are on one floor. All the convenience of single-floor living still applies, and the loft is not expected to be accessed on a daily basis.

Some have extra bedrooms in the loft or attic area. Such buildings are really one-and-a-half storeys and not bungalows, and are referred to in British English as "chalet bungalows" or as "dormer bungalows". "Chalet bungalow" is also used in British English for where the area enclosed within the pitched roof contains rooms, even if this comprises a large part of the living area and is fully integrated into the fabric of the property.

True bungalows do not use the attic. Because the attic is not used, the roof pitch can be quite shallow, constrained only by snow-load considerations.

=== Chicago bungalow ===
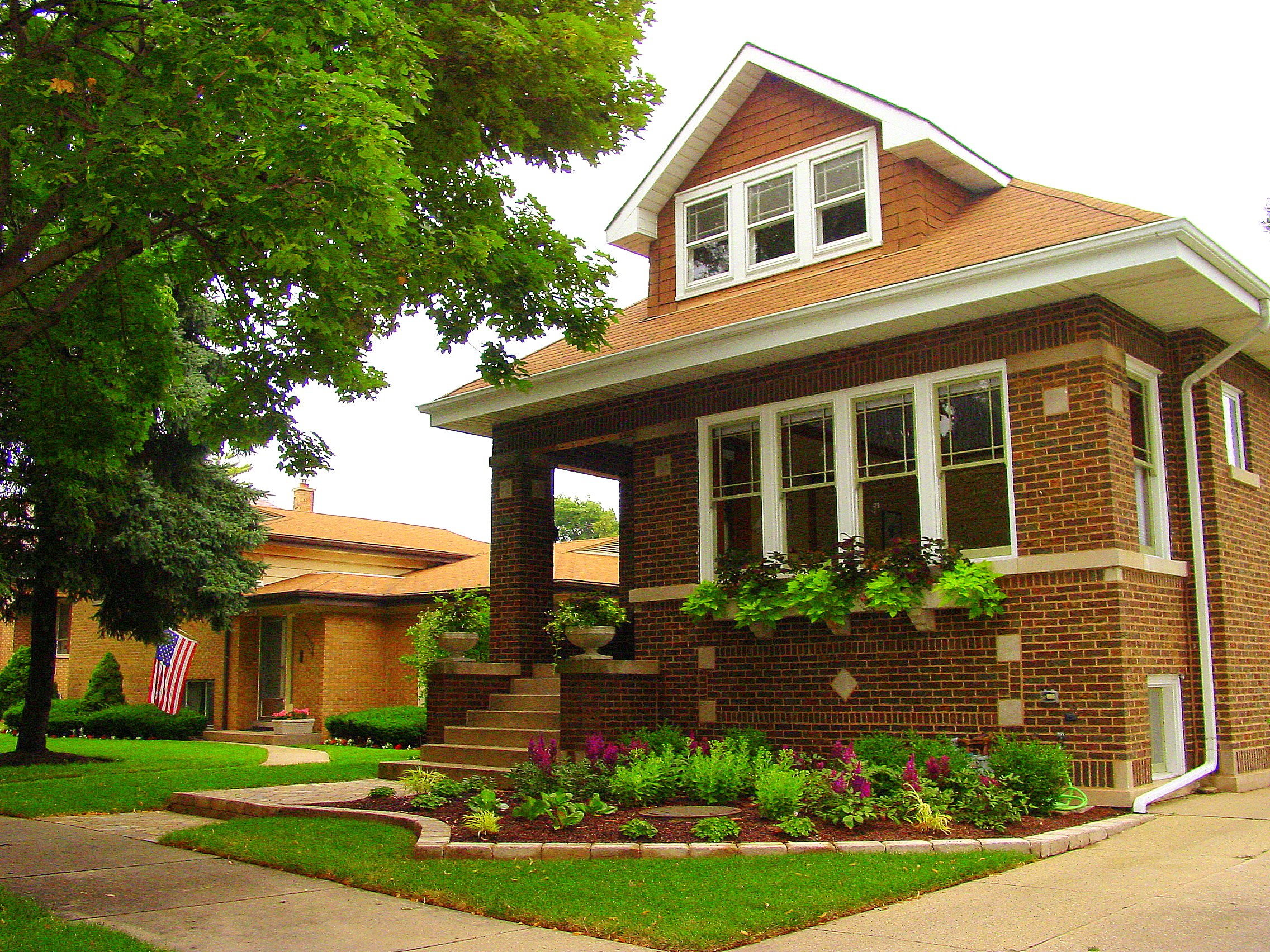
A 1925 Chicago bungalow

The majority of Chicago bungalows were built between 1910 and 1940. They were typically constructed of brick (some including decorative accents), with one-and-a-half stories and a full basement. With more than 80,000 bungalows, the style represents nearly one-third of Chicago's single-family housing stock. One primary difference between the Chicago bungalow and other types is that the gables are parallel to the street, rather than perpendicular. Like many other local houses, Chicago bungalows are relatively narrow, being an average of 20 feet (6.1 m) wide on a standard 24-foot (7.3 m) or 25-foot-wide (7.6 m) city lot. Their veranda (porch) may either be open or partially enclosed (if enclosed, it may further be used to extend the interior rooms).

=== Michigan bungalow ===
There are numerous examples of Arts and Crafts bungalows built from 1910 to 1925 in the metro-Detroit area, including Royal Oak, Pleasant Ridge, Hazel Park, Highland Park, and Ferndale. Keeping in line with the principles of the Arts and Crafts movement, the bungalows were constructed using local building materials.

=== Milwaukee bungalow ===
A large fraction of the older residential buildings in Milwaukee, Wisconsin, are bungalows in a similar Arts and Crafts style to those of Chicago, but usually with the gable perpendicular to the street. Also, many Milwaukee bungalows have white stucco on the lower portions of their exteriors.

=== Overwater bungalow ===
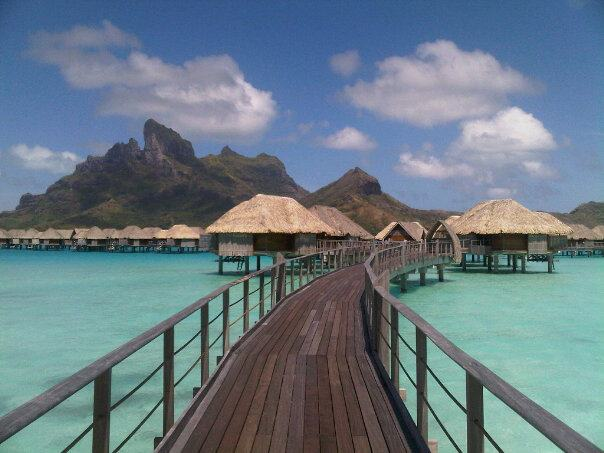
Tourist water villas in French Polynesia

The overwater bungalow is a form of (mainly high-end) tourist accommodation inspired by the traditional stilt houses of South Asia and the Pacific. The first overwater bungalows were constructed on the French Polynesian island of Ra'iātea in 1967 by three American hotel owners, Jay Carlisle, Donald McCallum, and Hugh Kelley.

They had wanted to attract tourists to Ra'iātea, and to their hotel, but the island had no real beaches, so to overcome this handicap, they decided to build hotel rooms directly on the water using large wooden poles. They called these structures overwater bungalows, and they were an immediate success.

By the seventies, tourism to French Polynesia and the Pacific Islands in general was booming, and overwater bungalows, sometimes by then called water villas, became synonymous with the region, particularly for honeymoons and romantic getaways. Soon this new tradition spread to many other parts of Asia, the Maldives being the best example, and other parts of the world, including, in the last twenty years, many parts of the Caribbean. The first overwater bungalow resort in Mexico opened in 2016.

Their proliferation would have been much greater but for the fact that overwater bungalows need certain conditions to be structurally viable; in particular, the water surrounding them needs to be consistently very calm, ideally the type of water that can be found in the lagoons and atolls of the Maldives or Bora Bora, or, at the very least, that of an extremely sheltered bay. Therefore, despite their popularity, they still remain something of a touristic novelty.

=== Raised bungalow ===
A raised bungalow is one in which the basement is partially above ground. The benefit is that more light can enter the basement with above-ground windows in the basement. A raised bungalow typically has a foyer at ground level that is halfway between the first floor and the basement. Thus, it further has the advantage of creating a foyer with a very high ceiling without the expense of raising the roof or creating a skylight. Raised bungalows often have the garage in the basement. Because the basement is not that deep, and the ground must slope downward away from the building, the slope of the driveway is quite shallow. This avoids the disadvantage of steep driveways found in most other basement garages. Bungalows without basements can still be raised, but the advantages of raising the bungalow are much less.

=== Ranch bungalow ===
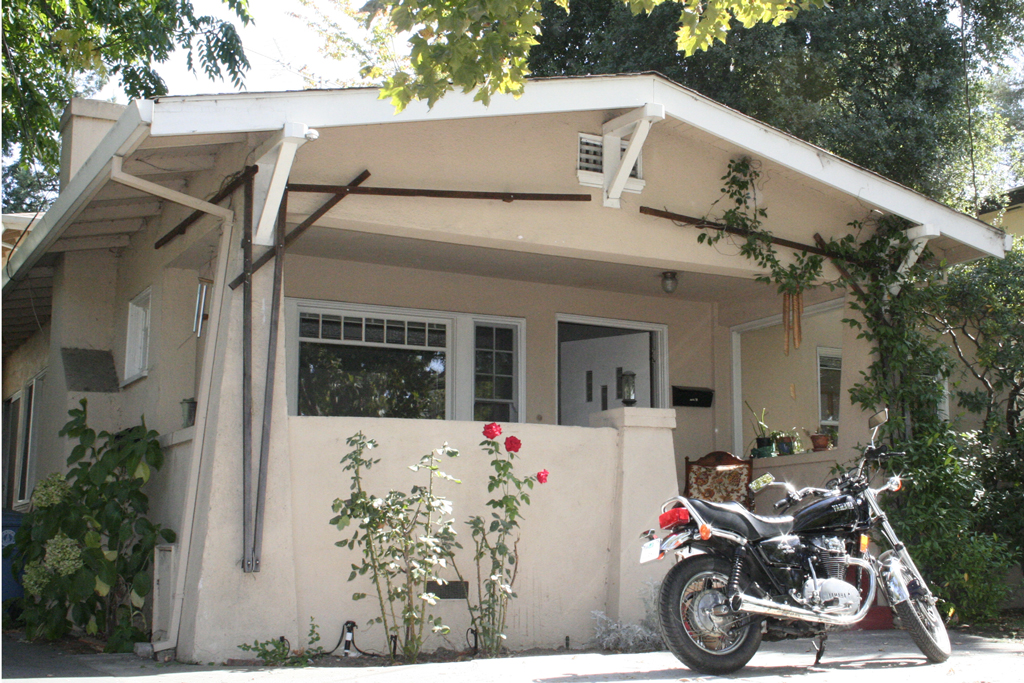
Ranch bungalow in Palo Alto, California, United States

A ranch bungalow is a bungalow organized so that bedrooms are on one side and public areas (kitchen, living/dining/family rooms) are on the other side. If there is an attached garage, the garage is on the public side of the building so that a direct entrance is possible, when this is allowed by legislation. On narrower lots, public areas are at the front of the building, and such an organization is typically not called a "ranch bungalow". Such buildings are often smaller and have only two bedrooms in the back as required.

== See also ==
- Mar del Plata style
- Shotgun house
- Vernacular architecture
- Villa

== Bibliography ==
- Davison, Julian (2006). Black and White: The Singapore House 1898–1941. Talisman Publishing Pte Ltd. ISBN 981052739X. OCLC 62361692.
- King, Anthony D. (1995). The Bungalow: The Production of a Global Culture (2nd ed.). Oxford University Press. ISBN 9780195095234.
- Saylor, Henry H. (1911). Bungalows: Their Design, Construction and Furnishing, with Suggestions Also for Camps, Summer Homes and Cottages of Similar Character. Philadelphia: The John C. Winston Company. OCLC 13231289.
