= Jubilee Park Swimming Pool =

Swimming pool in Woodhall Spa, England

Jubilee Park
- Interactive map of Jubilee Park
- Location: Stixwould Road, Woodhall Spa, LN10 6QH
- Coordinates: 53.155442°N 0.221964°W
- Owner: Jubilee Park Woodhall Spa Ltd
- Dimensions: Length: 33.5 metres (110 ft); Width: 12.5 metres (41 ft)

Website
- www.jubulieeparlwoodhallspa.co.uk

Jubilee Park Swimming Pool, Woodhall Spa, Lincolnshire, England is an open air heated lido.

== History ==
Jubilee Park was created for the benefit of the people of Woodhall Spa by Lady Weigall, who built nearby Petwood, now the famous hotel, as her country house. The park was opened in 1935 by Princess Marie Louise and named to mark the Jubilee of King George V. In its earliest days it was known as ‘The Royal Jubilee Park’.

In 1947 the whole park was gifted to the Urban District Council (UDC) and between 1947 and 1974 the UDC put considerable investment into the park and swimming pool and marketed it countywide. Jubilee Park was as synonymous with Woodhall Spa as the Kinema in the Woods and golf (now the home of the English Golf Union).

Following local government re-organisation in 1974, the UDC eventually agreed to transfer the park to East Lindsey District Council (ELDC), who were keen to add it to their new property portfolio. Jubilee Park now comprises an open-air swimming pool (Lido), communal gardens, caravan site, tennis club and cricket club. The tennis club and cricket club have operated independently for many years under a leased agreement with ELDC. Some investment took place but over the next 30 years it became increasingly apparent that the park and its facilities would have trouble competing for funds with other, newer, leisure venues in the district.

In 2005 when the future of the pool, the café and consequently the park, were in serious doubt, it was not surprising that the community would unite to put pressure on ELDC to invest and save it. The same passions were aroused when it was proposed to close the park's caravan site, with people across the county signing petitions in the belief that not just the caravans, but the park itself was under threat. Woodhall Spa without Jubilee Park would not be Woodhall Spa, and Jubilee Park without the pool would not be Jubilee Park. Woodhall Spa is the acknowledged ‘Jewel in the Crown’ of East Lindsey. Jubilee Park is the ‘Jewel in the Crown’ of Woodhall Spa.

Transfer of ownership of Jubilee Park to Woodhall Spa Parish Council took Place in April 2011. This transfer was accompanied by significant investment in ‘failing’ parts of the infrastructure – not least the swimming pool basin and the infrastructure of the caravan park. This injection of capital has secured the operational ability of the Park along with ensuring that key areas remain compliant with necessary legislative requirements.

With this operational ability secured, there was now need to secure the park's financial future under local ownership. The first four years were broadly successful although involving a steep learning curve. It quickly became apparent, however, that the Parish Council was not set up in a way that could sustain Jubilee Park in the long term and a group of volunteers stepped up to look at possible ways forward.

On 2 May 2014, The Parish Council handed over the operation and management of the swimming pool, caravan site and communal gardens to Jubilee Park Woodhall Spa Ltd (JPWS) on a 99-year lease. JPWS took over from this point with the pool opening for the season the next day. The cricket and tennis clubs in the Park maintained separate leases.

JPWS is a not-for-profit organisation set up as a company limited by guarantee (company number – 8912577). It is also a registered Charity (charity number 1159068).

As set in out in its Articles of Association, the objects of the charity are:

1. To manage, promote and sustain Jubilee Park as a swimming, leisure, sports and recreation facility available for the benefit of the whole community, principally but not exclusively in the local government area of Woodhall Spa.

2. To promote health and fitness in the community in particular but not exclusively through the provision of swimming, sports and health related training and coaching

3. To promote, organise and facilitate co-operation and partnership between third sector statutory and other relevant bodies in the achievement of the above purposes.

== Description ==
The pool measures 33.3 m x 12.5 m.

The Park has a small cafe with open air facilities that is open in the summer season and for special events. It serves both the public park and the swimming pool garden area and is run by a local family under a franchise agreement that has a number of years still to run. The Trustees recognise the importance of this facility and there is scope for development. At this time, however, the provision of good sports/health related facilities is being given a higher priority.

The Park and its gardens are open to all throughout the year including the children's play area. The Park is popular for family picnics and available sports are bowls, tennis, croquet, cricket (for which there are independent clubs) and mini golf. Parking is provided free.

The caravan/camping site has 73 touring pitches and up to 40 tenting pitches. The site is full every weekend and during the school summer holidays. Historically the caravan/camping site has been critical in subsidising the running of the Pool and Park.
