= Ethel Major =

British murderer

Ethel Lillie Major (1892 – 19 December 1934) was a British murderer. She was the only woman to be hanged at Hull Prison. She was known as the Corned Beef Killer.

== Life ==
Ethel Lillie Brown was the daughter of a Lincolnshire gamekeeper on the estate of Sir Henry Hawley. The Hawleys had inherited the estate, known as Tumby or Tumby Lawns, from Sir Joseph Paxton. The Browns lived in a modest lodge house on the estate. Ethel had three brothers. She left school at the then standard age of 14 and found work as a dressmaker. She fell pregnant in 1914 and gave birth to Auriol in 1915 (out of wedlock). The family decided to raise Auriol as Ethel's little sister rather than her child.

In 1918 she met Arthur Major, who had been invalided out of service in the First World War. She married Arthur on 1 June 1918 and after several years living with her parents in 1929 they moved to a Council house in nearby Kirkby-on-Bain, a small village in east Lincolnshire, where Arthur worked as a truck driver for Kirkby gravel pit. Lawrence Major, her son by Arthur, was born in 1920.

However, in 1932, Arthur heard rumours that Auriol was Ethel's daughter, not her sister. Ethel confirmed this and the marriage deteriorated. Ethel went home to sleep at her father's house every night.

== Murder and trial ==
On a spring day in 1934, Arthur sat eating his packed lunch with a colleague. He had corned beef sandwiches, but they tasted wrong. He threw them away saying to his colleague (in jest) that his wife was trying to poison him. A few weeks later, on Tuesday 22 May 1934 Ethel gave Arthur a cup of tea and corned beef sandwich. He felt ill and a doctor was called. The next day he felt slightly better and went to work. He started having convulsions and went home, a second doctor, Dr Smith, was called and thought the problem was epilepsy. Arthur died two days later on 25 May.

The local medical doctor ascribed Arthur Major's death to side effects of epilepsy. However, an anonymous letter to local police, signed "Fair Play" said that Ethel had poisoned Arthur. This (almost certainly from the neighbour) claimed that Ethel had poisoned the neighbour's dog with a corned beef sandwich and the dog had died. It accused Ethel of poisoning Arthur in a similar way.

The police obtained a warrant to delay Arthur's funeral and an autopsy in London by Dr Roche Lynch found strychnine. An autopsy on the dog (which had also been requested and agreed by the neighbour) found the same strychnine.

When the police interviewed Ethel she raised the issue of strychnine poisoning before they had mentioned it, greatly alerting them. Although no strychnine was found in her home there was strychnine at her father's home: in a locked box to which Ethel was proven to have a key.

She was tried at Lincoln Assizes, the trial beginning on 29 October. She was defended by Norman Birkett KC, and had a barrister Richard Chatterton.

The neighbour, Herbert Maltby, gave evidence on how his dog had died on 24 May. A different neighbour, Elsie Roberts, said she had seen Ethel feeding the dog on 23 May, despite usually saying she hated it.

Although the evidence was largely circumstantial, on 2 November the jury took one hour to find Ethel guilty. They recommended mercy but the judge sentenced Ethel to death.

== Execution ==
On 18 December 1934, she wrote a letter each to Auriol and Lawrence. These were not delivered but instead were placed in her Home Office file.

Pleas for clemency went unheard. Ethel was executed at Hull Prison at 9:00 the following day, being hanged by Thomas and Albert Pierrepoint.

Ethel was buried in an unmarked grave in the prison grounds. Arthur lies in St Mary's churchyard in Kirkby-on-Bain.

== Aftermath ==
Lawrence and Auriol lived in Horncastle with their grandfather after Ethel's execution.
