= Richard Adolphus Came =

British architect (1847–1917)

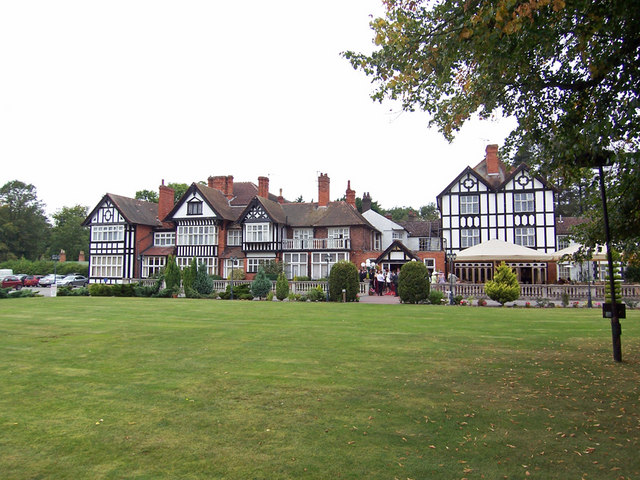
- The Golf Hotel, Woodhall Spa
- Born: 23 April 1847; London
- Died: 19 July 1917 (aged 70); Woodhall Spa
- Education: Lancing College Pupil of Matthew Digby Wyatt. Trained at the Royal Academy Schools.
- Occupation: Architect
- Practice: 39 Great St James Street, London (1871) 27 Mecklanburgh Square London 1878.
- Projects: The laying-out and development of Woodhall Spa. Development of the Queensbury Estates in Newmarket

Richard Adolphus Came (23 April 1847 – 19 July 1917) was an architect who initially worked in London. He gained commissions over a wide area of south-eastern England and according to one source these included "boarding schools, private residences, country houses in Lancing, East Grinstead, Tunbridge Wells, Broadstairs, Ealing, Child's Hill, Hampstead, Winkfield and Windsor." He also designed warehouses in Cannon Street, Cheapside, Bread Street and the German Athenæum Club at 19 Stratford Place in London, as well as electric light stations in Pall Mall, St. James, Richmond and Preston. Came was also a surveyor laying out building developments and acted as a property developer, owning and selling some of the buildings. Two of his major developments were connected with horse racing. At Newmarket he developed two areas of the town and at Ascot he designed most of the residences facing the racecourse.

In 1874–76 he was the architect for the Grantham and Kesteven Hospital. Subsequent to this in 1887 he was commissioned to survey and lay-out Woodhall Spa in Lincolnshire as a new Spa Town. By about 1895 he had moved his architectural practice to Woodhall and was responsible for designing many of the half timbered Arts and Crafts style buildings in the town. He was a pupil of Matthew Digby Wyatt and trained at the Royal Academy School. He qualified as an ARIBA on 6 November 1871.

== Architectural work ==
=== Hospital ===
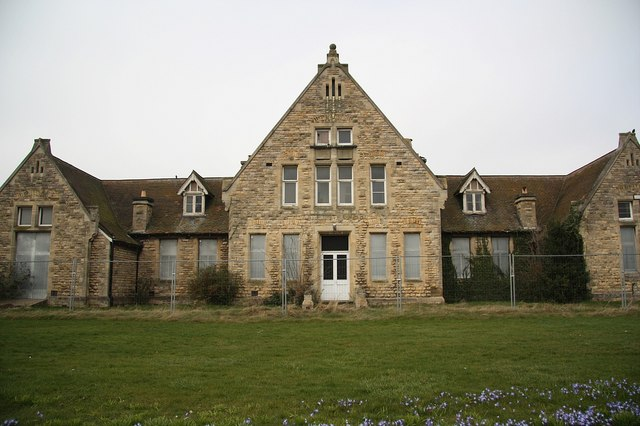
Grantham and District Hospital 1874–76

- Grantham and District Hospital, Manthorpe Road, Grantham 1874–76. Stone, Gothic revival with groups of pavilions.

=== Church ===
- The Roman Catholic Church of Our Lady and St. Peter, Woodhall Spa, Lincolnshire In 1895 Fr Peter Sabela from Grantham opened a Mass centre at Woodhall Spa and in the same year land off Cromwell Avenue was purchased and Thomas Young of Kingerby Hall, near Market Rasen, provided most of the funds to build a church. Came's original drawings remain in the Diocesan archives. They show that the building was intended as a "chapel or school room".

=== Houses ===
- The Golf Hotel, Woodhall Spa.
