= Woodhall Spa =

Former spa town and civil parish in Lincolnshire, England

Coordinates: 53.1515°N 0.2183°W

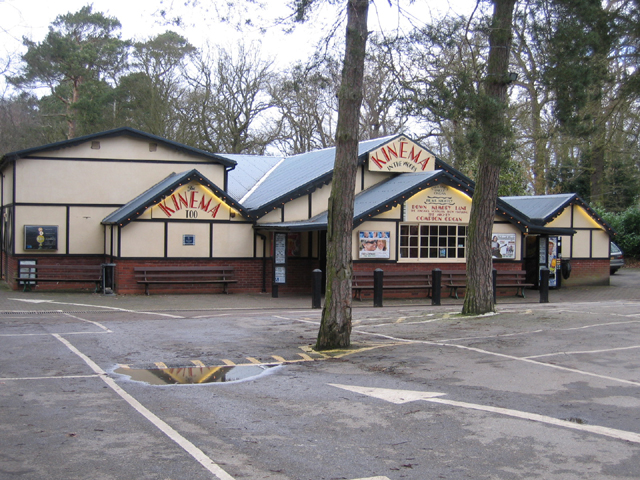
- Louis House

- Location within Lincolnshire
- Area: 13.42 km^{2} (5.18 sq mi)
- Population: 4,680 (Including Kirkstead. 2021)
  - Density: 349/km^{2} (900/sq mi)
- OS grid reference: TF196631
  - London: 115 mi (185 km) S
- District: East Lindsey
- Shire county: Lincolnshire
- Region: East Midlands
- Country: England
- Sovereign state: United Kingdom
- Post town: WOODHALL SPA
- Postcode district: LN10
- Dialling code: 01526
- Police: Lincolnshire
- Fire: Lincolnshire
- Ambulance: East Midlands
- UK Parliament: Louth and Horncastle

Woodhall Spa is a former spa town and civil parish in the East Lindsey district of Lincolnshire. It is on the southern edge of the Lincolnshire Wolds, 6 miles (10 km) south-west of Horncastle, 23 miles (37 km) west of Skegness, 15 miles (24 km) east-south-east of Lincoln and 17 miles (27 km) north-west of Boston. It is noted for its mineral springs, historic cinema and its Second World War association with the RAF 617 Squadron, commonly referred to as the Dambusters.

Much of the village's Victorian elegance remains, with large parts of the centre being designated as a conservation area since January 1991.

== History ==
=== Ancient history ===
A Mesolithic flint blade and a Neolithic stone axe have been found in Woodhall. From the Bronze Age are a dagger and a barrow.

=== Roman Period ===
Evidence exists of Roman activity in the area, with a field system south of the village and east of Ostler's Plantation.

A Sestertius of Marcus Aurelius was found along Horncastle Road.

=== Medieval Period ===
==== Kirkstead Abbey ====
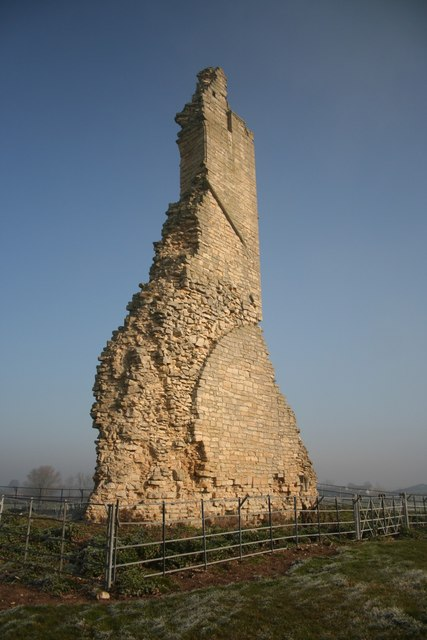
Remains of the south transept of Kirkstead Abbey

Kirkstead Abbey was founded as a Cistercian monastery in 1139 by Hugh Brito, Lord of Tattershall and was originally colonised by an abbot and twelve monks from Fountains Abbey in Yorkshire.

The abbey remained in existence until 1537, when it was dissolved; the last abbot, Richard Harrison, and three of his monks were executed by Henry VIII following their implication (probably unjustly) in the Lincolnshire Rising of the previous year.

The land passed to the Duke of Suffolk and later to the Clinton Earls of Lincoln, who built a large country house. By 1791 that too had gone and all that remains today is a dramatic crag of masonry - a fragment of the south transept wall of the abbey church - and the earthworks of the vast complex of buildings that once surrounded it, which is Grade I listed, and an ancient scheduled monument.

==== Tower-on-the-Moor ====
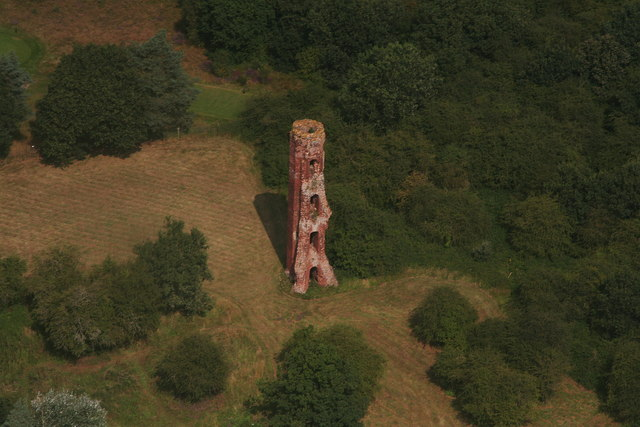
The Tower-on-the-Moor

The Tower-on-the-Moor, an octagonal, four-storey, red brick-built tower, is the stair turret of what is believed to have been a hunting lodge, built in the mid–15th century for Ralph de Cromwell, 3rd Baron Cromwell whose fortified house, Tattershall Castle, was located 4 miles (6 km) to the south at Tattershall. It is a Grade II* Listed Building and a scheduled Ancient Monument. Documentary sources indicate that the tower was partly dismantled in 1472, when bricks from the Tower on the Moor were used for repairs at Tattershall Castle. One of the older roads in Woodhall Spa, Tor-O-Moor Road is named after the tower.

The Tower is adjacent to the 3rd green of the Hotchkin Course at Woodhall Spa Golf Club. It is a notable feature of the course and has been adopted as the emblem of the golf club.

=== 18th century ===
==== Woodhall Spa Manor and the Hotchkin Family ====
The building and grounds of Woodhall Spa Manor are intrinsically linked to the development of the village from its formative years. The earliest references to this site show that a small hunting lodge was present here in the late 18th century. The inner library room still retains original Jacobean carving over the fireplace and is believed to be the earliest remaining feature from the hunting lodge days.

Woodhall Lodge or Wood Corner, as it was then known, became the property of one Thomas Hotchkin of Rutland, Lord of the Manor of Thimbleby and Woodhall. Hotchkin had inherited many manors throughout Rutland and Lincolnshire but Woodhall Lodge was his particular favourite and where he spent most of his time. Half a mile to the west of the grounds, close to the present Kinema, Thomas Hotchkin had built a spa bath in the late 1830s, having by chance discovered the healing properties of the iodine-rich water in a disused mine shaft on his land. In 1842 White's Directory describes Woodhall Spa as "a modern watering place … with just over 300 souls" and Thomas Hotchkin as living in Woodhall Lodge, "a neat mansion near the spa'.

After his passing, four further generations of the Hotchkin Family lived in Woodhall Lodge. At some point during the last century, it was renamed as the Old Manor or Manor House. During the residence of Thomas Hotchkin's great-grandson, Stafford Vere Hotchkin (1876–1953), who helped to redesign the adjacent world-rated golf course which bears his name, there were major additions to the building. Around 1905 the south-west corner and east wings were built, greatly enlarging the footprint of the property, leaving the front entrance wholly Georgian, whilst, to the left and right are the Edwardian additions. The magnificent sweeping staircase, the beautiful hallway and Queens Room fireplaces, and the mahogany panelled entrance to the library all date from this period of high elegance. In 1965, Thomas Hotchkin's great great-grandson, Neil Stafford Hotchkin (1914–2004), sold the property to the National Farmers Union and it was converted into offices as the company's regional headquarters. Around twenty five years later, it was sold to a local businessman, who continued to run it as offices for various Lincolnshire companies. In 2013 new owners renamed it Woodhall Spa Manor and it now serves as a wedding and event venue.

=== 19th century ===
Woodhall Spa came about by accident in 1811 after John Parkinson of Old Bolingbroke made several attempts to find coal. After spending several thousand pounds and sinking a shaft over 1,000 feet deep, the enterprise was abandoned on account of the now rising spring. The spring flows daily through soft spongy rock at a depth of 520 feet.

About 1834, the then Lord of the Manor, Thomas Hotchkin, ascertained by analysis that the water was in fact valuable, being an iodine and bromine containing mineral spring. He spent nearly £30,000 sinking a well and erecting the Spa Baths, as well as building the Victoria Hotel. A description from 1919 of the therapeutic benefits patrons might expect to enjoy after 'taking the waters' ran as follows:

The water is used both internally and externally and has been of the greatest efficacy in arthritis, rheumatoid arthritis, osteo-arthritis, articular and muscular rheumatism, gout (especially of joints), neuritis, sciatica and nervous complaints, glandular swellings, catarrh, high arterial tensions, skin diseases, sterility, fibroid tumours and inflammatory diseases of women, as well as in a variety of other complaints, and it can be obtained in a bottled form direct from the Spa or through any chemist.

The Victoria Hotel burned down on Easter Day, 4 April 1920, when an electrical fault in the boiler room spread to the linen room above.

==== Railways ====
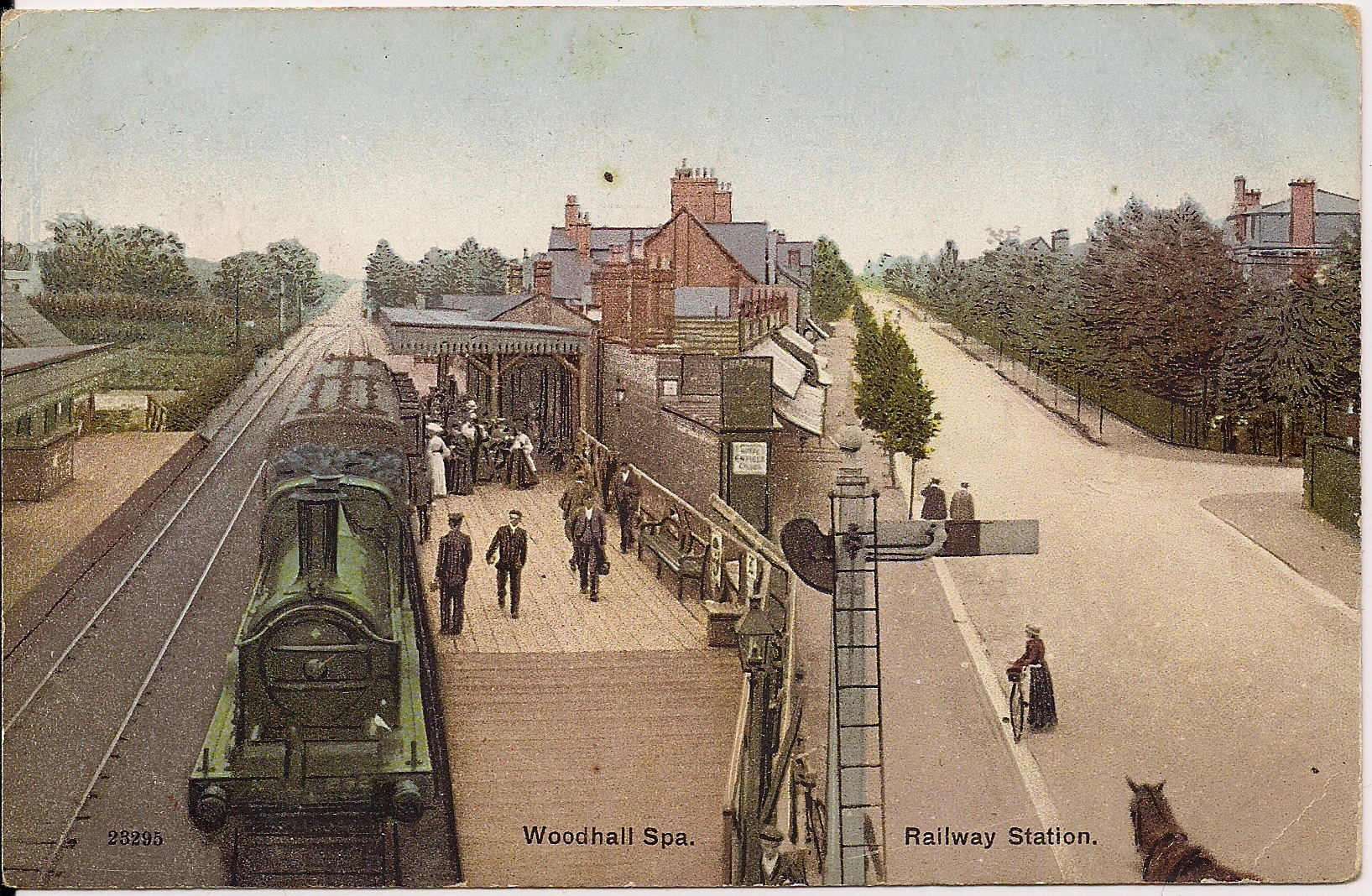
Woodhall Spa Station around 1910

In 1846 the Great Northern Railway company purchased the land to build a rail link from Peterborough to Lincoln via Boston and Woodhall Junction. Work commenced in 1847 and the line opened on 17 October 1848. Kirkstead Station, later renamed Woodhall Junction, was one of seven between Lincoln and Boston. A branch line to Horncastle, which included Woodhall Spa railway station, was opened on 11 August 1855.

The railways brought increasing popularity, and an elegant spa town with hotels and guest houses on wide tree-lined avenues, largely designed by Richard Adolphus Came, grew up around the original facilities. He stated in his designs that none of the roads shall be "streets", which is still true today, and the roads built since have also been lined with various trees. In 1886 the estate was purchased by a syndicate, and extensive alterations and improvements were made. The Victoria Hotel and the Spa Baths were greatly modified by the syndicate, a group of investors including Lord Alverstone, Lord Iddesleigh and Edward Stanhope MP in 1887.

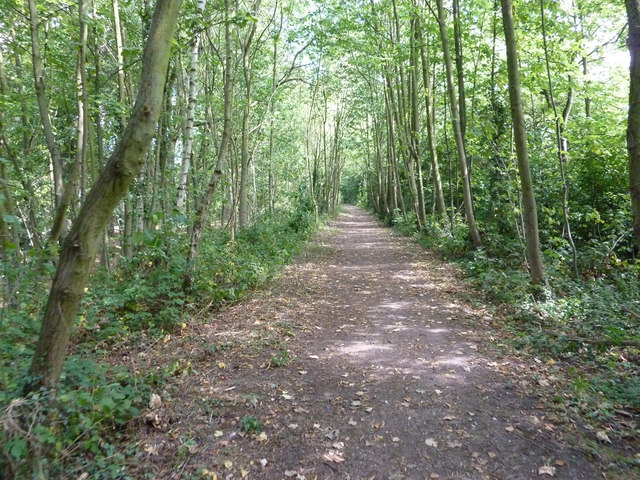
The Spa Trail

Woodhall and Woodhall Spa stations closed along with the rest of the Boston to Lincoln line in 1971 and demolition of Woodhall Spa station came soon afterwards. The trackbed between Woodhall and Horncastle is now a bridleway known as the Spa Trail and forms part of the Viking Way. Woodhall Junction remains in private ownership.

=== 20th century ===
==== Second World War ====
Dam Busters Memorial

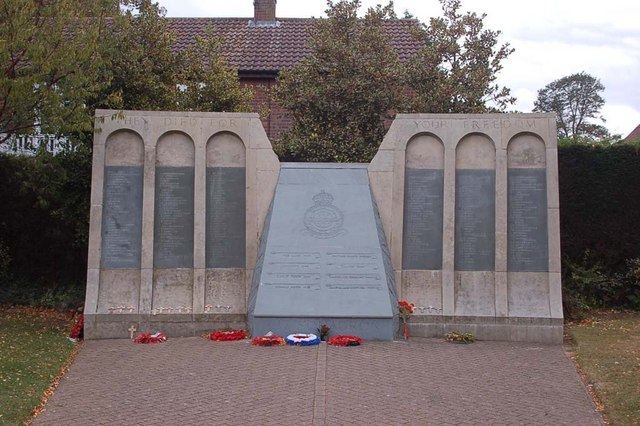
Memorial to the members of 617 Squadron who took part in the Dam Busters raid

In the Second World War Woodhall Spa's two main hotels, The Golf Hotel and The Petwood Hotel, were requisitioned for the RAF and Pinewoods was used to hide military equipment, especially on its northern perimeter. RAF Woodhall Spa airfield was built to the south of the village in the parish of Tattershall Thorpe. It closed for operational purposes in 1964, although it is still owned by the Ministry of Defence, used mainly for jet engine maintenance and testing and is operated as a satellite unit of nearby RAF Coningsby.

A memorial wall depicting the breaching of the German dams in Operation Chastise, otherwise known as the "Dam Busters" raid, stands in the Royal Gardens (the site of the Royal Hydro Hotel) in the centre of the village. It is dedicated to the memory of those from 617 Squadron who were killed during the war. The memorial is the location of a local school choir photograph, published in Lincolnshire Life magazine, which included a black Labrador dog; the photo-caption asks if this "mysterious" animal was Guy Gibson's dog, which was run over and killed shortly before Gibson departed to bomb German dams.

Most of the Royal Hydro Hotel and Winter Gardens was destroyed by a German parachute mine which fell on 17 August 1943, although part of it did survive and became the Mall Hotel. Two civilians were killed.

==== Post-war ====
The Spa Baths finally closed when the well collapsed in 1983. After spending many years in a derelict state, the site is now being redeveloped.

== Geography ==
Woodhall Spa lies at the southwestern edge of the Central Lincolnshire Vale, between the Rivers Witham and Bain. The village is largely flat rising gently towards the east, and is surrounded towards the north and east by a mixture of ancient and planted woodland. To the south west can be found many sand and gravel excavation pits, some still in use and some abandoned, many of which are now protected nature reserves such as the former RAF Woodhall Spa now managed by the Lincolnshire Wildlife Trust. Much of the land on which the village is built was once extensive heathland with a light fluvial sandy soil. Well-preserved areas of heathland can be seen at Moor Farm Nature Reserve on Wellsyke Lane, where plants include tormentil, bell heather and climbing corydalis.

The abundance of sand and gravel in the soil around Woodhall Spa explains the formation of acidic heathland, in a county otherwise characterised by calcareous bedrock and naturally alkaline soils. Lincolnshire's heathland has historically been eroded by agriculture, forestry, quarrying and peat-cutting and is threatened by falling water-tables. To the northwest, south and immediately west can be found arable farmland, with the River Witham lying one mile to the west of the village centre and arable fenland beyond that.

The civil parish of Woodhall Spa borders the civil parishes of Tattershall Thorpe, Timberland, Martin, Stixwould and Woodhall, Roughton, and Kirkby on Bain.

The village is served by the B1191 running west from Martin through Woodhall to Horncastle to the north-east, and by the B1192 from Coningsby and Tattershall to the south.

The nearest active railway stations are now in Boston, Lincoln, Skegness, Metheringham, Ruskington and Sleaford.

Population of Woodhall Spa Civil Parish
Year	1901	1911	1921	1931	1951	1961	2001	2011
Population	988	1,484	1,635	1,372	1,671	1,978	3,657	4,003

== Governance ==
An electoral ward of the same name exists. This ward includes Kirkby on Bain with a total population taken at the 2011 Census of 4,298. The village is within the Louth and Horncastle Parliamentary constituency.

The more ancient parish of Kirkstead was amalgamated with Woodhall Spa in the early 1980s, thus formalising what was already a reality.

== Recreation and facilities ==
=== The Kinema in the Woods ===
The Kinema in the Woods is located at the centre of the Pinewoods, next to the now derelict Spa Baths and opposite the site of the former Victoria Hotel. Housed in a converted cricket pavilion, it opened in 1922 as one of the first cinemas in Britain. It is the last cinema in the country to employ back projection and also offers regular entertainment on an original Compton Kinestra 3 Manual / 9 Rank organ. The organ was installed in 1987; its console (which is the only surviving Japanese Lacquered console in the UK) was originally installed in the Super Cinema, Charing Cross Road, London between 1927 and 1943.

=== Jubilee Park ===
Jubilee Park, opened in 1937, lies adjacent to the Pinewoods and includes Jubilee Park Swimming Pool, a heated outdoor swimming pool. The park also offers tennis courts, a bowling green, children's playground, croquet and a cricket ground, which is home to Woodhall Spa Cricket Club. On 22 December 2010, BBC Radio 4 broadcast the half-hour-long Australian Wanted in Woodhall Spa, presented by Chris Ledgard and detailing overseas players playing for English amateur cricket clubs.

In December 2010, East Lindsey Council sold Jubilee Park to the Woodhall Spa residents for £1. It is currently undergoing renovations. Jubilee Park is next to a caravan park of the same name.

=== Woodlands ===
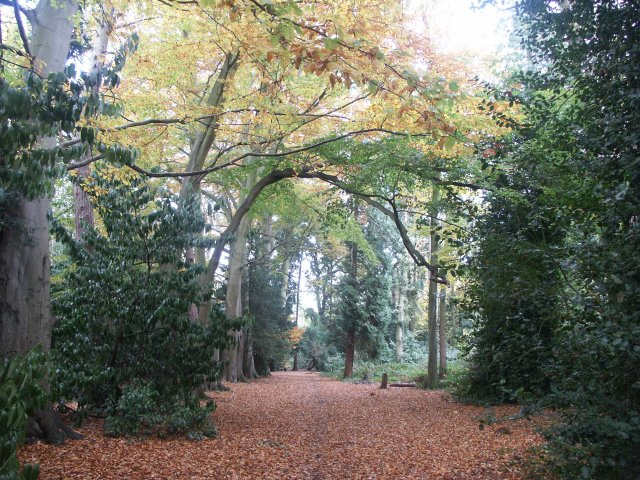
The Pinewoods

The Pinewoods is a 19 acres (7.7 ha) woodland at the centre of the village, owned by the Woodland Trust. It is made up of mature oak, Scots pine, beech and birch. Originally scrub land, later becoming part of the grounds of the Victoria Hotel, it attracts visitors, particularly in the spring and autumn.

Ostler's Plantation is a Forestry Commission working woodland along the south side of Kirkby Lane to the east of Woodhall Spa. It is open to the public for a range of recreational activities throughout the year. It is primarily pine with oak, birch and some other species around the fringes. It is bordered to the east by Kirkby Moor Nature Reserve and to the south by the former RAF Woodhall Spa, which has recently been purchased by the Lincolnshire Wildlife Trust soon to become a nature reserve.

To the east of the village between Horncastle Road and Kirkby Lane lie Kirkby and Roughton Moors. Once open heathland, these are now almost all wooded, with parts owned by the Lincolnshire Wildlife Trust and managed as two nature reserves: Kirkby Moor Nature Reserve and Roughton Moor Wood Nature Reserve. Both are open to the public and can be accessed from either Kirkby Lane, Wellsyke Lane or Horncastle Road.

There are more areas of woodland towards Horncastle to the north of the Viking Way/Spa Trail: Highhall Wood is private but with a permissive access footpath through it; White Hall Wood is open to the public and Thornton Wood is private.

=== The National Golf Centre ===
The first nine-hole golf course was opened in Woodhall Spa in 1890, but only survived until 1895 when the land was required for building. A new site was found and another nine-hole golf course was laid out, but by 1902 it became clear that the golf course would have to find another new home as the land was again required for the expansion of the spa town.

Local landowner Stafford Vere Hotchkin, offered a sandy tract of land off the Horncastle Road to build an 18-hole course. The course was designed by Harry Vardon and was formally opened for play on 24 April 1905. It was remodelled in 1911 by Harry Colt, and again by Hotchkin himself in the 1920s.

Womersley House was built by the Hotchkin family, which was instrumental in the development of the adjoining Hotchkin Golf Course—now the headquarters of the English Golf Union, who bought the course in 1995 to set up a National Golf Centre. A second course, "The Bracken", opened for play in 1998 alongside the original course, now named "the Hotchkin". The St Andrews Trophy was held at the golf course in 1996. It was voted 20th best course in the world by Today's Golfer magazine in 2010.

=== Footpaths and Walking ===
The Viking Way is a 147 miles (237 km) long-distance footpath which passes through Woodhall Spa en route between the Humber Bridge and Oakham in Rutland.

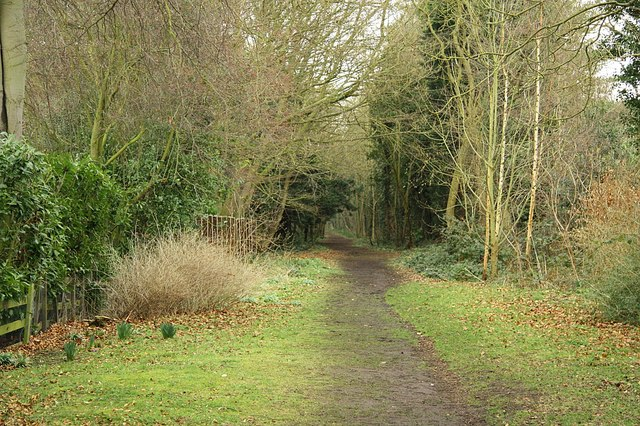
Spa Trail

The Spa Trail runs for 3.4 miles (5.5 km) along the former Horncastle Branch Line between Sandy Lane on the outskirts of the village and Thornton Lodge at Fifty Acre near Horncastle. It is concurrent with the Viking Way and forms a continuous traffic-free footpath between Woodhall Spa and Horncastle. Along the route can be found sculptures an information board on the history of the railway and local area.

The Water Rail Way is a 25 miles (40 km) long part of the National Cycle Network that runs from Boston to Lincoln, following as closely as possible the banks of the River Witham. Between Woodhall Spa and Lincoln it consists of a tarmacked path that runs along the route of the former railway line from Boston to Lincoln. It was built and financed by Sustrans, and was finally completed and opened in November 2008. It is open to all forms of non-motorised transport, forming part of NCN Route 1. Named primarily after its route and former use, the path is also named after a native but seldom-seen wading bird called the water rail.

=== Hotels and accommodation ===
The Legacy Woodhall Spa Hotel opened in 1882 as the Eagle Lodge Hotel. It was converted into a nursing home in the 1960s and reopened as a hotel in 1991. The Golf Hotel was originally called Clevedon House and has been a school, a club and a hotel of the same name.

The Royal Hydro Hotel and the attached Winter Gardens were mostly destroyed in a German air raid during World War II in August 1943, although part survived and became the Mall Hotel.

The Petwood Hotel is so called because it was originally built at the turn of the 20th century as a house for Grace, Lady Weigall, who had it constructed in her favourite wood, her "pet wood". Lady Weigall turned her former home into a hotel in 1933. The gardens, designed by Harold Peto, are listed at Grade II on the Register of Historic Parks and Gardens of Special Historic Interest in England.

=== The Cottage Museum ===
The heyday of Woodhall Spa was recorded by a local photographer, John Wield, and many of his photographs are displayed in the Woodhall Spa Cottage Museum, which was his home.

=== Churches ===
Saint Peter's church was built in 1893, although it was not until 1915 that it was legally designated the parish church. The building was designed by architect C H Fowler in brick with a half-timbered bell turret, and with glass by Powell's. Until then the little church of Saint Andrew, built in 1846, was the parish church, but was too small for the rapidly growing town. Woodhall Spa is now part of a group of six Anglican parishes comprising: Woodhall Spa and Kirkstead, Stixwould, Horsington, Langton with Old Woodhall, and Bucknall with Tupholme.

The Church of Our Lady and Saint Peter, built in 1893, is Woodhall Spa's Roman Catholic church.

== Education ==
There are two schools within Woodhall Spa, both Church of England: St Hugh's School, a preparatory boarding school on Cromwell Avenue, and St Andrew's C of E Primary School on King Edward Crescent.

Secondary schools are outside Woodhall and include Queen Elizabeth's Grammar School and Banovallum School in Horncastle, and Barnes Wallis Academy in Tattershall.

== Media ==
Local news and television programmes are provided by BBC Yorkshire and Lincolnshire and ITV Yorkshire. Television signals are received from the Belmont TV transmitter, BBC East Midlands and ITV Central can also be received from the Waltham TV transmitter.

The local radio stations are served by BBC Radio Lincolnshire on 94.9 FM, Greatest Hits Radio Lincolnshire on 102.2 FM and DAB radio station, Hits Radio Lincolnshire.

The town's local newspaper is the Lincolnshire Echo.

== Twin town ==
Woodhall Spa is twinned with Roézé-sur-Sarthe in Pays de la Loire, France, which is around 6 miles (9.7 km) south west of Le Mans. The charter was signed in 1989.

== Notable residents ==
- Violet Dickson (1896–1991); attended the village's Miss Lunn's High School in the early 1900s
- Flying Officer Ray Grayston (1918–2010); one of the last survivors of the Dambusters' raid and was flight engineer of the Lancaster that breached the Eder Dam.
- Leonard Cheshire (1917–1992); lived here during his time as Officer Commanding No. 617 Squadron (November 1943–July 1944) and was created a life peer as Baron Cheshire, of Woodhall in the County of Lincolnshire in 1991
- John Hartley (1874–1963); Test cricketer who died in Woodhall Spa
- Steve Plater (b.1972); motorcyclist
- David Tarttelin (b.1929); painter who, as a child was evacuated to Woodhall Spa during the Second World War.
- Adrian Tchaikovsky; Author.
- Robert Webb (b.1972); actor, comedian and writer who grew up in Woodhall Spa.
- Sir Archibald Weigall Baronet Weigall of Woodhall Spa (1874–1952); Governor of South Australia.
- David Wigley (b.1981); cricketer.
- Willie Hamilton (1917–2000); former Labour MP and noted republican.
- Colonel Stafford Hotchkin (1876–1953); MP for Horncastle, High Sheriff of Rutland and designer of the eponymous Hotchkin Course (Woodhall Spa Golf Course).
- Neil Hotchkin (1914–2004); first-class cricketer for Middlesex.

== Gallery ==
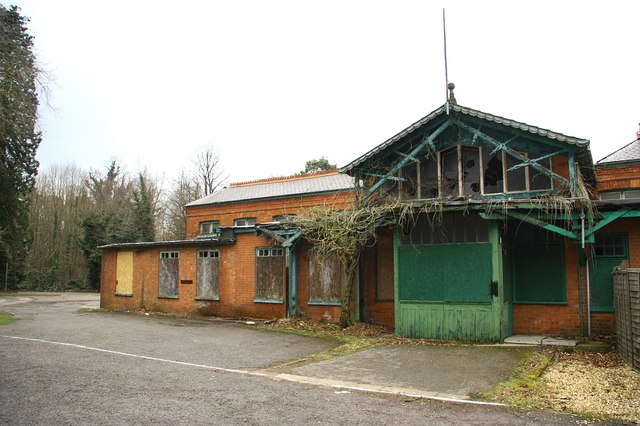
The derelict Spa Baths in 2009

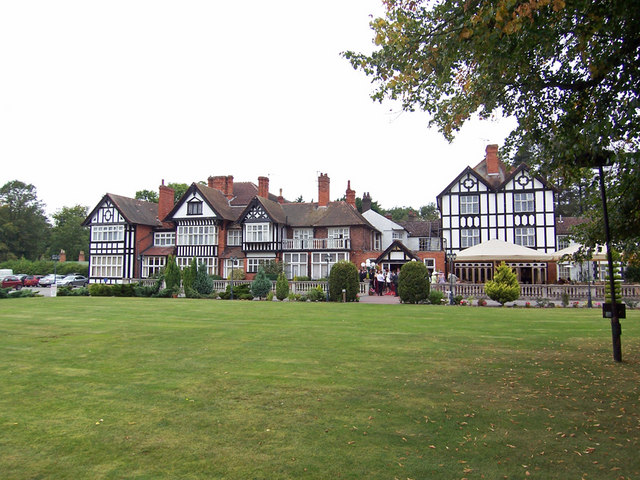
The Golf Hotel

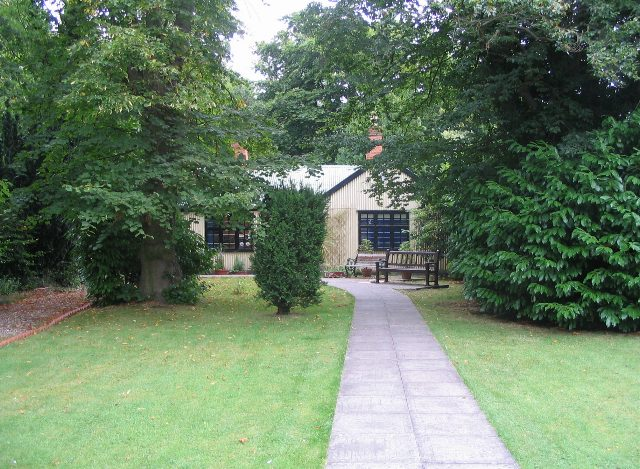
The Cottage Museum, Woodhall Spa

== See also ==
- List of spa towns in the United Kingdom
- Kirkby Moor
- Kirkstead
  - Kirkstead Abbey
  - St Leonard's Without
