= Woodhall Spa Cottage Museum =

Small community museum in Woodhall Spa, Lincolnshire, England

Coordinates: 53°09′13″N 0°12′41″W

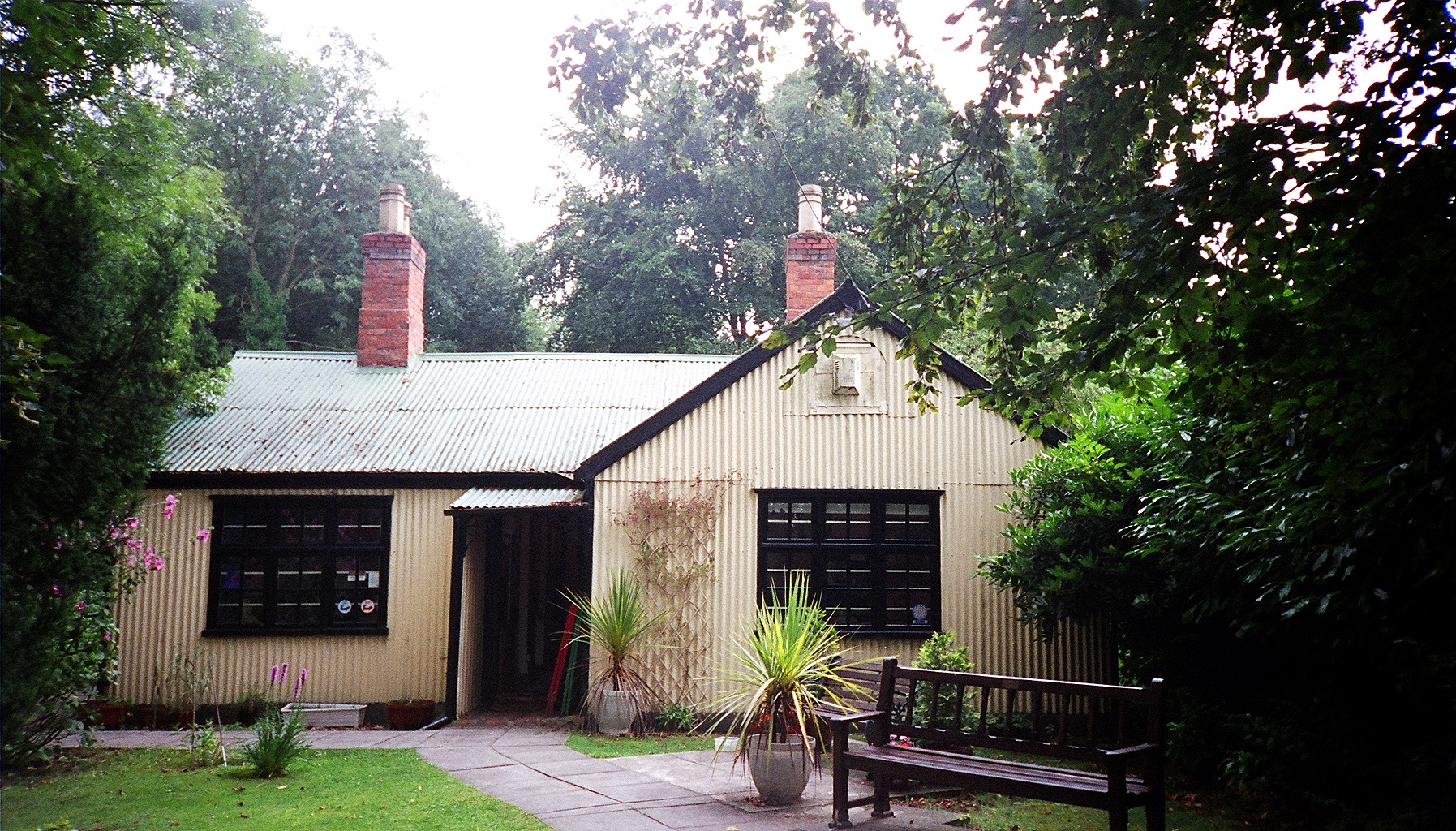
The Cottage Museum, Woodhall Spa

The Woodhall Spa Cottage Museum also known as Woodhall Spa. (Cottage Museum, Woodall Spa,) is a community museum managed by volunteers, and located on Iddesleigh Road, Woodhall Spa, Lincolnshire, England. The museum documents the history of Woodhall Spa's development as a 19th-century spa town designed by Richard Adolphus Came.

== History ==
The museum was inaugurated in 1987 and consists of a bungalow constructed of corrugated galvanised iron laid on a timber frame. The building was shipped to Woodhall Spa as a flat pack.

The cottage, erected in 1887, was chosen from the models available in the catalogue of Boulton & Paul Ltd, a leading manufacturer of corrugated iron buildings, which were in vogue in the era. An unusual example of such a cottage is that it is still standing in well-preserved condition.

The cottage was built by John and Mary Wield, employees of Woodhull Spa. The Wields were in the business of providing rides in Bath chairs drawn by donkeys to carry visitors between the spa's health baths and hotels. John Wield created a photographic record of the then new Victorian spa community at Woodhall Spa. Today, his photographic collection forms the basis of the Woodhall Spa Cottage Museum collection. The bungalow was the home of the Wield family from 1887 to the 1960s.

John Wield's collection of photographs and ephemera were offered in the early 1980s to the community of Woodhall Spa to put on public display. Not long after that, in 1985, John Wield's bungalow came on the market and, in 1986, a trust was formed to set up the Woodhall Spa Cottage Museum.

The local tourist information centre is housed within the museum.

In 2011, the Heritage Lottery Fund awarded a grant of £677,600 to be used to refurbish the building, update the exhibits, and fund programs. The project reflected the need to remove several small, wooden outbuildings (an old donkey stable, workshop and photography studio) that had been damaged by arson.
