= The Kinema in the Woods =

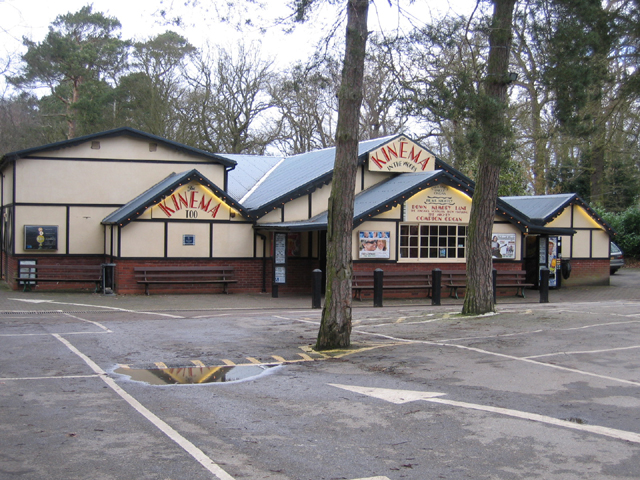
The Kinema in the Woods in March 2004

The Kinema in the Woods is an historic cinema in the village of Woodhall Spa, Lincolnshire, England. It dates from 1922, and it is the only fully functioning cinema in the UK to employ back projection.

Major C.C. Allport ran the Kinema in the Woods from 1922 to 1973, when it was bought by Mr James Green who ran it until his retirement in 2013. A second screen, named Kinema Too, was added in 1994 and the main foyer was extended. A third screen was added in 2019. In October 2021 a 4th screen opened. An outside screen is now in service during the weekends in summer months.

A Compton Kinestra organ was installed in The Kinema in June 1987. The organ, in Screen One, was originally installed in the Super Cinema, Charing Cross Road, London in 1927, and includes an "ornate red-lacquered 2 manual console".
