= Kirkby on Bain =

Village and civil parish in the East Lindsey district of Lincolnshire, England

Coordinates: 53.146215°N 0.1435°W

Kirkby on Bain: Kirkby
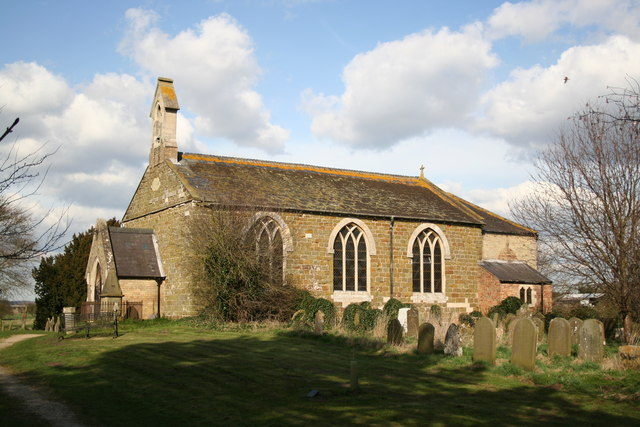
- St Mary's Church, Kirkby-on-Bain

- Location within Lincolnshire
- Area: 7.31 km^{2} (2.82 sq mi)
- Population: 295 (2011)
  - Density: 40/km^{2} (100/sq mi)
- OS grid reference: TF241626
  - London: 115 mi (185 km) S
- Civil parish: Kirkby on Bain
- District: East Lindsey
- Shire county: Lincolnshire
- Region: East Midlands
- Country: England
- Sovereign state: United Kingdom
- Post town: WOODHALL SPA
- Postcode district: LN10
- Dialling code: 01526
- Police: Lincolnshire
- Fire: Lincolnshire
- Ambulance: East Midlands
- UK Parliament: Louth and Horncastle

Kirkby on Bain is a village and civil parish in the East Lindsey district of Lincolnshire, England. It lies on the River Bain between Horncastle and Coningsby, and just west of the A153 road. Close to the north is the village of Haltham. In 2011 the parish had a population of 295.

== History ==
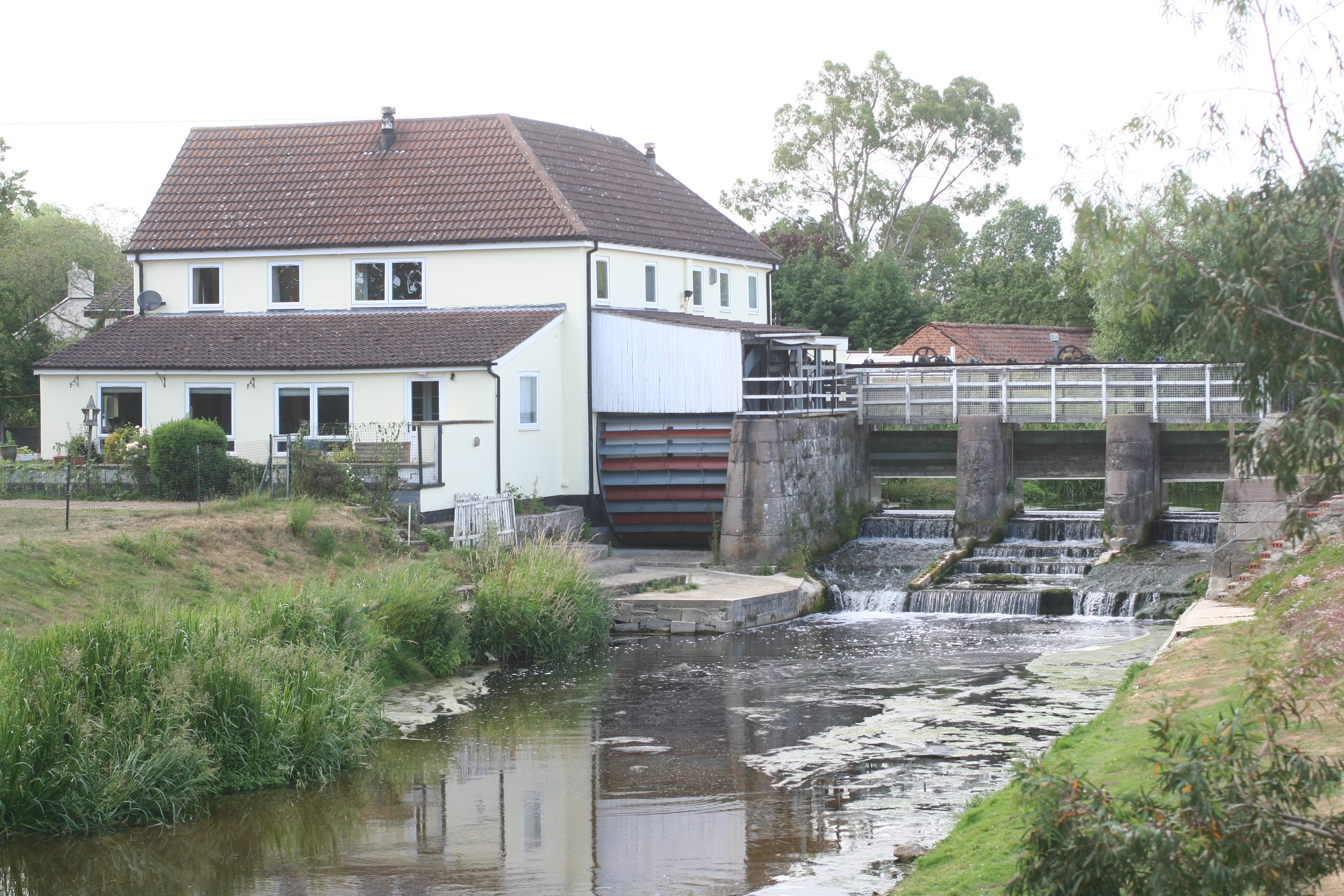
The old watermill on the River Bain in the centre of the village.

Formerly known as Kirkby Super Bain, the name comes from the Old Norse kîrkĵu + býr (Church settlement), with the village dating back to at least the Viking Age.

=== Ebrington Arms ===
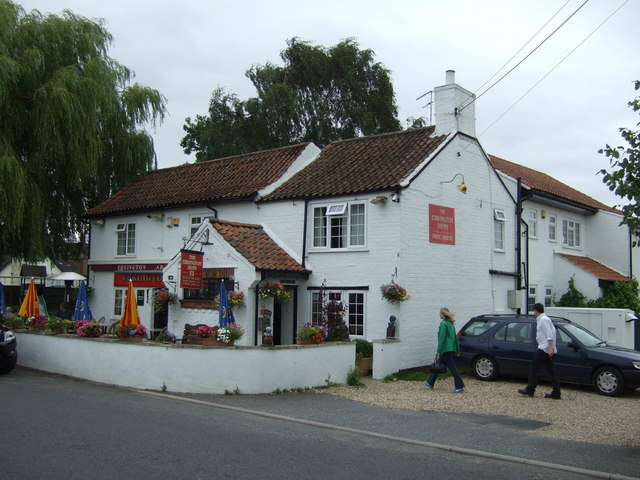
The Ebrington Arms village pub

The village public house is the Ebrington Arms on Main Street which dates back to at least the 16th Century. It was popular with airmen from the nearby RAF Woodhall Spa famed for its links with the 617 Squadron Dambusters.

=== St. Mary's Church ===
The parish church is dedicated to St Mary, and is in the Bain Valley Group of churches. It dates back to Norman times, and the parish records to 1562. The church was largely rebuilt in 1802 and expanded in 1879–82.

== Notable residents ==
- Ethel Major the Corned Beef Killer and her victim, her husband, Arthur Major.
- Abigail Tarttelin, award-winning author was born in Lincolnshire and attended the village school.

== Geography ==
Kirkby on Bain lies within the glacial Bain Valley at the confluence of River Bain and Haltham Beck. The Bain was canalised into the Horncastle Canal in the 1790s with the Old Course now little more than a stream in many places and dry in others.

=== North ===
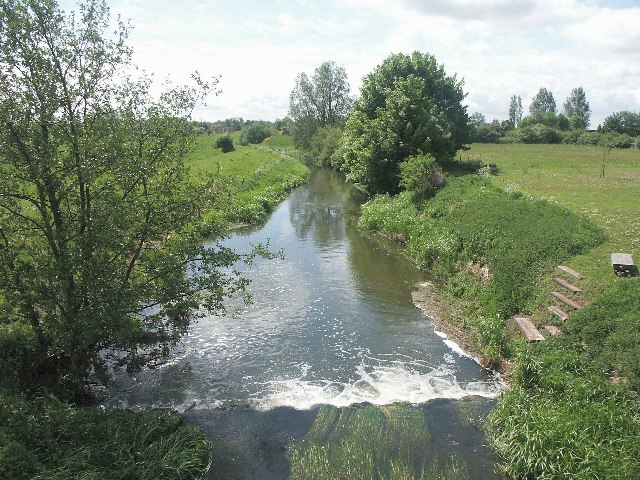
River Bain (Horncastle Canal) looking south towards Kirkby on Bain from atop Red Mill Bridge

To the north stretches the shallow glacial valley of the River Bain. Along the valley floor and flood plain the land is largely pastoral farmland used for rearing cattle and sheep, whilst further away from the river the land is more arable.

=== South ===
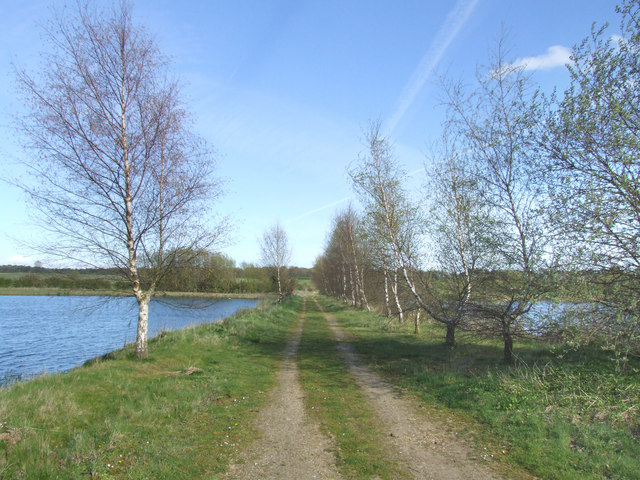
Bridleway through Kirkby Gravel Pits Nature Reserve

To the south along the valley are sand and gravel pits, many of them now long disused and some transformed into Kirkby Gravel Pits Nature Reserve, which is managed by Lincolnshire Wildlife Trust. The nature reserve is very biodiverse, and is one of very few inland sites in the county which have been visited by Eurasian spoonbill.

=== West ===
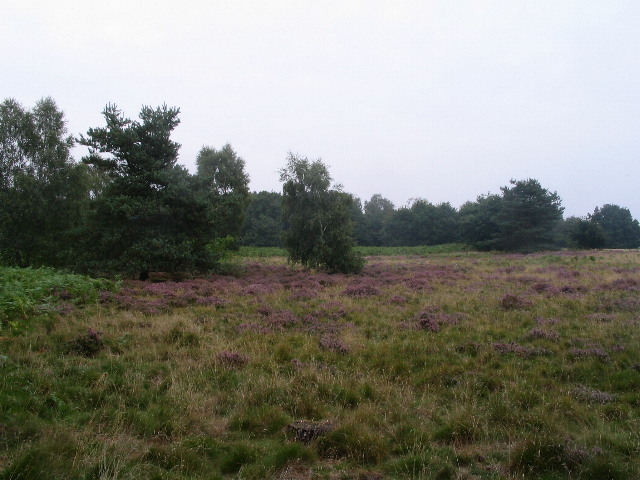
Typical Lowland Heathland landscape of Kirkby Moor Nature Reserve

To the west are Kirkby and Roughton Moors; a landscape once dominated by Lowland Heath now restricted to Fox Hill, and beyond is Ostler's Plantation, a pine woodland owned by the Forestry Commission. In this landscape can be found Kirkby Moor and Moor Farm Nature Reserves, both SSSIs, and soon to be joined by the former airfield of RAF Woodhall Spa purchased by the Lincolnshire Wildlife Trust in September 2014.
