= Ostler's Plantation =

Plantation in Lincolnshire, England

Ostler's Plnatation
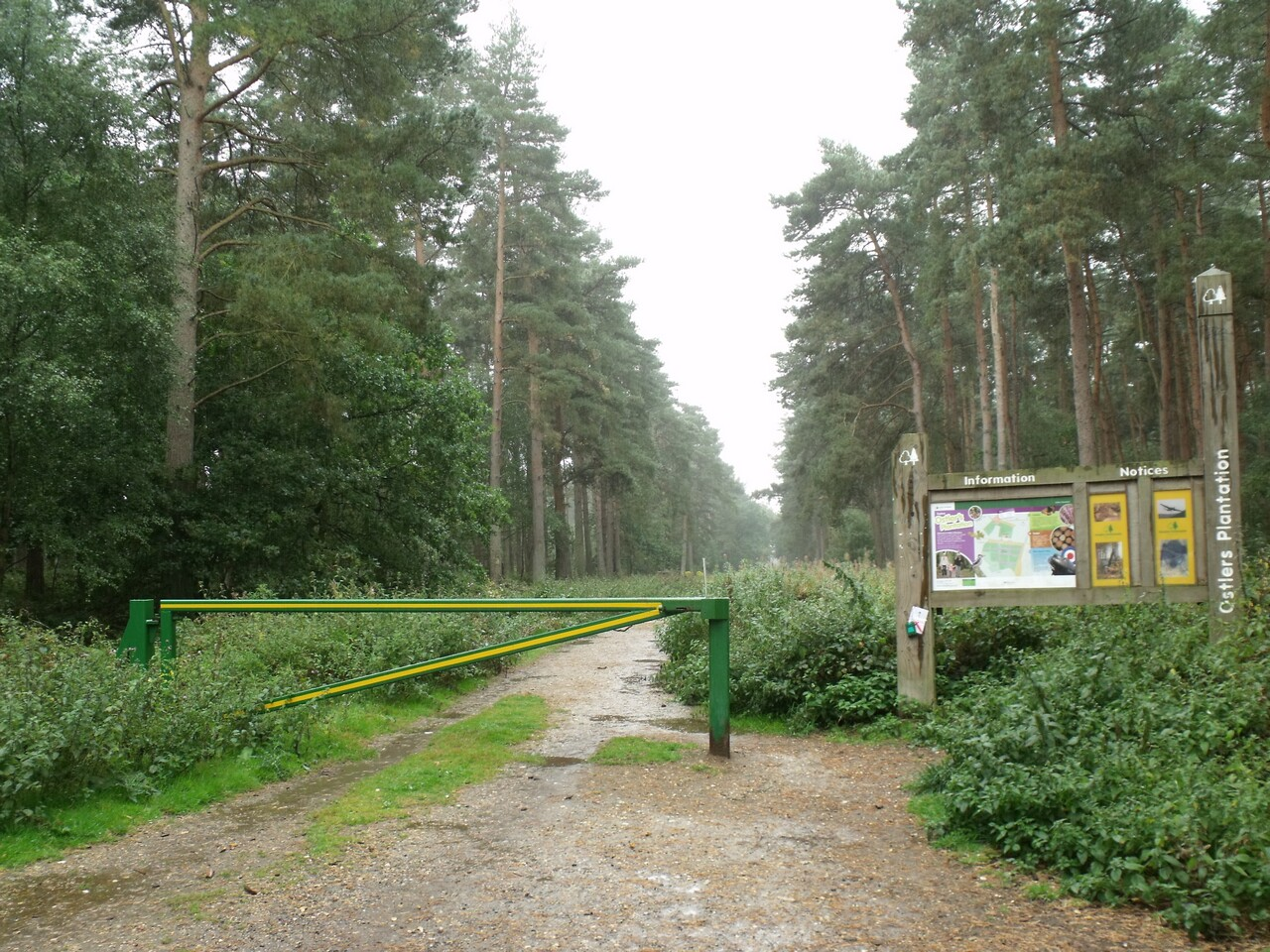
- Entrance to Ostler's Plantation from the car park.

- Location within England
- Interactive map of Ostler's Plnatation

Geography
- Location: Lincolnshire, United Kingdom
- Coordinates: 53.146°N 0.181°W
- Elevation: 15–20 m (49–66 ft)
- Area: 102.62 ha (253.6 acres)

Administration
- Established: 19th Century
- Authority: Forestry England

Ostler's Plantation is a woodland east of Woodhall Spa, Lincolnshire on Kirkby Moor. It has public access and lies to the west of an open area of Lowland Heath, the Kirkby Moor Nature Reserve; both are noted for having large numbers of adders.

The whole site is open to the public throughout the year, although some areas may be restricted during harvesting. It is a popular area for walking, horse riding and cycling with organised mountain biking and archery events held.

There is no direct access to the adjoining nature reserves from the woodland - these have to be accessed by going back onto Kirkby Lane.

== History ==
=== 19th Century ===
The plantation was originally planted in the early 19th century by John Parkinson on an area of open moorland. After his bankruptcy in 1827 his former agent, William Ostler, became its owner.

=== 20th Century ===
The majority of the woodland was acquired by the Forestry Commission in 1938 with the south west corner added in 1971. Today managed by Forestry England and still used as a commercial plantation with periodic harvesting.

=== Second World War ===
In 1942 RAF Woodhall Spa was built immediately to the south of the woodland with many of the bomb dumps, aprons and other associated buildings being built into the edge of the woodland. Much of these still remain as tracks and overgrown ruins.

== Piri Piri Burr ==
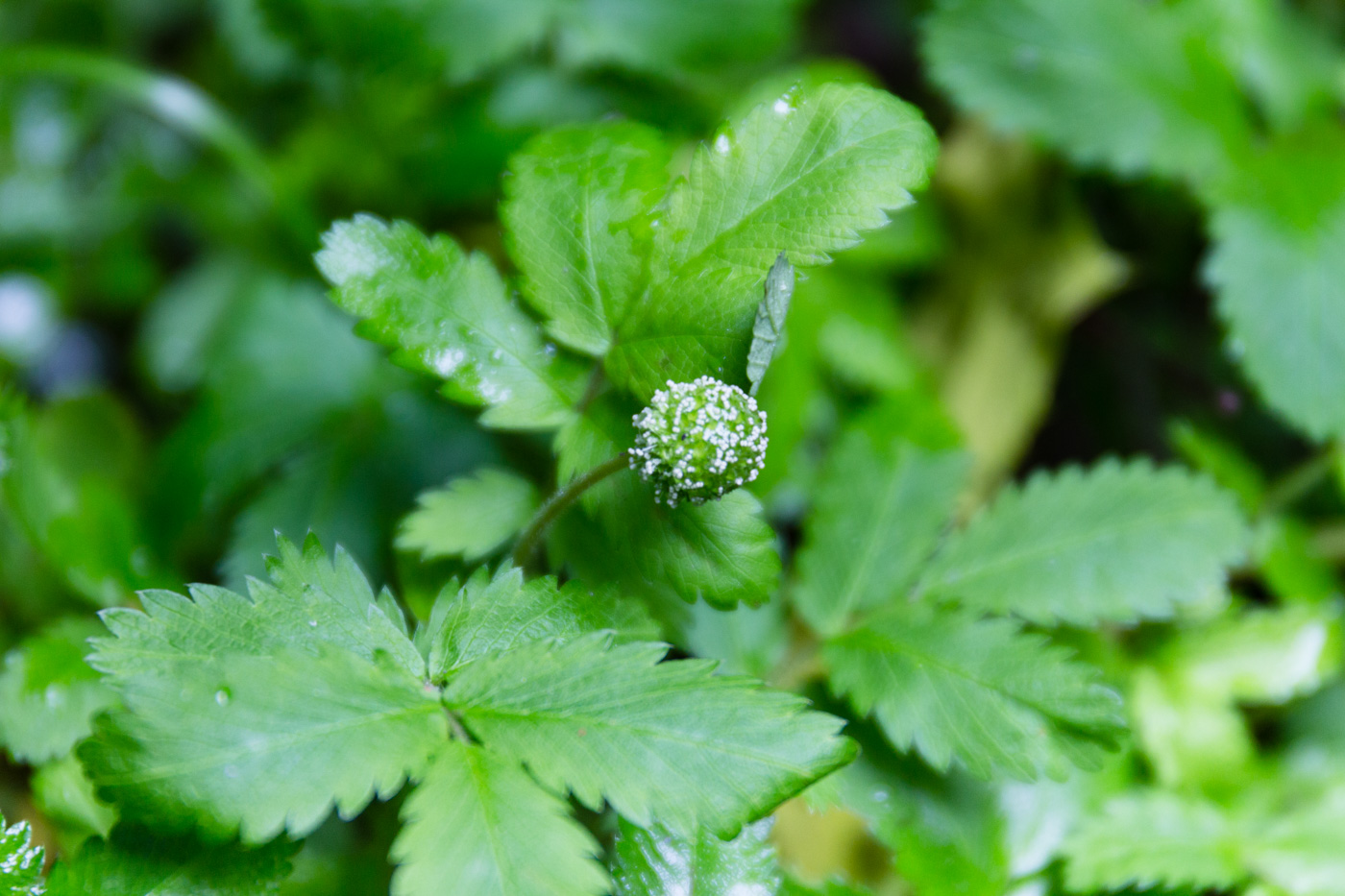
Piri Piri Burr

The woodland has become home to the invasive Piri Piri Burr (Acaena novae-zelandiae) brought over by airmen from New Zealand during the Second World War. Efforts are underway to control and remove the plant.

== Snake bites ==
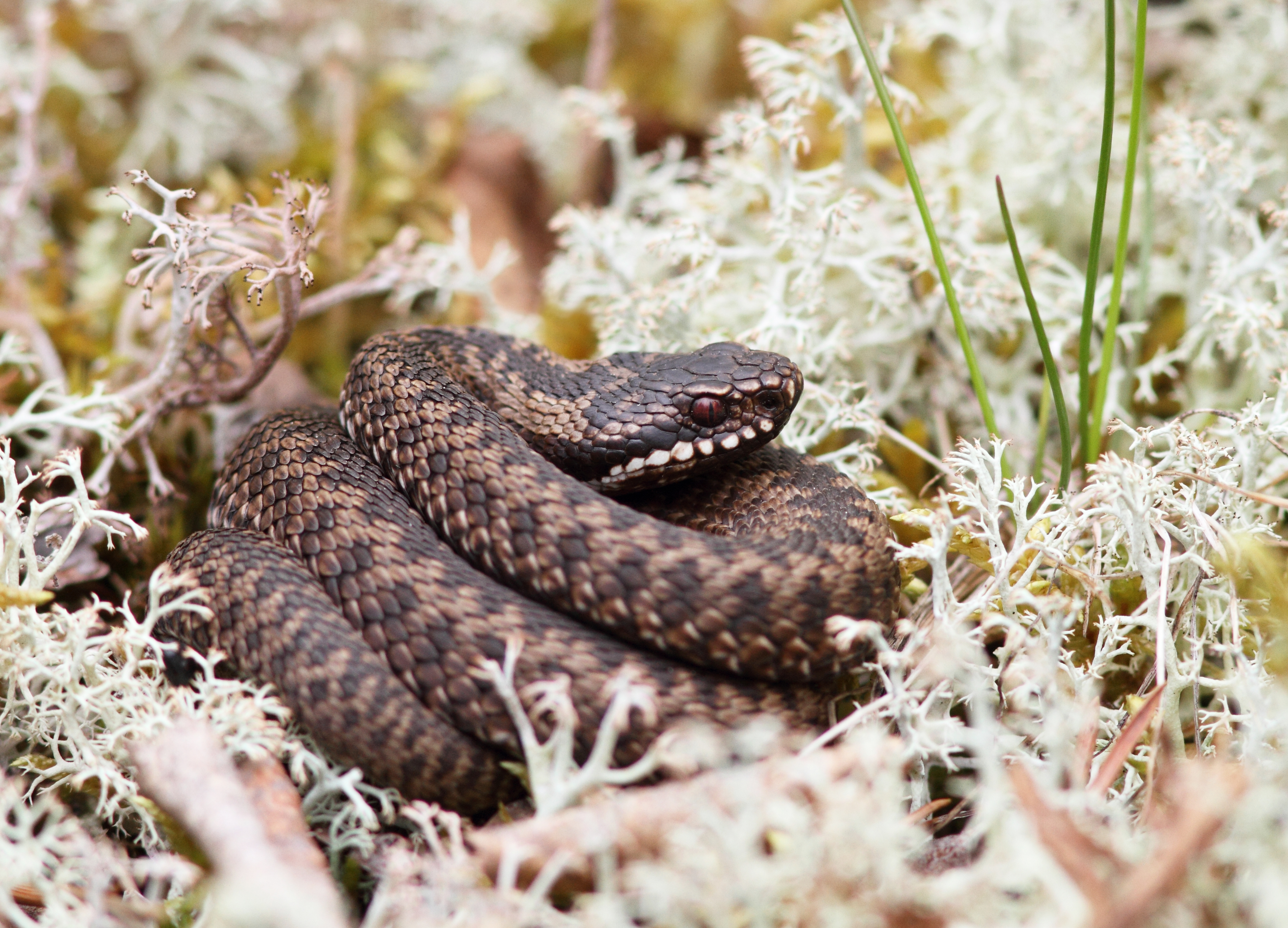
Adder (European Viper)

On 18 April 2009 a 7-year-old boy was bitten by an adder after handling it while walking in the woods. After receiving hospital treatment at Lincoln County Hospital he made a full recovery; however it reignited concern over the danger of snakes. Although adders are a protected species, many local people believe that there should be adequate warning signs and that they should be under control. A lack of anti-venom has also been highlighted. Over the past years a number of dogs have also been bitten.

== Fauna and Flora ==
Species resident or visitors to the woodland include:

=== Reptiles ===
- Adder (Vipera berus)
- Grass Snake (Natrix helvetica)
- Slow Worm (Anguis fragilis)
- Common Lizard (Zootoca vivipara)

=== Bats ===
- Natterers Bat
- Noctule Bat
- Common Pipestrelle
- Soprano Pipestrelle Bat
- Brown Long Eared Bat
- Wiskered Bat
- Daubentons Bat
- Barbastelle Bat
