= Scrafield =

Deserted medieval village in Lincolnshire, England

Coordinates: 53.201°N 0.0488°W

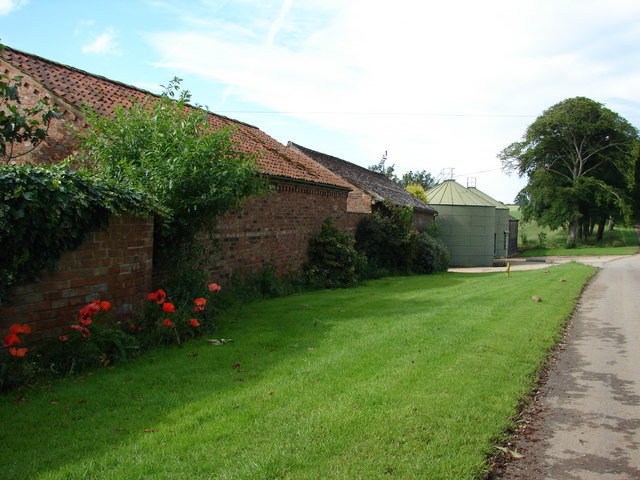
- Scrafield

- Location within Lincolnshire
- OS grid reference: TF304689
  - London: 120 mi (190 km) S
- Civil parish: Mareham on the Hill
- District: East Lindsey
- Shire county: Lincolnshire
- Region: East Midlands
- Country: England
- Sovereign state: United Kingdom
- Post town: Horncastle
- Postcode district: LN9
- Police: Lincolnshire
- Fire: Lincolnshire
- Ambulance: East Midlands
- UK Parliament: Louth and Horncastle

Scrafield is a hamlet and a deserted medieval village (DMV) in the civil parish of Mareham on the Hill, in the East Lindsey district, in the county of Lincolnshire, England. It is approximately 4 miles (6.4 km) south-east of the town of Horncastle. In 1931 the parish had a population of 24. On 1 April 1936 the parish was abolished to form Mareham on the Hill.

The village was not listed in the Domesday Book of 1086, but first mentioned in documentary sources in 1183.

Scrafield church was dedicated to Saint Michael but fell into disrepair, and by 1842 it had gone, although the churchyard was still used. The northern part of the churchyard was levelled in 1977, and only a single 18th-century gravestone is visible today.

Present-day maps show a small number of buildings at Scrafield House.
