= Martin, East Lindsey =

Coordinates: 53.184°N 0.143°W

Martin
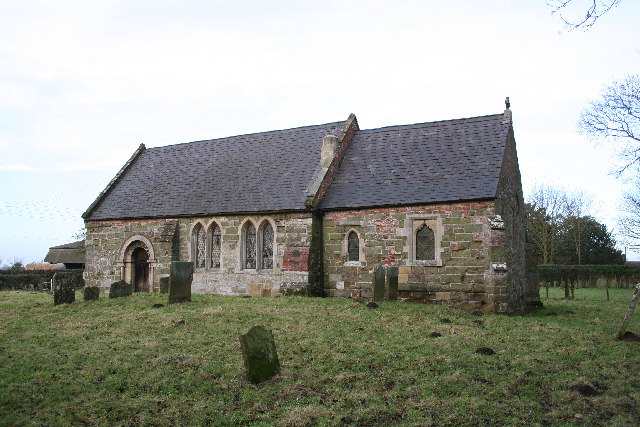
- St Michael's Church, Martin

- Location within Lincolnshire
- OS grid reference: TF242668
  - London: 115 mi (185 km) S
- Civil parish: Roughton
- District: East Lindsey
- Shire county: Lincolnshire
- Region: East Midlands
- Country: England
- Sovereign state: United Kingdom
- Post town: Horncastle
- Postcode district: LN9
- Police: Lincolnshire
- Fire: Lincolnshire
- Ambulance: East Midlands
- UK Parliament: Louth and Horncastle

Martin is a village and former civil parish, now in the parish of Roughton, in the East Lindsey district of Lincolnshire, England. It is about 2 miles (3 km) south from the town of Horncastle. In 1931 the parish had a population of 41. On 1 April 1936 the parish was abolished and merged with Roughton. The church is dedicated to Saint Michael.
