= River Waring =

River in Lincolnshire, England

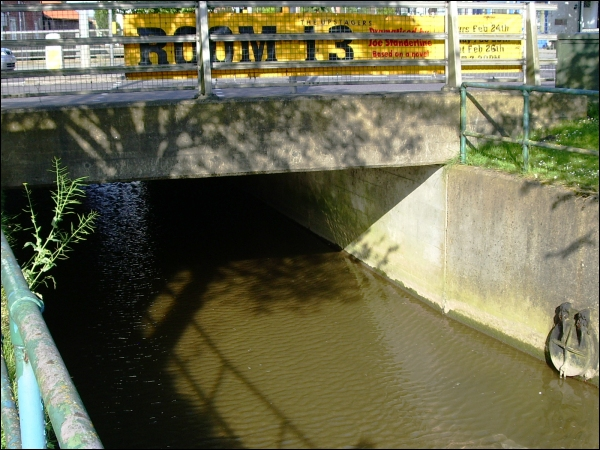
- The River Waring as it flows through Horncastle, viewed from Wharf Road

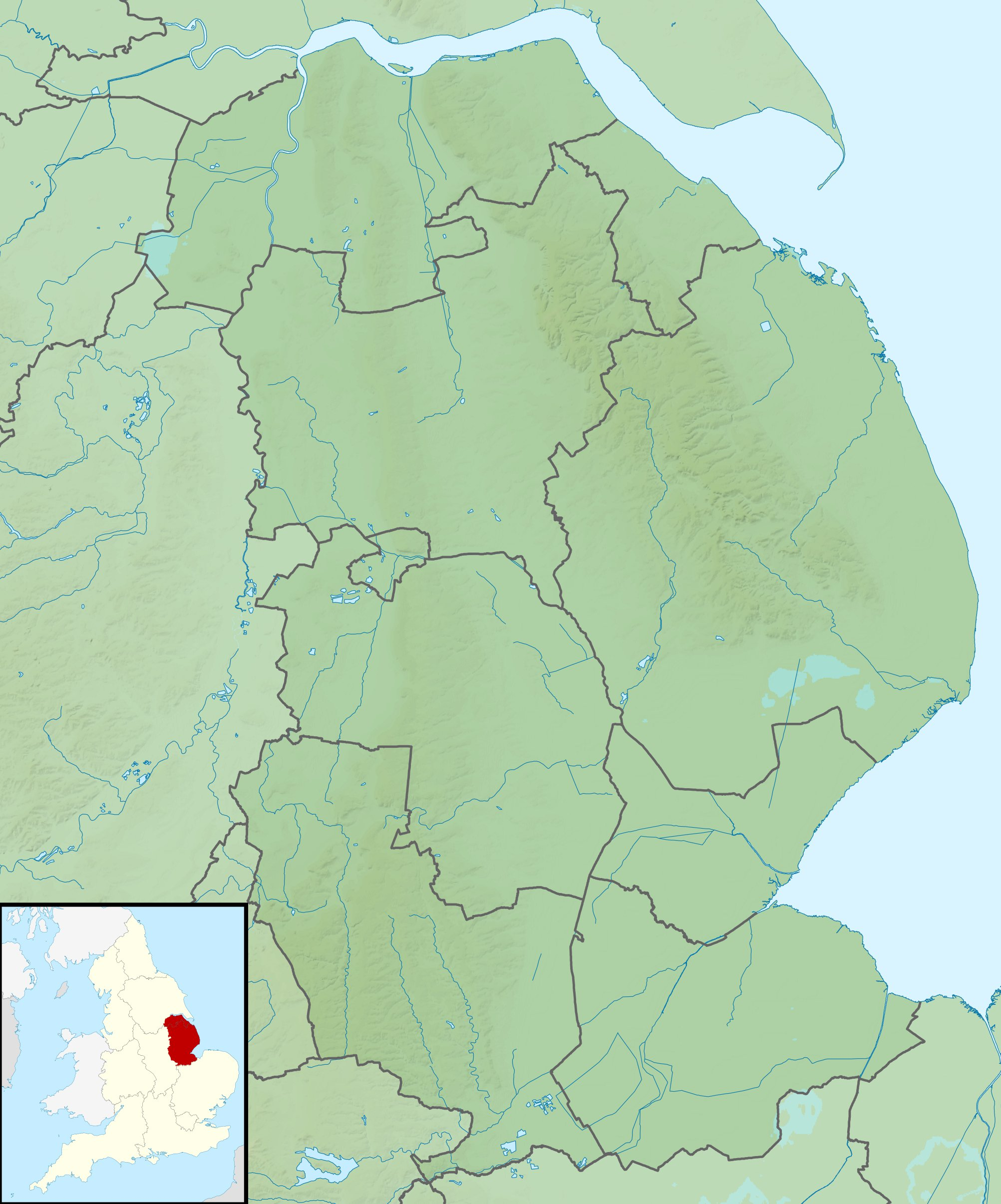
- Location of the mouth within Lincolnshire

Location
- Country: England
- County: Lincolnshire

Physical characteristics
- Source
  - location: Belchford
  - elevation: 328 ft (100 m)
- Mouth
  - location: Horncastle
  - coordinates: 53.2068°N 0.1224°W
  - elevation: 95 ft (29 m)

Basin features
- Tributaries
  - left: Thunker Drain

The River Waring is a small river in Lincolnshire, England, and a tributary of the River Bain. The Waring rises in the parish of Belchford and runs through Belchford village, passing between the villages of Fulletby, West Ashby and Low Toynton before arriving at Horncastle, where it divides Horncastle market place from the part of the town known as Cagthorpe. After the Horncastle floods of the 1960s, the river channel was straightened and its banks built up through the town. It joins the River Bain along with the Thunker Drain or Scrafield Beck at the confluence by the town's swimming pool, which was built on the site of the old dry dock of the Horncastle Canal.

== Bibliography ==
- Clarke, J. N. (1990). The Horncastle and Tattershall Canal. Oakwood Press. ISBN 0-85361-398-2.
