= Tetford =

Village and civil parish in the East Lindsey district of Lincolnshire, England

Coordinates: 53.25°N 0.01°W

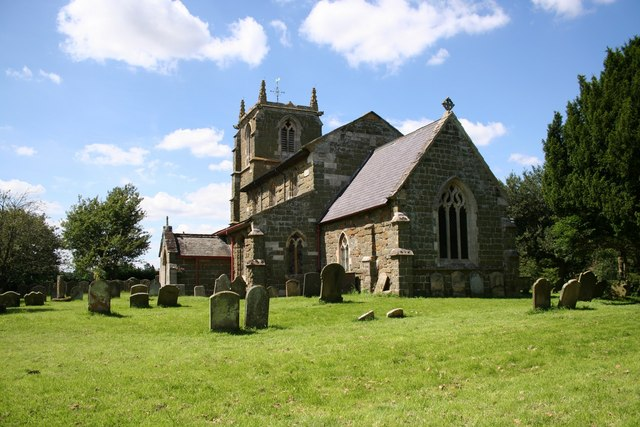
- St Mary's Church, Tetford

- Location within Lincolnshire
- Population: 464 (including Salmonby, 2011)
- OS grid reference: TF3374
  - London: 120 mi (190 km) S
- Civil parish: Tetford
- District: East Lindsey
- Shire county: Lincolnshire
- Region: East Midlands
- Country: England
- Sovereign state: United Kingdom
- Post town: HORNCASTLE
- Postcode district: LN9
- Dialling code: 01507
- Police: Lincolnshire
- Fire: Lincolnshire
- Ambulance: East Midlands
- UK Parliament: Louth and Horncastle

Tetford is a village and civil parish in the East Lindsey district of Lincolnshire, England.

== History ==
Tetford is listed as "Tesforde" in the Domesday Book, with a mill, probably on the site of the present 17th-century watermill near the centre of the village.

The parish contains traces of ancient encampments thought to be from Saxon times. It is reputed to be the site where Raengeires, a Briton, defeated the Saxon general Horsa in a great battle.

In 1841 the parish was noted for its fertiliser production made from burnt limestone.

The Edward Richardson Community Primary School was founded through a 1714 bequest from Edward Richardson of a cottage and about 7 acres (28,000 m^{2}) of land towards teaching the poor children of Tetford and Salmonby. In 1821 a National School was built and enlarged in 1897 and 1899.

For many years Tetford was the home of Methodist preacher Charles Richardson, known as the 'Lincolnshire Thrasher'. Richardson was an uneducated farm labourer who late in life discovered a gift for evangelistic preaching and was invited to preach throughout England. He was inspired by a 'time of refreshing' at Tetford starting at Christmas 1826 when a chapel congregation enjoyed a service 'like a little Pentecost' which continued until 3 am. After this they went to Mr Riggall's house and 'such a baptism of the Holy Spirit was bestowed upon him as he had never received before.' A biography of Richardson, 'The Peasant Preacher', went through at least four editions.

The White Hart Inn, parts of which date from the 16th century, was once the meeting place of the Tetford Club for local gentry, whose members included Tennyson from nearby Somersby.

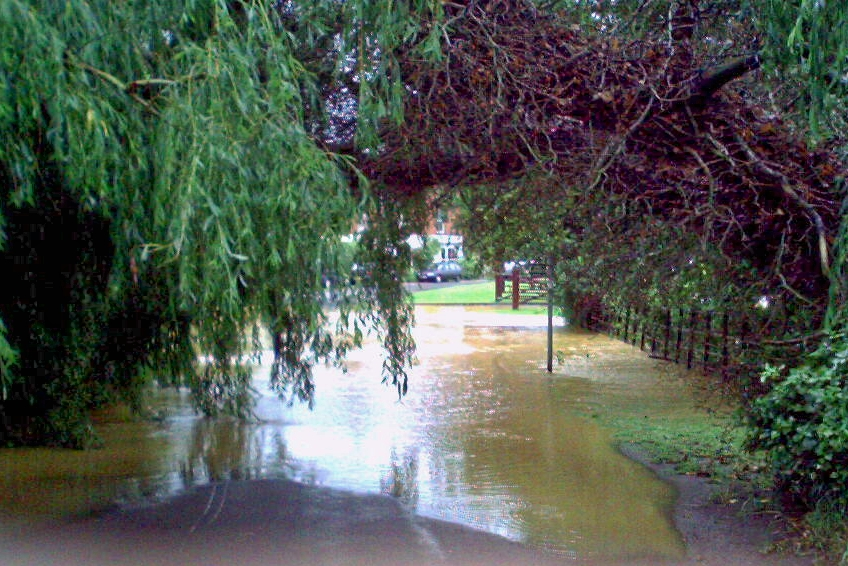
2007 flooding

During the 2007 United Kingdom floods the village was affected with East Road and West Road being flooded, causing the north of the village to be cut off from the south.

== Governance ==
An electoral ward in the same name exists. This ward stretches south west to Mareham on the Hill with a total population at the 2011 Census of 2,196.

== Geography ==
Tetford is in the Lincolnshire Wolds, a designated Area of Outstanding Natural Beauty, running from Louth in the north, to Horncastle in the south. The village is 6.5 miles (10.5 km) north-east from Horncastle, 10 miles (16 km) south from Louth and 8 miles (13 km) north-west from Spilsby. It is in a shallow valley, at the bottom of a 98 m (322 ft) high ridge on which runs the Bluestone Heath Road. The parish covers about 1,730 acres (7.0 km^{2}).

The Prime Meridian passes just to the east of Tetford.

== Community ==
Village amenities include the Edward Richardson Community Primary School, the White Hart Inn public house, and a doctor's surgery.

=== Church ===
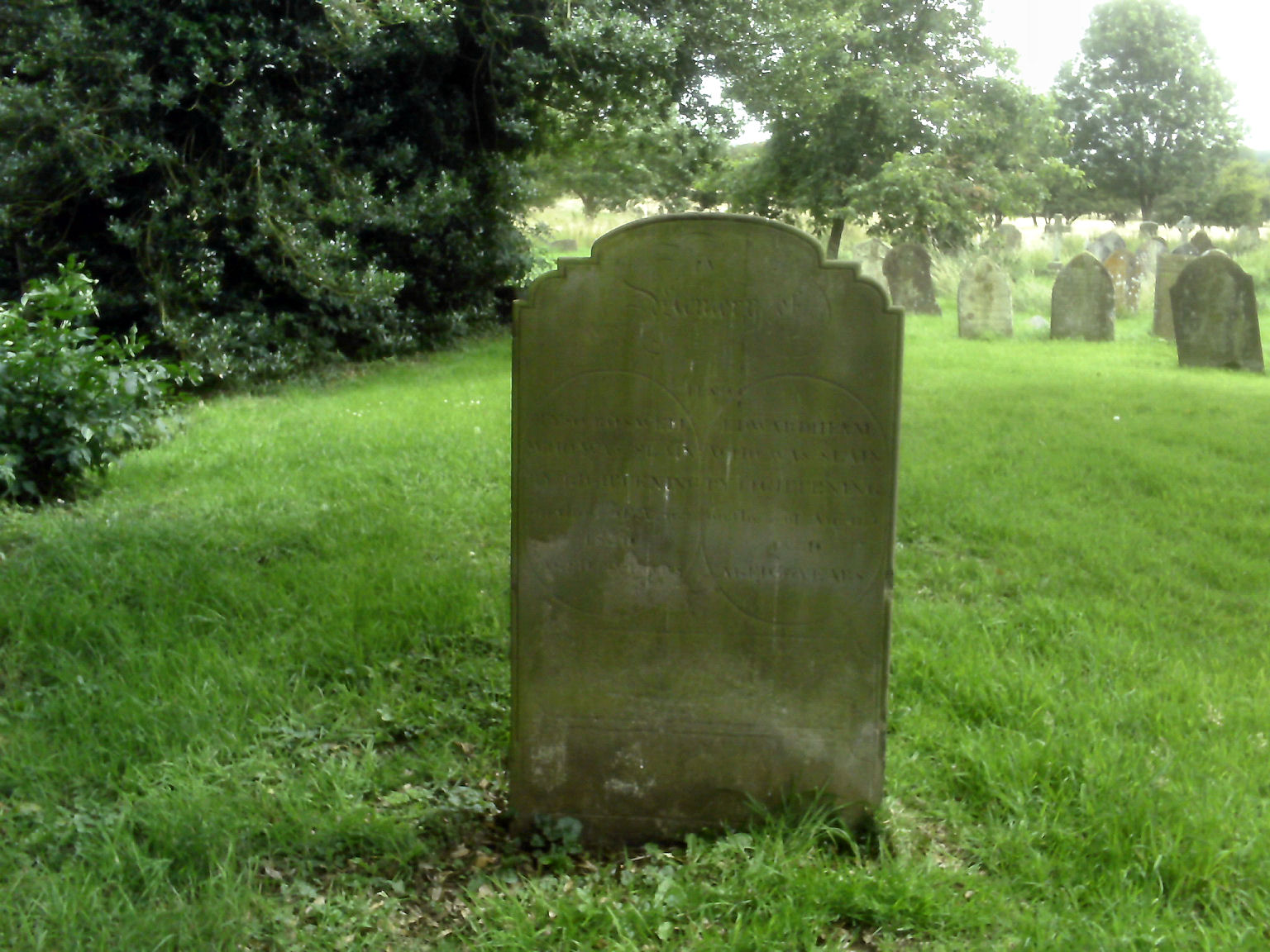
Tyso Boswell and Edward Hearn (or Heron) double grave at Tetford

A place of worship has stood on the site of the Church of St Mary for over 900 years. The present building erected in the 14th century is built of local greenstone and had a tower added in the 15th century. Outside the north-east of the chancel is a headstone to two gypsies, Tyso Boswell and Edward Hearn, killed by lightning on the eve of Horncastle Fair in 1831.

Inside the church is a tablet, high up to on the right-hand side of the main area of worship, to Captain Edward Dymoke who was the champion of George II. The inscription reads: "To the Memory of Captain Edward Dymoke, cousin of Lewis Dymoke of Scrivelsby. Champion to King George 2nd. Interred March 5th 1739 also of John Dymoke Gent, nephew of the above. Interred July 23rd. 1748. Also of Mrs. Jane Dymoke his wife, Interred July 27th. 1745." Above the tablet is displayed a Roundhead helmet, breast and back plates. Perhaps associated with the site of the Battle of Winceby 1643 in which Cromwell nearly lost his life. Winceby being 6 miles south of Tetford.

The church was restored in 1910 and seats about 250.

=== Tetford & Salmonby Scarecrow Festival ===
Tetford and its neighbour Salmonby hold an annual Scarecrow Festival. Households build scarecrows and display them outside their houses during May every year. The scarecrows are modelled on TV and films persons, historic figures, contemporary figures and fictional icons. The Festival is largely dedicated to raising funds for the 14th-century church, however, part of the proceeds of the weekend are shared with other local charitable organisations in the village. The Scarecrow Trail is just over 1 mile (1.6 km) long.
