= Thimbleby, Lincolnshire =

Village and civil parish in the East Lindsey district of Lincolnshire, England

Coordinates: 53.212208°N 0.151554°W

Thimbleby
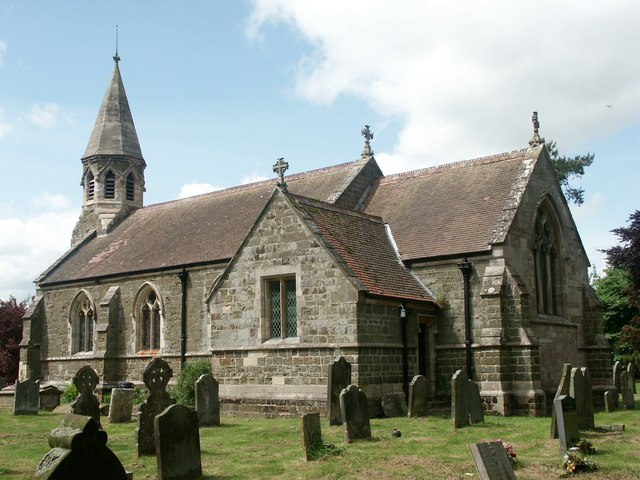
- St Margaret's Church, Thimbleby

- Location within Lincolnshire
- Population: 258 (2011)
- OS grid reference: TF235699
  - London: 120 mi (190 km) S
- District: East Lindsey
- Shire county: Lincolnshire
- Region: East Midlands
- Country: England
- Sovereign state: United Kingdom
- Post town: Horncastle
- Postcode district: LN9
- Police: Lincolnshire
- Fire: Lincolnshire
- Ambulance: East Midlands
- UK Parliament: Louth and Horncastle

Thimbleby is a village and civil parish in the East Lindsey district of Lincolnshire, England. It is situated approximately 1 mile (1.6 km) west from the A158 road and the town of Horncastle.

Thimbleby is listed in the Domesday Book of 1086 as "Stimbelbi", with 67 households, which at the time was considered very large. The Lord of the manor was King William I.

The church is dedicated to Saint Margaret and is a Grade II listed building built of greenstone in 1744 to replace a medieval church on the same site, and was largely rebuilt in 1879 by James Fowler of Louth. It was closed in December 2010 due to unsafe stonework and electrical wiring.

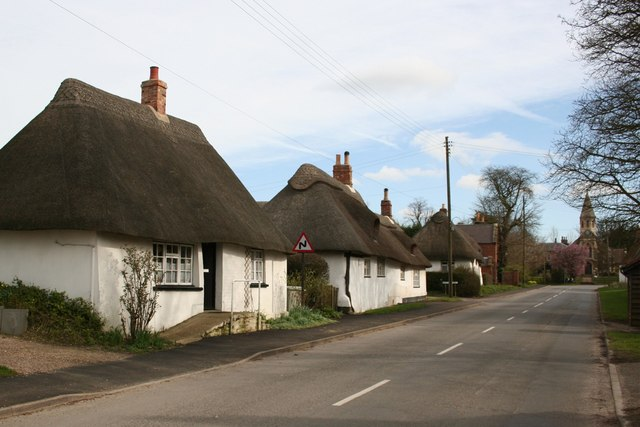
Thimbleby cottages

The village hall was built in 1856, originally as a school, and is Grade II listed.

The old village pump survives, dating from 1857, standing in a three sided red-brick enclosure.

There are several cottages, some mud and stud, some thatched, in Thimbleby, including White Cottage, dating from the 16th century, Rose Cottage, and The Cabin, both of which date from the 17th century, and the Old Manor dating from the 18th century.

The village has a public house, The Durham Ox.
