= Woodhall Spa railway station =

Former railway station in Lincolnshire, England

Coordinates: 53.1523°N 0.2148°W

Woodhall Spa
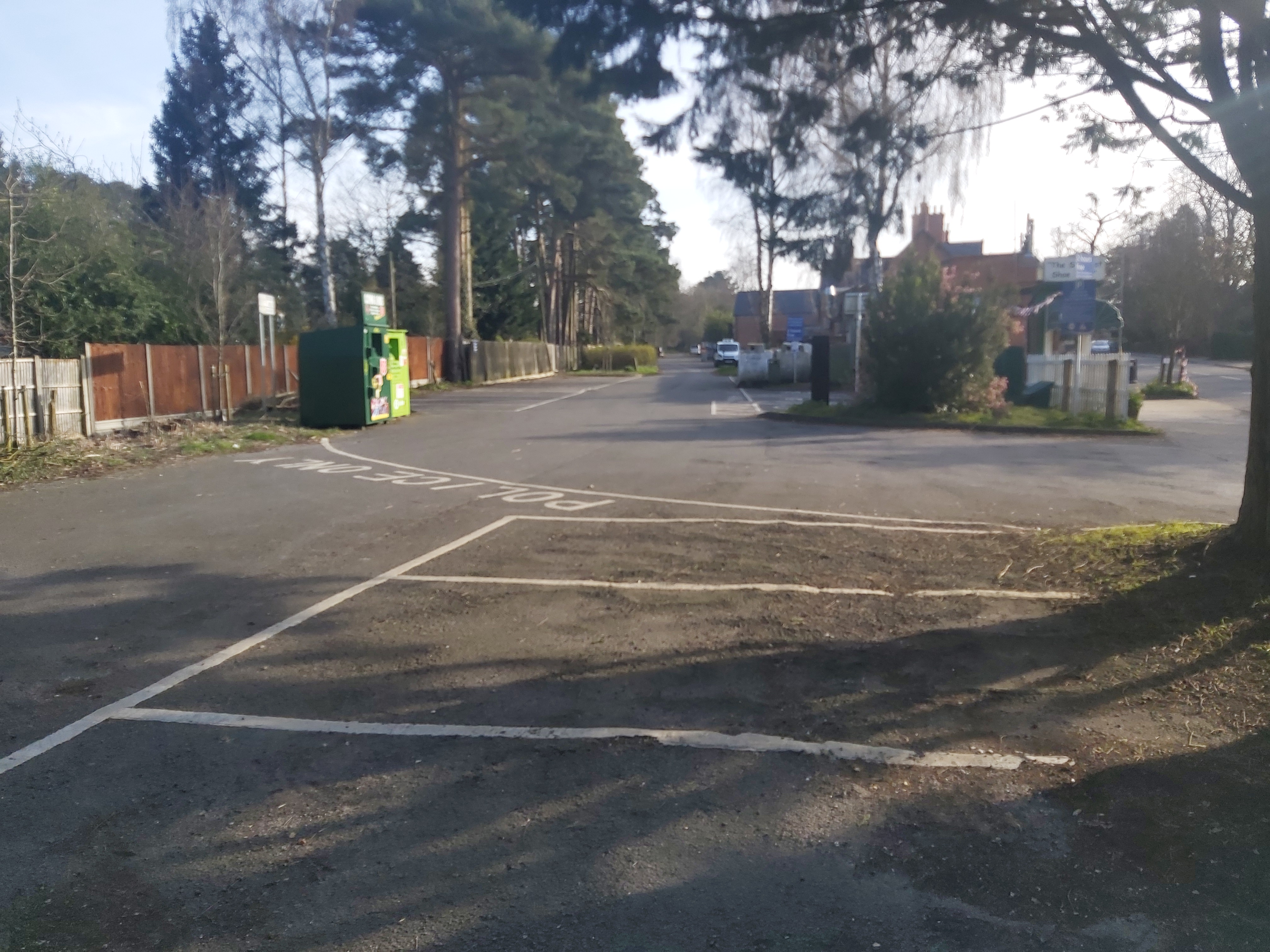
- The site of Woodhall Spa station in 2020. The buildings to the right are shops that once backed onto the station on the parade.

General information
- Location: Woodhall Spa, Lincolnshire; England
- Platforms: 1

Other information
- Status: Disused

History
- Original company: Horncastle Railway
- Pre-grouping: Great Northern Railway
- Post-grouping: LNER

Key dates
- 11 August 1855: opened
- 13 September 1954: closed (passenger)
- 27 April 1964: closed for freight
Location

Woodhall Spa railway station was a station in Woodhall Spa, Lincolnshire, on a small branch line running north from Woodhall Junction to Horncastle. Both the station and the line are now closed.

In 1846 the Great Northern rail company purchased the land to build a 58 miles (93 km) rail link from Peterborough to Lincoln via Spalding and Boston with the Boston to Lincoln section being built along the banks of the River Witham. Works commenced in 1847 and the line opened on 17 October 1848. The Kirkstead Station, later to be renamed the Woodhall Junction, was one of seven between Lincoln and Boston. To the north were Stixwould, Southrey and Bardney and to the south were Tattershall, Dogdyke and Langrick.

== Horncastle branch ==
In 1853 three local businessmen negotiated with the GNR with a view to opening a branch of the line, the Horncastle Branch, from the Woodhall Junction to Horncastle. They formed the Horncastle and Kirkstead Junction Railway Company to promote the railway, and the line was opened on 11 August 1855 and transported the gentry into the heart of Woodhall where they could easily get to the hotels and public attractions. The line also provided a better means of transport for goods being transported to and from Horncastle than the River Bain.

== Closure ==
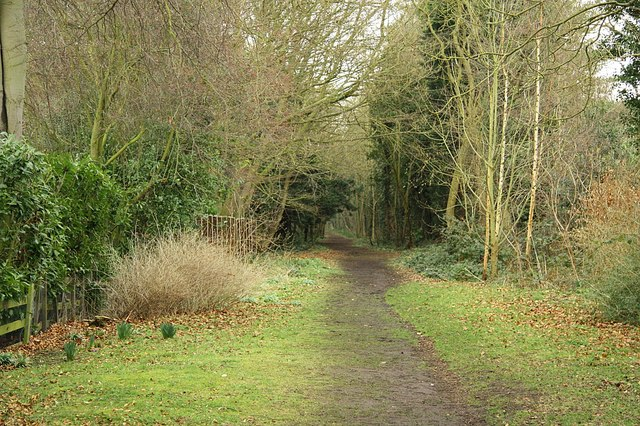
Spa Trail

The line closed for passengers from 13 September 1954 but freight traffic continued along the line until 6 April 1971 and demolition came soon after.

After the track was removed the land was sold off to various land owners, mostly local farmers, but some has been used to recently create a paved walk and cycle path, called The Water Rail Way, from Kirkstead to Lincoln. As of summer 2009 the path is complete and open for public use.

The course of the Horncastle Branch to Horncastle has also been turned into a bridleway, The Spa Trail, allowing for a safe journey to Horncastle that is used by 15,000 people a year. It is a section on the Viking Way.

Preceding station	Disused railways	Following station
Woodhall Junction	Great Northern Railway; Horncastle Railway	Horncastle
