= Salmonby =

Village in the East Lindsey district of Lincolnshire, England

Coordinates: 53.241487°N 0.014882°W

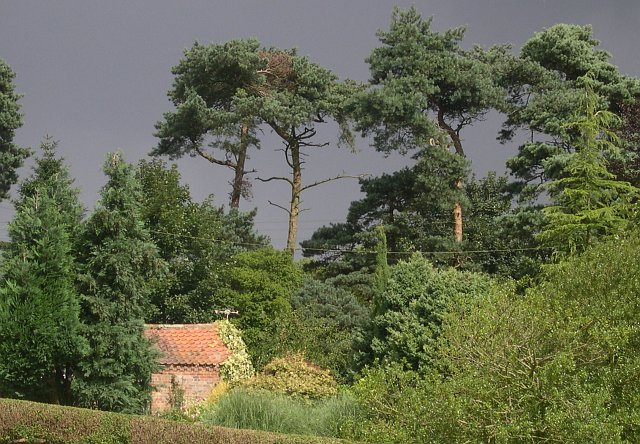
- Salmonby

- Location within Lincolnshire
- OS grid reference: TF325734
  - London: 120 mi (190 km) S
- Civil parish: Tetford
- District: East Lindsey
- Shire county: Lincolnshire
- Region: East Midlands
- Country: England
- Sovereign state: United Kingdom
- Post town: Horncastle
- Postcode district: LN9
- Police: Lincolnshire
- Fire: Lincolnshire
- Ambulance: East Midlands
- UK Parliament: Louth and Horncastle

Salmonby is a village in the civil parish of Tetford, in the East Lindsey district of Lincolnshire, England. It is situated 5.5 miles (8.9 km) north-east from Horncastle, 10 miles (16 km) south from Louth and 8 miles (13 km) north-west from Spilsby. Salmonby lies within the Lincolnshire Wolds, a designated Area of Outstanding Natural Beauty. Tetford lies to the north-east and Somersby to the south.

The parish covered about 1,000 acres (4.0 km^{2}), and contains a chalybeate spring, whose waters eventually join the Steeping River near Spilsby.

== History ==
An upper palaeolithic core (a piece of flint which has been repeatedly used to flake material in order to make flint tools) was found near Salmonby. The core was in good condition and has been dated at 50,000 - 10,000 years old. The area was a source of blue phosphate of iron and a great deal of iron oxide ore.

Salmonby Church, dedicated to St Margaret, was a medieval construction, largely rebuilt in 1871. It was closed and deconsecrated in 1973, then demolished in 1978, with only a small wooden gate leading to the churchyard, and a few photographs, remaining:

In 1971 the civil parish had a population of 58. On 1 April 1987 the parish was abolished and merged with Tetford.

== Community ==
The village has a public house, the Cross Keys Inn & Restaurant, fishing lakes, cottages and a Caravan Club CL site. There is a picnic area at a nearby sandstone cliff wall; the wall has carved reliefs of unknown origin or age.

=== Tetford and Salmonby Scarecrow Festival ===
Tetford and Salmonby hold an annual weekend Scarecrow Festival. Villagers build scarecrows modelled on TV and film personalities, historic and contemporary figures and fictional icons, and display them outside their houses each year during May. A Scarecrow Trail is just over 1 mile (1.6 km) away. The event raises funds for Tetford church and local charities.
