= Cagthorpe =

Suburb of Horncastle, Lincolnshire, England

Coordinates: 53.206727°N 0.115756°W

- Location within Lincolnshire
- OS grid reference: TF259693
  - London: 115 mi (185 km) S
- Civil parish: Horncastle
- District: East Lindsey
- Shire county: Lincolnshire
- Region: East Midlands
- Country: England
- Sovereign state: United Kingdom
- Post town: Horncastle
- Postcode district: LN9
- Police: Lincolnshire
- Fire: Lincolnshire
- Ambulance: East Midlands
- UK Parliament: Louth and Horncastle (UK Parliament constituency)

Cagthorpe is suburb of the town of Horncastle, Lincolnshire, England. It is south of, and separated from, the historic town centre by the re-aligned River Waring and the A158 (Jubilee Way).

Cagthorpe is accessible by vehicle only from The Wong and Hopton Street. It is accessible on foot from Coronation Walk which runs to the town Swimming Pool, across a footbridge over the disused Horncastle Navigation Canal, and onto West Street, and from St. Mary's Square across the pedestrian crossing that crosses Jubilee Way.

== History ==
It is unusual in that the street is simply named 'Cagthorpe' leading to the whole area being known by that name. It was once a separate village (with roots as an Anglo-Saxon settlement, separate from the Roman town of Horncastle itself).

Cagthorpe

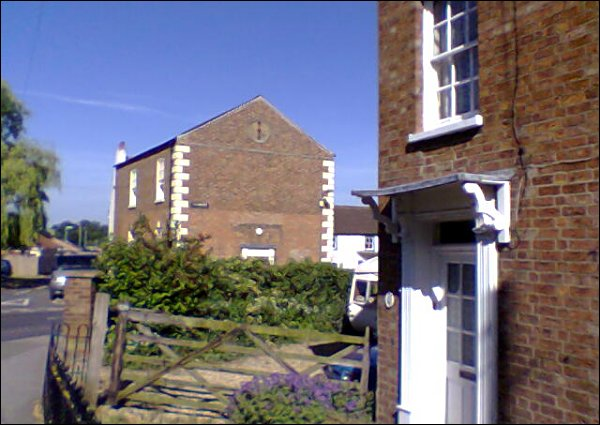
Cagthorpe

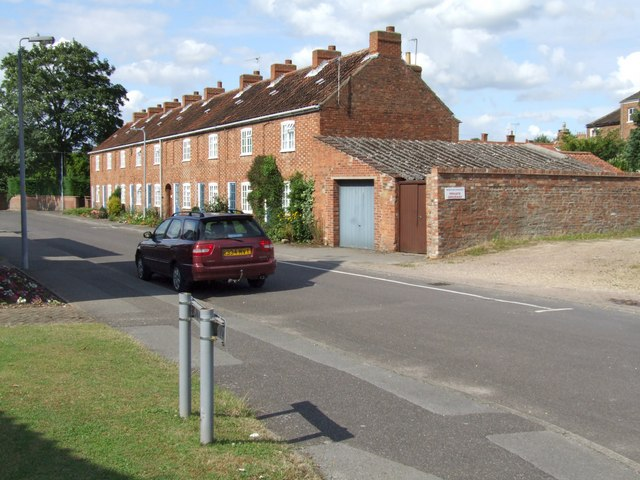
Waring Street

A Baptist chapel was built in Cagthorpe in 1767. Originally one story, structural alterations were made in 1843 with addition of a second floor. It was not until 1892 that it was registered as a place of worship. It was restored in 1893, and it is now a Grade II listed building and the headquarters of the Salvation Army.

The first Wesleyan Methodist chapel was erected in Cagthorpe in about 1786, and stood a few yards north of the Baptist place of worship, close to the north west corner of the Wong. It was later replaced, and in 1836 a third chapel was begun, on a new site in Union Street, (now Queen street) and opened on Good Friday the following year.

The Wesleyans opened a day school, converted from a foundry, in 1860. It moved to premises in Cagthorpe in 1905, and it was sold to Lindsey County Council in 1934, when it became Cagthorpe Council School. It was closed in 1937 and reopened as Horncastle Cagthorpe Senior Council School. It became Horncastle Secondary Modern in 1946. New buildings were opened in 1963 and the name again changed to Horncastle Banovallum Secondary School. It later became a comprehensive and was known was Horncastle Banovallum School by 1997.

The town's youth club is also situated on Cagthorpe.
