= Horncastle railway station =

Former railway station in Lincolnshire, England

Horncastle
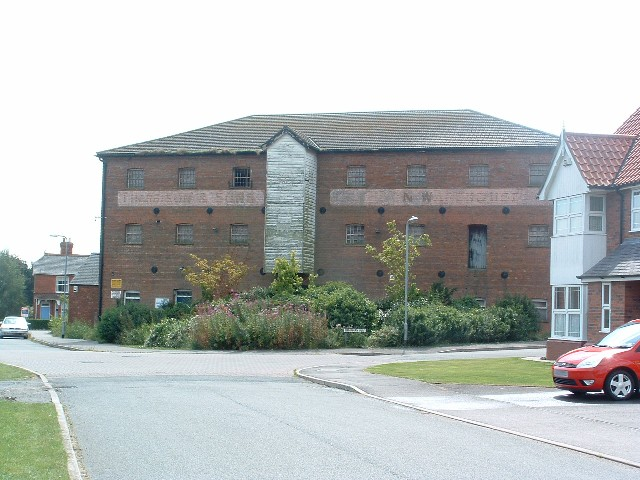
- Horncastle granary in 2005

General information
- Location: Horncastle, Lincolnshire; England
- Coordinates: 53.2065°N 0.1244°W
- Platforms: 1

Other information
- Status: Disused

History
- Original company: Horncastle Railway
- Pre-grouping: Great Northern Railway
- Post-grouping: LNER

Key dates
- 11 August 1855: opened
- 13 September 1954: closed (passenger)
- 5 April 1971: closed (goods)
Location

Horncastle railway station was a station in Horncastle, Lincolnshire, England. It was at the end of a short branch line that ran from Woodhall Junction which opened on 11 August 1855. Like many fairly rural stations it was eventually shut as the rail network was cut back, with passenger service withdrawn from 13 September 1954 and goods and freight terminating on 5 April 1971.

The station building was demolished in 1985 and the site is now occupied by Bush Tyres and by the Granary Way Housing Estate. The only surviving evidence is a gate post at the entrance to the goods yards.

The track bed to Woodhall Spa survives as a long-distance footpath.

Preceding station	Disused railways	Following station
Woodhall Spa	Great Northern Railway; Horncastle Railway	Terminus
