= Horncastle Railway =

Railway company in Lincolnshire, England

The Horncastle Railway (sometimes the Horncastle and Kirkstead Junction Railway or the Horncastle and Woodhall Junction Railway) was a seven mile long single track branch railway line in Lincolnshire, England, that ran from Horncastle to Woodhall Junction (opened as Kirkstead) on the Great Northern Railway (GNR) line between Boston and Lincoln. There was one intermediate station, Woodhall Spa.

The line opened in 1855 and was worked by the GNR, but the Horncastle Railway Company remained as an independent entity until 1923. The short line suffered from road competition after that time, and the passenger service was withdrawn in 1954, although a goods service was retained until 1971. There is now no railway activity on the former line.

== Origins ==
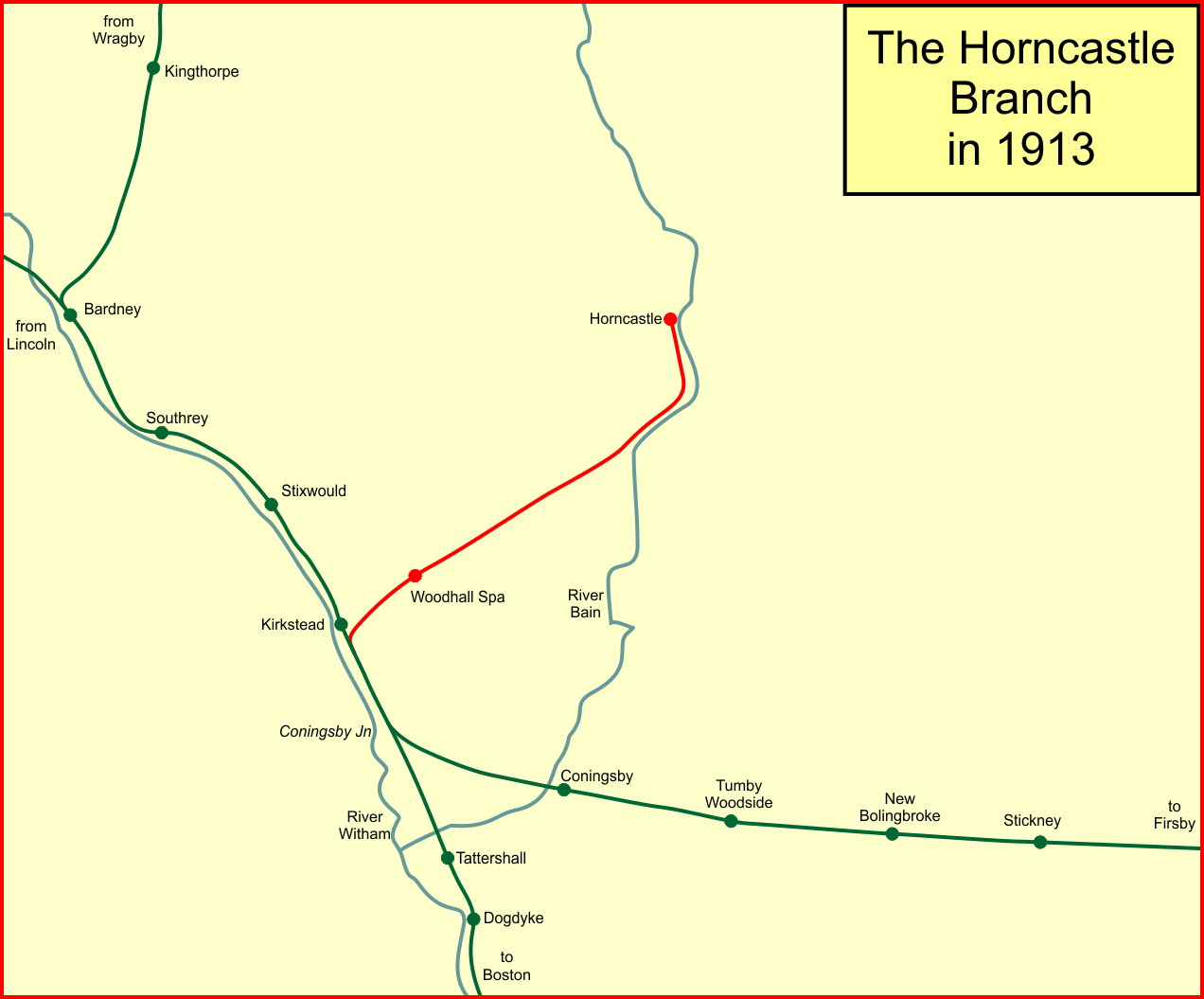
The Horncastle branch after opening of the Coningsby line

In the first decades of the 19th century Horncastle had become an important centre for the buying and selling of horses, and it was a centre for agriculture in the district, with a significant population. (Note: Horncastle Poor Law Union, from the 1851 census, gives 25,089 for 1851. Other sources gives 5,017 for the civil parish, or 280 for the town.)

At the same time Woodhall Spa had developed as a location where people went to enjoy the curative properties of the spring water which contained iodine and bromine. A local businessman named Thomas Hotchkiss had promoted the waters' curative properties, especially for gout.

Local people believed a railway connection was a means to developing Horncastle; between 1845 and 1847 there were six unsuccessful attempts to promote a railway connection to the town. The Great Northern Railway operated the nearby main line at Kirkstead, opened in 1848. In 1851 the GNR built a canal wharf at Dogdyke, enabling to serve Horncastle using the canal as a branch.

On 27 September 1853 a meeting was held at the Bull Inn, Horncastle, "for the purpose of taking into consideration the propriety of establishing a line of railway between Horncastle and Kirkstead station on the Great Northern loop line." The meeting resolved that "the formation of a branch railway from the Kirkstead station to Horncastle would greatly promote the commercial and agricultural interests of the town and neighbourhood." A sub-committee was appointed "to confer with the Great Northern Company as to working of the proposed branch railway that company." This resulted in the GNR agreeing to work the line for 50% of receipts.

The Stamford Mercury reported that "the meeting passed off vary amicably, with the slight exception of some very irrelevant observations made by Mr. Brailsford, of Toft Grange, respecting compensation to the Navigation Company. The Horncastle Canal evidently saw the promotion of a railway as inimical to its interests, and the canal company pressed its opposition in the parliamentary hearings for the line. In addition, opinion formers in Horncastle were concerned that local people would purchase goods in Boston or Lincoln by travelling there by train, rather than supporting local businesses.

Horncastle Railway Act 1854
- Act of Parliament
- Parliament of the United Kingdom
- Long title: An Act for making a Railway from Horncastle in Lincolnshire to the Kirkstead Station of the Great Northern Railway.
- Citation: 17 & 18 Vict. c. cxliii

Dates
- Royal assent: 10 July 1854

Text of statute as originally enacted

Eventually, the Horncastle Railway was authorised by the Horncastle Railway Act 1854 (Note: Promoted as the Horncastle and Kirkstead Junction Railway Bill.) (17 & 18 Vict. c. cxliii) on 10 July 1854; share capital was £48,000, with borrowing powers of £13,000. (Note: It was promoted as the Horncastle and Kirkstead Railway, but "took its new title" (implying "Horncastle Railway") on 10 July 1854. Conversely, in a later formal report on authorised railways, The Times newspaper of 2 January 1855 used the longer name.) The local company built the line, using the contractor Thomas Brassey; Brassey had taken £15,000 in shares on the understanding that he would be appointed as the contractor. The 1854 – 1855 winter was exceptionally severe, and work did not start until March 1855.

The Railway shall commence in the Parish of Horncastle, on the South Side of the Road leading from Horncastle to Langton, and terminate by a Junction with the Great Northern Railway in or near to the Kirkstead Station of the same Railway.

An intermediate station was to have been made at Roughton but this was not proceeded with and the only intermediate station was Woodhall Spa.

The line was inspected for Board of Trade approval for opening by Lt-Colonel Wynne on 6 August 1855. However he reported that "I found the permanent way, generally, in a very incomplete state, and the rails especially so much out of adjustment, that I am of the opinion that the Horncastle Railway cannot be opened without danger to the public using the same".

The Lincolnshire Chronicle reported that "Arrangements were made for running special trains ... during the day. This part of the proceedings was... obliged to be abandoned, in consequence of the government inspector (Col. Wynne), who passed over the line on Monday last, having declined to certify the line as fit for passenger-traffic. The late heavy rains having caused the soil to settle unequally in various parts of the line, is reported to be the cause of the withholding of the certificate; but, as this is mere temporary derangement, which a few days' labour will suffice to remedy, the opening of the line for regular traffic will not be long deferred."

The line could not therefore be opened for passenger purposes, and it was opened for "light goods" only on 11 August 1855. An opening ceremony for the line had been arranged for that day, and it went ahead anyway, despite the refusal for passenger operation. Rectification work must have been accomplished swiftly, for on 11 August 1855 Lt-Colonel Yolland and Lt-Colonel Wynne inspected the line and found it satisfactory.

== Opening ==
The line opened fully on 26 September 1855. The directors had negotiated with the Great Northern Railway to work their line; the GNR operated the adjacent main line, between Lincoln and Boston. The new branch was 7 1/2 miles in length from a junction at Kirkstead, on the main line. The junction at Kirkstead faced away from Kirkstead station, towards Boston, so branch trains had to reverse direction at the junction. Stations on the branch were Woodhall Spa and Horncastle.

The reference to light goods probably refers to packages that could be manhandled on the passenger platform, prior to commissioning of the goods shed and cranage facilities; the line opened fully for the latter traffic on 26 September 1855.

The total earnings for the part year from 8 August to the end of 1855, were £1,537. Part that sum was payable to the Great Northern Railway for working the line and for use of Kirkstead GNR station; £952 was the Horncastle Railway's portion. A dividend of 3s ld. per share, stated to be "equivalent to 4% per annum upon the share capital of the company (less income-tax), leaving a balance of 331. 16s. 7d. for the next account."

== Passenger and goods services ==
The line was originally operated under the "one engine in steam" system, but from 3 June 1889 a block post was instituted at Woodhall Spa together with a crossing loop, and block working was operated. For some years Woodhall Spa had no goods facility; a siding for the purpose was provided from 4 April 1887.

In 1887 the passenger train service consisted of eight trains each way daily; the journey time was 28 minutes; there were additional trains on Monday, Tuesday, Thursday and Saturday and from 1898 one train conveyed a through coach from London. There was a Sunday service at first, but this was discontinued in June 1868. In 1910 the basic train service was six journeys each way with additional market-day services, but by 1938 it had risen again to eight with an additional service on Saturdays.

The Autumn Horncastle horse fairs were renowned for the quality of the animals being sold, and the railway provided the means for local horses to be brought in, and despatched to their new owners at destinations countrywide. The late 19th century were the peak years and up to 150 horses arrived at the station every day for several days before the start of the fair. However, horse trading declined after 1918 as the use of road transport increased.

Despite the railway, Horncastle never developed industrially. In 1890 the Board of Trade pressed the proprietors of the railway to improve it in certain respects. The directors considered that this might be the opportune time to sell the line to the Great Northern Railway. They offered to do so on the basis of £10 Horncastle Railway Company shares being exchanged for £18 face value of GNR shares. The GNR considered this too high a price, but assisted the Horncastle Railway Company in obtaining a loan for the necessary work.

== Post grouping ==
After World War I the branch passenger trains were operated by a two coach set that had been converted from GNR steam railmotors nos 5 and 6. These vehicles were used until the end of passenger services on the line. (They were subsequently retained in service elsewhere, until 1959.) Following the Grouping Act, Kirkstead was renamed Woodhall Junction on 10 July 1922.

The Horncastle Railway Company continued in existence until the grouping of the railways in 1923, following the Railways Act 1922; the company had never operated its own trains and was simply a financial entity. Ownership of the line passed to the London and North Eastern Railway. It had "rarely" paid less than 6% in dividend.

Due to the outbreak of hostilities, the line was closed to passenger operation on 11 September 1939, but the service was reinstated from 4 December 1939.

== Nationalisation and closure ==
In 1948 nationalisation of the railways took place, and British Railways took control. For some years the passenger carryings on the line were declining, and the passenger service was discontinued from 13 September 1954, following the increase of road bus competition. One goods train ran daily on the line until closure on 5 April 1971, although Woodhall Spa's goods siding had closed on 27 April 1964. For six months prior to final closure, after the passenger services on the line from Lincoln to Coningsby stopped, Horncastle goods trains were the only users of the former Loop Line between Bardney and Woodhall Junction.

The solum of the line from Horncastle to Woodhall Spa was later acquired by Lincolnshire County Council and is now part of the Viking Way and Spa Trail long-distance footpaths.

== See also ==
- Lincolnshire lines of the Great Northern Railway
