= Thornton, Lincolnshire =

Village in England

Coordinates: 53.192330°N 0.137656°W

Thornton
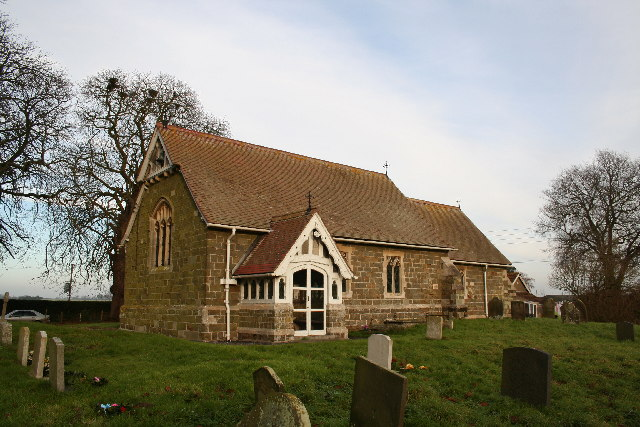
- St Wilfrid's Church, Thornton

- Location within Lincolnshire
- OS grid reference: TF245677
  - London: 120 mi (190 km) S
- Civil parish: Roughton
- District: East Lindsey
- Shire county: Lincolnshire
- Region: East Midlands
- Country: England
- Sovereign state: United Kingdom
- Post town: Horncastle
- Postcode district: LN9
- Police: Lincolnshire
- Fire: Lincolnshire
- Ambulance: East Midlands
- UK Parliament: Louth and Horncastle

Thornton, or Thornton by Horncastle, is a village in the civil parish of Roughton, in the East Lindsey district of Lincolnshire, England. It is situated on the B1191 road, 1 mile (1.6 km) west from the A153, and 1.5 miles (2.4 km) south-west from Horncastle town centre. In 1971 the parish had a population of 57. On 1 April 1987 the parish was abolished and merged with Roughton.

The village is mentioned in the 1086 Domesday Book, with 19 households and Robert the Bursar as Lord of the manor.

The greenstone parish church is dedicated to Saint Wilfrid and is a Grade II listed building dating from the 15th century and restored in 1890 by Ewan Christian.
