= Colin Bailey (police officer) =

British police officer

Chief Constable Colin Frederick Bailey QPM
- Born: 17 October 1943 (age 82)
- Occupation: retired police officer

Colin Frederick Bailey, QPM (born 17 October 1943) is a British retired senior police officer. Between 1995 and 2000, he served as the Chief Constable of Nottinghamshire Constabulary. Bailey was educated at Queen Elizabeth's Grammar School, Horncastle and the University of Sheffield. He was with the Lincolnshire Constabulary from 1960 to 1986. He was Assistant Chief Constable of West Yorkshire Police from 1986 to 1990; and Deputy Chief Constable of Nottinghamshire Constabulary from 1990 to 1995.
