= Banovallum School =

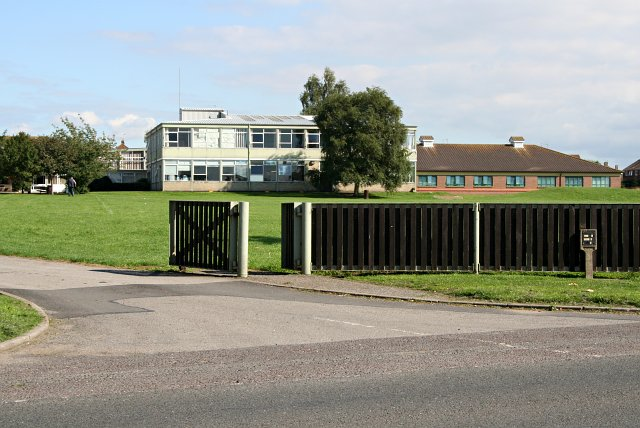

Location
- Boston Road; Horncastle, Lincolnshire, LN9 6DA; England; 53°12′10″N 0°06′34″W

Information
- Type: Academy
- Local authority: Lincolnshire
- Department for Education URN: 141581 Tables
- Ofsted: Reports
- Headteacher: Jennifer Kirkwood
- Staff: 54
- Gender: Coeducational
- Age: 11 to 16
- Enrolment: 616 pupils
- Houses: Hurricane, Lancaster; Spitfire
- Colour
- Website: https://www.banovallumschool.co.uk

The Banovallum School is a co-educational secondary school located in Horncastle, Lincolnshire, England.

== History ==
The school was built in the early 1960s. The previous school it replaced was called the Cagthorpe School. It is a specialist science college. In September 2008, a new block was opened to the rear of the school. The new block is home to: Two Art Studios, A Textiles and Food Technology Workrooms; Technology Workshops and a Music Suite with industry standard recording studio and 4 small practice rooms. Also in 2008 the Science block was extended adding a further two Science Laboratories. The new addition to the school was built by the Gelder Group of Sturton by Stow.

In May 2008, the county council opened a £400,000 children's centre, based at the school.

In December 2014 Banovallum School converted to academy status and is now independent of local authority control. However the school continues to coordinate with Lincolnshire County Council for admissions.

== Admissions ==
It is situated on the A153, 500m to the south of the town. The school day is from 8.50am until 3.35pm.

The school has three houses, named after RAF planes: Hurricane , Lancaster , Spitfire . These two last aircraft, have flown operationally from the nearby RAF Coningsby. in recent years the house system has decreased from 5 to 3 with the disbanding of Tornado , Jaguar , both of which existed when the House system was brought into effect in 2006. After the first year, Jaguar house was 'disbanded' leaving the four houses that remain.

In the '70s and '80s there were four houses named after famous Lincolnshire characters from history. The houses were: Franklin , Hereward , Newton and Tennyson .

The gym hosts regional gymnastic competitions, and is the home of Banovallum Gymnastics Club.

== Academic performance ==
There is no sixth form provision, the nearest sixth form being at Queen Elizabeth's Grammar School, also in Horncastle.
