= Stanhope Hall =

Municipal building in Horncastle, Lincolnshire, England

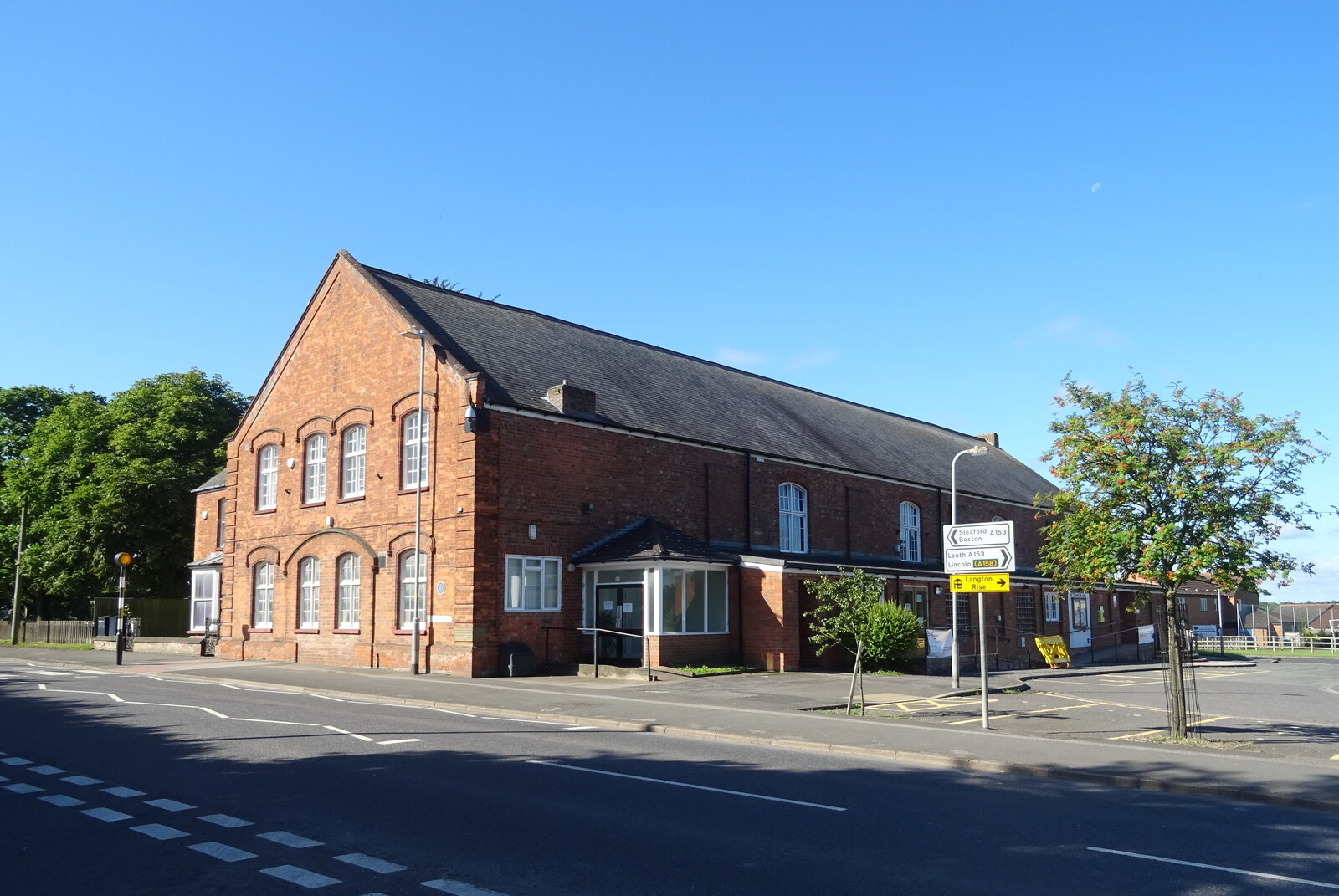
- The building in 2020

- Shown in Lincolnshire
- 53.2048°N 0.1142°W
- Location: Boston Road, Horncastle

History
- Built: 1903

Site notes
- Architectural style: Victorian style

The Stanhope Hall, formerly Horncastle Town Hall, is a municipal building in Boston Road in Horncastle, a town in Lincolnshire in England. The building began life as a drill hall, then became a town hall and finally became a community hall.

== History ==
The building was commissioned as a drill hall for local reservists and was financed by public subscription. The reservists had previously trained in the local British School on The Wong, but by the late 19th century, these facilities were deemed inadequate. The site chosen, which was in the southeast corner of what had been the old Cattle Market, was made available by the local landowner and former Secretary of State for War, Edward Stanhope.

The foundation stone for the new building was laid with full masonic honours by the Provincial Grand Master of Lincolnshire, Charles Pelham, 4th Earl of Yarborough, on 13 June 1901. It was designed in the Victorian style, built in red brick at a cost of £2,500 and was completed in around 1903. The design of the main block, which stretched well back from Boston Road, involved a symmetrical main frontage of four bays facing onto the road. It was fenestrated by segmental headed cross-windows on both floors, with hood moulds above, and was gabled. There was a caretaker's house, which was set back from the road, on the south side of the main block; there was also a porch and a lean-to, which may have been of later construction, on the north side of the main block. Internally, the principal rooms were the main hall, and a smallbore rifle shooting range.

The building served as the drill hall for G Company of the 4th (Militia) Battalion Lincolnshire Regiment. The name of unit was adjusted to G Company 4th Battalion Lincolnshire Regiment in 1908. The drill hall was used by the local Voluntary Aid Detachment as a Red Cross Hospital during the First World War and then served as a base for recuperating service personnel during the Second World War. The battalion was reconstituted as part of the Territorial Army in 1947 and absorbed the 6th Battalion becoming the 4th / 6th battalion in 1950.

Following the defence cutbacks of the 1960s, the drill hall closed, and the building was acquired for municipal use by Horncastle urban district council in 1970. It remained the local seat of government until the enlarged East Lindsey District Council was formed in 1974. The council used the town hall as a refuge for around 70 people rendered homeless by coastal flooding in April 1981.

East Lindsey Council continued to use the building for the delivery of local services but in 2005 proposed that it be demolished to save on maintenance costs. However, a community petition and judicial review against the demolition led, in 2010, to its transfer to Horncastle Town Council, and then to a community organisation. The organisation subsequently let contracts for the refurbishment of the hall, to provide six office units, a hall with a capacity of 350 people, two meeting rooms, a bar and a kitchen. It adopted the name "The Stanhope Hall" to commemorate its original benefactor.
