= Dalderby =

Village in the East Lindsey district of Lincolnshire, England

Coordinates: 53.175477°N 0.132368°W

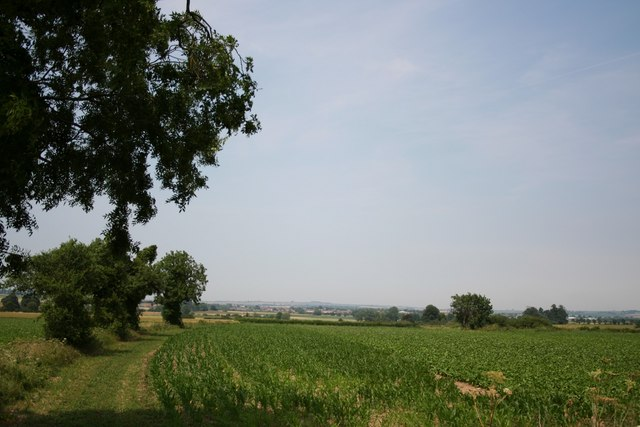
- View across farmland from Dalderby

- Location within Lincolnshire
- OS grid reference: TF249658
  - London: 115 mi (185 km) S
- Civil parish: Roughton
- District: East Lindsey
- Shire county: Lincolnshire
- Region: East Midlands
- Country: England
- Sovereign state: United Kingdom
- Post town: Horncastle
- Postcode district: LN9
- Police: Lincolnshire
- Fire: Lincolnshire
- Ambulance: East Midlands
- UK Parliament: Louth and Horncastle

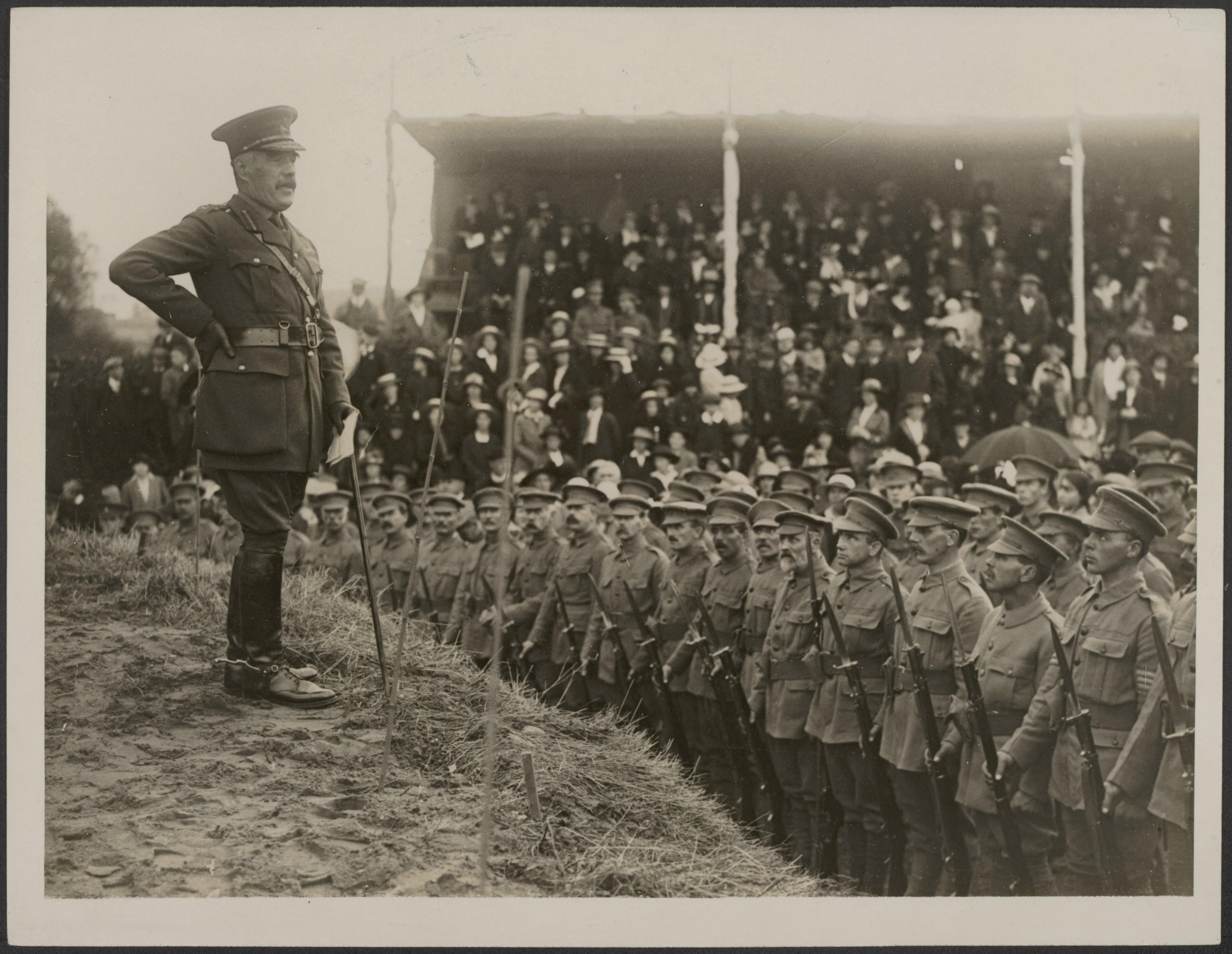
General Sir William Robertson, chief of the Imperial General Staff, 1916–18, unveiling a War Cross in the village

Dalderby is a village and former civil parish, now in the parish of Roughton, in the East Lindsey district of Lincolnshire, England. It is situated approximately 3 miles (5 km) south from Horncastle, on the A153 road. In 1931 the parish had a population of 19. On 1 April 1936 the parish was abolished and merged with Roughton.

Dalderby once had an Anglican parish church dedicated to Saint Martin. It was demolished in 1742, possibly because of a decline in village population.

Teapot Hall was an early 19th-century one-roomed cottage with a thatched roof. However it was long regarded as a medieval building, of considerable historical importance as a survival of an early timber-framed house. In 1945 it was burnt down accidentally during VJ Day celebrations, and nothing remains today. It was at this point that its true date was discovered.

Manor Farmhouse is a Grade II listed building that dates from the 17th century. It has a thatched roof. Dado paneling inside the building reputedly was taken from the demolished St. Martin's Church.

Supposedly the village sent the largest proportion of its men to fight in World War I of any village in the country. A "War Cross", or temporary stand-in for a permanent war memorial, was unveiled there by General Sir William Robertson, chief of the Imperial General Staff from 1916 to 1918.
