= Fulletby =

Village and a civil parish in the East Lindsey district of Lincolnshire, England

Coordinates: 53.240393°N 0.056914°W

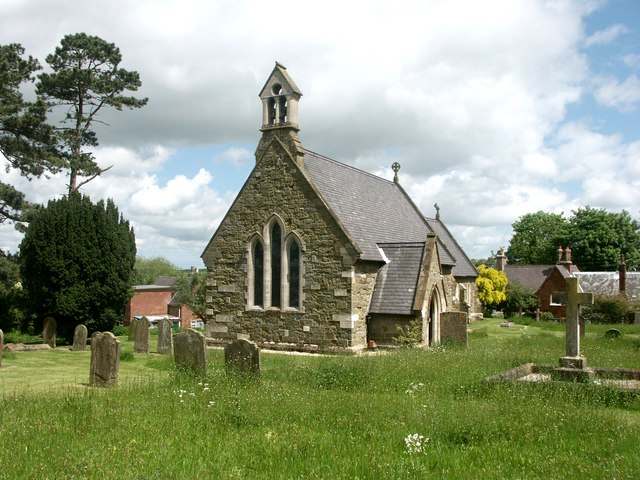
- Church of St Andrew, Fulletby

- Location within Lincolnshire
- Population: 78 (2001)
- OS grid reference: TF297732
  - London: 120 mi (190 km) S
- District: East Lindsey
- Shire county: Lincolnshire
- Region: East Midlands
- Country: England
- Sovereign state: United Kingdom
- Post town: Horncastle
- Postcode district: LN9
- Police: Lincolnshire
- Fire: Lincolnshire
- Ambulance: East Midlands
- UK Parliament: Louth and Horncastle

Fulletby is a village and a civil parish in the East Lindsey district of Lincolnshire, England. It is in the Lincolnshire Wolds, and 3 miles (5 km) north-east from Horncastle, 9 miles (14 km) south from Louth, and 8 miles (13 km) north-west from Spilsby. The parish covers approximately 1,950 acres (8 km^{2}). At the time of the 2011 census the population remained less than 100 and is included in the civil parish of Low Toynton.

== History ==
The village is listed in the 1086 Domesday Book.

In 1841 the village consisted primarily of mud-and-stud cottages. In 1849 six Roman funeral urns were dug up in the parish. They contained burned bone fragments; one contained a Roman coin. This area was occupied by the Romans from the 1st through 4th centuries, AD.

In 1885 Kelly's Directory reported that the area's chief crops were wheat, barley, oats and turnips. In addition to the Anglican church of St. Andrew, the village had both a Wesleyan and a Primitive Methodist chapel.

Fulletby Grade II listed Anglican church, dedicated to St Andrew, is in Early English style. The church was rebuilt in 1705, but its tower fell down in 1799. It was rebuilt again in 1865. The Church is now part of the Hemingby Group of the Horncastle Deanery and seats around 120.
