= Bluestone Heath Road =

Road in England

Coordinates: 53.2694°N 0.0149°E

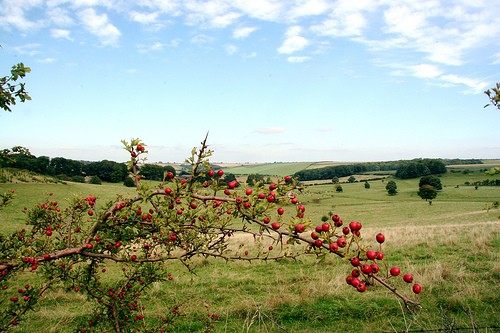
View from the Bluestone Heath Road, September 2005

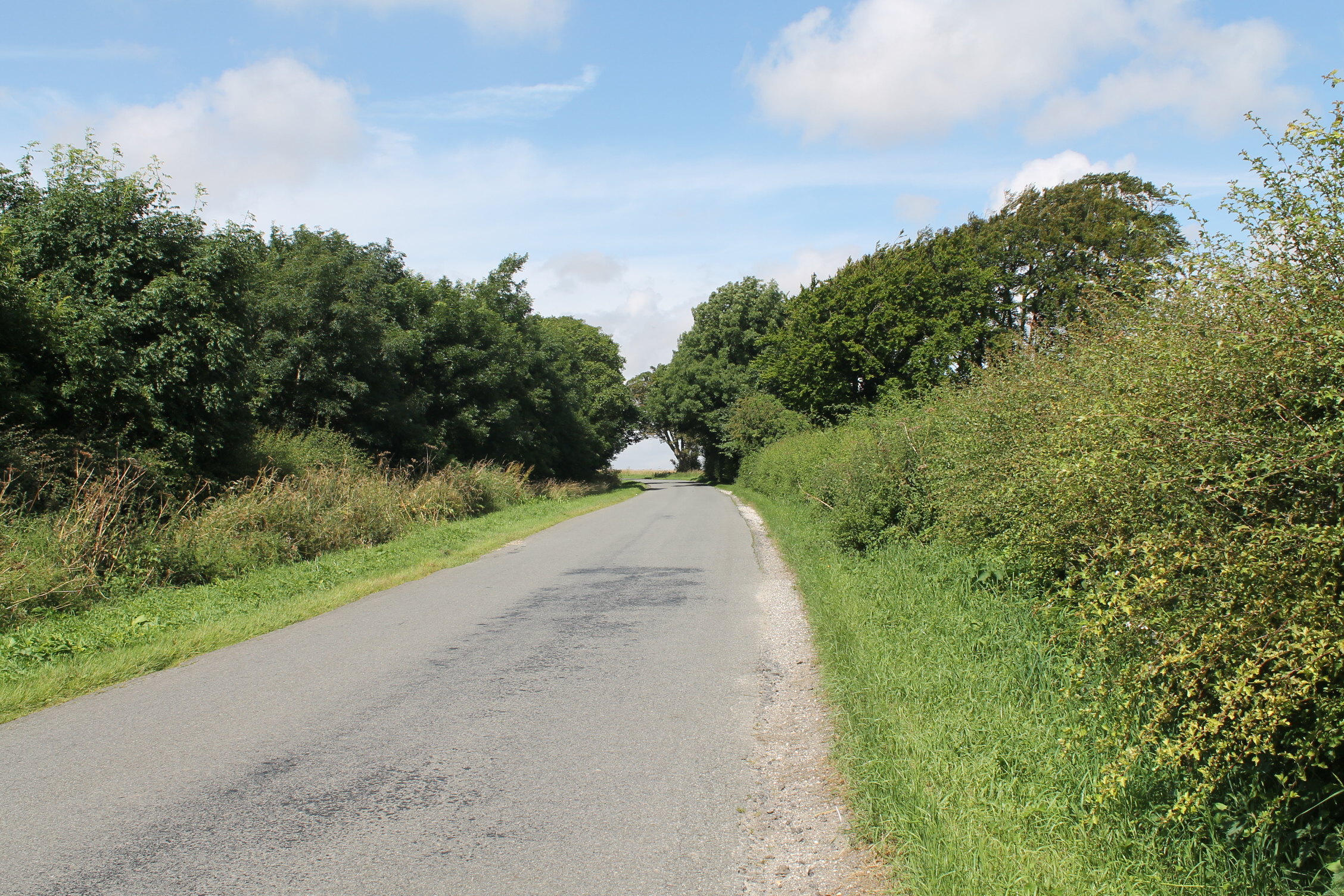
Bluestone Heath Road near Dog Hill

The Bluestone Heath Road is an ancient route and ridgeway across the Lincolnshire Wolds in Lincolnshire, England. The surviving parts are somewhat fragmented in places, but many still bear the name.

== Route ==
The route begins at Candlesby and runs 14 miles (23 km) northbound to Caistor, following closely an ancient ridge trail across the spine of the wold. It climbs to a height of 98 metres (320 feet) above sea level near Tetford, and, on a fine day, provides a view of the hamlets, fields, hills and landmarks of the area, such as Lincoln Cathedral, Boston Stump and the North Sea.

The route is marked on the Landranger No 122 (Skegness Area) Ordnance Survey map.

== History ==
The route is thought to have been developed by the earliest Celtic settlers of the region and used as a drove road for moving livestock. The primary evidence for this is the route's width compared to nearby routes and its relative distance from existing settlements of the time.

The route continued to be used by the Romano-British, sometimes closely following the original Celtic route and sometimes deviating from it. Between Ulceby and approximately Skendleby the road was straightened by the Romans and formed part of the Roman Road between Lincoln (Lindum Colonia) and the ancient coast around Wainfleet, Burgh le Marsh and Skegness. This Roman Road deviates from the Bluestone Heath Road around Ulceby but runs parallel to it about a mile to the south until it reaches the Tetford/Belchford area.

There is a disputed claim that the road was used as a munitions store during World War II due to its proximity to a number of air fields, together with a local legend that a German Doodlebug or V-2 rocket landed on Tetford Hill but never detonated.
