= Langton, Lincolnshire =

Village and civil parish in the East Lindsey district of Lincolnshire, England

Coordinates: 53.201°N 0.155°W

Langton
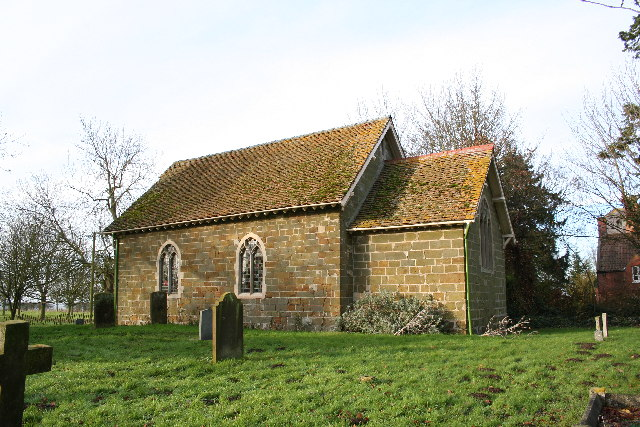
- Church of St Margaret, Langton

- Location within Lincolnshire
- OS grid reference: TF233687
  - London: 115 mi (185 km) S
- District: East Lindsey
- Shire county: Lincolnshire
- Region: East Midlands
- Country: England
- Sovereign state: United Kingdom
- Post town: Horncastle
- Postcode district: LN9
- Police: Lincolnshire
- Fire: Lincolnshire
- Ambulance: East Midlands
- UK Parliament: Louth and Horncastle

Langton is a village and civil parish in the East Lindsey district of Lincolnshire, England. It is 1.5 miles (2.4 km) west of the town of Horncastle.

The village church is a Grade II listed building dedicated to St Margaret, and is a small structure built of greenstone, limestone and red brick. The original church on the site was medieval. It was restored in 1750 and subjected to Victorian restoration in 1890 by W Scorer. Foundations of a tower can be seen on the outside of the west wall.

Langton Windmill was built of red brick in 1861, and ceased working in 1936.
