= Queen Elizabeth's Grammar School, Horncastle =

Queen Elizabeth's Grammar School

Location
- West Street; Horncastle, Lincolnshire, LN9 5AD; England; 53°12′35″N 0°07′19″W

Information
- Type: Grammar school; Academy
- Motto: Liberae Scholae De Comune Sigilum ("Free School with a Public Seal")
- Established: 1327; 1571 (received royal charter)
- Founder: Edward Clinton, 1st Earl of Lincoln
- Department for Education URN: 138665 Tables
- Ofsted: Reports
- Chair of Governors: Paul Brewster
- Head teacher: Simon Furness
- Staff: 122
- Gender: Coeducational
- Age: 11 to 18
- Enrolment: 837 pupils
- Colours: Maroon, navy and black
- School Seal: Latin: COMUNE SIGILIUM LIBERAE SCHOLAE DE... Common seal of the free school of...
- Website: http://www.qegs.lincs.sch.uk/

Queen Elizabeth's Grammar School, Horncastle, is a co-educational grammar school with academy status in Horncastle, Lincolnshire, England. In 2009, there were 877 pupils, of whom 271 were in the sixth form.

Although royally chartered by Queen Elizabeth I in 1571, there had already been a school in Horncastle for 251 years. The original charter document, with its royal seal, remains in the custody of the school's governors.

The school's catchment area includes Horncastle and the surrounding area: Wragby, Bardney and Woodhall Spa to the west, the Lincolnshire Wolds to the north and east, and Coningsby.

== History ==
=== Foundation ===
A school is known to have existed in Horncastle in 1327, but records of the present school effectively begin when Queen Elizabeth I granted the charter to establish a grammar school in Horncastle, on the petition of Edward Clinton, 1st Earl of Lincoln. The school received its seal on 25 June 1571 and the charter document is still in the possession of the present school governors.

The original school was built on a site adjoining the River Bain, close to St Mary's Parish Church. It was demolished and rebuilt after the Civil War on the same site, remaining there until the early 20th century. The first building on the current site was established in 1908, and now serves as the dining hall. The summer of 2008 was the school's 100th year on the present site and was duly marked by several centenary celebrations.

=== Coeducation and expansion ===
For much of its existence, Queen Elizabeth's was a boys-only day and boarding school. Girls were first admitted around the time the school moved to its present site. The school continued to expand, with further buildings added as enrolment increased. Queen Elizabeth's was an independent school until the Education Act of 1944 came into effect, after which the school voluntarily transferred control and finance responsibility to the local authority.

=== Change of status ===
In the autumn of 1991, the parents voted overwhelmingly for the school to become a self-governing grant maintained school. When grant maintained status was abolished by the new Labour government under the School Standards and Framework Act 1998, schools were offered a choice of returning to local authority control or opting for foundation status. Foundation status offered an environment within the education authority but with autonomous school governors controlling admissions criteria and standards for the school, directly hiring and employing the school's staff and holding ownership of the school's estate. This was the route the school selected, and Queen Elizabeth's gained a degree of independence from the local authority. In 2003, Queen Elizabeth's gained joint specialist status for science and mathematics in partnership with Banovallum School, Horncastle's secondary modern school. A second specialism for modern languages was added in 2008. The school converted to academy status in September 2012, and became independent of local authority control.

== Admissions ==
The school is made up of three parts:

- Lower School (Years 7, 8 and 9)
- Middle School (Years 10 and 11 – GCSE Years)
- Upper School (the Sixth Form – A Level Years)

Entry at age eleven is via the 11+ exam, as determined by the school's own selection procedures. Normally, the school commences four forms of pupils annually, representing the top 25% of the catchment area ability range. Continuation to the school's Sixth Form is open to all pupils for whom the school can provide a suitable course of study.

The school uniform is mandatory for all pupils. For years 7 to 11, this consists of a maroon blazer and a maroon-blue-and-white tie. In the sixth form, until the start of the 19/20 academic year, boys wore a black blazer and black-and-gold tie, while girls wore a navy blazer with a navy-and-silver tie. Since the start of the 19/20 academic year, boys and girls in the sixth form wear a navy blazer with a red-and-silver tie.

=== Catchment ===
The school's catchment area includes Horncastle and the surrounding area: Wragby, Bardney and Woodhall Spa to the west, the Lincolnshire Wolds to the north and east, and Coningsby.

=== Transport arrangements ===
A fleet of contract and services buses, organised by the education authority, provides transport for pupils in the school's catchment area, who live more than 3 miles (4.8 km) from the school. The school is also served by a variety of privately organised services, including buses, minibuses and taxis, for out-of-catchment area pupils from the Sibsey and Stickney areas to the north of Boston, as well as Lincoln and its surrounding area.

== Academics ==
A November 2011 Ofsted (Office for Standards in Education) inspection described the school as "outstanding", consistently placing above national averages in GCSE (General Certificate of Secondary Education) examinations.

The subjects taught at Queen Elizabeth's Grammar School are:

- English language
- English literature
- Maths
- Further maths
- Science (biology, chemistry and physics)
- Geography
- History
- Technology
- Music
- Art
- Drama
- Film Studies
- Computer Science
- French
- German
- Spanish
- Business studies
- Religious studies
- Geology
- Sport studies
- Product design
- Economics
- Resistant Materials
- Design and Technology
- Photography
- Finance

== Sports ==
The sports facilities at the school are:

- Athletics track
- Gymnasium including table tennis
- Sports hall
- 2 football pitches
- 5 netball courts
- 5 outdoor table tennis tables
- 2 cricket nets
- A sports pavilion with amenities
- 3 tennis courts

== Controversy ==
In 2014, the school experienced a sex scandal when it was discovered that, whilst on a school trip, two pupils under the age of consent had sexual intercourse. The event occurred when girls allegedly sneaked into the "boys only" dormitory, unbeknownst to staff as they were sleeping. The decision by the school was to suspend the staff involved with the trip, however the suspensions were later revoked. The pupils who committed the act were also suspended. Parents of the pupils who attended the trip received letters from the school.

The school was met with dismay from the parents with one explaining "I am worried about letting my children go on trips and I know some other parents feel the same." A pupil also added "It's no big secret. It [sex] has gone on on other trips."

The school's chair of governors stated that the welfare of pupils is a priority and that school trips are assessed for risks, and that the matter had been dealt with in an "appropriate and proportional way".

== Notable former pupils ==
- Colin Bailey, Chief Constable of Nottinghamshire Police (1995–2000)
- Max Boyes, Olympic athlete
- Gavin E Crooks, chemist known for his work on non-equilibrium thermodynamics and statistical mechanics, discoverer of the Crooks fluctuation theorem
- Brian Blyth Daubney (1929-2022), composer and educator
- Boothby Graffoe, Radio 4 comedian
- Mark Kent, UK Ambassador to Vietnam (2008–2010)
- Alfred Lodge (1854–1937), professor; mathematician and former head boy; President of the Mathematical Association 1897–1898; brother of physicist Oliver Lodge
- Tim Shipman, political editor at the Times and Sunday Times, 2014–2021
- Henry Simpson Lunn, founder of the Lunn Poly travel agents
- Ben Pridmore, World Memory Champion 2004, 2008 and 2009
- Abigail Tarttelin, actress, writer and novelist
- Arthur Thistlewood, conspirator in the Cato Street Conspiracy
- Algernon Ward, Archdeacon of Warwick, 1936–1945
- Robert Webb, actor and comedian, known for Peep Show and That Mitchell and Webb Look

== See also ==
- Queen Elizabeth's Grammar School, Alford
