= Roughton, Lincolnshire =

Village and civil parish in the East Lindsey district of Lincolnshire, England

Coordinates: 53.166°N 0.145°W

Roughton
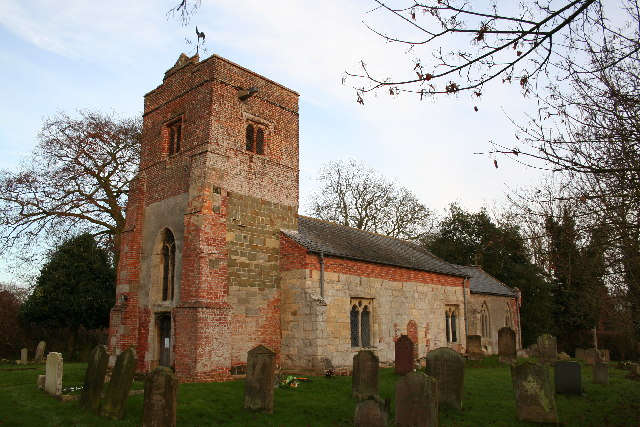
- St Margaret's Church, Roughton

- Location within Lincolnshire
- Area: 14.06 km^{2} (5.43 sq mi)
- Population: 644 (Census 2011)
  - Density: 46/km^{2} (120/sq mi)
- OS grid reference: TF241648
  - London: 105 mi (169 km) S
- District: East Lindsey
- Shire county: Lincolnshire
- Region: East Midlands
- Country: England
- Sovereign state: United Kingdom
- Post town: Woodhall Spa
- Postcode district: LN10
- Police: Lincolnshire
- Fire: Lincolnshire
- Ambulance: East Midlands
- UK Parliament: Louth and Horncastle

Roughton (/ˈruːtən/ ROOT-ən) is a village and civil parish in the East Lindsey district of Lincolnshire, England. The parish population was 644 in 2011.

The village lies approximately 5 miles (8 km) south from Horncastle and near the hamlets of Thornton and Kirkby-on-Bain. Since 1936 the hamlets of Dalderby and Martin have been part of Roughton civil parish.

In the 1086 Domesday Book, Roughton is noted with 11 households, with Lord of the manor as King William I.

The parish church dates from the 13th century, and is dedicated to Saint Margaret. Built of a "patchwork" of greenstone, limestone and red brick, its construction includes elements from 12th-century Norman to 17th-century brick. It is a Grade II* listed building. The base of a medieval stone cross is in the churchyard; it is both Grade II listed and designated as an ancient scheduled monument.

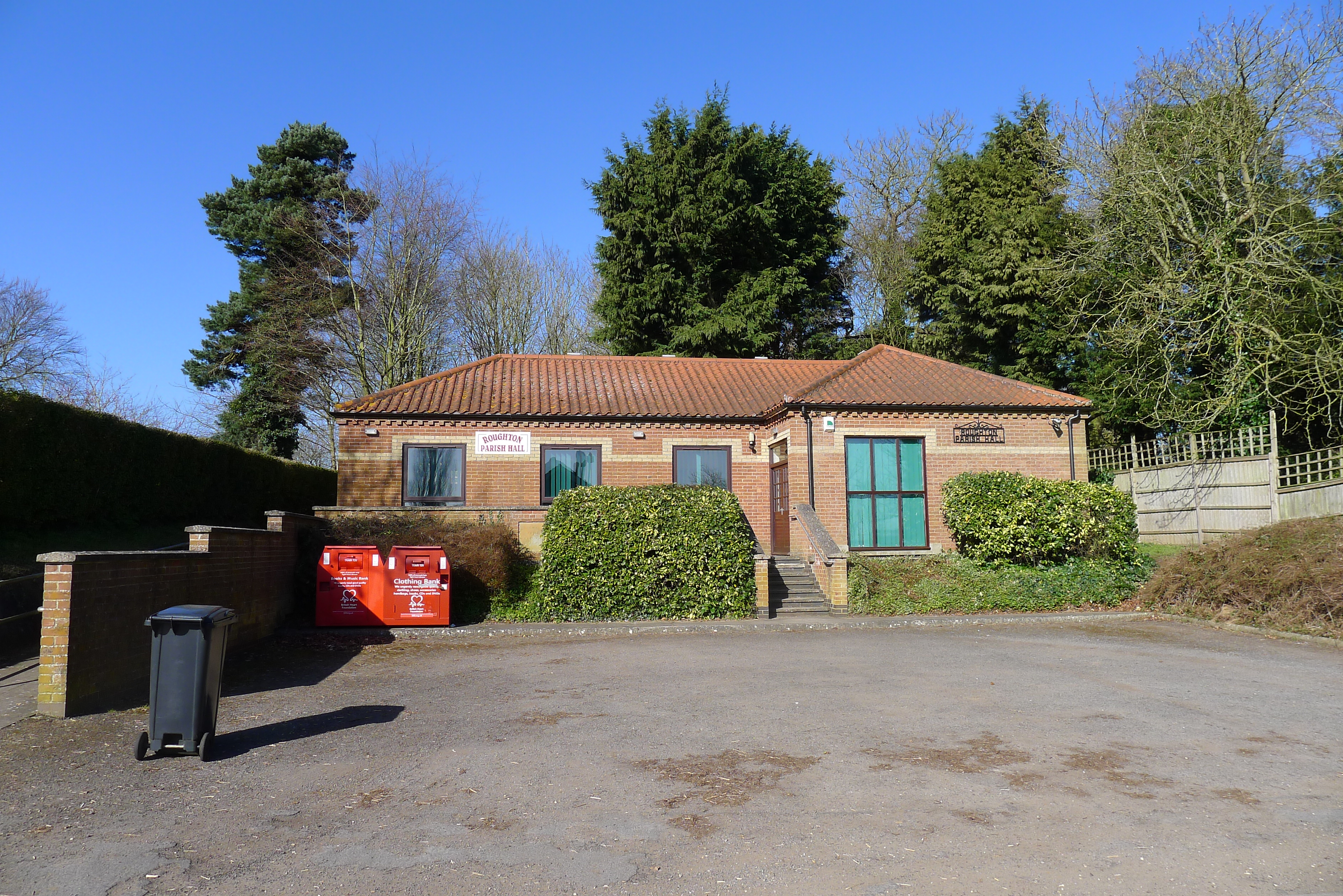
Roughton Village Hall

Roughton Hall is a Grade II* listed building dating from the mid-18th century. Until his death in 2018, it was home to Louth and Horncastle MP, and Father of the House, Sir Peter Tapsell.

A primary school in Roughton served the village and the nearby hamlets of Haltham, Dalderby and Martin. It closed in December 1946 following a decline of population.

Roughton Moor Wood on the outskirts of nearby Woodhall Spa is a conservation area consisting of semi-natural woodland; it is managed by the Lincolnshire Wildlife Trust.

== Governance ==
An electoral ward in the same name exists. This ward stretches north to Baumber with a total population taken at the 2011 census of 2,270.
