= Mareham on the Hill =

Village in Lincolnshire, England

Coordinates: 53.193537°N 0.077028°W

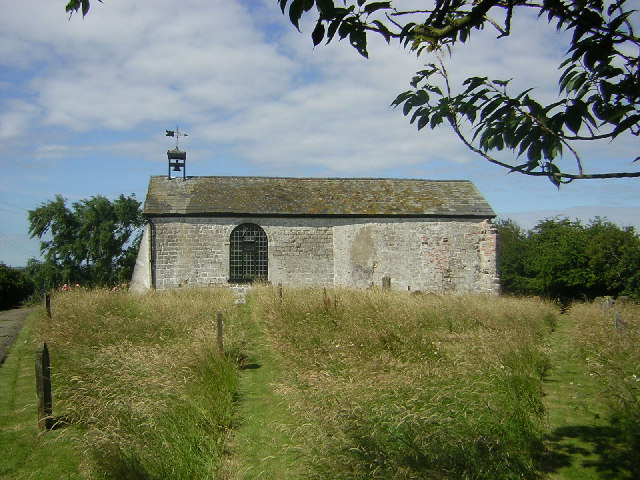
- Church of All Saints, Mareham on the Hill

- Location within Lincolnshire
- Population: 133 (2011)
- OS grid reference: TF285679
  - London: 115 mi (185 km) S
- District: East Lindsey
- Shire county: Lincolnshire
- Region: East Midlands
- Country: England
- Sovereign state: United Kingdom
- Post town: Horncastle
- Postcode district: LN9
- Police: Lincolnshire
- Fire: Lincolnshire
- Ambulance: East Midlands
- UK Parliament: Louth and Horncastle

Mareham on the Hill is a village and civil parish about 2.5 miles (4.0 km) south-east from the town of Horncastle, Lincolnshire, England.

Mareham on the Hill is listed in the 1086 Domesday Book as having one household and 8 acres (0.032 km^{2}) of woodland.

The parish church is dedicated to All Saints and is a Grade II* listed building dating from the 15th century, although it was restored in 1780 and remodelled in 1804. It is built of green sandstone, limestone and red brick, and is colourwashed.

The ecclesiastical parish is Mareham on the Hill, part of The Fen and Hill Group of the Deanery of Horncastle. The 2013 incumbent is Rev Canon Alec Boyd.

Mareham Grange farmhouse is a Grade II listed 18th-century red-brick farmhouse with 20th-century alterations.
