= Low Toynton =

Hamlet and civil parish in the East Lindsey district of Lincolnshire, England

Coordinates: 53.219465°N 0.090706°W

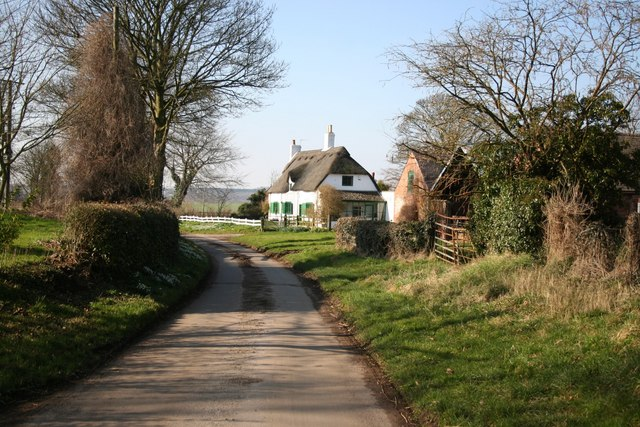
- Low Toynton

- Location within Lincolnshire
- Population: 187 (2011)
- OS grid reference: TF275708
  - London: 120 mi (190 km) S
- District: East Lindsey
- Shire county: Lincolnshire
- Region: East Midlands
- Country: England
- Sovereign state: United Kingdom
- Post town: Horncastle
- Postcode district: LN9
- Police: Lincolnshire
- Fire: Lincolnshire
- Ambulance: East Midlands
- UK Parliament: Louth and Horncastle

Low Toynton is a hamlet and civil parish in the East Lindsey district of Lincolnshire, England. The population of the civil parish (including Fulletby) was 187 at the 2011 census. It is situated about 1 mile (1.6 km) north-east from the town of Horncastle, and in the Lincolnshire Wolds, a designated Area of Outstanding Natural Beauty.

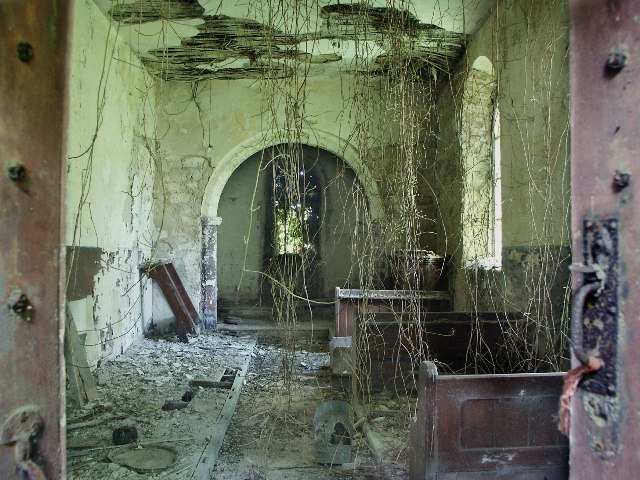
St Peter's Church

The parish church was dedicated to Saint Peter and is a Grade II* listed building and a scheduled monument. It was rebuilt of greenstone in 1811, reusing 12th-century fragments of the previous church, but fell into disuse at the end of 1959, eventually being declared redundant by the Diocese of Lincoln and sold into private ownership. It has fallen into decay and the roof is dangerous.

Low Toynton Manor Farmhouse is a Grade II listed thatched mud and stud 18th-century farmhouse.
