= LN postcode area =

Postcode area within the United Kingdom

Lincoln
- Postcode area
- Coordinates: 53.256°N 0.349°W
- Country: United Kingdom
- Postcode area: LN
- Postcode area name: Lincoln
- Post towns: 7
- Postcode districts: 13
- Postcode sectors: 49
- Postcodes (live): 9,211
- Postcodes (total): 11,935
- Statistics as at May 2020

The LN postcode area, also known as the Lincoln postcode area, is a group of thirteen postcode districts in eastern England, within seven post towns. These cover central Lincolnshire, including Lincoln, Alford, Horncastle, Louth, Mablethorpe, Market Rasen and Woodhall Spa.

Mail for the LN postcode area is processed at Sheffield Mail Centre, along with mail for the DN, S, and HU postcode areas.

== Coverage ==
The approximate coverage of the postcode districts:

| Postcode district | Post town | Coverage | Local authority area(s) |
|---|---|---|---|
| LN1 | LINCOLN | Saxilby, Ermine Estates, Stow, Sturton, City Centre | Lincoln, West Lindsey |
| LN2 | LINCOLN | Nettleham, St Giles Estates, Welton, Sudbrooke, Dunholme, Grange de Lings. | Lincoln, West Lindsey |
| LN3 | LINCOLN | Fiskerton, Cherry Willingham, Lincoln, Bardney, Reepham | Lincoln, West Lindsey, North Kesteven, |
| LN4 | LINCOLN | Branston, Canwick, Coningsby, Dunston, Heighington, Nocton, Washingborough, Timberland, Martin, Ashby de la Launde, Scopwick, Holland Fen, Metheringham | Lincoln, North Kesteven, East Lindsey, Boston |
| LN5 | LINCOLN | Waddington, Bassingham, Carlton-le-Moorland, Harmston, Haddington, Thurlby, Aubourn | Lincoln, North Kesteven |
| LN6 | LINCOLN | North Hykeham, South Hykeham, Birchwood, Skellingthorpe, Doddington, Whisby, Eagle, North Scarle, Thorpe on the Hill, Witham St Hughs, Swinderby, Norton Disney, Stapleford | Lincoln, North Kesteven |
| LN7 | MARKET RASEN | Nettleton, Caistor | West Lindsey, North Lincolnshire |
| LN8 | MARKET RASEN | Market Rasen | West Lindsey, East Lindsey, North East Lincolnshire |
| LN9 | HORNCASTLE | Horncastle, Tetford, Salmonby, Minting, Belchford, West Ashby, Hemingby, Baumber, Low Toynton, High Toynton, Fulletby, Greetham, Ashby Puerorum, Edlington, Wispington, Mareham on the Hill, Haltham, Winceby, Hameringham, Dalderby, Thornton, Langton, Old Woodhall, Oxcombe, Scrafield | East Lindsey |
| LN10 | WOODHALL SPA | Woodhall Spa, Kirkstead, Roughton, Bucknall, Horsington, Kirkby on Bain, Stixwould | East Lindsey, North Kesteven |
| LN11 | LOUTH | Louth | East Lindsey |
| LN12 | MABLETHORPE | Mablethorpe, Sutton-on-Sea, Theddlethorpe All Saints, Theddlethorpe St Helen | East Lindsey |
| LN13 | ALFORD | | East Lindsey |

== Map ==
LN postcode area map, showing postcode districts in red and post towns in grey text, with links to nearby DN, NG and PE postcode areas.

== See also ==
- Postcode Address File
- List of postcode areas in the United Kingdom
