= Horncastle =

Town in Lincolnshire, England

Coordinates: 53.208°N 0.114°W

- Town and civil parish
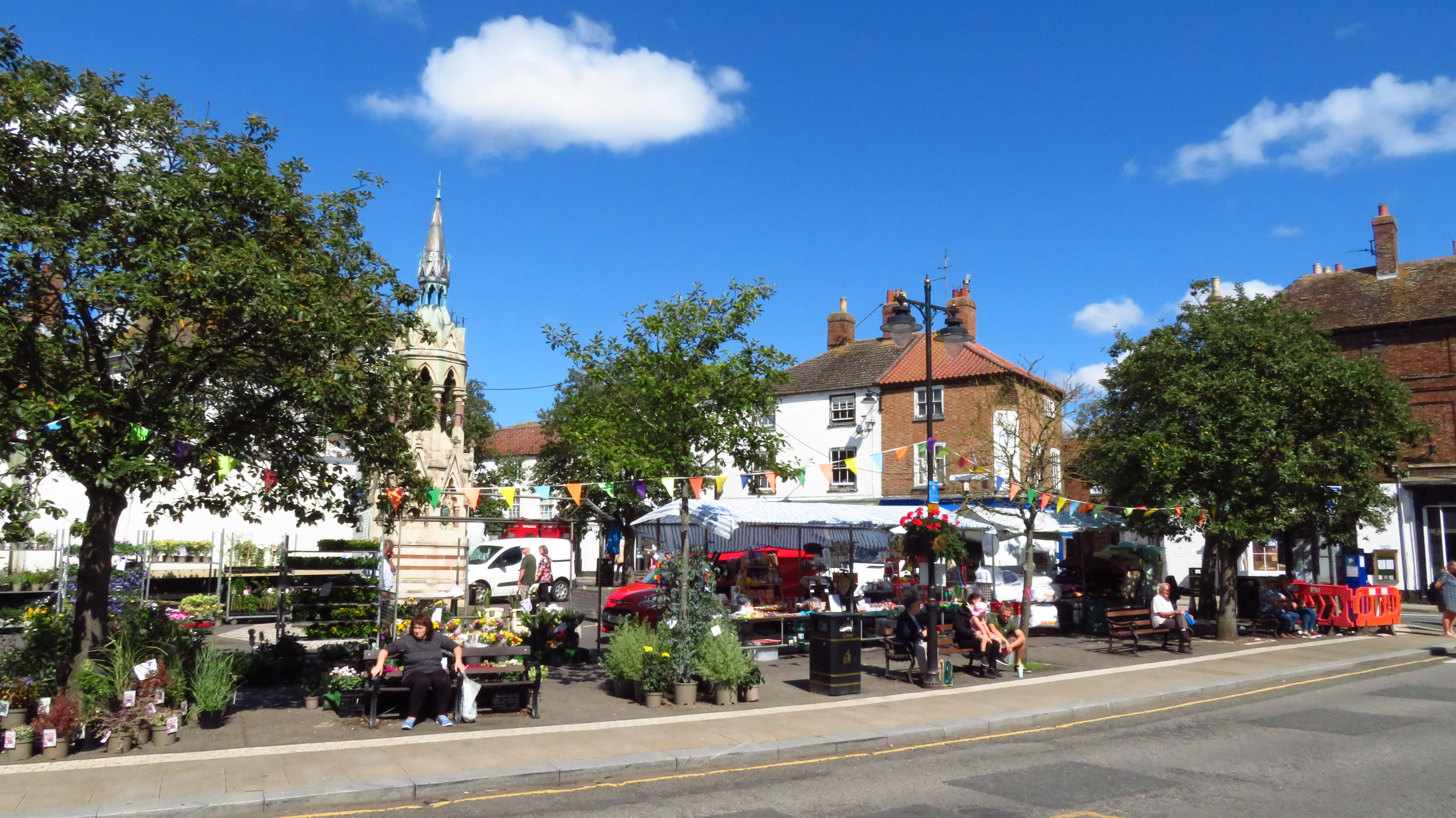
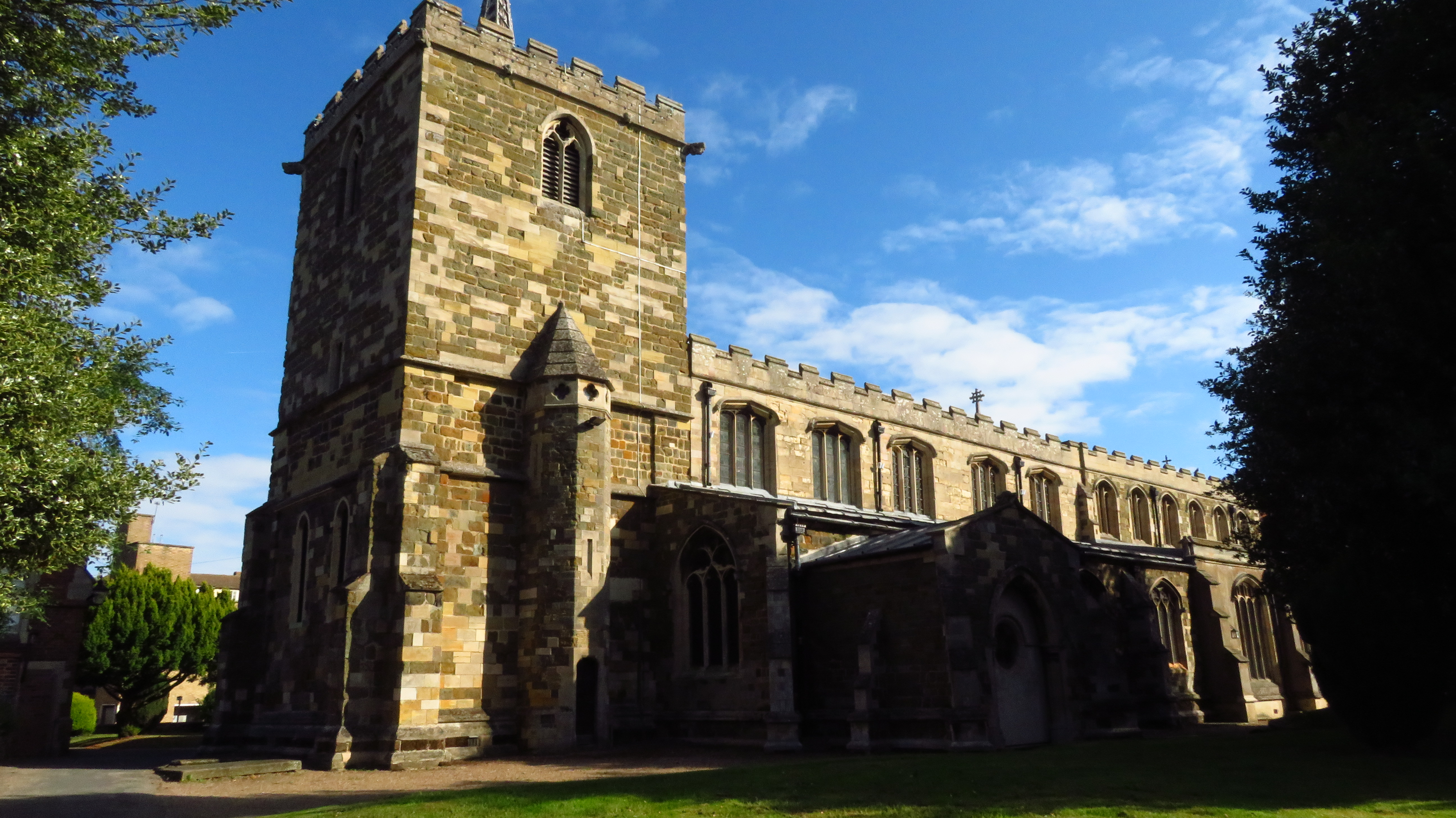
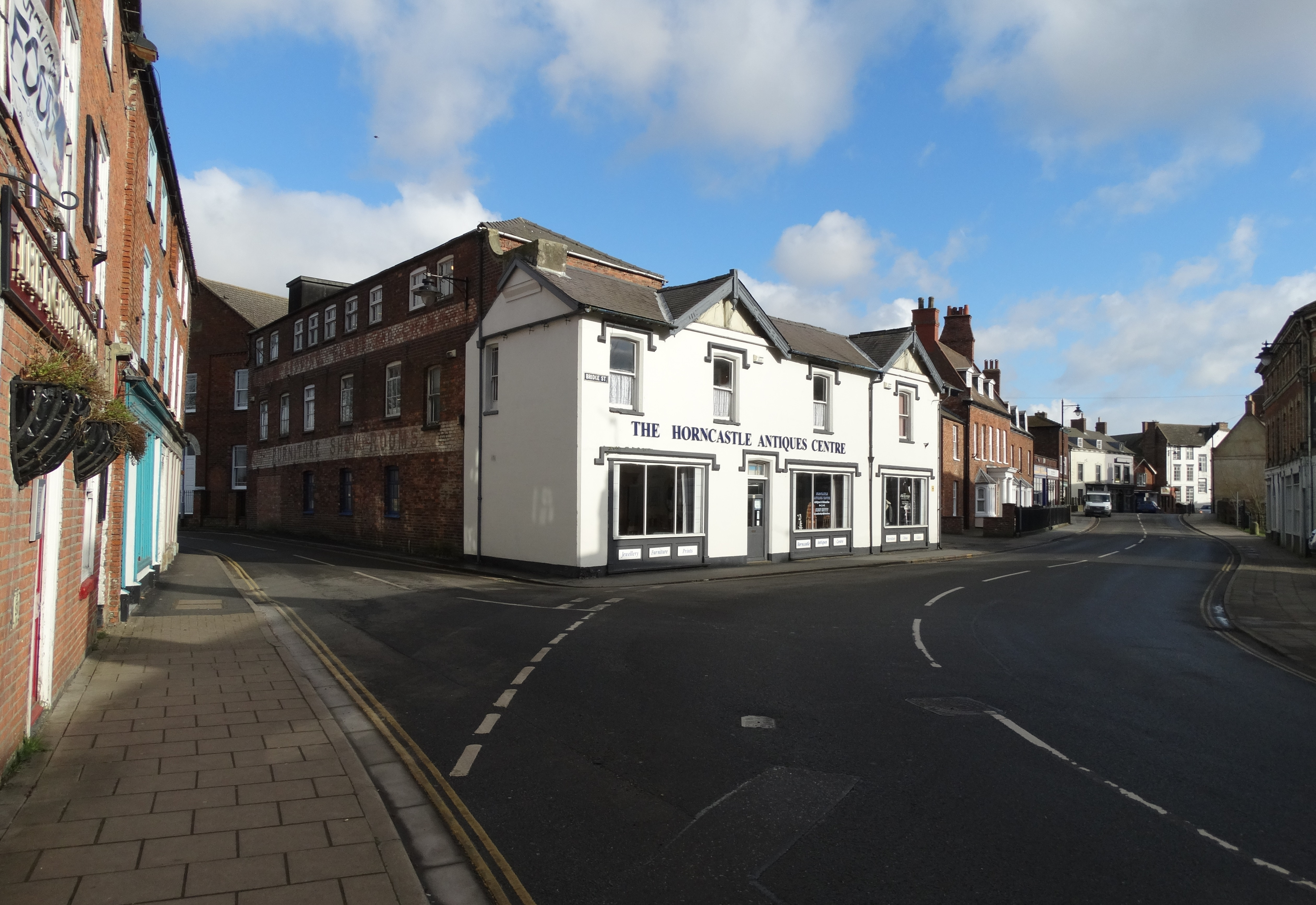
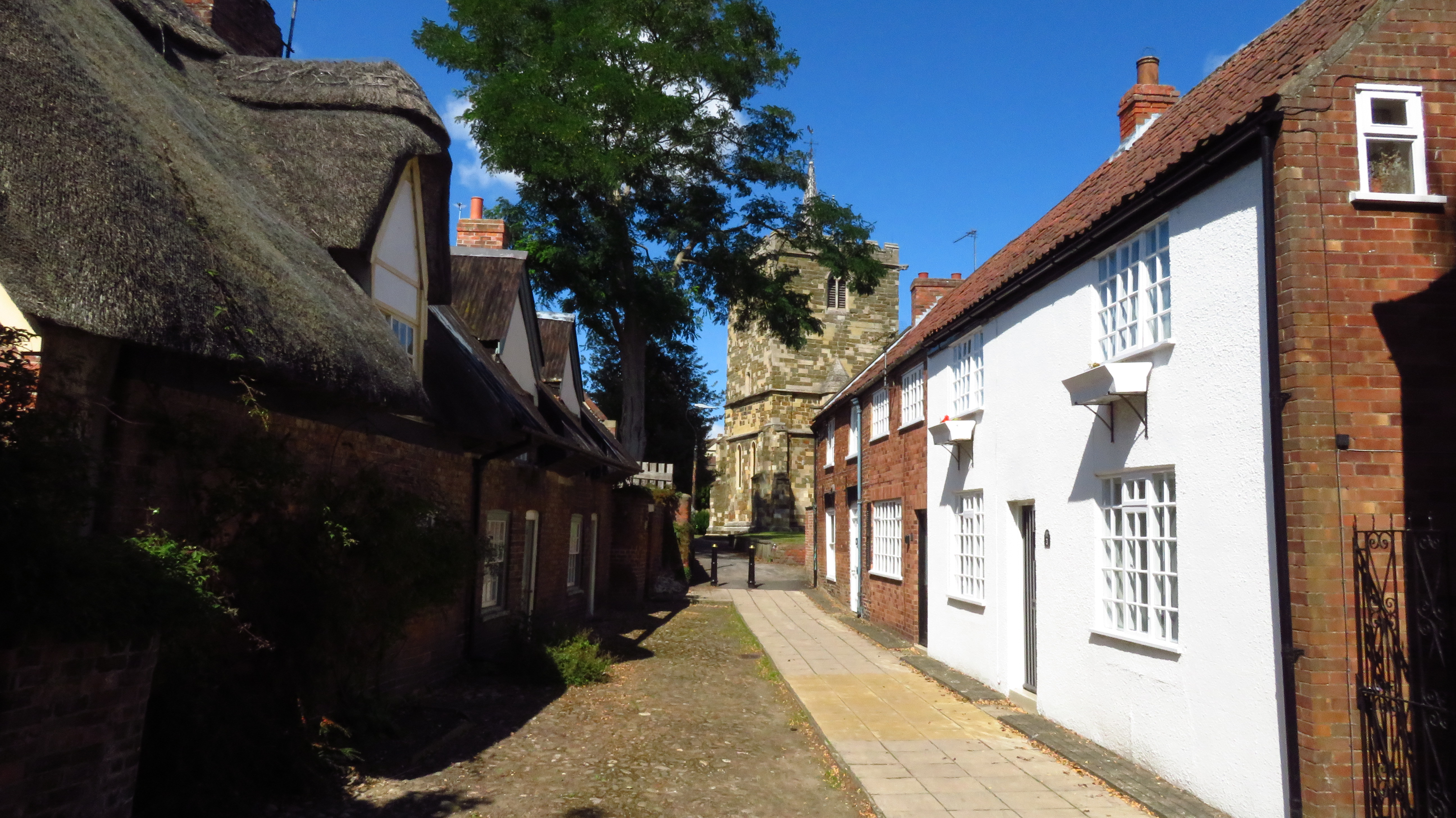
- Market Place St Mary’s Church Antiques Centre St Mary’s Square

- Location within Lincolnshire
- Area: 5.73 km^{2} (2.21 sq mi)
- Population: 7,291 (2021)
  - Density: 1,272/km^{2} (3,290/sq mi)
- OS grid reference: TF2669
  - London: 115 mi (185 km) S
- Civil parish: Horncastle
- District: East Lindsey
- Shire county: Lincolnshire
- Region: East Midlands
- Country: England
- Sovereign state: United Kingdom
- Post town: HORNCASTLE
- Postcode district: LN9
- Dialling code: 01507
- Police: Lincolnshire
- Fire: Lincolnshire
- Ambulance: East Midlands
- UK Parliament: Louth and Horncastle

Horncastle is a market town and civil parish in the East Lindsey district in Lincolnshire, England. It is 17 miles (27 km) east of Lincoln. Its population was 6,815 at the 2011 census, growing to an estimated 7,123 in 2019 and recorded as 7,291 in the 2021 census. A section of the ancient Roman walls remains.

== History ==
=== Romans ===
Although fortified, Horncastle was not on any important Roman roads, which suggests that the River Bain was the principal route of access to it.

Roman Horncastle has become known recently as Banovallum (i. e. Wall on the River Bain). Although this Roman name has been adopted by some local businesses and the town's secondary modern school, it is not firmly known to be original. Banovallum was merely suggested in the 19th century through an interpretation of the Ravenna Cosmography, a 7th-century list of Roman towns and road-stations, and may equally have meant Caistor.

The place-name ‘Horncastle’ is first attested in the Domesday Book of 1086, where it appears as ‘Hornecastre’. It appears as ‘Hornecastra’ in the Pipe Rolls of 1130. The name means “the Roman fort in the tongue of land” between the River Bain and River Waring.

The Roman walls remain in places. One section is on display in the town's library, which was built over the top of the wall. The Saxons called the town Hyrnecastre, from which its modern name derives.

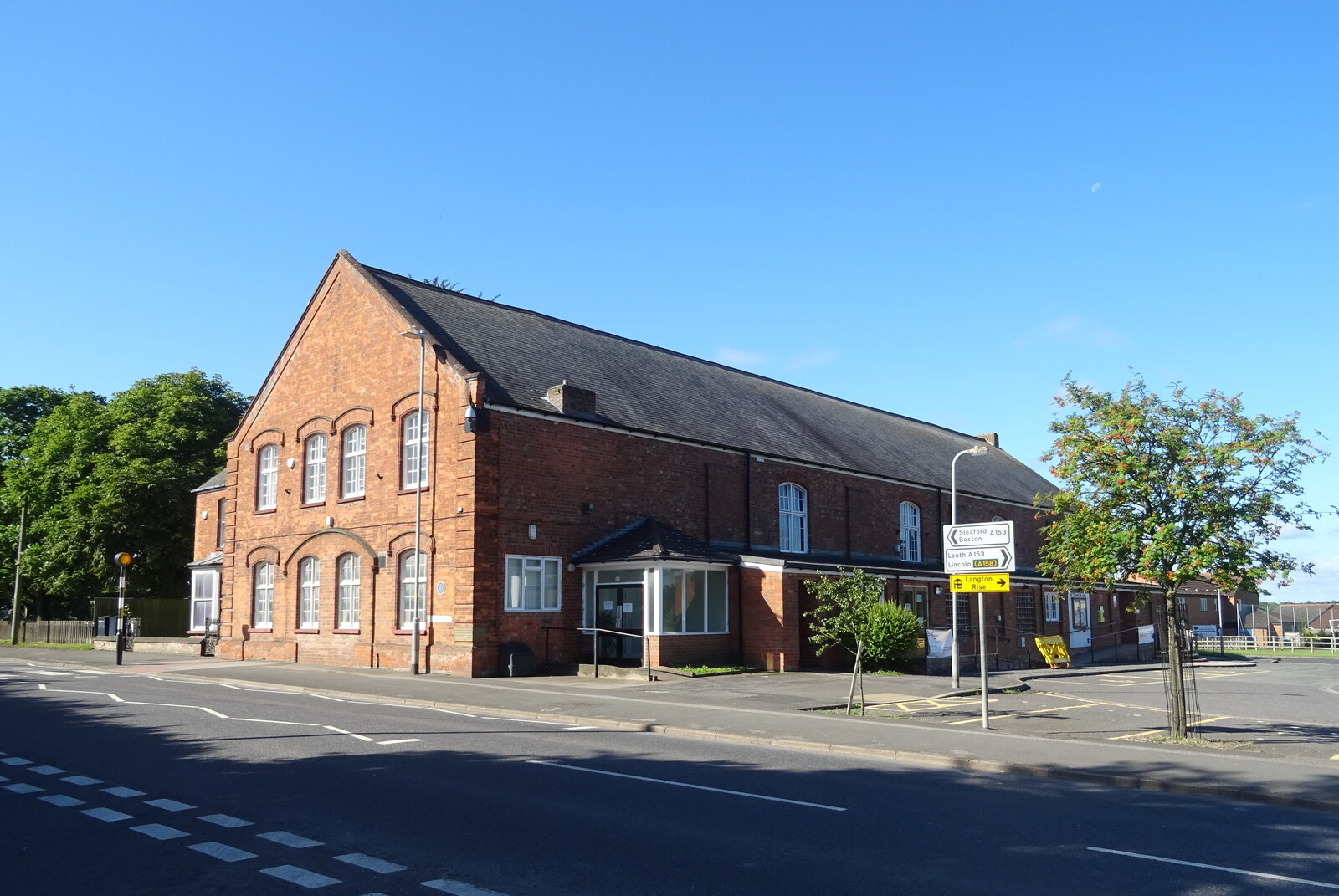
The former Horncastle Town Hall

=== Domesday Book ===
Horncastle is listed in the 1086 Domesday Book with 41 households, including 29 villagers and twelve smallholders, and had 100 acres (0 km^{2}) of meadow and two mills, all belonging to King William I.

=== Church ===
Dating from the 13th century, well before the Reformation, the Anglican parish church is dedicated to St Mary the Virgin. It is a Grade II* listed building in the Early English style, but was extensively restored 1859–1861 by Ewan Christian.

=== English Civil War ===
Four miles out is the village of Winceby, where in 1643 the Battle of Winceby helped to gain Lincolnshire for Parliament, although its leader, Oliver Cromwell, was almost killed. Local legend has it that the 13 scythe blades hanging on the wall of the south chapel of St Mary's Church were used as weapons at Winceby, but this is mainly seen as apocryphal. The historical opinion is that they probably date from the Lincolnshire Rising of 1536. Both theories on the scythes appear in the "Church History" Lincoln website.

=== Blood sports ===
Horncastle was once a centre for cockfighting and bull-baiting. The Fighting Cocks remains the name of a local pub. Bull-baiting was practised in the area known as the Bull Ring. One historian finds that the practise continued until about 1810. Both these sports were banned in England and Wales under the Cruelty to Animals Act 1835.

=== Market and horse fair ===
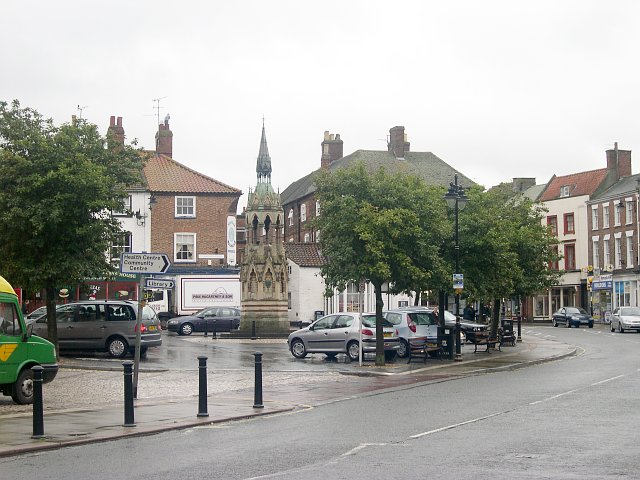
Horncastle Market Place with Stanhope Memorial

Horncastle gained a Crown market charter in the 13th century. It was long known for its great August horse fair, a famous trading event that continued until the mid-20th century. It ended after the Second World War, when horses had largely ceased to be used on farms. The town remains a centre of the antiques trade.

The annual horse fair was probably first held in the 13th century. It would last for a week or more every August. In the 19th century it was probably the largest such event in the United Kingdom. The slogan, "Horncastle for horses", was a sign of the town's standing in this trade. The fair was George Borrow's setting for some scenes in his semi-autobiographical books Lavengro and The Romany Rye. The last was held in 1948. Livestock markets continued for pigs and cattle, the last cattle market being held in 2000.

In 1894 the Stanhope Memorial, designed by E. Lingen Barker, was raised in the centre of the Market Place in memory of Edward Stanhope MP. It is a Grade II listed structure made of limestone, red sandstone and pink and grey streaked marble.

=== Notable buildings ===
The Grade II listed Old Court House in Louth Road was built in 1865. There are 116 other listed edifices in the town, including the three places of worship – St Mary's (Grade II*), Holy Trinity (Grade II) and the Congregational Church (Grade II) – and several sections of the Roman walls (Grade I). The former Horncastle Town Hall was built as a drill hall and completed in around 1903.

The Sir Joseph Banks Centre commemorates the botanist who sailed with Captain Cook on HMS Endeavour. Banks, who lived at nearby Revesby Abbey, contributed to botanical science, with around 80 plant species bearing his name, and helped establish Kew Gardens as a leading institution.

== Population ==
Historically, the civil parish lost population from the mid-19th to mid-20th centuries, as urbanisation and agricultural changes drew people to cities, where more work was available. However, the population since the late 20th century it has risen, to 6,815 in 2011, its highest so far. The estimated population in 2019 was still higher at 7,123.

Population of Horncastle civil parish
Year	1801	1811	1821	1831	1841	1851	1881	1891	1901	1911	1921	1931	1951	1961	2011
Population	2,015	2,602	3,058	3,988	4,521	5,017	4,818	4,374	4,038	3,900	3,459	3,496	3,809	3,771	6,815

== Geography ==
Horncastle lies 7 miles from Woodhall Spa, 18 miles from Boston, 21 miles from Lincoln and 13 miles from Louth. It is near the main A158 road between Lincoln to Skegness, to the south of the Lincolnshire Wolds, where the north–south River Bain meets the River Waring from the east, and north of the West and Wildmore Fens. The south of Horncastle is called Cagthorpe. Langton Hill to the west was part of Horncastle Rural District in the Parts of Lindsey, but is now in the district of East Lindsey, based in Manby.

North of Horncastle are the villages of West Ashby and Low Toynton, and to their south Milestone House and Mareham on the Hill on the eastern outskirts. The Viking Way meets the River Waring, then north of the A158 the village of High Toynton. The A153 skirts the southern edge of the River Bain to reach Roughton and Thornton. The border follows the Old River Bain west of the A153 and north over the river meadows, crossing the Horncastle Canal and Viking Way. Eastwards it crosses the B1191 to the village of Langton and northwards to Thimbleby. It meets the B1190, then the A158 at the B1190 junction, following Accommodation Road to the east and skirting the north of the town along Elmhurst Road, past Elmhurst Lakes, to reach West Ashby at the River Bain near Hemingby Lane.

== Demographics ==
At the 2021 census, Horncastle's built up area had a population of 7,291. Of the findings, the ethnicity and religious composition of the ward was:

Horncastle: Ethnicity: 2021 Census
Ethnic group	Population	%
White	7,142	97.8%
Asian or Asian British	74	1%
Mixed	65	0.9%
Black or Black British	10	0.2%
Other Ethnic Group	10	0.2%
Arab	1	0.1%
Total	7,291	100%

The religious composition of the ward at the 2021 Census was recorded as:

Horncastle: Religion: 2021 Census
Religious	Population	%
Christian	3,741	55.1%
Irreligious	2,957	43.5%
Other religion	40	0.6%
Muslim	35	0.5%
Buddhist	8	0.2%
Hindu	6	0.2%
Sikh	4	0.1%
Jewish	1	0.1%
Total	7,291	100%

== Economy ==
Lincolnshire Integrated Voluntary Emergency Service is based at the Boston Road Industrial Estate. The Lincolnshire Wildlife Trust is based in Banovallum House. Mortons of Horncastle is a major national magazine publisher of classic motorcycles, aviation and road transport heritage titles, based in the industrial estate off the A153 (Boston Road).

== Governance ==
An electoral ward of the same name exists. It includes Thimbleby and had a total population at the 2011 Census of 7,073.

== Politics ==
Horncastle has always been a safe area for the Conservative Party, except for two years in the early 1920s, when it had Liberal Party representation. It had an eponymous parliamentary constituency for 98 years, from 1885 to 1983. It then became Gainsborough and Horncastle, and after 1997 Louth and Horncastle. Henry Haslam served as MP in the Second World War and the five years of the Churchill wartime government. The veteran politician Sir Peter Tapsell was MP for the town in 1966–1983 and 1997–2015, being Father of the House of Commons from 2010 to 2015. After a redistribution of parliamentary constituencies, Edward Leigh was MP from 1983–1997. In 2024 Victoria Atkins was re-elected as the Conservative MP for Louth and Horncastle.

== Education ==
=== Primary schooling ===
Horncastle Primary School stands in Bowl Alley Lane.

=== Secondary schooling ===
Queen Elizabeth's Grammar School was founded in 1571, and is among the top schools in Lincolnshire, having been at times among the top schools in the country. Its tennis, hockey, netball and cricket teams compete regionally, and the tennis team was a regional winner in the 2005 British Schools Tennis Championships. Queen Elizabeth's is a specialist Science College and Language College. Its Design and Technology department recently entered two teams in the National 4X4 for Schools engineering competition, one of which came first nationally in its age group, while the other came second nationally overall.

The Banovallum School is a non-selective community school serving Horncastle and surrounding villages; it forms a science specialist school jointly with Queen Elizabeth's Grammar School. The most recent Ofsted inspection in 2019 judged the school to be overall Grade 2 (good). It had a building added in 2010, with facilities for cookery, woodwork, metalwork, art and music.

St Lawrence School is a special-needs school with a county-wide intake. It comprises the Lincolnshire Wolds Federation with St Bernard's School, Louth.

=== Colleges ===
Horncastle College was a "lifelong-learning" adult education college that ran short and residential courses in I.T., art, languages and local history. It has been replaced by Fortuna Horncastle Business Centre.

== Transport ==
=== Roads ===
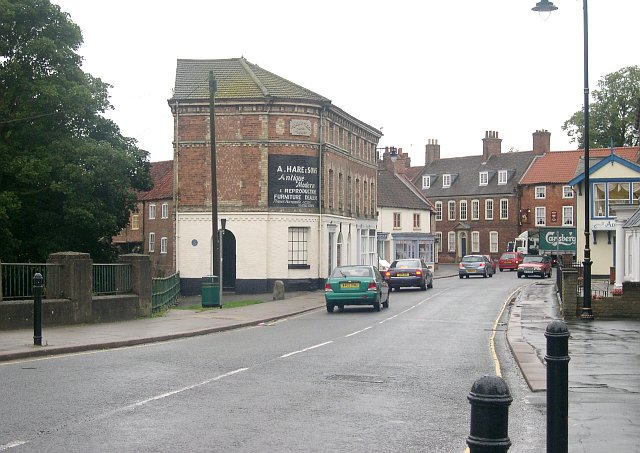
Bridge Street

Horncastle sits at the crossroads of two major Lincolnshire roads: the east–west A158, joining the county town of Lincoln with the resort of Skegness on the Lincolnshire coast, and the north–south A153 joining Louth with Sleaford and Grantham in the south. These meet at the Bull Ring in central Horncastle.

The A158 through Horncastle becomes busy in the summer holidays with Skegness holidaymakers. To alleviate traffic pressure in the town centre a relief road, Jubilee Way, was built in the 1970s. Minor roads run from Horncastle to Bardney, Boston (via Revesby), Fulletby and Woodhall Spa.

Horncastle is a hub for the InterConnect rural bus service. Regular services run to Lincoln, Skegness and across the Wolds. The Viking Way long-distance footpath passes through the town.

=== Railway ===
The Great Northern Railway's Lincoln–Boston line ran through Kirkstead, 8 miles (12.9 km) from Horncastle, and a branch line from Kirkstead (later Woodhall Junction) through Woodhall Spa to Horncastle opened on 11 August 1855. The last passenger service ran in 1954, with complete closure to goods traffic in 1971. Horncastle railway station was demolished in the 1980s and replaced by housing. The nearest railway station now is Metheringham (15 miles, 24 km) on the Peterborough to Lincoln Line. Part of the old railway is followed by the Viking Way footpath.

=== Waterways ===
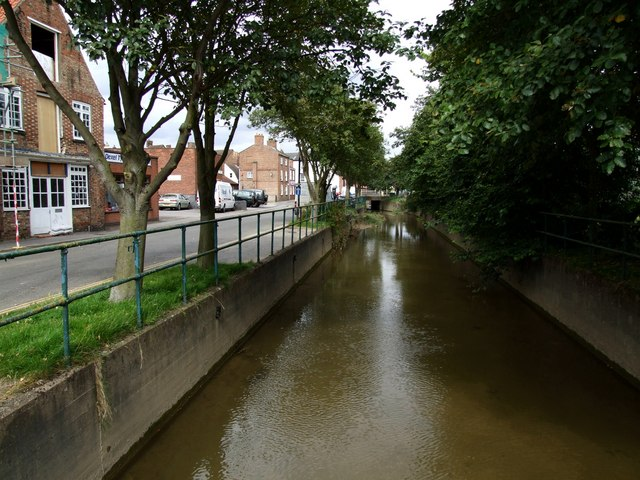
South Basin of the Horncastle Canal, Horncastle

Horncastle Canal, based on the River Bain, was begun in 1792 and opened in 1802.
In 2004 it was suggested that the canal be renovated with the help of private capital and promoted as a route for pleasure craft, as has been done successfully in other areas. A local kick-start programme raised money for the project.

== Media ==
Local news and television programmes are provided by BBC Yorkshire and Lincolnshire and ITV Yorkshire. Television signals are received from the Belmont TV transmitter. BBC East Midlands and ITV Central can also be received from the Waltham TV transmitter.

Local radio stations are BBC Radio Lincolnshire on 94.9 FM, Greatest Hits Radio Lincolnshire on 102.2 FM, Hits Radio Lincolnshire, which broadcasts on DAB and County Linx Radio that broadcast online.

The Horncastle News is the town’s weekly local newspaper.

== Sport ==
=== Field games ===
Horncastle Town F.C., founded in 1873, is an amateur club based at The Wong. It joined the Lincolnshire Football League in the 1996/1997 season. In the 1886–87 FA Cup, the club reached the last 16.

The town's cricket club at Coronation Walk has two men's and five youth teams.

Horncastle Hockey Club is a voluntary field-hockey body set up in November 1970 at Coronation Walk, Horncastle. In 2020 it had two men's and two women's teams and a junior section.

=== Court games ===
Horncastle and District Tennis Club has served for over 70 years. Initially on grass courts in Stanhope Road, the club moved to the current Coronation Walk location in the 1970s.

Horncastle Community Members Squash Club in Hemmingby Lane was founded in November 2006 to preserve an existing club by buying out retiring owners who had run it for 25 years.

== Floods ==
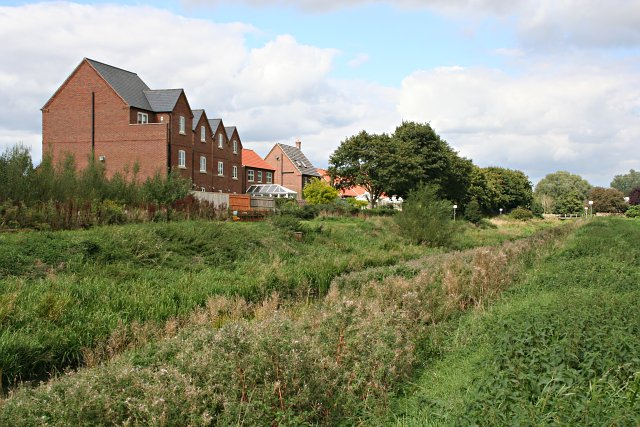
New housing by the River Bain

The town has been susceptible to flooding, notably in 1920 and 1960, and with three floods between 1981 and 1984.

Folk belief associates the occurrence of floods with installations of new vicars in Horncastle's Anglican Church. The vicar changed in 1919 and 1959, both less than a year before a flood. The flooding of the early 1980s was attributed to the change of vicar in 1980, but there was no flooding after the change of vicar in 1999. The River Bain and River Waring overflowed during the 2007 United Kingdom floods.

Flooding recurred in 2012. A £15 million, 30-year-old proposed flood-defence scheme was seen as unlikely to have prevented the 2012 flood, but new flood defences are being discussed. An anti-flood pump was installed in 2013.

On 7 October 1960 Horncastle entered the UK Weather Records with a "highest 180-minute total" rainfall of 178 mm. Water levels are said to have risen 8 feet (2.4 m) as a consequence.

Real-time river levels are available from the Environment Agency:

- River Bain at Horncastle Victoria Mill
- River Waring at Horncastle's Banks Road

Flood warnings for the town:

- Watermill Road, Bridge Street, St. Lawrence Street, Prospect Street and West Street areas
- Stanhope Road, Banks Road, East Street, North Street, Wharf Road and Waring Street areas

== Twin town ==
Horncastle is twinned with Bonnétable, a ville de marché (market town) in the French department of Sarthe, with a population of about 4,000. The towns' relationship is commemorated by a Rue Horncastle in Bonnétable and a Bonnetable Road in Horncastle (without the acute accent).

== Tourism ==
=== Walking Tours ===
Horncastle offers several self-guided walking routes that highlight the town's Roman origins and Georgian architecture. The "Horncastle Town Trail" guides visitors through narrow alleyways and past former coaching inns, with blue plaques marking significant historical sites including the Roman wall fragments and the 19th-century grammar school.

=== Outdoor Activities ===
The River Bain, England's shortest river, provides opportunities for kayaking and wild swimming at designated access points north of the town. Horncastle serves as the southern gateway to the Viking Way long-distance footpath, with the first section leading walkers through the gentle hills and ancient woodlands that inspired Tennyson's early nature poetry. Nearby Snipe Dales Nature Reserve, just 5 km southwest of the town center, offers rare wet valley habitats supporting over 60 bird species, including the increasingly uncommon willow tit and yellowhammer.

== Notable people ==
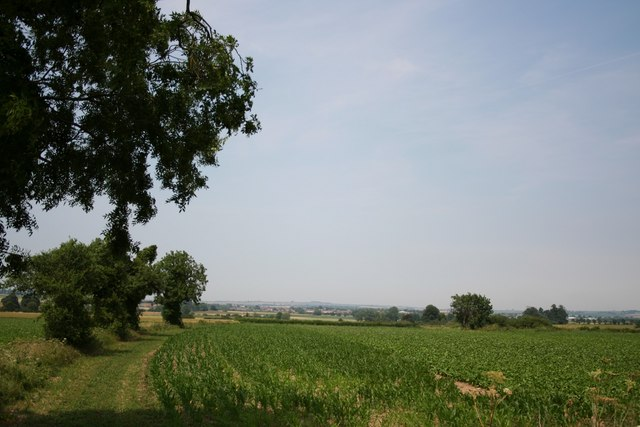
View northwards towards the town from Dalderby

- Rev. William Blaxton (also William Blackstone) (1595 – 26 May 1675) was an early English settler in New England and the first European settler of modern-day Boston and Rhode Island.
- Sir Joseph Banks (1743–1820) was botanist to Captain James Cook.
- Alec Brader (1942–2024), professional footballer, schoolteacher and youth athletics coach
- Annie Dixon (1817–1901), miniature portrait painter
- Sir Lionel Dymoke (died 1519)
- Robert Merrick Fowler (1778–1860), a Royal Navy officer, served with Matthew Flinders and at the Battle of Pulo Aura (1804).
- Tim Garbutt, DJ/producer and one half of the dance music act Utah Saints
- Richard Hill (1795 - 1872), lawyer and campaigner for the rights of people of colour in Jamaica
- Connie Lewcock (1894–1980), suffragette
- Henry Simpson Lunn (1859–1939), religious leader and co-founder of Lunn Poly travel agents
- William Marwood (1818–1883), public hangman
- Erasmus Middleton (1739–1805), clergyman, author and editor
- Ben Pridmore (born 1976), memory champion, attended school in Horncastle.
- Samuel Roberts (1827–1913), mathematician and Fellow of the Royal Society
- Thomas Sully (1783–1872), portrait painter
- Emily Tennyson, Lady Tennyson (1813–1896)
- Alfred, Lord Tennyson (1809–1892), Poet Laureate, was born six miles from Horncastle in the village of Somersby. Tennyson opined, "Of all horrors, a little country town seems to me to be the greatest."
- Arthur Thistlewood (1774–1820), radical and Cato Street conspirator, was baptised in Horncastle on 4 December 1774.
- Robert Webb (born 1972), actor and comedian, lived in Woodhall Spa, but went to school in Horncastle.
- Harold A. Wilson (1885–1932), 1908 Olympic athlete, was the first to run an under four-minute 1500 metres.
