= List of public art in Lincolnshire =

This is a list of public art in the Lincolnshire county of England. This list applies only to works of public art on permanent display in an outdoor public space. For example, this does not include artworks in museums.

The list can be sorted by clicking on the corresponding arrows in the column titles.

Image	Title / subject	Location and coordinates	Date	Artist / designer	Type	Material	Dimensions	Designation	Owner / administrator	Notes
More images	The Monument	Somerby 53°32′48.055″N 0°24′3.748″W	1770		Monument	Ashlar		Grade II		An urn on a Doric column, marking 29 years of happy marriage of Edward Weston and his wife Ann, of Somerby Hall.
	Holgate Monument	Brocklesby Hall, Brocklesby 53°35′04.78″N 0°16′49.04″W	1785	James Wyatt	Monument	Coade stone		Grade I		Erected by the 1st Baron Yarborough in memory of his friend George Holgate of Melton.
	Wellington Monument	Woodhall Spa 53°10′14.545″N 0°12′27.468″W	1844		Monument	Granite	36 feet (11 m) high	Grade II		An obelisk surmounted by a bust of the Duke of Wellington.
More images	Handley Memorial	Sleaford 52°59′47.94″N 0°24′31.78″W	1850	Boyle	Monument			Grade II		Monument to Henry Handley, born in Sleaford, in the style of an Eleanor cross.
More images	John Franklin	The Terrace, Spilsby 53.17383°N 0.09525°E	1861	Charles Bacon and W. J. Rogers	Statue	Bronze, Portland stone and ashlar		Grade II		Born in Spilsby, discoverer of the Northwest Passage.
	Herbert Ingram	Market Place, Boston 52°58′42.283″N 0°1′27.534″W	1862	Alexander Munro	Statue	Stone		Grade II		Politician born in Boston, founder of The Illustrated London News
	Albert, Prince Consort	In front of Dock Offices, Grimsby 53°34′31.537″N 0°4′31.879″W	1879	William Theed	Statue	Bronze and polished granite		Grade II		Prince Albert laid the foundation stone of the Royal Dock in 1849.
	Dr Edward Parker Charlesworth	The Lawn, corner of Union Road and Carline Road, Lincoln 53.23431°N 0.543345°W	1889	Thomas Milnes	Statue	Marble and ashlar		Grade II		
	Monument to horse	Brocklesby Park, Brocklesby 53°35′11.472″N 0°17′2.486″W	1891		Monument	Ashlar		Grade II		Inscription: "Under this urn lies DASHAWAY, a favourite hunter aged 21 years 1891."
More images	Alfred Lord Tennyson	Minster Green, Lincoln 53°14′06.24″N 0°32′07.08″W	1905	George Frederic Watts	Statue	Bronze and ashlar		Grade II		
More images	RAF North Coates Strike Wing War Memorial	Pier Gardens, Cleethorpes 53°33′29.73″N 0°01′30.98″W	1999	Pam Taylor	Statue	Bronze and stone	Statue height 1.80 metres (5 ft 11 in), plinth height 2.50 metres (8 ft 2 in)			Commemorating the members of North Coates Strike Wing who served in World War II.
	Lincoln Longwool Sheep	Water Rail Way, Stixwould 53°09′23″N 0°15′15″W		Sally Matthews	Sculpture	Welded scraps of iron				Three sculptures of Lincoln Longwool sheep.
	Lincoln Red Cattle	Water Rail Way, Washingborough 53°13′52″N 0°25′50″W		Sally Matthews	Sculpture	Welded scraps of iron				Two sculptures of Lincoln Red cattle.
	Meridian: Searching	Westgate, Louth 53.36704°N 0.00844°W	2000–2002	Les Bicknell and Lawrence Edwards	Sculpture	Bronze and stainless steel	1.7 metres (5 ft 7 in) high			Part of the millennium public art project "Meridian".
More images	Empowerment	Waterside, Lincoln 53.22843°N 0.53898°W	2002	Stephen Broadbent	Sculpture	Alunimiun and steel	16 metres (52 ft) high			Funded by Lincoln businesses, it is inspired by turbine blades.
More images	Fishermen's Memorial	St James Square, Grimsby 53.56440°N 0.08940°W	2005	Trevor Harries	Sculpture	Bronze	3 metres (9.8 ft) high			"In memory of the fishermen of Grimsby who sailed to distant waters never to return" – part of the inscription.
More images	Eleanor Cross Monument	Sheep Market, Stamford 52.65150°N 0.48095°W	2009	Wolfgang Buttress	Sculpture	Ketton stone and bronze			Lincolnshire County Council	An Eleanor cross once stood in Stamford, of which only a stone rose survives; this monument has a rose motif.
More images	The Arrival	Thorney Road, Crowland 52°40′28.5″N 0°09′57″W	2015	Richard James	Sculpture	Steel and bronze				It depicts the Guthlac Roll, which pictorially tells the story of Saint Guthlac of Crowland.
More images	Scunthorpe Steelworkers	High Street, Scunthorpe 53.59228°N 0.64513°W	2018	Ray Lonsdale	Statue	Corten steel				Depiction of a man and a woman returning home after a shift in the steelworks.
More images	Margaret Thatcher	St Peter's Hill Green, Grantham 52°54′36.7″N 0°38′25.8″W	2022	Douglas Jennings	Statue	Bronze				
	George Boole	Lincoln railway station, Lincoln 53.22645°N 0.53926°W	2022	Antony Dufort	Sculpture					Commissioned by the Heslam Trust. Boole, born in Lincoln, is shown as a teacher with two pupils.
	On Freedom's Wings	Norton Disney	2025		Sculpture	Steel	26m long and with a 31m wingspan		Bomber County Gateway Trust	A life-size model of a Lancaster bomber
