= Lincolnshire =

County of England

- Non-metropolitan and ceremonial county
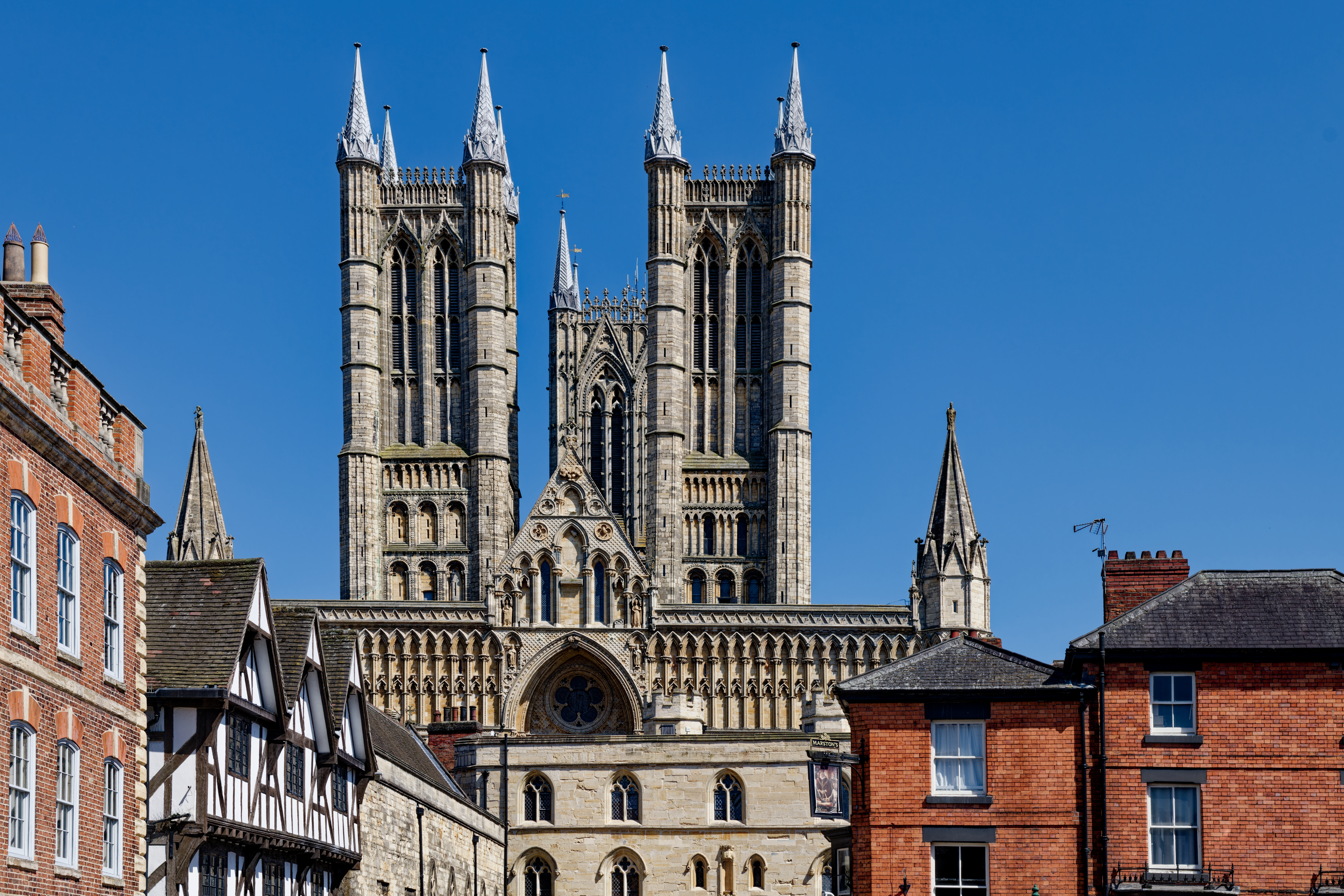
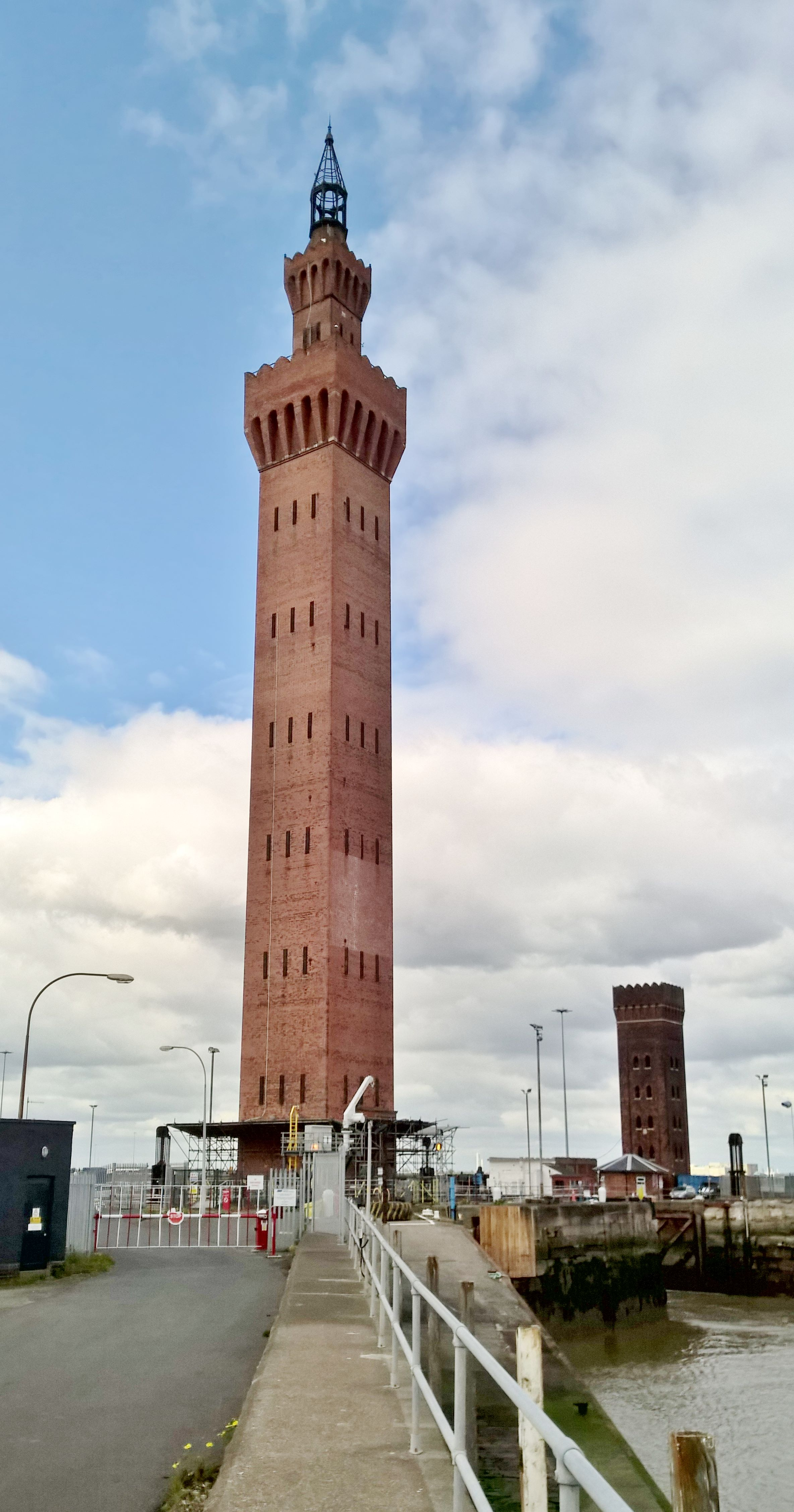
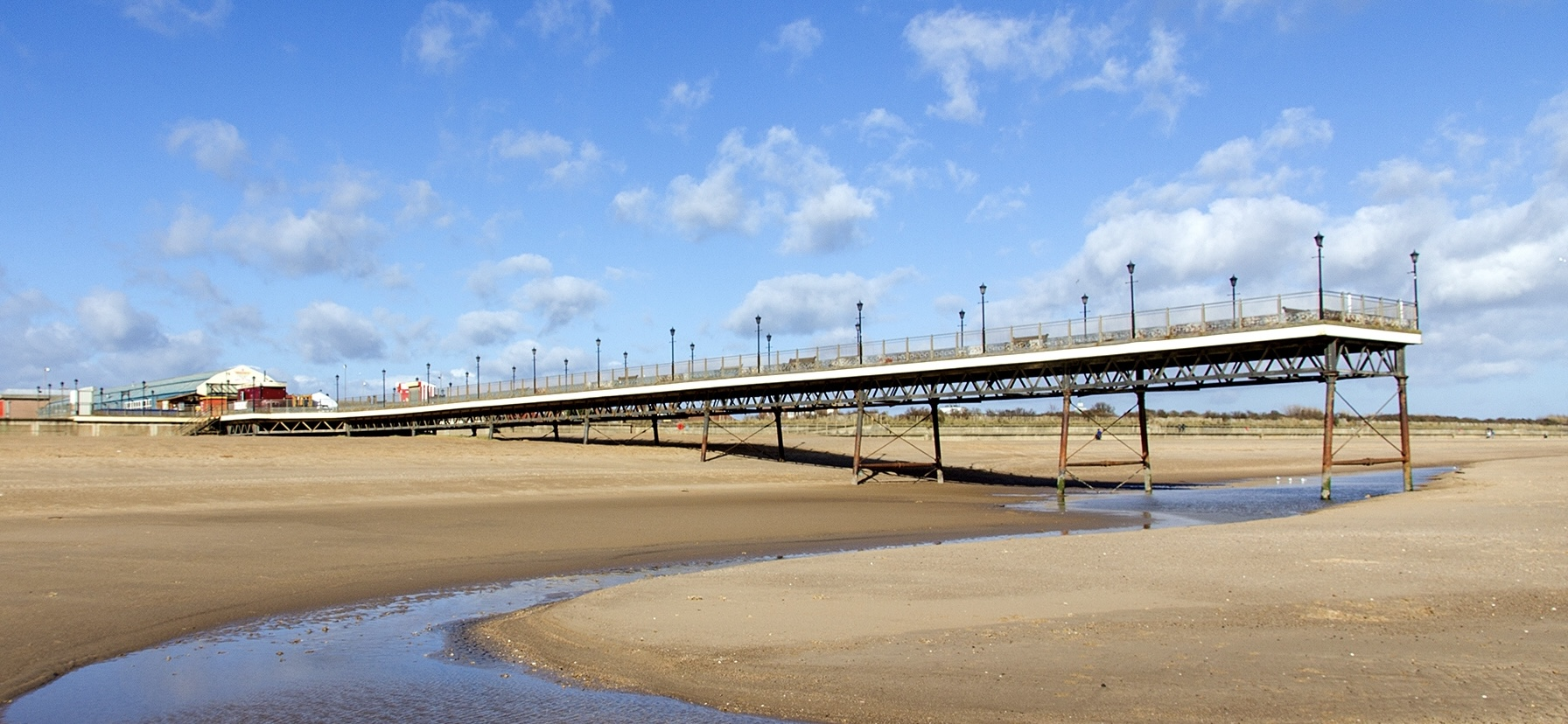
- Lincoln Cathedral; Grimsby Dock Tower; Skegness Pier

- Lincolnshire within England
- Coordinates: 53.1°N 0.2°W
- Sovereign state: United Kingdom
- Constituent country: England
- Region: Divided between East Midlands & Yorkshire and the Humber
- Established: April 1996
- Established by: 1990s local government reform
- Preceded by: Humberside (North East Lincolnshire & North Lincolnshire) & Lincolnshire (Lincolnshire County Council)
- Origin: Parts of Lincolnshire (Grimsby County Borough, Holland, Kesteven, Lincoln County Borough & Lindsey)
- Time zone: UTC+0 (GMT)
  - Summer (DST): UTC+1 (BST)
- UK Parliament: 8 MPs
- Police: Humberside Police (North East Lincolnshire & North Lincolnshire areas) & Lincolnshire Police (Lincolnshire County Council area)
- Ceremonial county
- Lord Lieutenant: Toby Dennis
- High Sheriff: Susan Patricia Liburd
- Area: 6,976 km^{2} (2,693 sq mi)
  - Rank: 2nd of 48
- Population (2024): 1,120,749
  - Rank: 20th of 48
  - Density: 161/km^{2} (420/sq mi)
- Non-metropolitan county
- County council: Lincolnshire County Council
- Control: Reform UK
- Admin HQ: Lincoln
- Area: 5,937 km^{2} (2,292 sq mi)
  - Rank: 2nd of 21
- Population (2025): 794,009
  - Rank: 13th of 21
  - Density: 134/km^{2} (350/sq mi)
- ISO 3166-2: GB-LIN
- GSS code: E10000019
- ITL: TLF30
- Website: lincolnshire.gov.uk
- Districts
- Districts of Lincolnshire; Unitary County council area
- Districts: List: Lincoln; North Kesteven; South Kesteven; South Holland; Boston; East Lindsey; West Lindsey; North Lincolnshire; North East Lincolnshire

Lincolnshire (/ˈlɪŋkənʃər, -ʃɪər/) is a ceremonial county in the East Midlands and Yorkshire and the Humber regions of England. It is bordered by the East Riding of Yorkshire across the Humber estuary to the north, the North Sea to the east, Norfolk, Cambridgeshire, Northamptonshire, and Rutland to the south, and Leicestershire, Nottinghamshire, and South Yorkshire to the west.

The county is predominantly rural, with an area of 6,959 km^{2} (2,687 sq mi) and an estimated population of 1,120,749 in 2024. The cathedral and county city of Lincoln is located in the mid-west of the county close to the county border with Nottinghamshire. The port town of Grimsby is in the north-east coast of the county, Boston in the south-east, Grantham in the south-west and Scunthorpe in the north-west. For local government purposes Lincolnshire comprises a non-metropolitan county, with seven districts, and the unitary authority areas of North Lincolnshire and North East Lincolnshire. The last two areas are part of the Yorkshire and the Humber region, and the rest of the county is in the East Midlands. The non-metropolitan county council and two unitary councils collaborate through the Greater Lincolnshire Combined County Authority.

The county is the second largest in England and has a varied geography. The south-east contains part of the Fens, a naturally marshy region which has been drained for agriculture, and the south-west is an upland region. A wide vale runs north–south from the centre to the north of the county. To its east, the chalk hills of the Lincolnshire Wolds, which have been designated a national landscape, occupy the north-east, with a coastal plain and the Lincolnshire Marsh beyond. The west of the vale is demarcated by the Lincolnshire Edge, a long escarpment; at its northern end are the Coversands, an area of heath. Beyond the edge, the western border of the county contains the eastern part of the Trent Valley and, in the north, part of the Humberhead Levels, with the River Trent itself forming part of the border.

Lincolnshire has had a comparatively quiet history, being a predominantly rural county that was not heavily industrialised and faced relatively limited external threats compared to other regions of England. In the Roman era Lincoln was a major settlement, called Lindum Colonia. In the fifth century what would become the county was settled by the invading Angles, who established the Kingdom of Lindsey in the north of the region. Lincoln became the centre of a diocese in 1072, and Lincoln Cathedral was built over the following centuries. The late Middle Ages were a particularly prosperous period, when wealth from wool trade facilitated the building of the grand wool churches such as St Botolph's Church, Boston. During the Second World War the relatively flat topography of the county made it an important base for the Royal Air Force, which gave rise to the nickname 'Bomber County'.

== History ==
The historic county of Lincolnshire and its ancient subdivisions of Holland, Kesteven and the three ridings of Lindsey

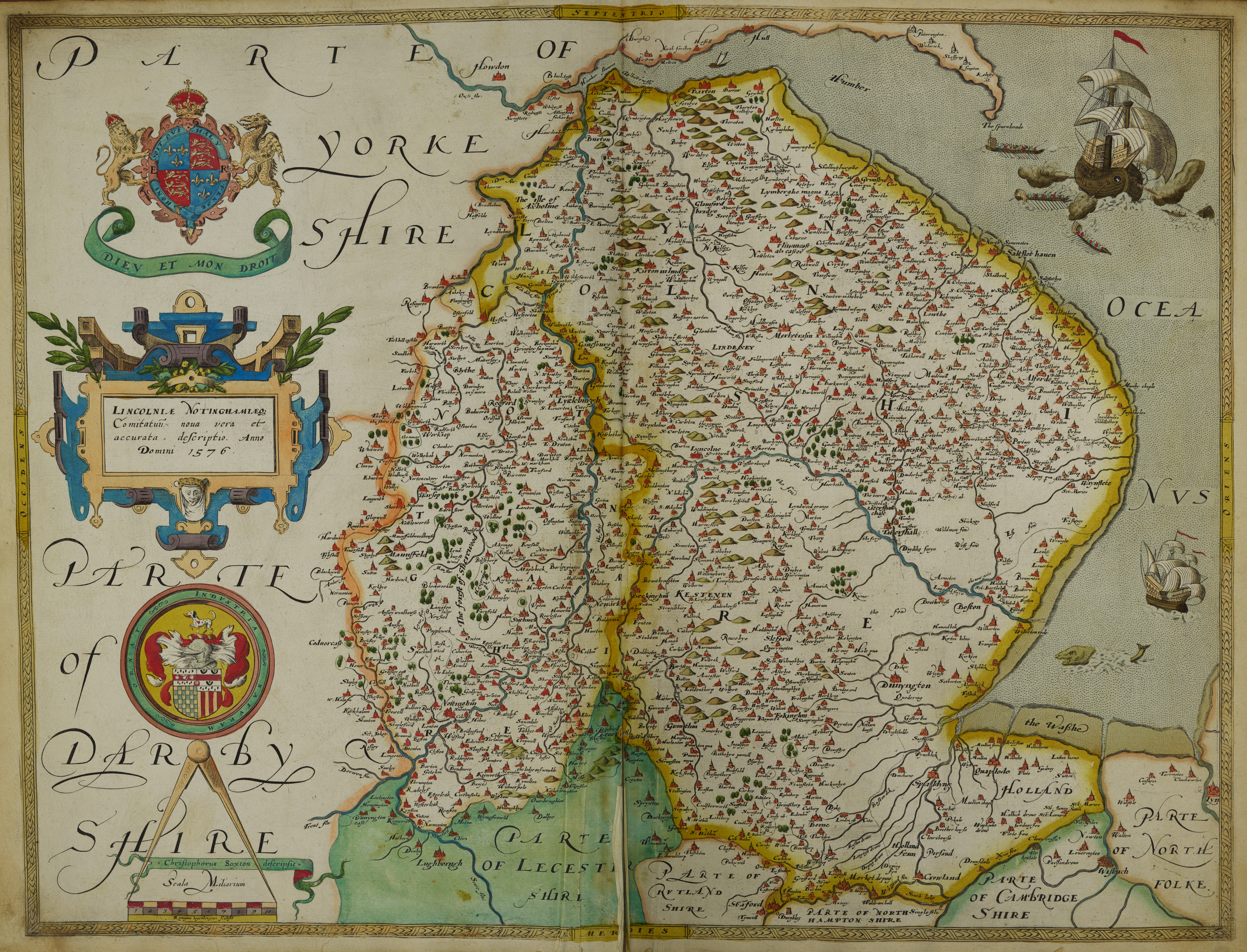
Hand-drawn map of Lincolnshire and Nottinghamshire from 1576

During pre-Roman times, most of Lincolnshire was inhabited by the Corieltauvi people. The language of the area at that time would have been Common Brittonic, the precursor to modern Welsh, Cornish and Breton. The name Lincoln was derived from Lindum Colonia.

Large numbers of Germanic speakers from continental Europe settled in the region following the withdrawal of the Romans. Though these were later identified as Angles, it is unlikely that they migrated as part of an organised tribal group. Thus, the main language of the region quickly became Old English. However, it is possible that Brittonic continued to be spoken in some communities as late as the eighth century.

Modern-day Lincolnshire is derived from the merging of the territory of the Kingdom of Lindsey with that controlled by the Danelaw borough of Stamford. For some time the entire county was called "Lindsey", and it is recorded as such in the 11th-century Domesday Book. Later, the name Lindsey was applied to the northern core, around Lincoln. This emerged as one of the three Parts of Lincolnshire, along with the Parts of Holland in the south-east, and the Parts of Kesteven in the south-west, which each had separate quarter sessions as their county administrations. Lindsey was traditionally split between the North, South and West Ridings of Lindsey.

The area was shaken by 27 February 2008 Lincolnshire earthquake, reaching between 4.7 and 5.3 on the Richter magnitude scale; it was one of the largest earthquakes to affect Britain in recent years.

Lincolnshire is home to Woolsthorpe Manor, birthplace and home of Sir Isaac Newton. He attended The King's School, Grantham. Its library has preserved his signature, carved into a window sill when he was a youth.

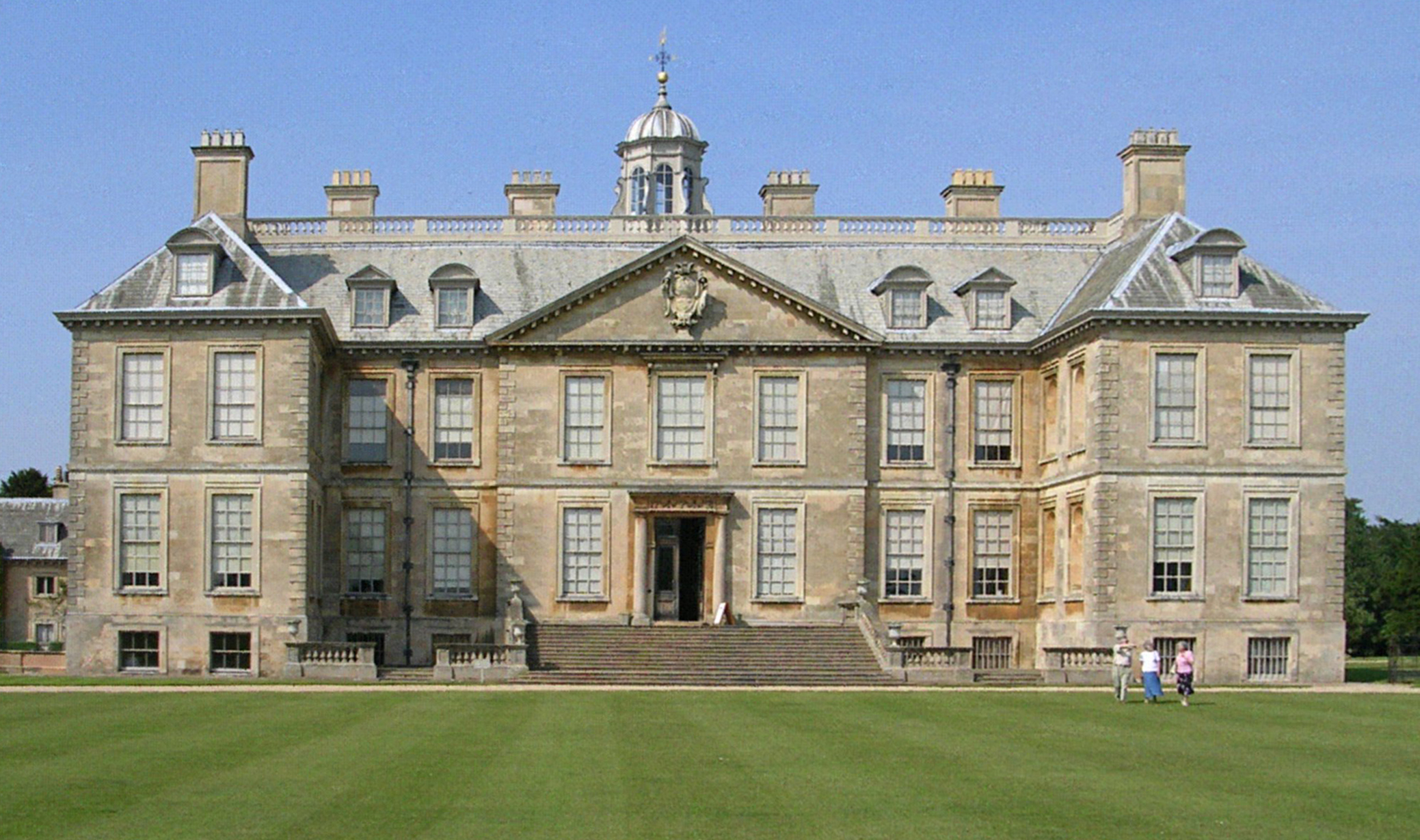
Belton House

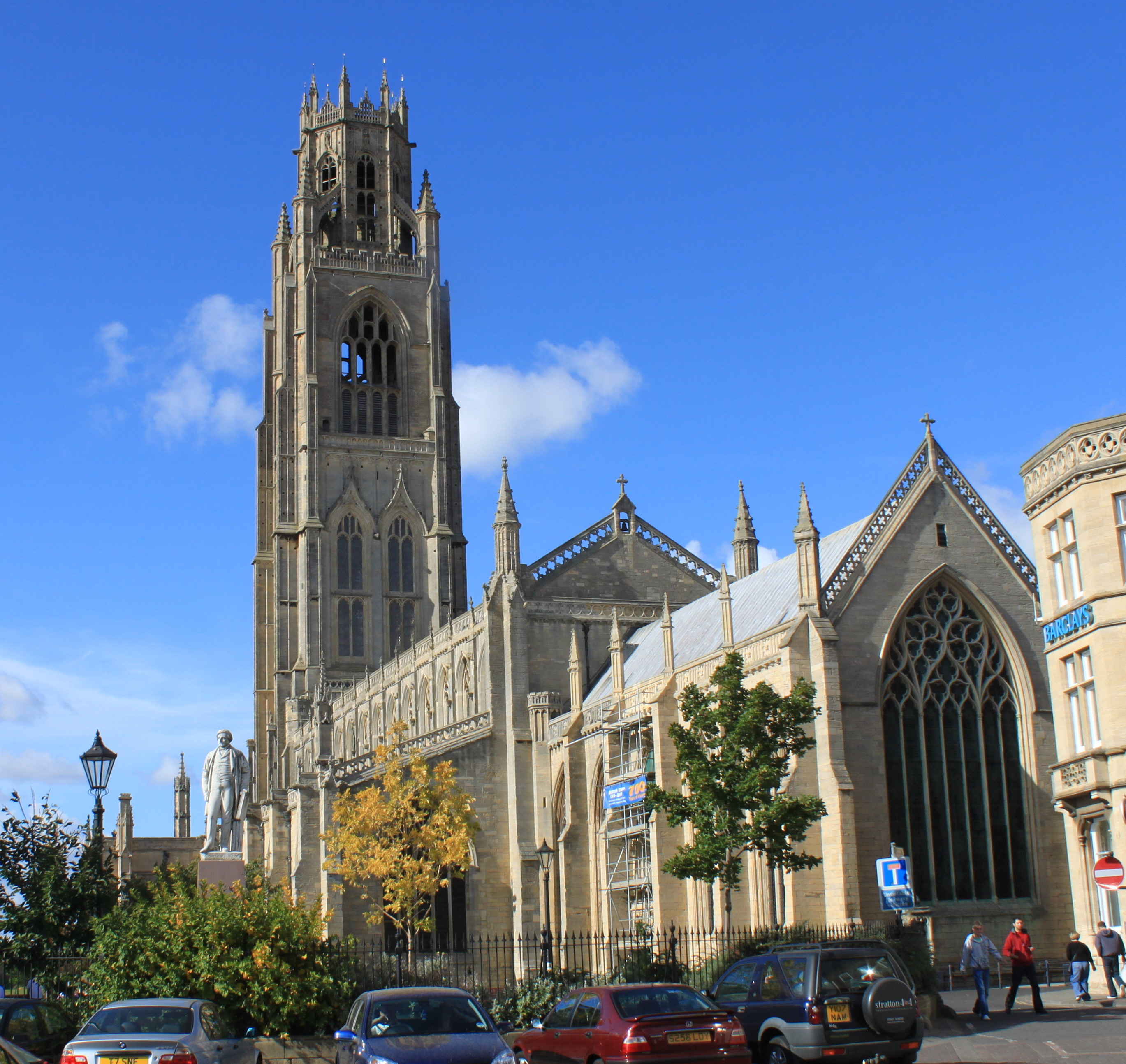
Boston Stump

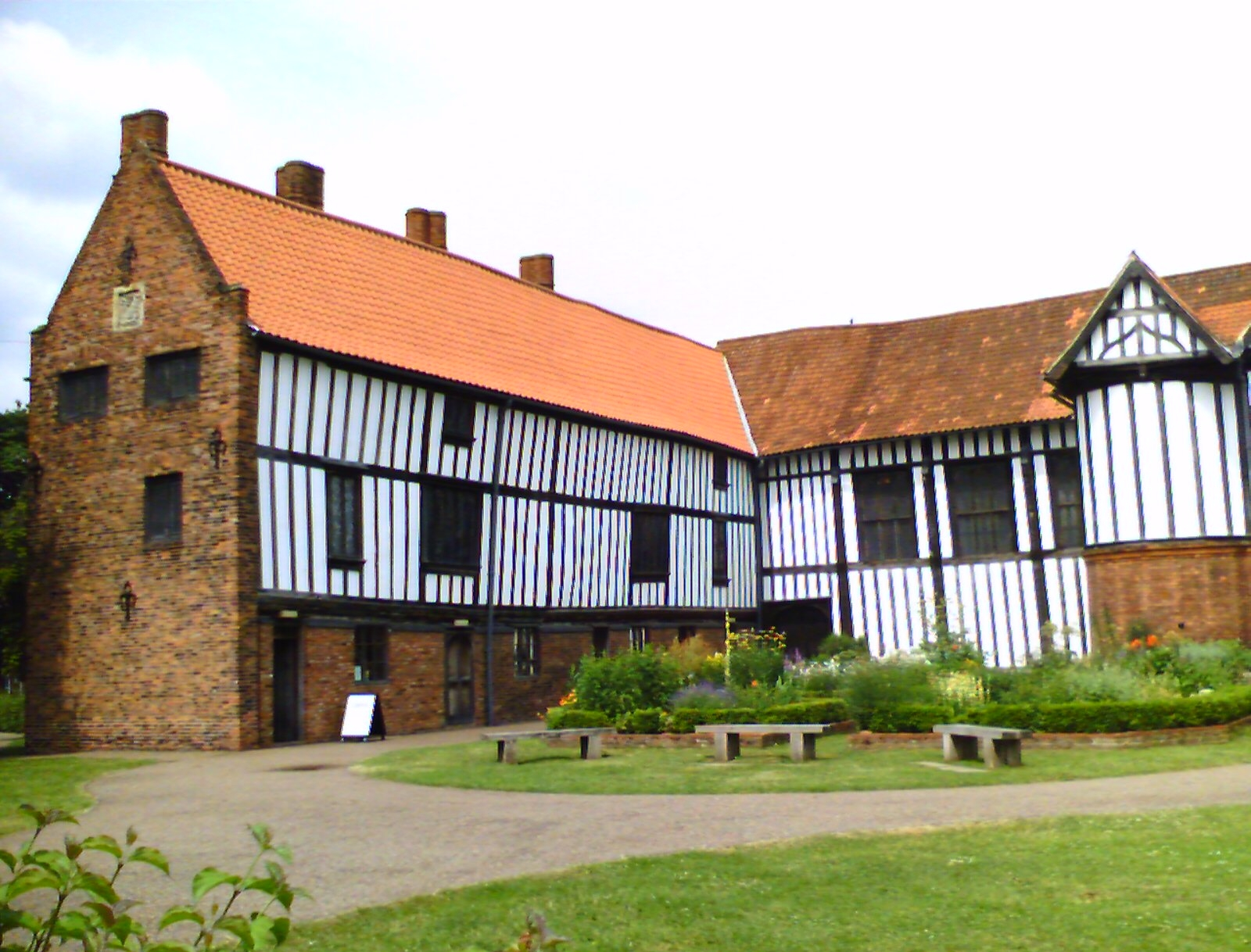
Gainsborough Old Hall

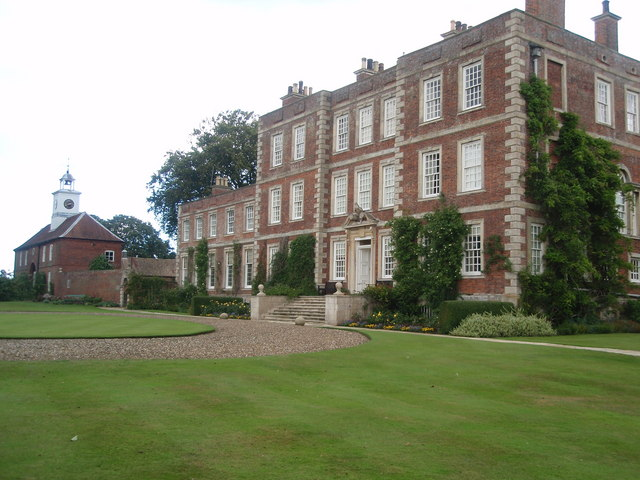
Gunby Hall

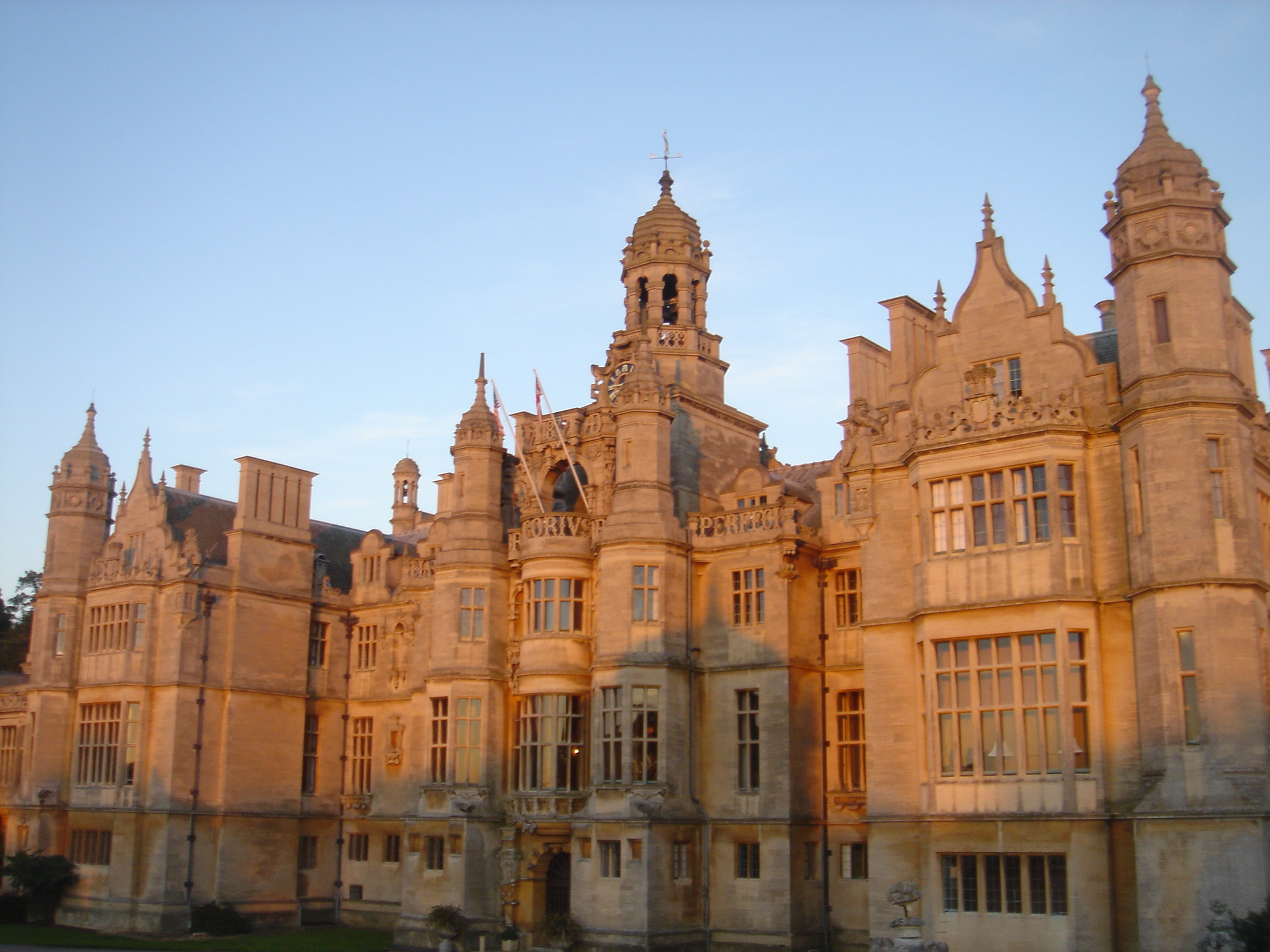
Harlaxton Manor

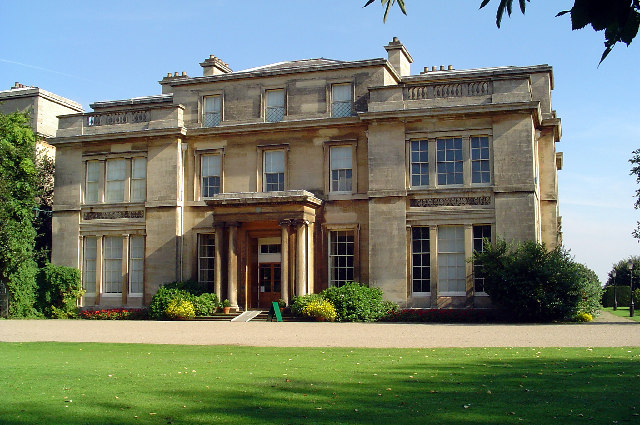
Normanby Hall

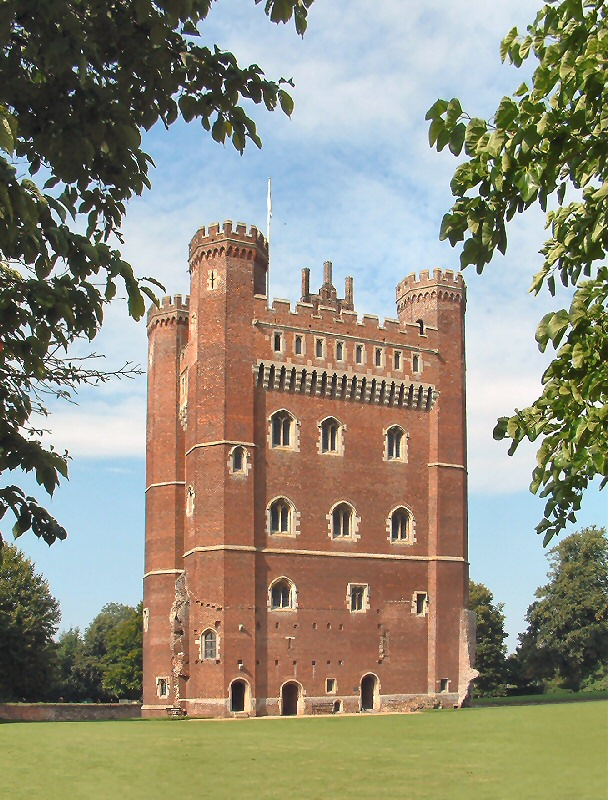
Tattershall Castle

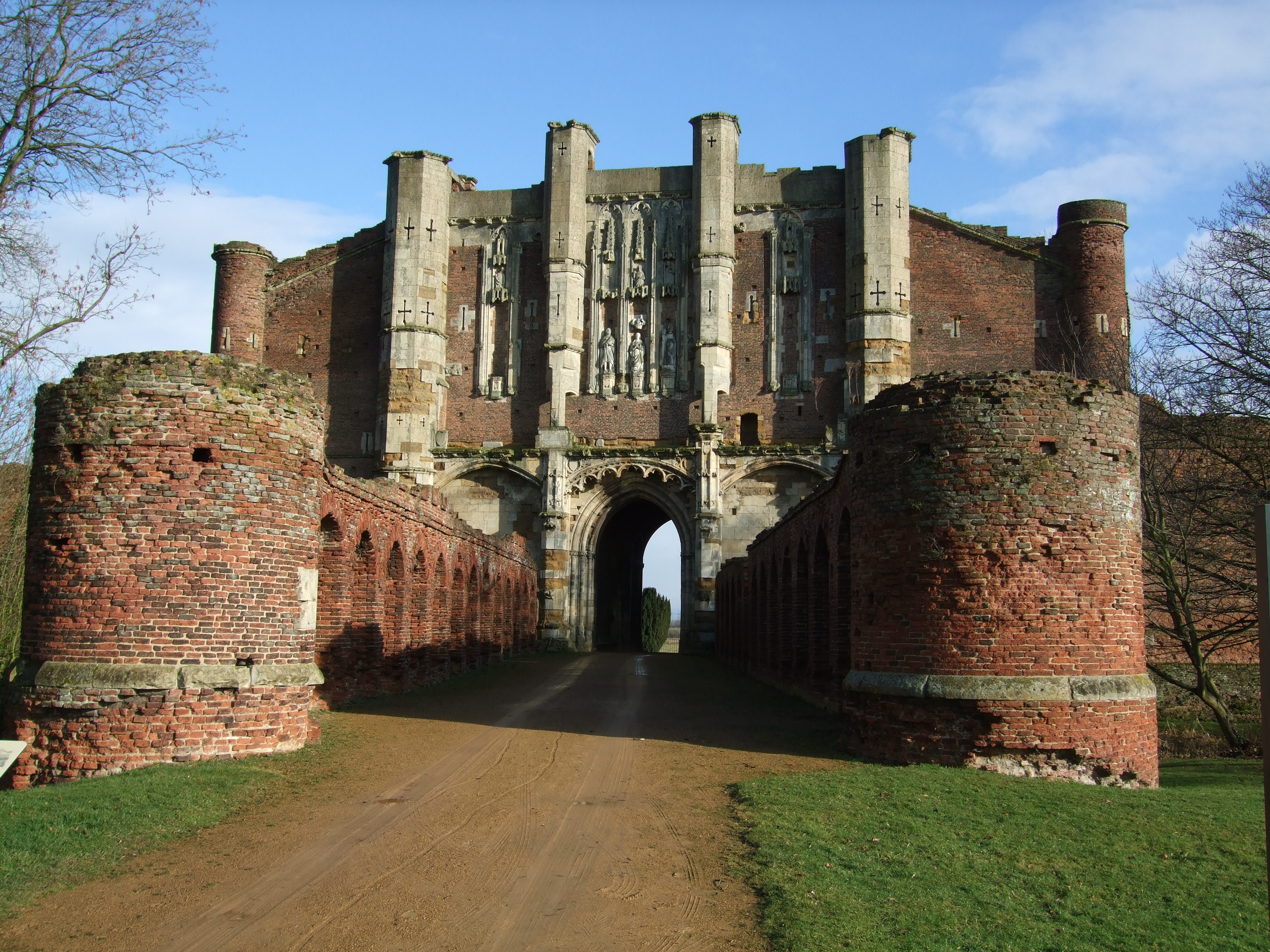
Thornton Abbey

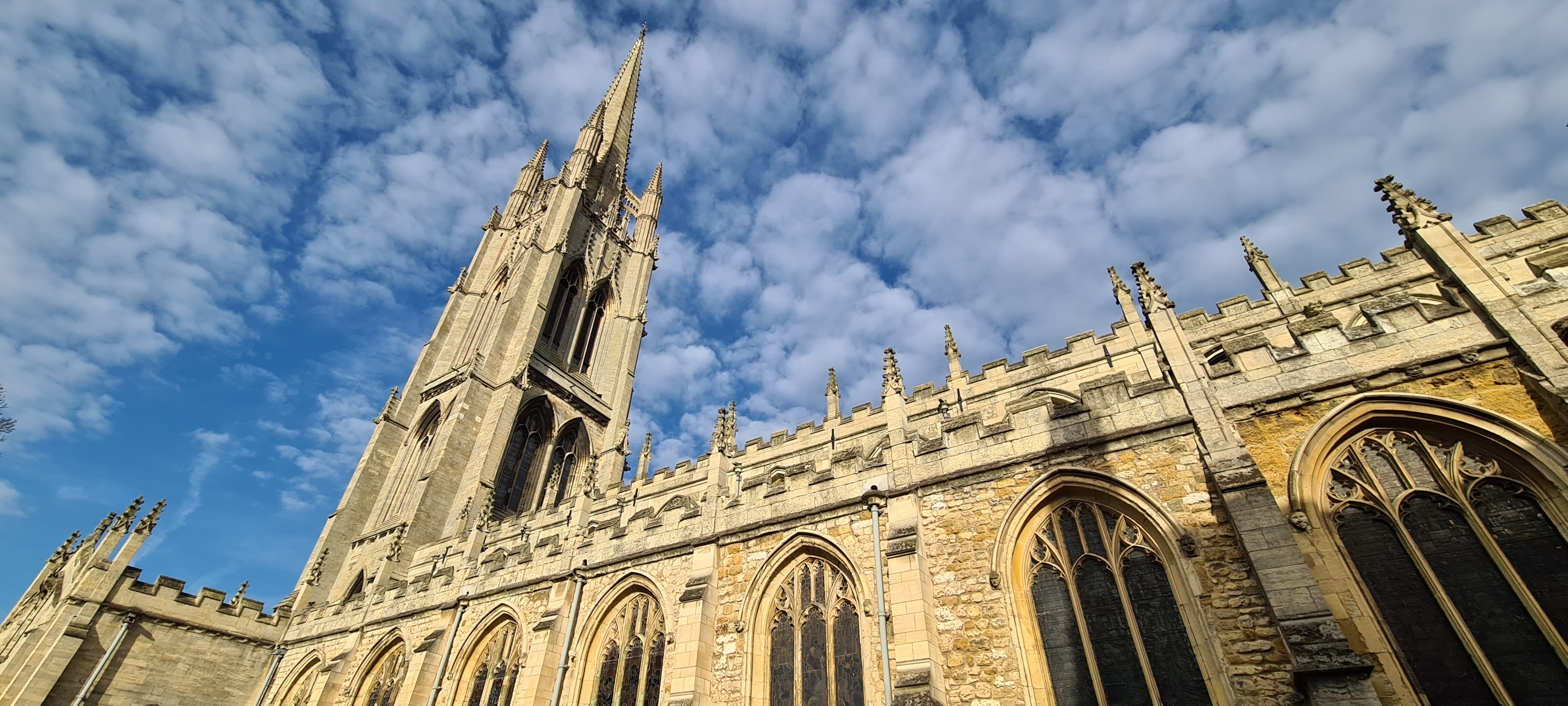
St James' Church, Louth

== Geography ==
The ceremonial county of Lincolnshire as defined under the Lieutenancies Act 1997.

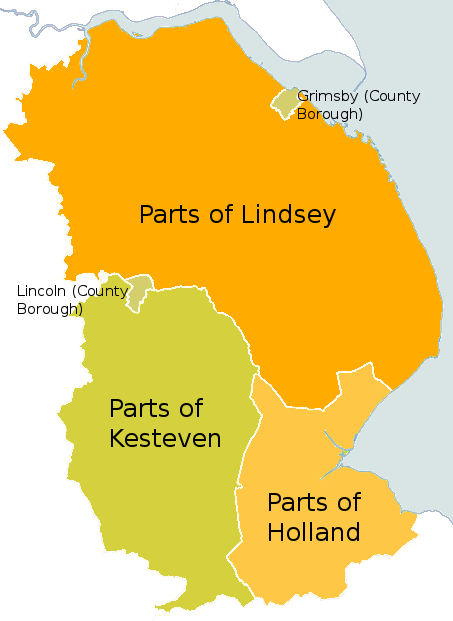
County and county borough areas pre 1965

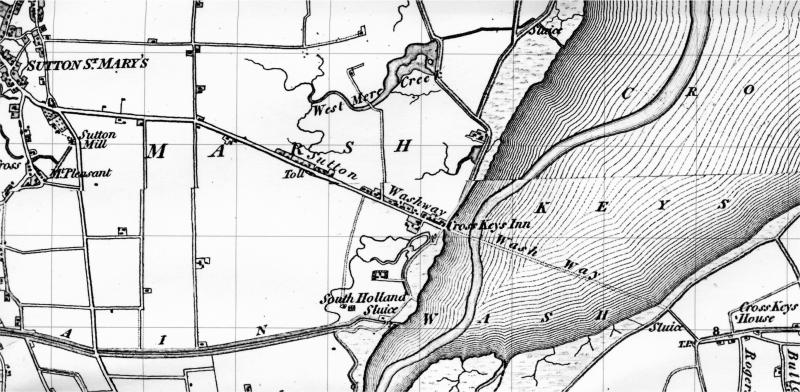
Until the early 19th century there was no fixed land border between Lincolnshire and Norfolk, as the two counties were separated by the former "Cross Keys Wash" which could only be crossed at low tide by a causeway.

The geographical layout of Lincolnshire is quite extensive and mostly separated by many rivers and rolling countryside. The north of the county begins from where the Isle of Axholme is located near the meeting points of the rivers Ouse and Trent near to the Humber. From there, the southside of the Humber estuary forms the border between Lincolnshire and the East Riding of Yorkshire. From there, the south bank of the Humber Estuary where the Humber Bridge crosses the estuary at Barton upon Humber, is used primarily for the shipping ports at Immingham, New Holland and Grimsby. From there, the rest of the southern bank forms the Lincolnshire Coast from Cleethorpes to Mablethorpe and then onto Skegness. From Skegness, the rest of the Lincolnshire Coastline forms the sea boundary and border with Norfolk at the Wash. The coast then at Boston becomes the meeting point of the rivers Welland and Haven in an area known as the "Fosdyke Wash".

The rest of the sea boundary runs from Fosdyke to the east of Sutton Bridge, where the current land boundary with Norfolk is located in a narrow area of reclaimed farmland just to the east of the River Nene. Until as recently as the early 19th century there was no land border between Lincolnshire and Norfolk. The counties were separated from each other by the "Cross Keys Wash", a former area of estuary and marshland where the River Nene flowed into the Wash, which could only be crossed at low tide by a causeway or ferry, and was the natural boundary between the two. The causeway known at the time as the "Wash Way" was renowned as being particularly treacherous and the safer route was to go into Norfolk from Lincolnshire via the Cambridgeshire town of Wisbech and this element remains to the present day as the Cross Keys Bridge at Sutton Bridge provides the only direct access point to Norfolk from Lincolnshire over the River Nene some nine miles north of Wisbech. The border with Lincolnshire to Cambridgeshire begins at Crowland, Market Deeping and Stamford which form the southern boundary of the county with both Peterborough, Rutland and briefly Northamptonshire; the county's border with Northamptonshire is just 20 yards (19 m) long, England's shortest county boundary. From there, the border with Leicestershire and Nottinghamshire begins at Sleaford, Grantham, Lincoln and Gainsborough. From Gainsborough, the border with South Yorkshire begins at Haxey and Epworth before looping back to the original north of the county near Scunthorpe with East Riding of Yorkshire at the Isle of Axholme and Goole.

Bedrock in Lincolnshire features Jurassic limestone (near Lincoln) and Cretaceous chalk (north-east). The area around Woodhall Spa and Kirkby on Bain is dominated by gravel and sand. For much of prehistory, Lincolnshire was under tropical seas, and most fossils found in the county are marine invertebrates. Marine vertebrates have also been found including ichthyosaurus and plesiosaur.

The highest point in Lincolnshire is Wolds Top (168 m, 551 ft), at Normanby le Wold. Some parts of the Fens may be below sea level. The nearest mountains are in Derbyshire.

The biggest rivers in Lincolnshire are the Trent, running northwards from Staffordshire up the western edge of the county to the Humber estuary, and the Witham, which begins in Lincolnshire at South Witham and runs for 132 km (82 miles) through the middle of the county, eventually emptying into the North Sea at The Wash. The Humber estuary, on Lincolnshire's northern border, is also fed by the River Ouse. The Wash is also the mouth of the Welland, the Nene and the Great Ouse.

Lincolnshire's geography is fairly varied, but consists of several distinct areas:

- Lincolnshire Wolds: area of rolling hills in the north-east of the county designated an Area of Outstanding Natural Beauty
- The Fens: dominating the south-east quarter of the county
- The Marshes: running along the coast of the county
- Lincoln Edge or Cliff: limestone escarpment running north–south along the western half of the county

Lincolnshire's most well-known nature reserves include Gibraltar Point National Nature Reserve, Whisby Nature Park Local Nature Reserve, Donna Nook National Nature Reserve, RSPB Frampton Marsh and the Humberhead Peatlands National Nature Reserve. Although the Lincolnshire countryside is intensively farmed, there are many biodiverse wetland areas, as well as rare limewood forests. Much of the county was once wet fenland (see The Fens).

From bones, we can tell that animal species formerly found in Lincolnshire include woolly mammoth, woolly rhinoceros, wild horse, wolf, wild boar, and beaver. Species which have recently returned to Lincolnshire after extirpation include little egret, Eurasian spoonbill, European otter and red kite.

== Governance ==
=== Local government history ===
The Local Government Act 1888 established county councils for each of the parts of Lincolnshire – Lindsey, Holland and Kesteven – and came into effect on 1 April 1889. Lincoln was made an independent county borough on the same date, with Grimsby following in 1891.

The Local Government Act 1972 removed the northern part of Lindsey from Lincolnshire altogether.

The Local Government Act 1972 abolished the three county councils and the two county boroughs, effective 1 April 1974. On this date, Grimsby and the northern part of Lindsey (including Scunthorpe) were amalgamated with most of the East Riding of Yorkshire and a part of the West Riding of Yorkshire to form the new non-metropolitan county of Humberside. The rest of Lindsey, along with Holland, Kesteven and Lincoln, came under the governance of the new Lincolnshire County Council.

A local government reform in 1996 abolished Humberside. The land south of the Humber Estuary was allocated to the unitary authorities of North Lincolnshire and North East Lincolnshire which became part of Lincolnshire for ceremonial purposes, such as the Lord-Lieutenancy, but are not covered by the Lincolnshire police; they are in the Yorkshire and the Humber region. The remaining districts of Lincolnshire are Boston, East Lindsey, Lincoln, North Kesteven, South Holland, South Kesteven, and West Lindsey. They are part of the East Midlands region.

North East Lincolnshire and North Lincolnshire are unitary authorities. The areas were part of Humberside county from 1974. In 1996, Humberside was abolished along with its county council. Some services in those districts are shared with the East Riding of Yorkshire ceremonial county, rather than the rest of Lincolnshire including Humberside Police, Humberside Airport, Humberside Fire Service, and BBC Radio Humberside.

=== Current governance ===
Since the 2024 general election and the constituency reorganisation by the 2023 periodic review, Lincolnshire is represented by ten members of Parliament (MPs) whose constituencies fall entirely within the county. Small areas of Lincolnshire form constituencies with parts of neighbouring counties, namely the Isle of Axholme (part of Doncaster East and the Isle of Axholme) and the town of Stamford and its surroundings (part of Rutland and Stamford). Of the ten constituencies entirely within Lincolnshire, six are represented by the Conservative Party, three by the Labour Party and one by Reform UK.

Lincolnshire County Council is majority controlled by Reform UK and consists of forty-four Reform UK councillors, fourteen Conservative, five Liberal Democrats, three Labour, three independents, and one Lincolnshire Independent. The county is made up of seven local borough and district councils and two unitary authority areas independent of the county council. The City of Lincoln Council is Labour-controlled. North Kesteven, South Holland and East Lindsey are administered by the Conservatives. South Kesteven is controlled by a coalition of independent, Labour Party, Green Party and Liberal Democrat councillors. West Lindsey is controlled by a coalition of Liberal Democrats and independents. The Borough of Boston is controlled by the local Boston Independent party. The unitary authority North Lincolnshire and North East Lincolnshire councils are administered by the Conservative Party.

The Greater Lincolnshire devolution area

A mayoral devolution deal has received approval from the Secretary of State for Housing, Communities and Local Government. This led to the establishment of a Greater Lincolnshire Combined County Authority, formed of the county council, the two unitary authorities and the district councils, with powers over housing, job creation and public transport, including bus franchising. The first election for the Mayor of Greater Lincolnshire, who will chair GLCCA, took place in May 2025. Reform UK Andrea Jenkyns was elected and Reform UK took control of Lincolnshire County Council.

==== Central Lincolnshire ====
The Central Lincolnshire area is a joint partnership arrangement between North Kesteven, Lincoln and West Lindsey, covering economic planning and development across the three districts.

=== Future ===
In July 2026, the Government of the United Kingdom announced that Lincolnshire would be reorganised into four unitary authority areas by April 2028. The non-metropolitan county of Lincolnshire and its seven districts will be replaced by two unitary authority areas; one will cover the current Lincoln district and some wards of West Lindsey and North Kesteven, and the other will cover the remainder of the present non-metropolitan county. Their names have not yet been decided. North Lincolnshire and North East Lincolnshire will be unchanged. Elections to the new unitary councils are expected to take place in May 2027.

== Demography ==
These tables show the ethnic and religious composition of Lincolnshire non-metropolitan county in 2021:

Ethnicity (2021)
White	Asian	Black	Mixed and other
96%	2%	1%	1%

Religion (2021)
Christianity	Islam	Other	No religion
53.7%	0.7%	0.5%	38.3%

== Economy ==
Gross value added of Lincolnshire (£ millions)
Year	County-wide	Agriculture^{[a]}	Industry^{[b]}	Services^{[c]}
1995	5,719	657	1,769	3,292
2000	6,512	452	2,046	4,013
2003	8,419	518	2,518	5,383

^{a} includes hunting and forestry
^{b} includes energy and construction
^{c} includes financial intermediation services indirectly measured

Notable businesses based in Lincolnshire include the Lincs FM Group, Young's Seafood, Openfield and the Lincolnshire Co-operative (whose membership includes about one quarter of the population of the county).

=== Agriculture ===
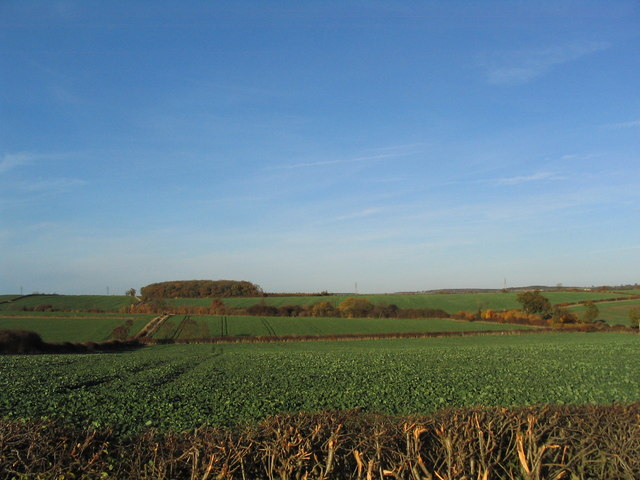
Lincolnshire farmland near Burton Coggles

Lincolnshire has long been a primarily agricultural area, and it continues to grow large amounts of wheat, barley, sugar beet, and oilseed rape. In south Lincolnshire, where the soil is particularly rich in nutrients, some of the most common crops include potatoes, cabbages, cauliflowers, and onions. Lincolnshire farmers often break world records for crop yields. South Lincolnshire is also home to one of the UK's leading agricultural experiment stations, located in Sutton Bridge and operated by the Potato Council; Sutton Bridge Crop Storage Research engages in research for the British potato industry.

Lincolnshire has produced named breeds of cattle, sheep and pigs. The Lincoln Red is an old breed of beef cattle, originating from the county. The Lincoln Longwool is a rare breed of sheep, named after the county, which was developed both for wool and mutton, at least 500 years ago, and has the longest fleece of any breed. The Lincolnshire Curly Coat breed of pig is now extinct. In the mid 20th century most farms in Lincolnshire moved away from mixed farming to specialise in arable cropping, partly due to cheap wool imports, partly to take advantage of efficiencies of scale and partly because the drier land on the eastern side of England is particularly suitable for arable cropping.

Mechanisation around 1900 greatly diminished the number of workers required to operate the county's relatively large farms, and the proportion of workers in the agricultural sector dropped substantially during this period. Several major engineering companies developed in Lincoln, Gainsborough and Grantham to support those changes. Among these was Fosters of Lincoln, which built the first tank, and Richard Hornsby & Sons of Grantham. Most such industrial companies left during late 20th-century restructuring.

Today, immigrant workers, mainly from new member states of the European Union in Central and Eastern Europe, form a large component of the seasonal agricultural workforce, particularly in the south of the county. Here more labour-intensive crops are produced, such as small vegetables and cut flowers. This seasonal influx of migrant labour occasionally causes tension between the migrant workforce and local people, in a county which had been relatively unaccustomed to large-scale immigration. Agricultural training is provided at Riseholme College and in 2016 the University of Lincoln opened the Lincoln Institute for Agri-Food Technology.

=== Services and retail ===
According to an Intra-governmental Group on Geographic Information (IGGI) study in 2000, the town centres were ranked by area thus (including North Lincolnshire and North East Lincolnshire areas):

- Lincoln
- Grantham
- Grimsby
- Boston and Scunthorpe (equal)
- Spalding
- Stamford
- Skegness
- Louth
- Sleaford
- Gainsborough
- Brigg
- Cleethorpes
- Bourne
- Horncastle and Mablethorpe (equal)

== Public services ==
=== Education ===
Lincolnshire is one of the few counties in the UK that still uses the eleven-plus to decide who may attend grammar school. As a result, many towns in Lincolnshire have both a grammar school and a secondary modern school. Lincolnshire's rural character means that some larger villages also have primary schools and are served by buses to nearby high schools.

Lincoln itself, however, is primarily non-selective, as is the area within a radius of about seven miles. In this area, almost all children attend comprehensive schools, though it is still possible to opt into the eleven-plus system. This gives rise to the unusual result that those who pass the eleven-plus can attend a grammar school outside the Lincoln comprehensive area, but those who do not pass still attend a (partly non-selective) comprehensive school.

Lincolnshire is also home of University of Lincoln.

=== Health care ===
The United Lincolnshire Hospitals NHS Trust is one of the largest trusts in the country, employing almost 4,000 staff and with an annual budget of over £200 million. The north of the county is served by the Northern Lincolnshire and Goole Hospitals NHS Foundation Trust.

Some of the larger hospitals in the county include:

- Diana, Princess of Wales Hospital, Grimsby
- Scunthorpe General Hospital
- Boston Pilgrim Hospital
- Lincoln County Hospital

Since April 1994, Lincolnshire has had an air ambulance service. The air ambulance is stationed at RAF Waddington near Lincoln and can reach emergencies in Lincolnshire within 25 minutes. An A&E hospital is only 10 minutes away by helicopter from any accident in Lincolnshire.

=== Drainage ===
Separately to the commercial water companies the low-lying parts of the county are drained by various internal drainage boards, such as the Black Sluice Internal Drainage Board, Witham 4th District IDB, Lindsey Marsh Drainage Board, or the Welland and Deepings Internal Drainage Board.

== Transport ==
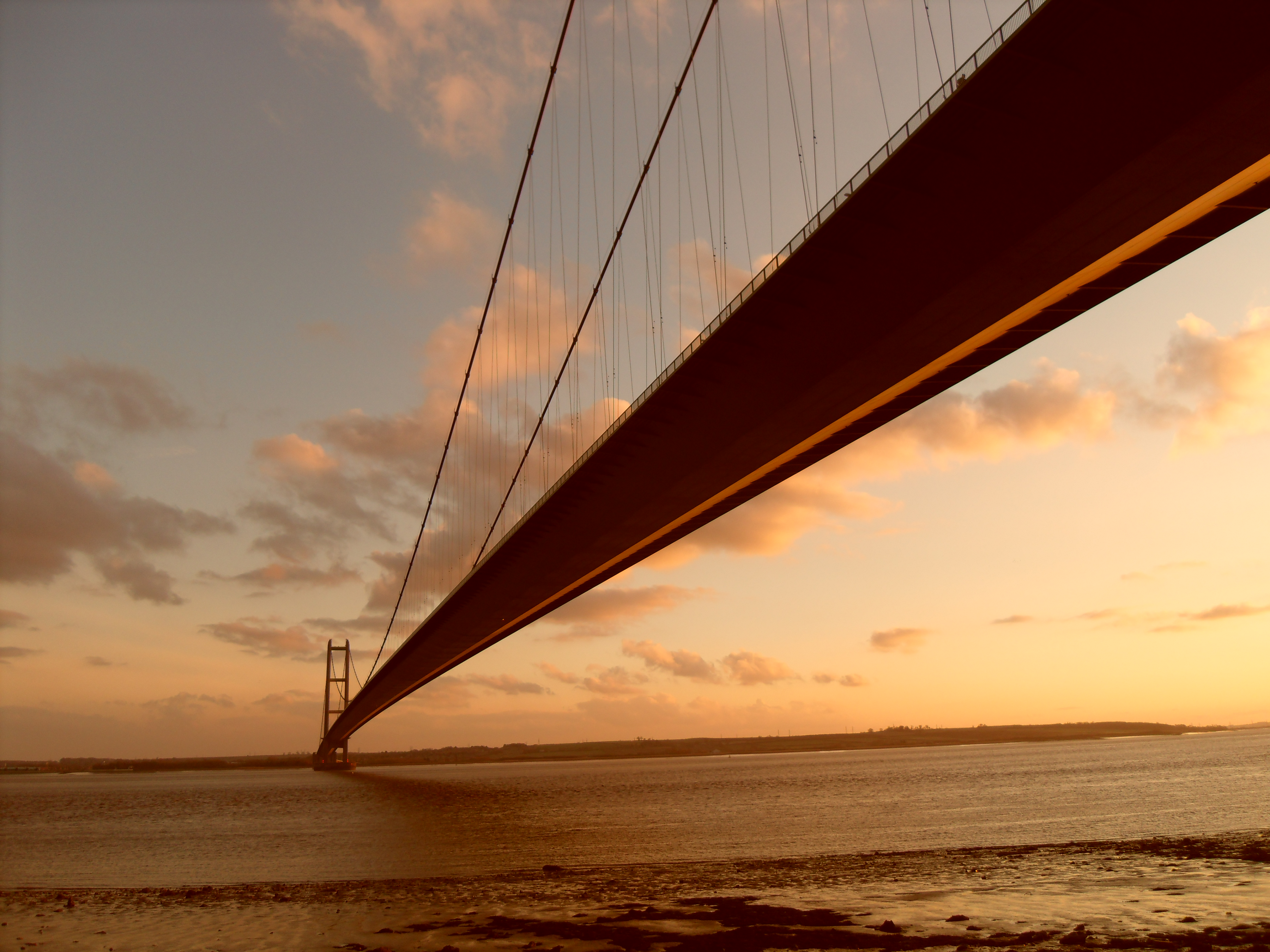
The Humber Bridge connecting North Lincolnshire to the East Riding of Yorkshire

=== Roads ===
Being on the economic periphery of England, Lincolnshire's transport links are poorly developed compared with many other parts of the United Kingdom. The road network in the county is dominated by single carriageway A roads and local roads (B roads) as opposed to motorways and dual carriageways. The administrative county of Lincolnshire is one of the few UK counties without a motorway, and until several years ago, it was said that there was only about 35 km (22 mi) of dual carriageway in the whole of Lincolnshire. However the M180 motorway passes through North Lincolnshire, splitting into two dual carriageway trunk roads to the Humber Bridge and Grimsby, and the A46 is now dual carriageway between Newark-on-Trent and Lincoln.

=== Railways: history and present day ===
The low population density of the county means there are few railway stations and train services, considering the county's large area. Many of the county's railway stations were permanently closed following the Beeching Report of 1963. The most notable reopening has been the line and two stations between Lincoln and Sleaford, which reopened within months of the Beeching closure. Most other closed lines in the county were lifted long ago and much of the trackbed has returned to agricultural use.

Prior to 1970, a through train service operated between Cleethorpes and London King's Cross via Louth, Boston and Peterborough. The part of this line in Grimsby is now the A16 road, preventing reinstatement as a railway line, and a small section of the line is now the Lincolnshire Wolds Railway, with an extension towards Louth in progress.

A daily through train service operated between Cleethorpes and London King's Cross via Grimsby, Market Rasen and Lincoln Central until the late 1980s. The Humberlincs Executive, as the service was known, was operated by an InterCity 125, but was discontinued following the electrification of the East Coast Main Line. Passengers to/from London now have to change trains at Newark North Gate. However, the East Coast Main Line passes through the western edge of the county and one can catch direct trains to London from Grantham.

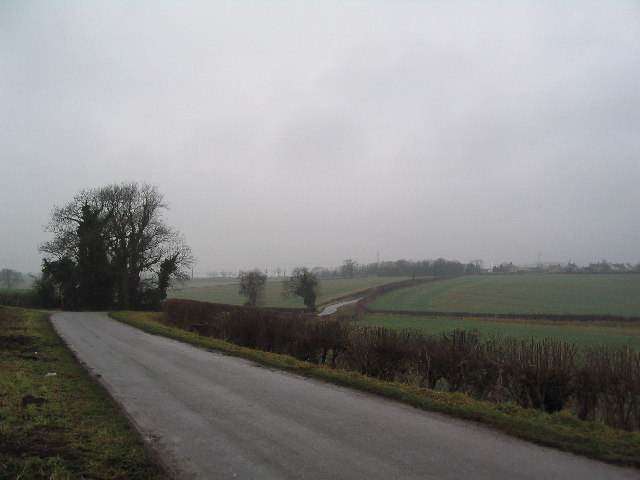
A rural road in Lincolnshire

Most rail services are currently operated by East Midlands Railway and Northern Trains. London North Eastern Railway (LNER), Hull Trains and CrossCountry have services which pass through the county, with LNER trains frequently passing and stopping at Grantham, on the East Coast Main Line and a service every other hour to Lincoln, while CrossCountry trains stop at Stamford on their way between Birmingham and Stansted Airport. Stations along the Humber are served by TransPennine Express services between Manchester Airport and Cleethorpes. One of the most infrequent services in the UK is in Lincolnshire: the Sheffield-Gainsborough Central-Cleethorpes line has passenger trains only on a Saturday, with three trains in both directions. This line is, however, used for freight. Hull Trains also stops at Grantham before continuing its journey to either Kings Cross or Hull.

On 22 May 2011, East Coast started a Lincoln-London service, initially one train a day each way, and there is a northbound service on a Sunday. This was increased in 2019 to a service every two hours. East Midlands Railway also run a daily (Mon-Sat) service each way between Lincoln and London St Pancras, though this is a stopping service which takes around three hours via Nottingham, compared to LNER's service to London King's Cross which takes around 1 hour 50 minutes.

=== Airport ===
The only airport in Lincolnshire is Humberside Airport, near Brigg. East Midlands Airport, the main airport servicing the East Midlands, is within travelling distance of the county. Until its closure in 2022, Doncaster Sheffield Airport near Doncaster was within travelling distance of much of Lincolnshire.

=== Buses ===
The county's biggest bus companies are Stagecoach Grimsby-Cleethorpes (formerly Grimsby-Cleethorpes Transport) and Stagecoach in Lincolnshire (formerly Lincolnshire Road Car). There are several smaller bus companies, including Brylaine of Boston, Delaine Buses, PC Coaches and Hornsby's of Scunthorpe.

=== Cycle routes ===
- A Sustrans cycle route runs from Lincoln to Boston in the south of the county.
- Historic Lincoln & Surrounding Area.
- All Lincolnshire cycle routes

== Towns and villages ==
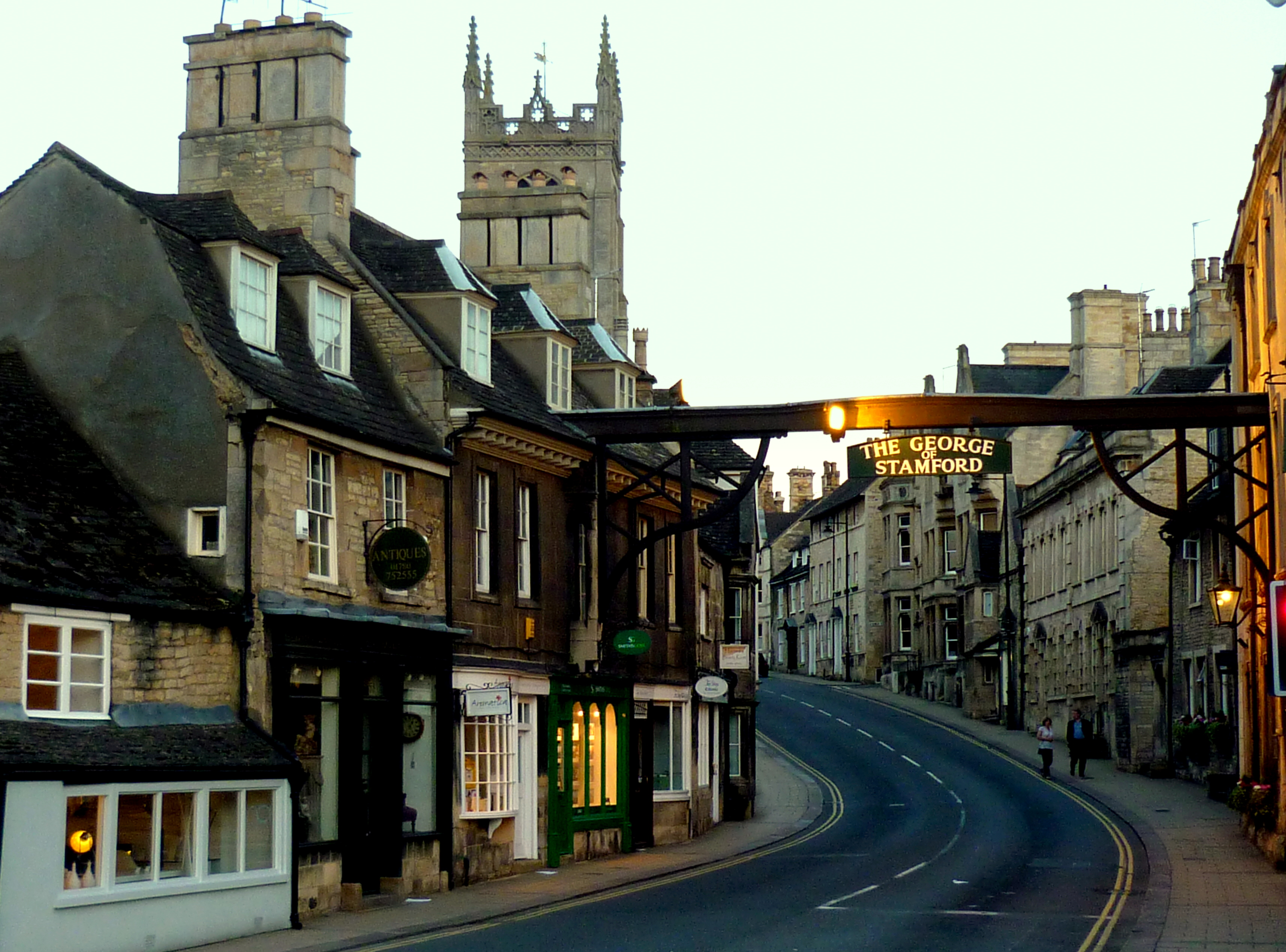
Stamford

In terms of population, the 12 biggest settlements in the county by population are:

- Lincoln (population: 104,565)
- Grimsby (population: 85,911)
- Scunthorpe (population: 81,286)
- Boston (population: 45,339)
- Grantham (population: 44,898)
- Spalding (population: 30,556)
- Cleethorpes (population: 29,678)
- Gainsborough (population: 21,908)
- Stamford (population: 20,742)
- Skegness (population: 20,704)
- Sleaford (population: 18,033)
- Bourne (population: 17,490)

A small part of the Thorne Waste area of the town of Thorne in South Yorkshire, known as the Yorkshire Triangle, currently falls under North Lincolnshire.

== Tourism ==
The majority of tourism in Lincolnshire relies on the coastal resorts and towns to the east of the Lincolnshire Wolds. The county has some of the best-known seaside resorts in the United Kingdom, which are a major attraction to visitors from across England, especially the East Midlands and parts of Yorkshire. There are three main coastal resorts in Lincolnshire and several smaller village resorts:

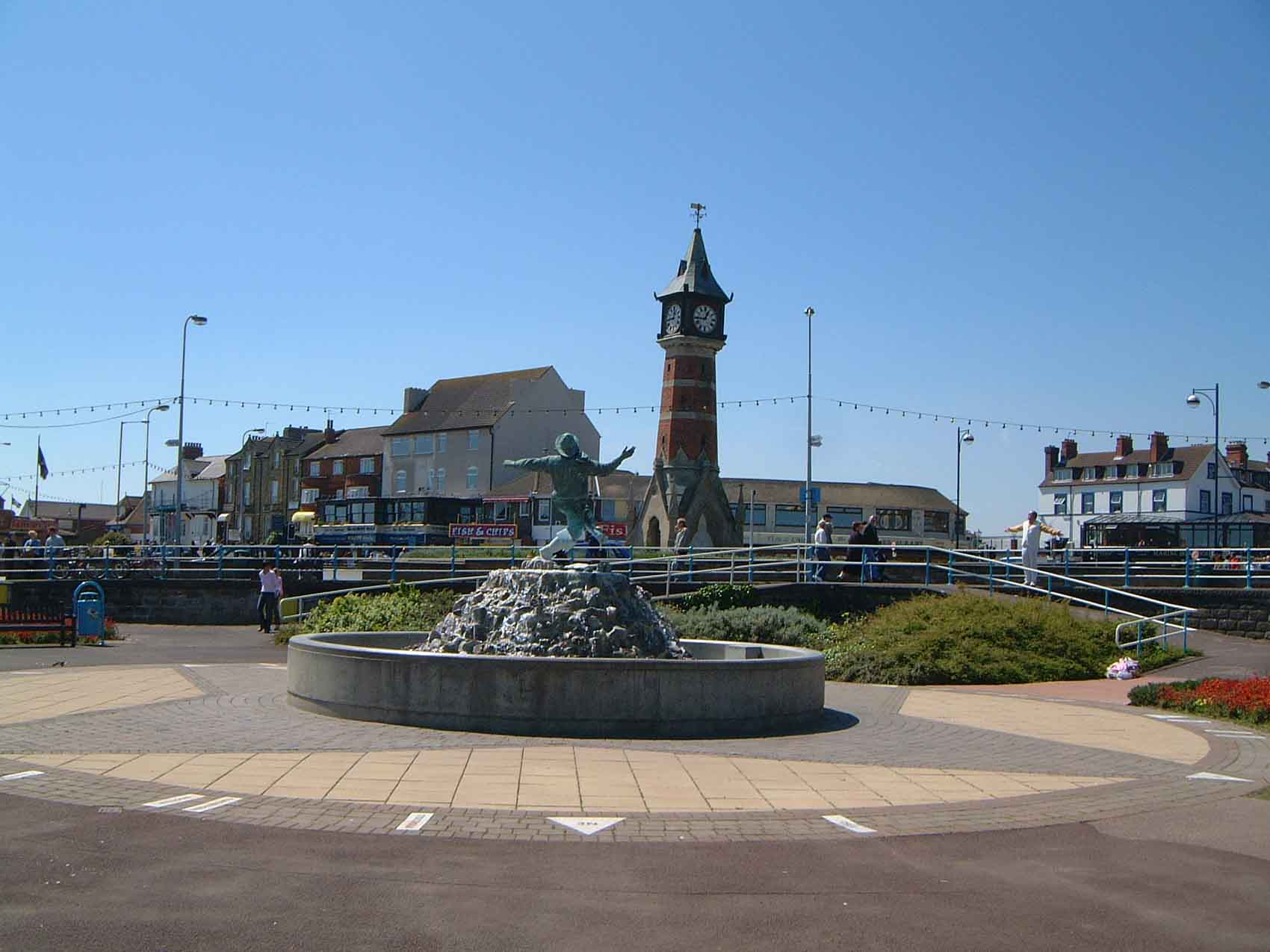
Skegness town centre, showing the clock tower and the "Jolly Fisherman" sculpture/fountain

- The main county seaside resort of Skegness with its famous Jolly Fisherman mascot and famous slogan "Skegness is so bracing", together with its neighbouring large village coastal resorts of Ingoldmells and Chapel St Leonards, provides the biggest concentration of resorts along the Lincolnshire Coast, with many large caravan and holiday sites. The resort offers many amusements, beaches, leisure activities and shops, as well as Butlins Skegness, Fantasy Island, Church Farm Museum, Natureland Seal Sanctuary, Skegness Stadium, Skegness Pier and several well-known local golf courses. There are good road, bus and rail links to the rest of the county.
- The second largest group of resorts along the coast is composed of the seaside towns of Mablethorpe and Sutton-on-Sea, famous for its golden sands, and the neighbouring village resort of Trusthorpe. This area also offers leisure activities and has large caravan and holiday sites. The area is less developed, with fewer amusement arcades and nightclubs, and poorer road links to the rest of the county; but the area offers a more traditional seaside setting.
- The third group of resorts includes the seaside town of Cleethorpes and the large village resort of Humberston within North East Lincolnshire. It has the Cleethorpes Coast Light Railway and Cleethorpes Pier, along with golf courses and caravan and holiday sites, whilst it is also the former site of Pleasure Island Family Theme Park. Cleethorpes is well served by road and rail; it is easily accessible from the M180 and the TransPennine Express route to Manchester.

Nature is an attraction for many tourists: the south-east of the county is mainly fenland that attracts many species of birds, as do the national nature reserves at Gibraltar Point, Saltfleetby-Theddlethorpe and Donna Nook, which also contains a large grey seal colony which is popular with visitors.

The market towns of the Lincolnshire Wolds, Louth, Alford, Horncastle, Caistor and Spilsby are also attractive, with several having historically important buildings, such as Alford Manor House, St James' Church, Louth and Bolingbroke Castle. The Wolds are popular for cycling and walking, with regular events such as the Lincolnshire Wolds Walking Festival.

The city of Lincoln is home to many tourist attractions including Lincoln Castle, Lincoln Cathedral, The Engine Shed, Steep Hill, International Bomber Command Centre and Guildhall and Stonebow among other historical landmarks and listed buildings. The city is one of the many tourist centres in the East Midlands Region.

== Culture ==
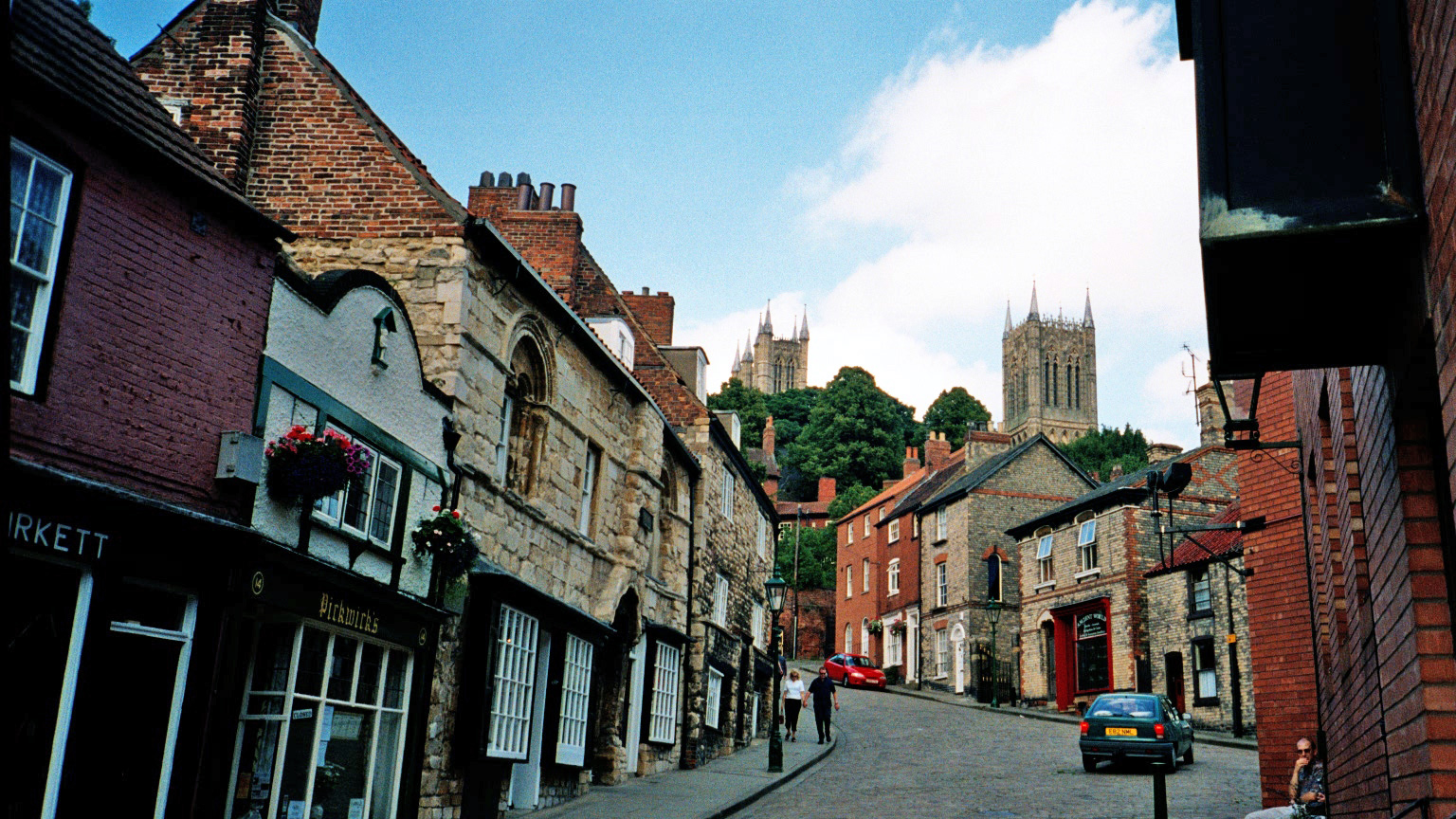
A view up 'Steep Hill' towards the historic quarter of Bailgate in Lincoln

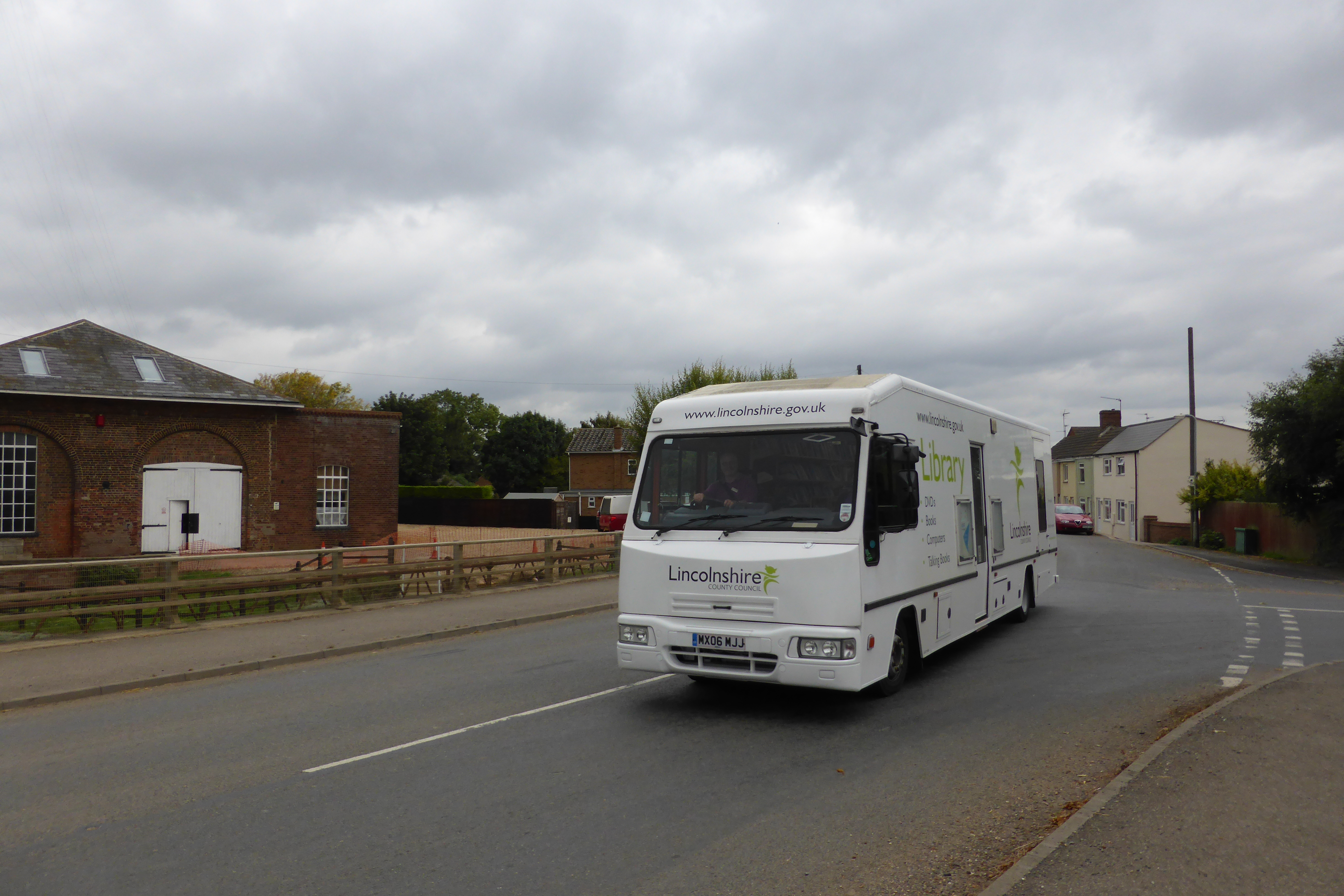
Lincolnshire mobile library at Pode Hole. Lincolnshire County Council operate five routes, covering small villages in this large, sparse, county. Each location is visited once a month.

Lincolnshire has a rustic culture. Due to the large distances between the towns, many villages have remained very self-contained, with many still having shops, pubs, local halls and local chapels and churches, offering a variety of social activities for residents. Fishing (in the extensive river and drainage system in the fens) and shooting are popular activities. A lot of the culture in Lincoln itself is based upon its history. Lincoln Museum is an archaeological museum and art gallery in Lincoln. Lincoln Cathedral also plays a large part in Lincoln's culture, hosting many events throughout the year, from concert recitals to indoor food markets.

A Lincolnshire tradition was that front doors were used for only three things: a new baby, a bride, and a coffin.

=== Urban areas ===
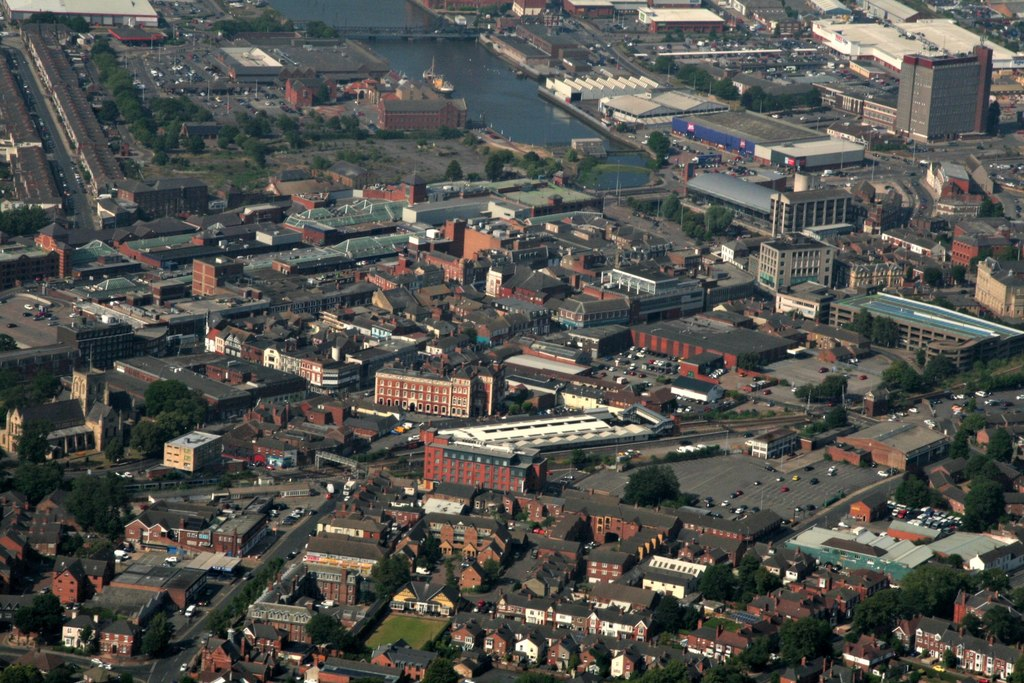
Grimsby aerial view

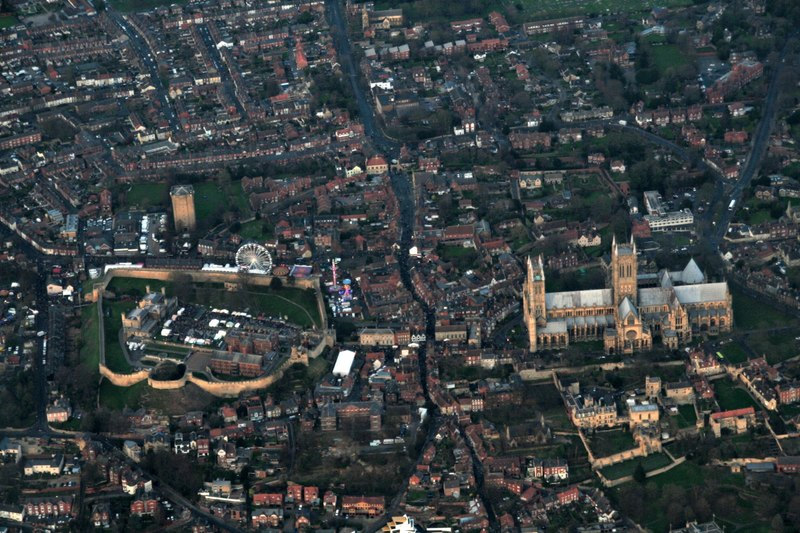
Lincoln city aerial view

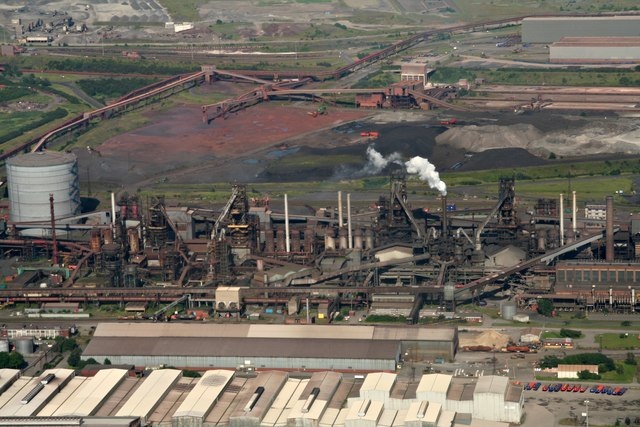
Scunthorpe Steel Works aerial

While Lincolnshire maintains a rural setting, certain parts of the county form urban areas around its larger settlements or growing centres. Such as, Grimsby-Cleethorpes form the largest urban area in the county with a population of 137,021. The second largest urban area is Lincoln which incorporates the town of North Hykeham and villages of Bracebridge Heath and Waddington. The population of the urban area was recorded at 129,305. Other urban areas include Scunthorpe which includes the town of Bottesford and had a population of 81,286, Grantham (46,778) Boston (45,339), Spalding (35,064), Skegness (26,065) and Gainsborough (22,913).

=== People ===
Those born in Lincolnshire are sometimes given the nickname of Yellowbellies (often spelt "Yeller Bellies", to reflect the pronunciation of the phrase by the typical Lincolnshire farmer). The origin of this term is debated but is most commonly believed to derive from the uniform of the 10th Regiment of Foot (later the Lincolnshire Regiment) which featured yellow facings. For this reason, the coat of arms of Lincolnshire County Council is supported by two officers of the regiment.

=== Local dialect ===
In common with most other Northern and Midlands dialects in England, "flat" a is preferred, i.e. /bæθ/ over /bɑːθ/, and also traditionally in words like 'water', pronounced /ˈwætər/ watter (though such a pronunciation is rarely heard nowadays). Similarly, /ʌ/ is usually replaced by /ʊ/. Features rather more confined to Lincolnshire include:

- Elaboration of Received Pronunciation English /eɪ/ or /iː/ into a complex triphthong approximating, and often transcribed -air- or -yair-. For example: 'mate' [m(j)ɛːət]; 'beast' [b(j)ɛːəst]; tates (potatoes) [t(j)ɛːəts].
- An equivalent elaboration of standard English /oʊ/ – commonly [oː] in Northern England – into -ooa-. For example, 'boat' [bʊːət].
- Insertion of an extra schwa into the standard English diphthong /aʊ/.
- Vocabulary: 'duck' as a term of endearment or informal address, 'mardy' meaning upset or angry, mowt (pronounced like 'mout') for 'might', while as a substitute for standard English 'until', frit meaning frightened, grufty meaning dirty or disgusting, and the inimitable salutation now then!? (hello), sometimes written nairn to reflect pronunciation.
- In the north-east of the county, around Grimsby and Immingham, the nurse-square merger can be heard, as is also the case along the east coast of Yorkshire and also in Liverpool. Words that take /ɜː/ in RP take /ɛː/ in these areas.

Lincolnshire has its own dialect "champion", a farmer from the village of Minting called Farmer Wink (real name Robert Carlton), who has produced videos about rural life, narrated in his broad Lincolnshire accent. A resident of Woodhall Spa has published a dictionary of words once prevalent in parts of the county.

=== Music ===
"The Lincolnshire Poacher", a folksong, is the country's best-known melody and almost its unofficial anthem. It describes the delights of nocturnal poaching. It was the regimental quick march of the 10th Regiment of Foot and its successors the Royal Lincolnshire Regiment and the 2nd Battalion Royal Anglian Regiment, who are known as "the Poachers".

Lincolnshire was historically associated with the Lincolnshire bagpipes, instruments derided as coarse and unpleasant in contemporary literature, but noted as very popular in the county. The last player, John Hunsley of Middle Manton, died in 1851, and since then the instrument has been extinct.

The Australian composer Percy Grainger made what are thought to be the first recordings of British Folksongs between 1906 and 1908 in Lincolnshire using a wax Phonograph Cylinder. These are now housed in the British Library. They included songs sung by Joseph Taylor of Saxby-All-Saints who became the first folk singer to be commercially recorded and whose rendition of Brigg Fair inspired classical works by Grainger and Frederick Delius. In 1937, Grainger wrote his Lincolnshire Posy for wind band. The piece is a compilation of folk songs ("bunch of wildflowers") collected by the composer in and around the county of Lincolnshire. Ralph Vaughan Williams was a frequent guest at Gunby Hall. The manuscript of his collected folksong "Daffodils" is in their collection.

Several composers have lived and worked in the county. William Byrd was organist and master of the choristers at Lincoln Cathedral from 1563 to 1572. John Taverner was listed as a lay clerk at Tattershall Collegiate Church in 1525 and also sang at St Botolph's Church, Boston under whose famous "stump" he is presumed to be buried. Thomas Linley, composer, a friend of Mozart, drowned in the lake at Grimsthorpe Castle near Bourne in 1778. Nicholas Maw was born in Grantham and Peter Seabourne lives in East Kirkby.

=== Food ===
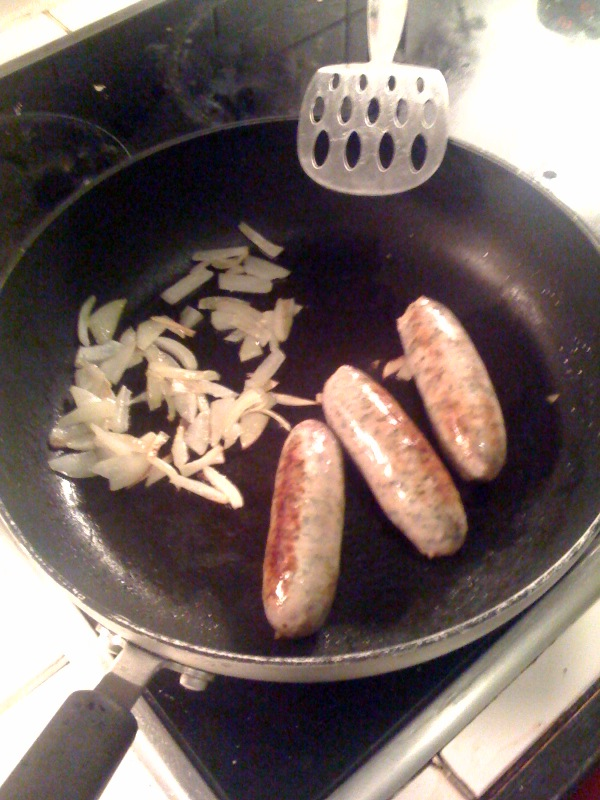
Lincolnshire sausages

Lincolnshire has a number of local dishes:

- Stuffed chine – this is salted neck-chine of a pig taken from between the shoulder blades, salted for up to ten months and stuffed with parsley (other ingredients are normally kept secret), and served cold.
- Haslet – a type of pork loaf, also flavoured with sage (pronounced HAYSS-let or AYSS-let in Lincolnshire but HAZ-let in many other parts of the country).
- Lincolnshire sausages – most butchers in Lincolnshire have their own secret recipe for these and a competition is held each year to judge the best sausages in the county. Traditional Lincolnshire sausages are made entirely from minced pork, stale bread crumb (rusk is used nowadays) pepper, sage and salt. The skins should be natural casings which are made from the intestines of either sheep or pig.
- Pork pies – the same pork butchers will take a pride in their unique recipe for pork pies.
- Giblet pie.
- Mutton stuffed with oysters.
- Plum bread – as with plum pudding, plum refers to dried fruit, namely currants, raisins and sultanas, sometimes soaked in tea.
- Grantham Gingerbread – a hard white ginger biscuit.
- Lincolnshire Poacher cheese – a cheddar-style cheese produced in Alford. Lincolnshire Poacher has won numerous awards over the years including Supreme Champion at the 1996/7 British Cheese Awards and Best British Cheese at the World Cheese awards in 2001/2.
- Batemans ales – a beer brewed in Wainfleet and served in many pubs in the county and further afield.
- There are several small breweries.
- Grimsby is renowned for its fishing industry, and historically Grimsby Fish has carried a premium price. Since the decline of the fishing industry following entry to the European Economic Community in the 1970s this is no longer the case, with the majority of fish sold at the town's fish market being brought overland from other ports. However, Grimsby Fish is still a recognised product, one associated with a particular area that specialises in and has expertise in a particular trade (cf Sheffield steel). In 2009 smoked fish from the town was granted Protected Geographical Indication by the European Union, reflecting the unique smoking methods used by certain local fish companies.

Craft chocolatiers can be found throughout the county, such as Hansens in Folkingham. In 2013 Redstar Chocolate's "Duffy's Venezuela Ocumare Milk" won a gold medal as best bean-to-bar. The factory is in Cleethorpes.

=== Annual events ===
Every year the Lincolnshire Agricultural Society, founded in 1869, stages the Lincolnshire Agricultural Show. It is held on the Wednesday and Thursday of the last whole week of June at its showground at Grange de Lings, a few miles north of Lincoln on the A15. The show was first held here in 1958. First held around the year 1884, it is one of the largest agricultural shows in the country, and is attended by around 100,000 people over its two days. The showground is in regular use throughout the year for a wide range of other events and functions.

Smaller local agricultural shows, such as the Heckington Show can still be found. Corby Glen sheep fair has been held since 1238.

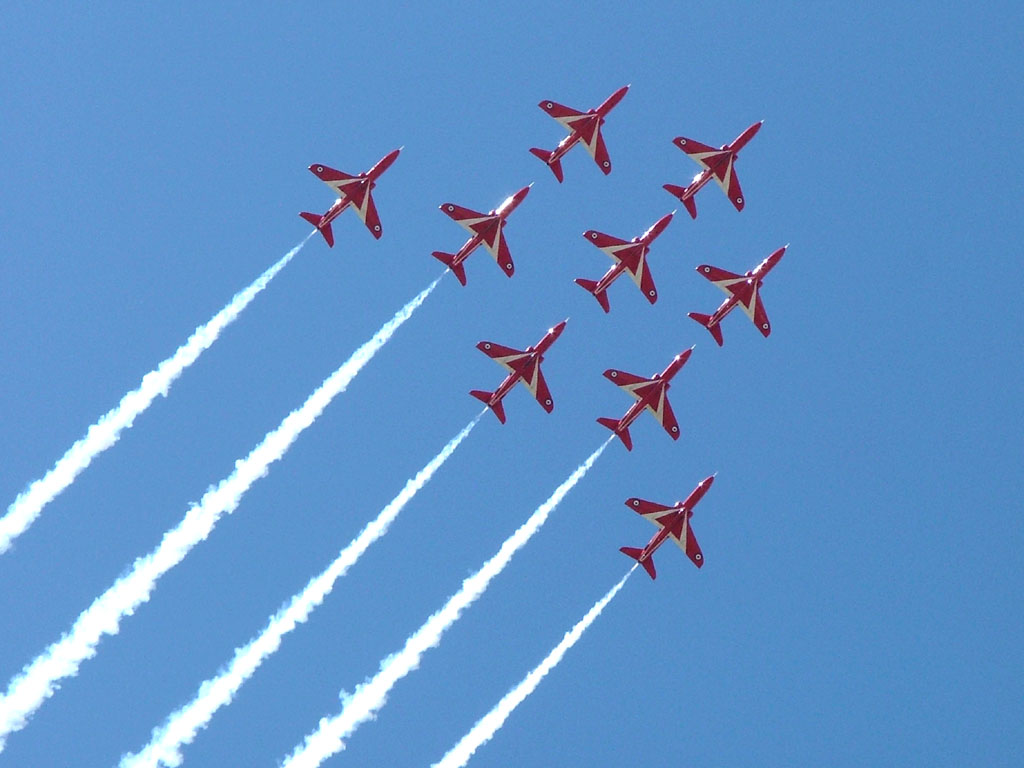
The Red Arrows, based at RAF Waddington near Lincoln are a popular attraction at the Waddington Air Show.

Each year RAF Waddington is the home to the RAF International Waddington Air Show. The two-day event attracts around 150,000 people and usually takes place during the first weekend of July. Since its inception over 35 countries have participated, with aircraft from around the globe attending the Lincolnshire Base. Beginning 2017, the event will be held at nearby RAF Scampton.

On the Monday before Easter, an unusual auction takes place in Bourne to let the grazing rights of the Whitebread Meadow. Bidding takes place while two boys race toward the Queen's Bridge in Eastgate, the end of which dash is equivalent to the falling of the gavel. The whole affair dates back to the 1742 will of William Clay.

The Haxey Hood village competition takes place every January, as it has for over 700 years.

Stamford's Mid-Lent fair sees showmen converge on the town the week after Mothering Sunday, with rides and sideshows filling Broad Street, the Sheepmarket and the Meadows for a week. Stalls selling Grantham gingerbread and nougat are a traditional feature. The following week sees them in Grantham, on the way north for the Summer. Roger Tuby brings a small funfair to Bourne and then to Spalding in Spring and returns in Autumn at the end of the season.

The villages of Tetford and Salmonby hold an annual Scarecrow Festival in May every year.

The Belchford Downhill Challenge which is held every two years: soapbox racers race down the hill at up to 30 km/h. The turnout has been up to 1,000.

Lincoln Christmas Market, was a street market held throughout the historic area of the city at the start of December, it was one of the largest Christmas markets in Europe, attracting over 250,000 people over the four-day event. Around the same time, Christmas lights are turned on in Bourne, Sleaford, Skegness, and other towns.

Throughout the summer the Stamford Shakespeare Company presents the Bard's plays in the open-air theatre at Tolethorpe Hall, which is actually in Rutland.

The Spalding Flower Parade was held in late spring every year between 1959 and 2013. Colourful floats decorated with tulip heads competed for a cup.

The Lost Village Festival is an annual music and arts event, now held in Witham St Hughs. Founded in 2015, the festival features a diverse programme of live music, DJ sets, immersive theatre, comedy, and interactive experiences.

The Asylum Steampunk Festival, frequently referred to simply as the Steampunk Festival in Lincoln, is an annual convention and celebration of steampunk culture held in the historic Cathedral Quarter of Lincoln, England. Established in 2009, it is recognized as one of the largest steampunk gatherings in Europe. The festival usually takes place over the August Bank Holiday weekend, drawing enthusiasts from across the globe.

=== Sport ===
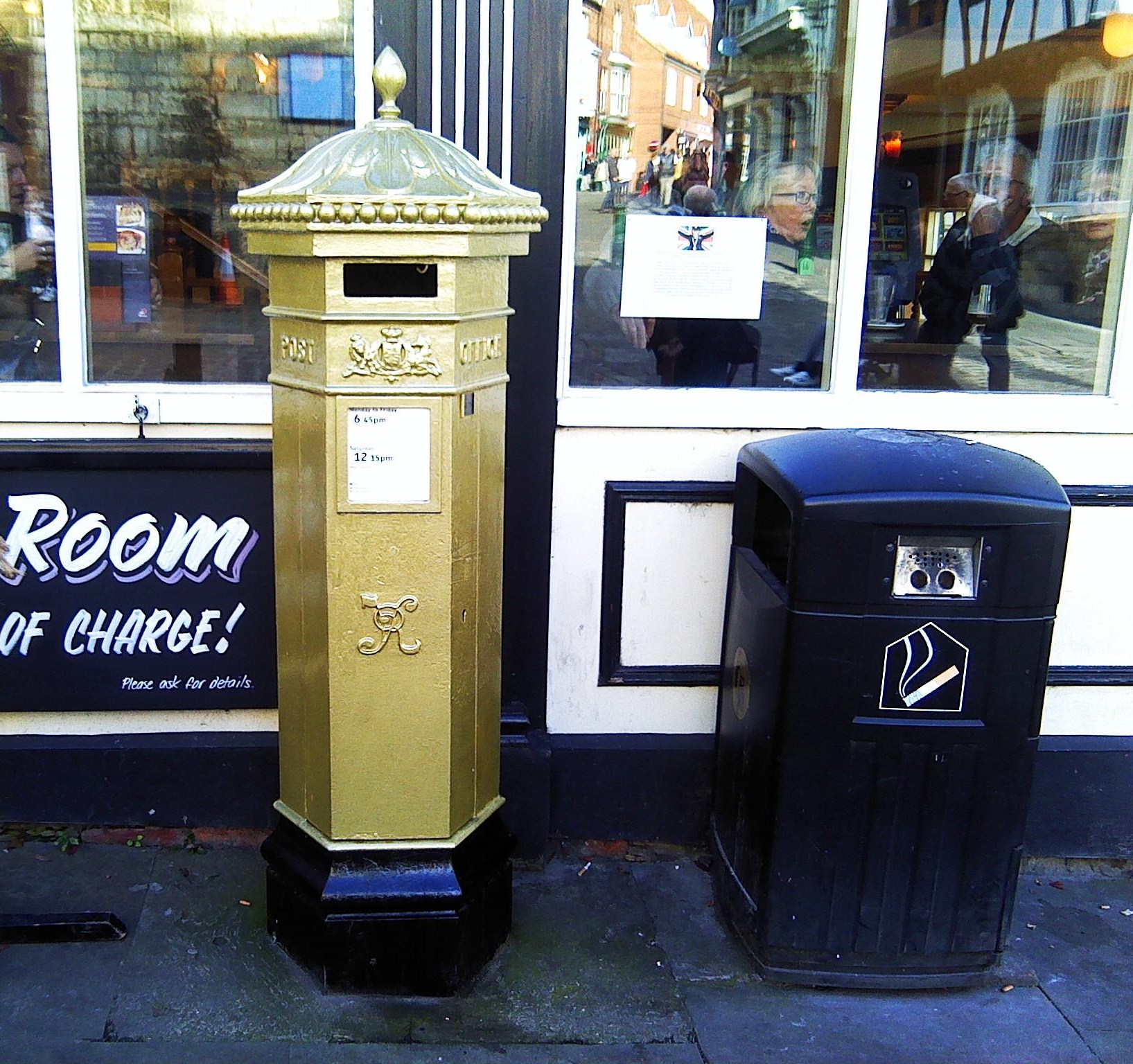
The gold Victorian-style Penfold post box in Lincoln painted in recognition of Paralympian Sophie Wells who won the gold medal in the team Equestrian event at the 2012 Paralympic Games in London. It is the only post box painted gold in the county.

The main sports played in the county are football, cricket and rugby union. Lincolnshire does not have a high sporting profile, mainly due to the lack of facilities and high-profile football teams. Probably the most well-known sporting venues in Lincolnshire are Cadwell Park near Louth, where a round of the British Motorbike Championship is held on the last Monday of August every year and the racecourse at Market Rasen

- Two teams from Lincolnshire play in the Football League: Lincoln City play in the EFL Championship and Grimsby Town play in League Two. In non-league football, Boston United and Scunthorpe United play in the National League, and Gainsborough Trinity play in the Northern Premier League. A meeting between any of these clubs is a Lincolnshire derby; the most prominent meeting, having happened across four of the top five tiers of English football, is Lincoln City vs Grimsby Town.
- In cricket Lincolnshire are a minor county and play in the Minor Counties Championship.
- In hockey Lindum Hockey Club play in the north of Lincoln.
- Scunthorpe Rugby Club are the most notable rugby union team from Lincolnshire, and will play in the fifth level of the English league system in the 2017–18 season. Other notable teams include Market Rasen and Louth RUFC, Lincoln RFC, and Boston RFC.
- Lincolnshire is home to one racecourse, at Market Rasen.
- Cadwell Park is the only motor-racing course in Lincolnshire. There is a speedway track in Scunthorpe, home of the Scunthorpe Scorpions, and stock-car racing at a stadium at Orby, near Skegness.
- Lincolnshire has an American football club, the Lincolnshire Bombers, which has existed in its current guise since 2005.
- Lincolnshire is home to the UK roller derby team, the Lincolnshire Bombers Roller Girls, which is sponsored by Motörhead.
- Lincolnshire is home to Lincolnshire Lions Rugby League who run an Open Age Men's team, playing in the Midlands Merit League since 2022.

=== Symbols ===
The flag of the historic county of Lincolnshire

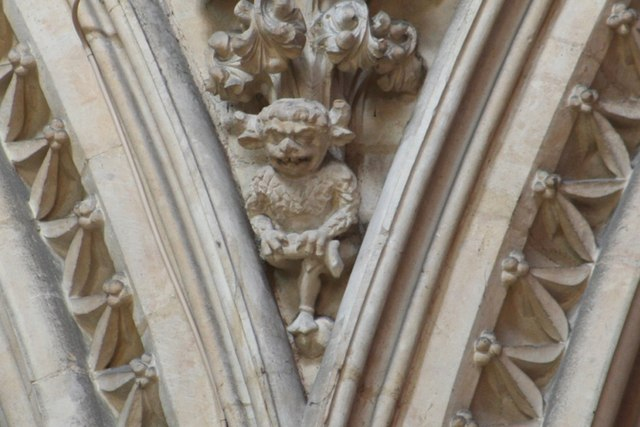
The Lincoln Imp high above the choir on the southern side of Lincoln Cathedral

The unofficial anthem of the county is the traditional folk song, "The Lincolnshire Poacher", which dates from around 1776. A version of the song was the theme for BBC Radio Lincolnshire for many years.

According to a 2002 marketing campaign by the charity Plantlife, the county flower of Lincolnshire is the common dog-violet.

In August 2005, BBC Radio Lincolnshire and Lincolnshire Life magazine launched a vote for a flag of Lincolnshire to represent the county. Six competing designs were voted upon by locals and the winning submission was unveiled in October 2005. Lincoln has its own flag – St George's flag with a Fleur-de-Lys.

The Lincoln Imp has symbolised cathedral, city and county for many years. In 2006 it was replaced as the brand of Lincolnshire County Council by the stylised version seen on the header here which has lost even the unique pose of the carving.

== Media ==
=== Press ===
The county is home to one daily newspaper, the Grimsby Telegraph which is published in the town and whose circulation area ostensibly covers North East Lincolnshire, although it reaches as far south as Louth and Alford and as west as Brigg.

There are two further weekly papers which used to be published daily until 2011; the Lincolnshire Echo is published weekly from Lincoln and covers the majority of the county reaching as far north as Louth, and the Scunthorpe Telegraph which covers northern Lincolnshire. All three are ultimately owned by Reach plc.

There are also a number of weekly papers serving individual towns published in the county by Iliffe Media. One of these, the Stamford Mercury, claims to be Britain's oldest newspaper, although it is now a typical local weekly and no longer covers stories from the whole East Midlands as the archived copies did.

=== Television ===
With the exception of a small area to the south-west of the county, Lincolnshire is served from the Belmont transmitting station, receiving ITV Yorkshire and BBC Yorkshire and Lincolnshire regions. The BBC covers the county in Look North news from Hull, with input from studios in Lincoln and Grimsby. ITV provides coverage through Calendar news.

From 1959 to July 1974 ITV programmes were provided by Anglia Television, based in Norwich with news offices in Grimsby. Following a transmitter change, ITV services were provided by Yorkshire Television. This company kept open the offices in Grimsby and opened further facilities in Lincoln, although both of these closed in the mid-1990s.

South-west Lincolnshire receives BBC East Midlands and ITV Central which are broadcast from the Waltham transmitting station. Many villages just west of the Lincoln Cliff cannot get a signal from Belmont due to shadowing and instead get their TV from Emley Moor transmitting station near Huddersfield.

=== Radio ===
BBC local radio is provided by BBC Radio Lincolnshire and, in the north of the county, BBC Radio Humberside. Commercial local radio serving the county includes Greatest Hits Radio Yorkshire, Heart East, Hits Radio East Yorkshire & North Lincolnshire, Hits Radio Lincolnshire, Capital Yorkshire (in the north of the county) and Smooth East Midlands. The community radio stations in the county are Endeavour FM in Boston; TMCR 95.3 covering Epworth and Isle of Axholme; and LCR 103.6 in Lincoln.

== Military ==
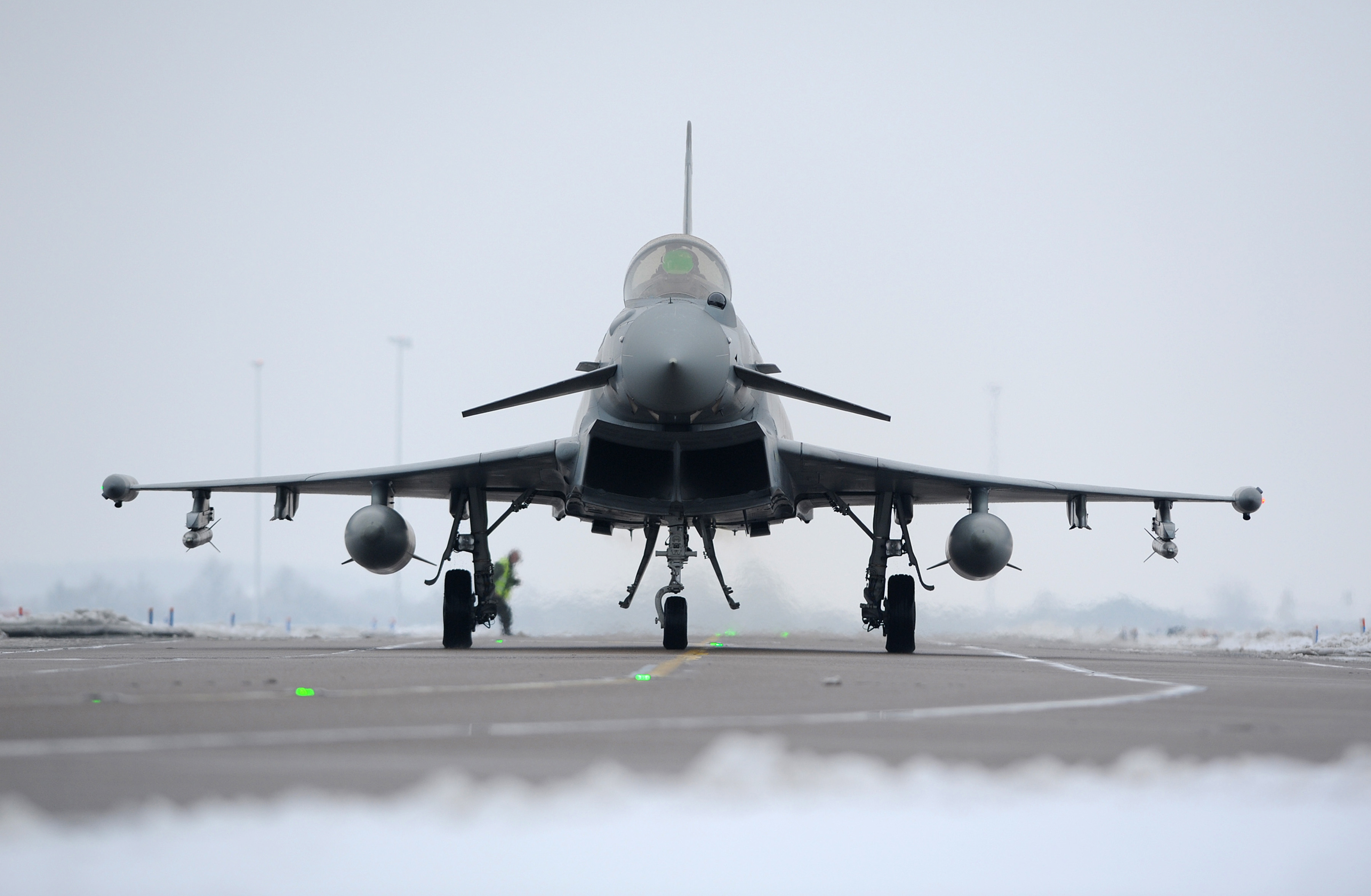
Typhoon FGR4 aircraft, based at RAF Coningsby

=== Air ===
Because of its flat geography and low population density, Lincolnshire is an ideal place for airfields, and the Air Ministry built prolifically with the county hosting nearly seventy separate air bases. It became known as "bomber county". Since the end of the Second World War most of these airfields or stations were decommissioned, but the RAF retains a significant footprint in Lincolnshire for the air defence of the United Kingdom and aircrew training. For more information on former bases, see List of former RAF stations.

Two major front-line bases located in Lincolnshire are RAF Coningsby, which is one of only two RAF Quick Reaction Alert (QRA) Stations in the United Kingdom and home to the Eurofighter Typhoon jet fighters, and RAF Waddington, where most of the RAF's Intelligence, Surveillance, Target Acquisition and Reconnaissance aircraft are based. The Red Arrows Aerobatic Team has also been based at Waddington since October 2022 after their previous base, RAF Scampton, was closed down. Other stations in Lincolnshire include RAF Cranwell, home to all Air Force Basic Officer Training for the Royal Air Force; RAF Barkston Heath, a training airfield; and minor bases such as RAF Donna Nook and RAF Digby.

Lincolnshire is also home to two active RAF and NATO-allied air weapons training bombing ranges, located along The Wash and north Lincolnshire coastline—RAF Holbeach active since 1926 (originally part of the former RAF Sutton Bridge station) and Donna Nook. The RAF Wainfleet range was decommissioned in 2010.

=== Army ===
The Army runs Sobraon Barracks, home of 160 (Lincoln) Squadron, Royal Logistic Corps (RLC), as well as Prince William of Gloucester Barracks, Grantham, home to the national specialist logistics units. In November 2016 the Ministry of Defence announced that the Grantham site would close in 2020 but the timescale has twice been extended, latterly to 2028.

== See also ==
- Outline of England
- Custos Rotulorum of Lincolnshire – List of Keepers of the Rolls for Lincolnshire
- Earl of Lincoln is a title that has been created eight times in the Peerage of England and is currently represented.
- High Sheriff of Lincolnshire
- Lincolnshire (UK Parliament constituency) List of MPs for the Lincolnshire constituency
- Lincs Wind Farm
- Lincolnshire lists:
- Bridges and viaducts
- Churches
- Civil parishes
- Companies (current and former)
- Forests and woodland
- Historical endowed schools
- Monastic houses
- Museums
- Parliamentary constituencies
- People
- Places
- Public art
- Roman sites
- Schools
- Watermills
- Waterways
- Windmills
- Lord Lieutenant of Lincolnshire
- Stamford Senior Youth Theatre
- 1185 East Midlands earthquake

== Bibliography ==
- Foster, C. W.; Longley, Thomas, eds. (1924). The Lincolnshire Domesday and Lindsey Survey. Annual works of the society. Vol. 19. Horncastle: Lincoln Record Society.
