= List of watermills in Lincolnshire =

This is a list of Watermills within the county of Lincolnshire.

Name	River	Location	Date	Grade	Notes	Image	Ref
Aswardby Mill	River Lymn	Sausthorpe	?	?			
Alvingham Mill	River Lud	Alvingham	?	II*	Intact		
Claythorpe Mill	Great Eau	Aby	?	?			
Cogglesford Mill	River Slea	Sleaford	?	II	Now a free visitor centre with tea room and gift shop. Owned and managed by North Kesteven District Council.		
Fulsby Mill	River Bain	Fulsby	?	?	No longer exists		
Harrowby Mill	River Witham	Manthorpe	1702	II	Only millhouse survives. Now private residence.		
Kirkby on Bain Mill	River Bain	Kirkby on Bain			Private residence. Wheel still intact. Now known as The Old Watermill.		
Londonthorpe Mill	River Witham	Manthorpe	18th Century	II*	Intact. Also (currently) known as Manthorpe Mill.		
Manthorpe Mill	River Witham	Manthorpe	?	?	No longer exists		
Partney Mill	River Lymn	Spilsby	?	?	No longer exists		
Slate Mill	River Witham	Grantham	?	?	No longer exists		
Tattershall Mill	River Bain	Coningsby	?	?	No longer exists		
Tealby Thorpe Mill	River Rase	Tealby	?	?			
Tetford Water Mill	River Lymn	Tetford	?	II			
Thimbleby Mill	River Bain	Horncastle	?	?			
Victoria Mill	River Bain	Horncastle	?	?	Now business premises		
Withern Mill	Great Eau	Withern	?	?			
