= Sally Matthews (sculptor) =

English sculptor

Sally Matthews (born 1964) is an English sculptor, known particularly for sculptures of animals, which stand in locations in the UK.

== Life and works ==
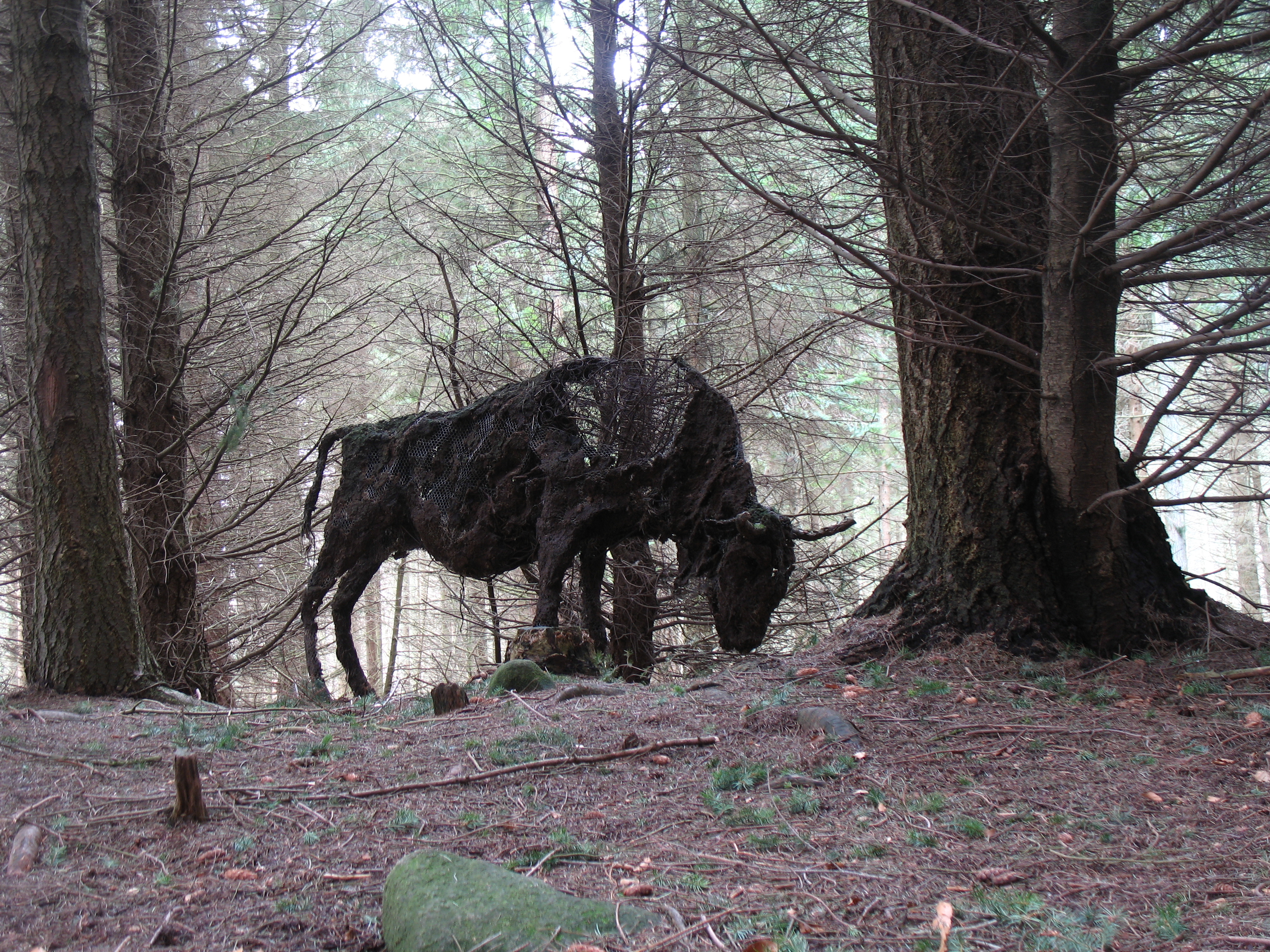
"Bison" (1994) in Tyrebagger Forest, Aberdeen

Matthews was born in Tamworth, Staffordshire, and in 1986 gained a first-class degree in fine art at Loughborough College of Art. She received bursaries from Northern Arts in 1989 and 1992, and residencies include Grizedale Forest. Many works have been created by commission.

Matthews has written: "My work is in praise of animals, to remind us of our spiritual and physical need for them and the incalculable example their nature provides us with." The materials used "all have a relevance to the subject I am making. They usually have a texture and colour that means no surface has to be added." They "are often suggested by the subject, or the place I am working in."

Her works include the following:

Sculptures in Grizedale Forest in Cumbria are "Wild Boar" (1988), "Wolves" (1990) and "A Cry in the Wilderness" (1993). Matthews has written that "such a place helps my work to be seen not as sculpture but as animals connected to their landscape".

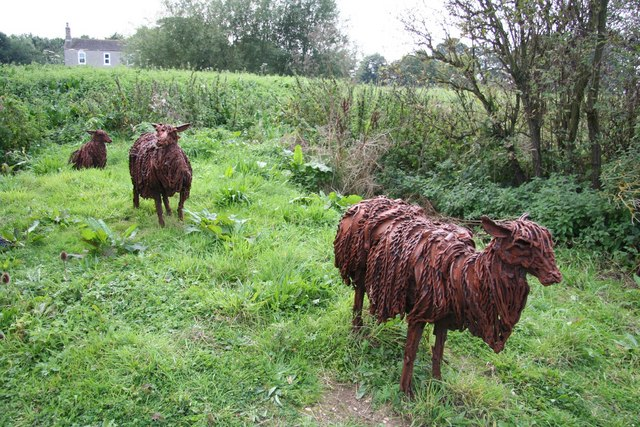
Lincolnshire Longwool sheep sculptures near Stixwould, Lincolnshire

Three sculptures of Irish elk (1994), commissioned by Sustrans, are in Snibston Colliery Park, Leicestershire. They are made of welded mining artefacts.

Three sculptures of Lincoln Longwool sheep are near Stixwould, Lincolnshire. They are made from welded scraps of iron and chains. The sculptures were funded by the European Union, Lincolnshire County Council and the East Midlands development agency.

"Donkey Crossing" (c. 2010) consists of three bronze sculptures of donkeys by Selworthy Road, Weston-super-Mare, Somerset. It was commissioned by Rhyne's art project "Revealing the Hidden". An inscription tells that after working hard through the summer season on the beach, the donkeys crossed here on their way to local pasture for the winter.
