= Stamford Senior Youth Theatre =

Stamford Senior Youth Theatre (SSYT)
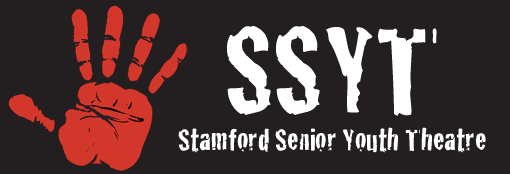
- Stamford Senior Youth Theatre Logo
- Formation: 09, 2007
- Type: Theatre group
- Location: Stamford
- Members: 24
- Notable members: Luke Pasqualino; Conor Baum; Andrew Leeks
- Website: http://www.stamfordartscentre.com

Stamford Senior Youth Theatre "(SSYT)" is a theatre company based in Stamford.

The company devises and produces a new original performance annually, usually written by the company's artistic director. The company operates on a yearly timeline which runs from September to July. The devised performances are debuted in the resident theatre and then toured throughout local schools and theatres. SSYT resides at the Stamford Arts Centre.

The company is a member of the National Association of Youth Theatres (NAYT) and attends the Middlesbrough Youth Drama Festival annually.

== History ==
Mary Benzies started running the Senior Youth Theatre in 2007, in the first year produced 'Multiplex' by Christopher William Hill about staff at a multiplex cinema. This was a massive success at the box office and got rave reviews from local news. This led to an increase of interest from young people who wished to get into performing arts. Mary chose to audition members for the 2008 Group instead of just letting everybody join. This meant that only selected members who were interested and dedicated to producing innovative, creative theatre would be accepted, leading to a massive boost in the professionalism and standard or performance by the company.

== Funding ==
SSYT is primarily funded by South Kesteven District Council and its company's members.

== Company management ==
=== Class teachers ===
- Mary Benzies
  Company Director (2007–Present)
- Claudia Calardo
  Choreographer (2009–Present)

=== Creative team ===
- Adrian Hill
  Technical Director (2007–Present)

== Notable members ==
Previous notable members of SSYT:

Name	Year Started	Year Ended	Characters played
Luke Pasqualino	2007	2008	Multiplex
Andrew Leeks	2008	Present	Multiplex; Dress up Day 'Talkease' - Simon
Conor Baum	2008	2010	Multiplex; Dress up Day 'Talkease' - Baron Armand Korkorai

== Previous productions ==
- Multiplex (2008)

By Christopher William Hill

- DNA

Unknown Writer

- Dress Up Day (2009)

By Mary Benzies

- TalkEase (2010)

By Mary Benzies

- Hang On (2011)

By Mary Benzies

- Torchbearer (2012)

By Mary Benzies
