= List of museums in Lincolnshire =

This list of museums in Lincolnshire, England, contains museums which are defined for this context as institutions (including nonprofit organizations, government entities, and private businesses) that collect and care for objects of cultural, artistic, scientific, or historical interest and make their collections or related exhibits available for public viewing. Also included are non-profit art galleries and university art galleries. Museums that exist only in cyberspace (i.e., virtual museums) are not included.

Name	Image	Town/City	Region	Type	Summary
20-21 Visual Arts Centre		Scunthorpe	North Lincolnshire	Art	visual arts centre
50 and 61 Squadron Museum		Lincoln	Lincoln	Military	History of No. 50 Squadron RAF and No. 61 Squadron RAF and RAF Skellingthorpe in World War II
Alford Manor House		Alford	East Lindsey	Historic house	17th-century thatched manor house, gardens, art gallery
Anderby Drainage Museum		Anderby	East Lindsey	Technology	, located in a drainage board pumping station, includes engines and tools
Ayscoughfee Hall Museum		Spalding	South Holland	Historic house	15th-century medieval Tudor merchant's house, includes an art gallery, gardens
Battle of Britain Memorial Flight Visitor Centre		Coningsby	East Lindsey	Aviation	Tours of historic World War II aircraft used in flight shows
Baysgarth House Museum		Barton-upon-Humber	North Lincolnshire	Local	Local history, culture
Belton House		Belton	South Kesteven	Historic house	Operated by the National Trust, 17th-century Restoration style country house with opulent decor, silverware, paintings, gardens
Boston Guildhall		Boston	Boston	Local	History of the medieval guildhall, courtroom and the town, also art exhibits
Bourne Heritage Centre		Bourne	South Kesteven	Local	Located at Baldock's Mill, local history, culture, auto racing driver Raymond Mays, fashion designer Charles Frederick Worth
Browne's Hospital		Stamford	South Kesteven	History	Medieval almshouse, tours by appointment
Bubble Car Museum		Cranwell	North Kesteven	Transportation	collection of bubble cars and microcars, 1950s memorabilia, Bakelite items
Burgh le Marsh Heritage Centre		Burgh Le Marsh	East Lindsey	Mill	also known as Dobson's Mill, early-19th-century tower windmill, exhibits of local history
Burgh Museum		Burgh Le Marsh	East Lindsey	Local	, local history
Burton Fen Collection		Pinchbeck	South Holland	Music	music hall with pipe organ collection, movie posters and old advertisements
Caistor Arts & Heritage Centre		Caistor	West Lindsey	Local	local history, includes the Caistor Library, exhibition space
Chain Bridge Forge		Spalding	South Holland	Technology	, living museum that provides blacksmithing demonstrations, local history, innovation 3D printing and scanning
Cleethorpes Discovery Centre		Cleethorpes	North East Lincolnshire	Art	art exhibition gallery
Cogglesford Mill		Sleaford	North Kesteven	Mill	Late-18th-century working watermill
Cottage Museum		Woodhall Spa	East Lindsey	Local	local history, culture
Cranwell Aviation Heritage Centre		Cranwell	North Kesteven	Aviation	history of Royal Air Force College Cranwell
Discover Stamford		Stamford	South Kesteven	Local	heritage display in Stamford Library
Doddington Hall & Gardens		Doddington	Lincoln	Historic house	Late-17th-century house with Georgian interiors, collections of furniture, paintings, ceramics, textiles, porcelain, household objects, gardens
Dogdyke Steam Drainage Station		Tattershall	East Lindsey	Technology	Restored steam drainage engine and museum
Epworth Old Rectory		Epworth	North Lincolnshire	Historic house	early-18th-century Queen Anne rectory, birthplace of John Wesley and Charles Wesley, founders of Methodism
Gainsborough Old Hall		Gainsborough	West Lindsey	Historic house	Operated by English Heritage, timber-framed and brick medieval manor house
Gayton Engine Pumping Station		Theddlethorpe	East Lindsey	Technology	, 1930s pumping station with engine and exhibits about land drainage
Gordon Boswell Romany Museum		Spalding	South Holland	Transportation	Collection of Romani wagons
Grantham House		Grantham	South Kesteven	Historic house	Operated by the National Trust, townhouse reflecting different eras, open by appointment and on a limited basis, gardens
Grantham Museum		Grantham	South Kesteven	Local	Local history, culture, Sir Isaac Newton, Margaret Thatcher and the World War II raid Dambusters
Grimsby Fishing Heritage Centre		Grimsby	North East Lincolnshire	Maritime	Area 1950s fishing industry, also art exhibits
Grimsby Town Hall Time Trap Museum		Grimsby	North East Lincolnshire	Prison	local history and prison, located in town hall
Grimsthorpe Castle		Bourne	South Kesteven	Historic house	Large country estate with paintings, furniture, tapestries and objets d'art, gardens, parklands designed by Capability Brown
Haywain Farm Museum		Epworth	North Lincolnshire	Agriculture	information
Heckington Railway and Heritage Museum		Heckington	North Kesteven	Railway	Preserved Victorian railway station with artifacts, working model railways, local history displays, operated by Heckington Village Trust
Heckington Windmill		Heckington	North Kesteven	Mill	8-sailed tower windmill
Immingham Museum		Immingham	North East Lincolnshire	Railway	Great Central Railway, LNER and British Rail exhibits, building of the Immingham Dock, local history
Lincoln Castle		Lincoln	Lincoln	Multiple	Medieval castle, courtroom and prison, exhibition about Magna Carta and the Charter of the Forest
Lincoln Medieval Bishop's Palace		Lincoln	Lincoln	Historic house	Operated by English Heritage, remains of the medieval palace with visitor centre and audio tour
Lincoln Museum		Lincoln	Lincoln	Multiple	Archaeology, fine and decorative arts, contemporary visual arts in the Usher Gallery
Lincolnshire Aviation Heritage Centre		East Kirkby	East Lindsey	Aviation	History of the RAF Bomber Command in World War II
Lincolnshire Road Transport Museum		North Hykeham	North Kesteven	Transportation	vintage cars, buses and commercial vehicles, road transport history and memorabilia, model vehicles, 1950s/60s village garage workshop
Lincolnshire Wolds Railway		Ludborough	East Lindsey	Railway	Heritage railway and museum
Louth Museum		Louth	East Lindsey	Local	local history, culture, archaeology, geology, natural history
Magdalen College Museum		Wainfleet All Saints	East Lindsey	Local	information, local history, culture
Maud Foster Windmill		Boston	Boston	Mill	Seven story, five sail working windmill
Metheringham Airfield Visitor Centre		Metheringham	North Kesteven	Aviation	History of the World War II RAF 106 Bomber Squadron at RAF Metheringham
Moulton Windmill		Moulton	South Holland	Mill	Early-19th-century tower windmill
Mrs Smith's Cottage		Navenby	North Kesteven	Historic house	Early Victorian brick built cottage with few modern amenities
Museum of Lincolnshire Life		Lincoln	Lincoln	Local	Local and social history, Victorian rooms, period shop displays, exhibits about the Royal Lincolnshire Regiment and Lincolnshire Yeomanry, agriculture equipment and tools
Museum of RAF Firefighting		Awaiting new location	Lincoln	Military, Transportation	Museum containing Military Fire Engines, Civilian Fire Engines and various kinds of pumps. Museum with over 40+ vehicles dating back to wartime.
Museum of Technology		Throckenholt	South Holland	Technology	Evolution of electrical, electronic and warfare technology between the period 1850 and 1980 (Reopening anticipated in 2015 moved from Hemel Hempstead, Hertfordshire)
National Centre for Craft & Design		Sleaford	North Kesteven	Art	Contemporary craft and design centre, formerly The Hub
Natural World Centre		Thorpe on the Hill	North Kesteven	Natural history	Nature discovery centre for Whisby Nature Park
Navigation House		Sleaford	North Kesteven	Transportation	Development and heritage of the Sleaford Navigation, a 12.5 mile (20.1 km) canalisation of the River Slea
Normanby Hall Museum and Country Park		Burton upon Stather	North Lincolnshire	Multiple	Early-19th-century Regency mansion with a farming museum, Victorian walled garden, stableyard, duck ponds, deer sanctuary, miniature railway
North Ings Farm Museum		Dorrington	North Kesteven	Technology	Tractors, agricultural machinery, commercial vehicles, a narrow gauge railway, portable steam pumps, a fairground organ
North Lincolnshire Museum		Scunthorpe	North Lincolnshire	Local	Local history, culture
Owston Ferry Smithy		Owston Ferry	North Lincolnshire	Local	local history, blacksmith shop
Pinchbeck Engine		Pinchbeck	South Holland	Technology	Steam powered drainage engines
RAF Digby Sector Ops Room Museum		Digby	North Kesteven	Military	Restored World War II Sector Operations headquarters
RAF Scampton Museum		Scampton	West Lindsey	Military	history of RAF Scampton
RAF Skellingthorpe Heritage Room		Skellingthorpe	North Kesteven	Military	History of RAF Skellingthorpe
RAF Waddington Heritage Centre		Lincoln	Lincoln	Military	history and memorabilia of RAF Waddington, open by appointment
RAF Wickenby Memorial Collection		Langworth	West Lindsey	Military	history and memorabilia of RAF Wickenby
The Ropewalk		Barton-upon-Humber	North Lincolnshire	Art	Arts centre with four exhibit galleries, artist studios, museum about the former rope factory, theatre
Scawby Hall		Scawby	North Lincolnshire	Historic house	early Jacobean manor house
Sibsey Trader Mill		Sibsey	East Lindsey	Mill	Late-19th-century six-story windmill, owned by English Heritage
Spalding Flower Bulb Museum		Pinchbeck	South Holland	Agriculture	local flower bulb growing industry
St Katherine's Heritage and Cultural Centre		Lincoln	Lincoln	Local	Local heritage and culture exhibits and programs of St Catherine's, Lincoln
St Peter's Church, Barton-upon-Humber		Barton-upon-Humber	North Lincolnshire	Archaeology	Operated by English Heritage, remains and artifacts from the 10th-century Anglo-Saxon church
Tattershall Castle		Tattershall	East Lindsey	Historic house	Operated by the National Trust, 15th-century medieval castle
Thornton Abbey		Thornton Curtis	North Lincolnshire	Religious	Operated by English Heritage, gatehouse and remains of a medieval priory
Thorpe Camp Visitor Centre		Thorpe Park	East Lindsey	Military	History and artifacts of RAF Woodhall Spa in World War II and after, includes aircraft and missiles, models, dioramas, photos
Trolleybus Museum at Sandtoft		Sandtoft	North Lincolnshire	Transportation	Preserved trolleybuses, 1950s/1960s street scene and period home
The Village Church Farm		Skegness	East Lindsey	Open air	Local history, agriculture tools and equipment, traditional indigenous buildings including a cottage, 18th-century farmhouse, 19th-century stable block and cowshed
Wainfleet All Saints Magdalen Museum and Garden	Magdalen Museum Community Hub	Wainfleet All Saints	East Lindsey	Former Magdalen College School, local history, military history, school photos and exhibits, library, tea room, walled garden, car park	
Waltham Windmill		Waltham	North East Lincolnshire	Mill	Late-19th-century six-sailed windmill
Welbourn Forge		Welbourn	North Kesteven	History	information, information, working forge and blacksmith shop
Wilderspin National School		Barton-upon-Humber	North Lincolnshire	Education	life and works of education pioneer Samuel Wilderspin, recreation of his mid-19th-century classroom and a late Victorian classroom
Woolsthorpe Manor		Woolsthorpe-by-Colsterworth	South Kesteven	Historic house	Operated by the National Trust, birthplace of Sir Isaac Newton, 17th-century yeoman's farmhouse, hands-on science activities
Wrawby Windmill		Wrawby	North Lincolnshire	Mill	Mid-18th-century four-sailed windmill
Ye Olde Curiosity Museum		Mablethorpe	East Lindsey	History	information, collectibles include lampshades, old Christmas decorations and lights, kitchen and brewery memorabilia

== Defunct museums ==
- Stamford Museum, Stamford, closed in 2011
- South Lincolnshire Military Museum, Gosberton, South Holland information

== See also ==
- Category:Tourist attractions in Lincolnshire
