= Horse fair =

Event for buying and selling horses

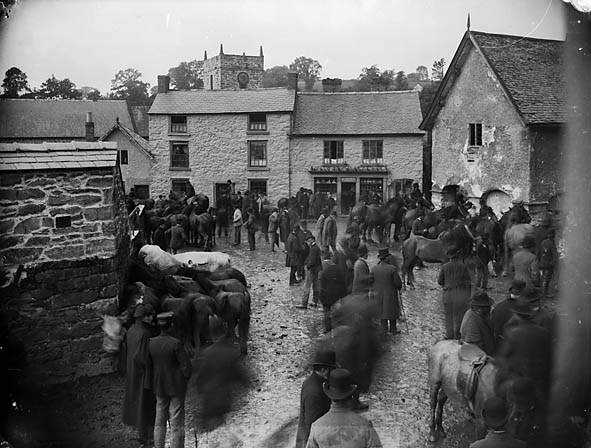
A horse fair in the village Llanrhaeadr-ym-Mochnant in Wales, c. 1885

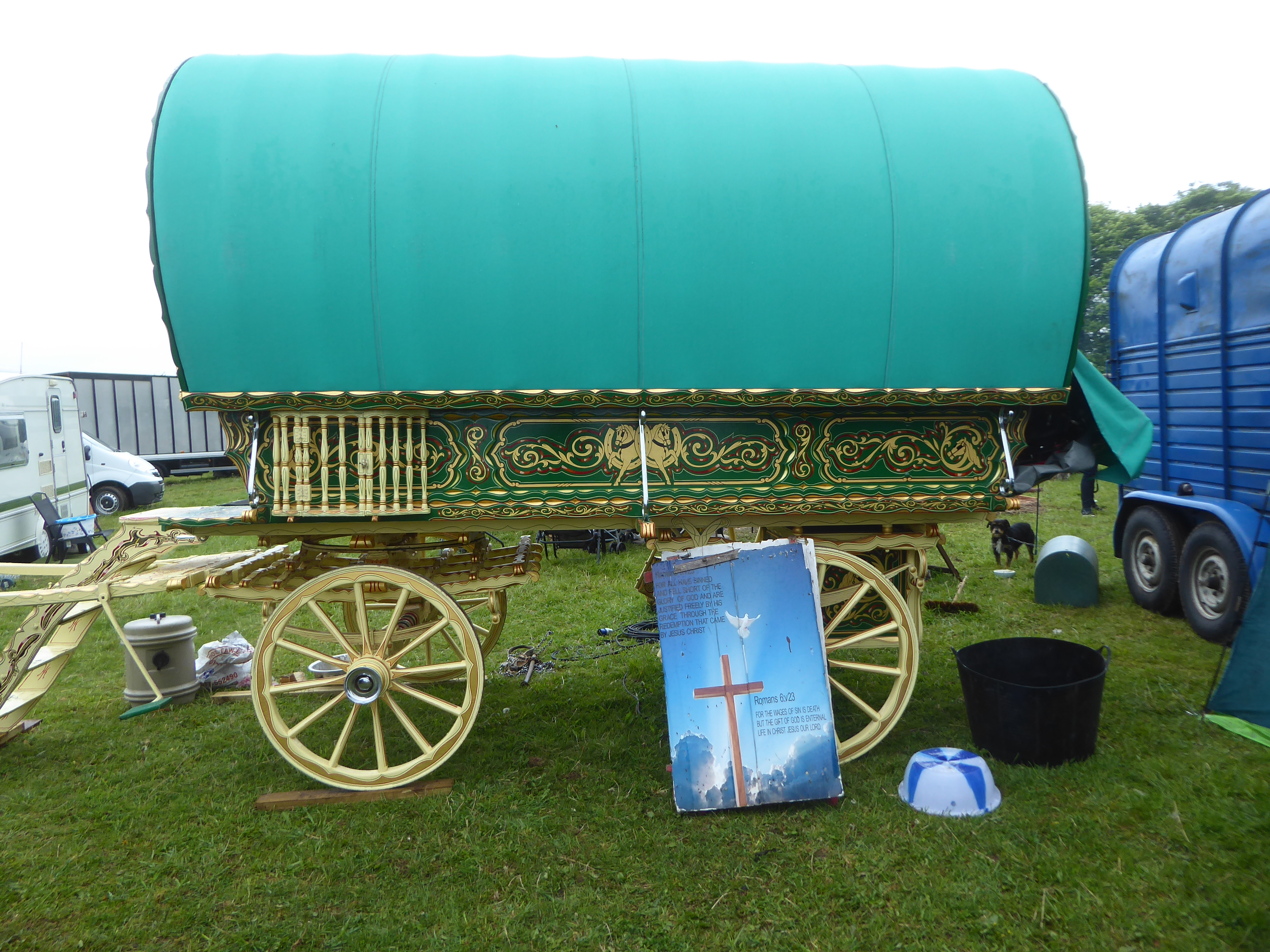
A traditional Romani vardo at Stow Horse Fair, 2019

A horse fair is a (typically annual) fair where people buy and sell horses.

In the United Kingdom there are many fairs which are traditionally attended by Romani people and travellers who converge at the fairs to buy and sell horses, meet with friends and relations and to celebrate their music, history and folklore.

Many horse fairs are centuries old, dating back to the 16th century, such as the Appleby Horse Fair and The Great October Fair in Ballinasloe.

== List of important horse fairs in the United Kingdom ==
- Appleby Horse Fair, Appleby-in-Westmorland, Cumbria
- Ballyclare May Fair, Ballyclare, County Antrim
- Barnet Fair, Barnet, London
- Brigg Fair, Brigg, Lincolnshire
- Dartmoor Drift, Dartmoor, Devon
- Horncastle Horse Fair, Lincolnshire
- Lee Gap, Yorkshire
- Stow Fair, Stow-on-the-Wold, Gloucestershire
- Wickham Horse Fair, Wickham, Hampshire
- Widecombe Fair, Widecombe-in-the-Moor, Devon

== Gallery ==
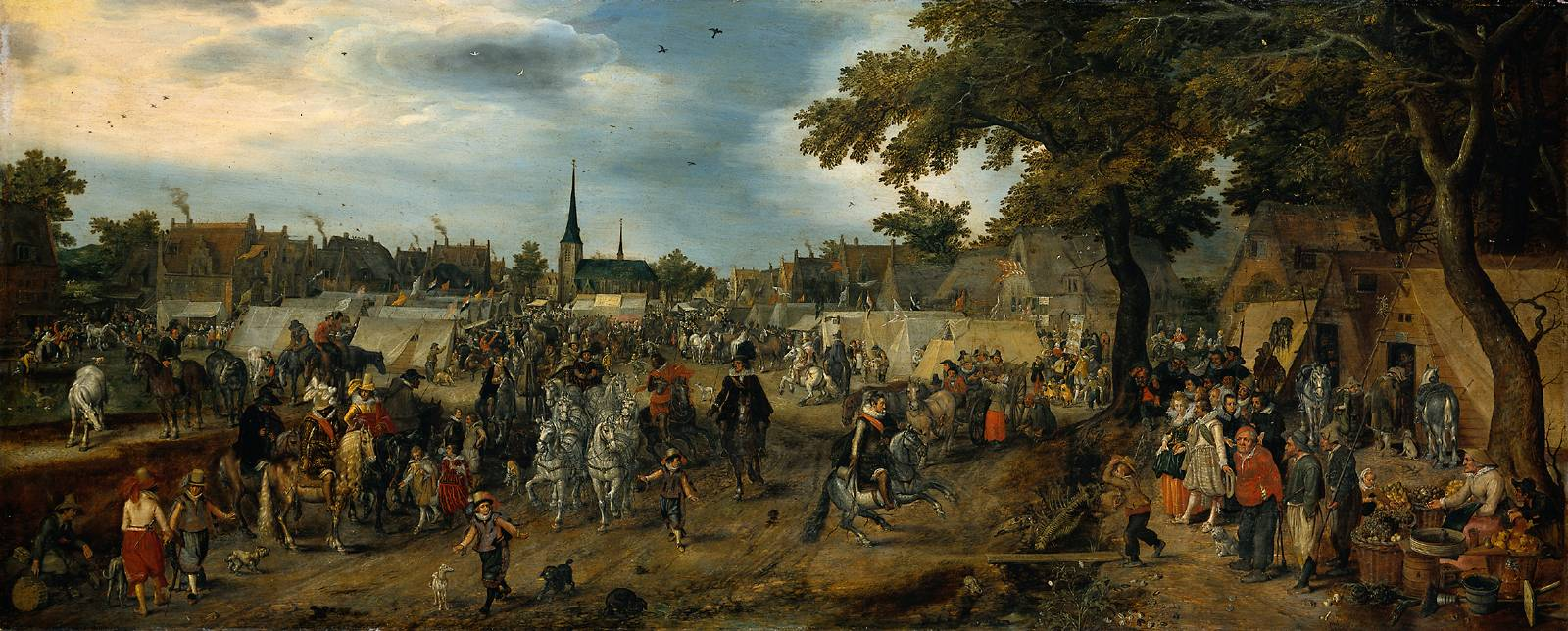
Valkenburg horse fair, 1618

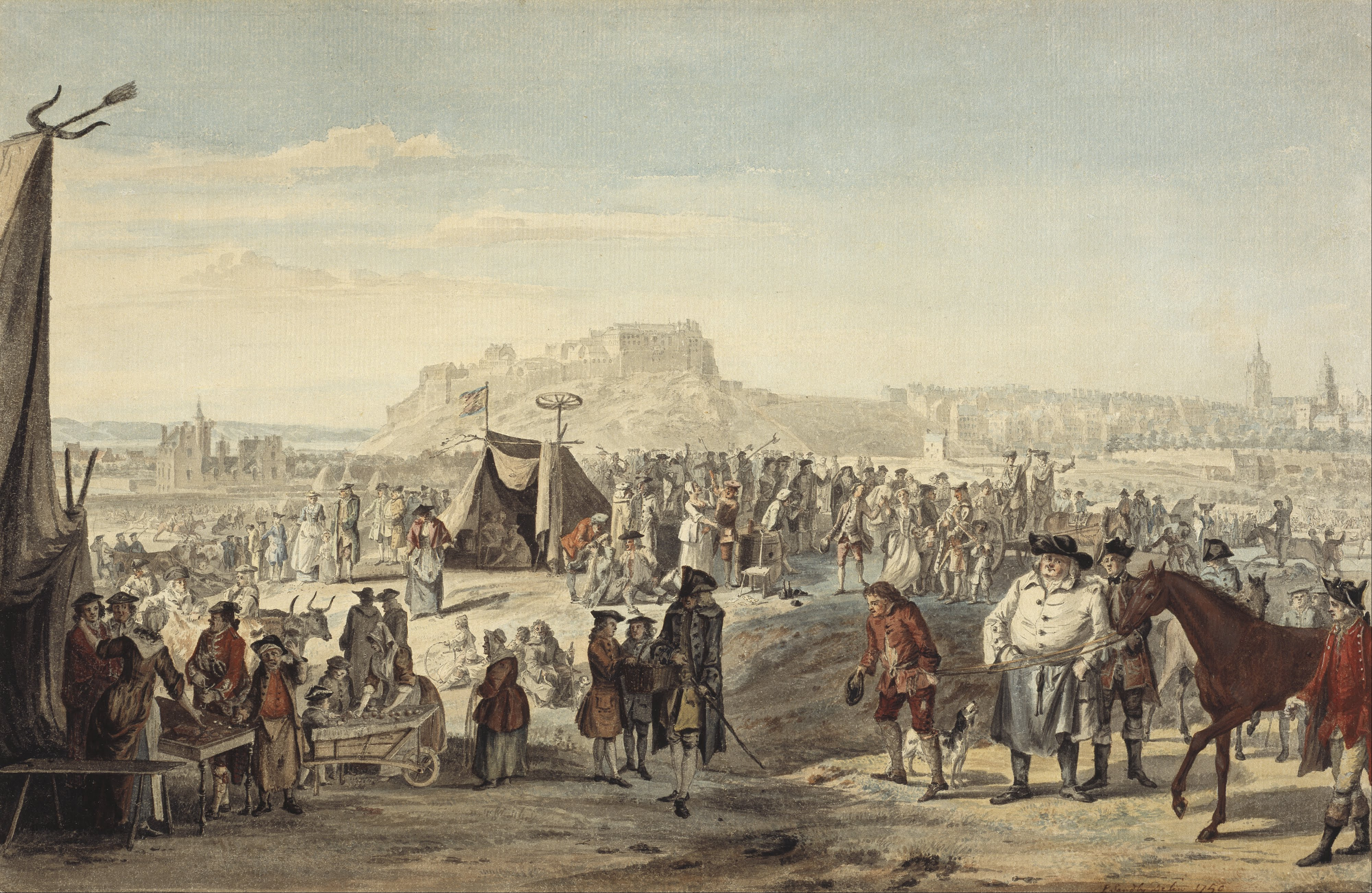
'Horse Fair on Bruntsfield Links, Edinburgh' by Paul Sandby, 1750

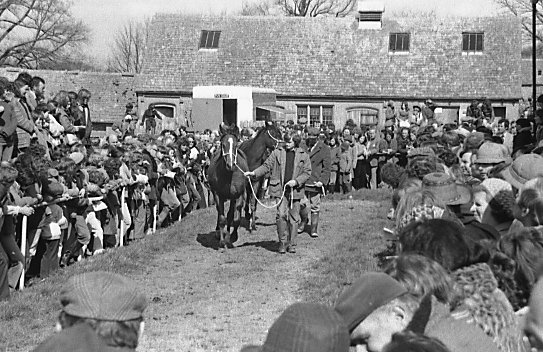
Stow Horse Fair, 1978

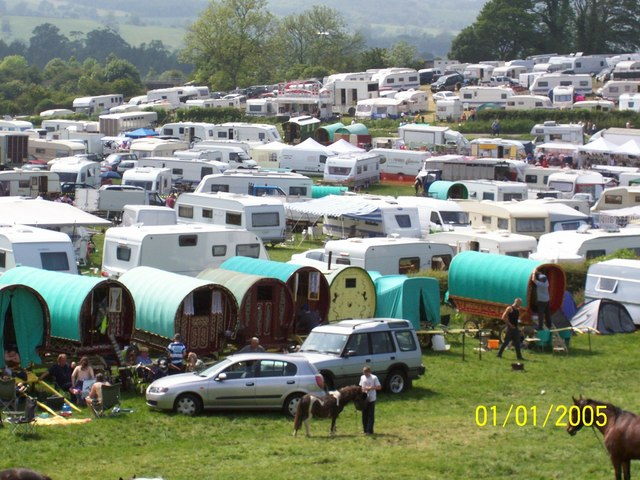
Appleby Horse Fair, 2007

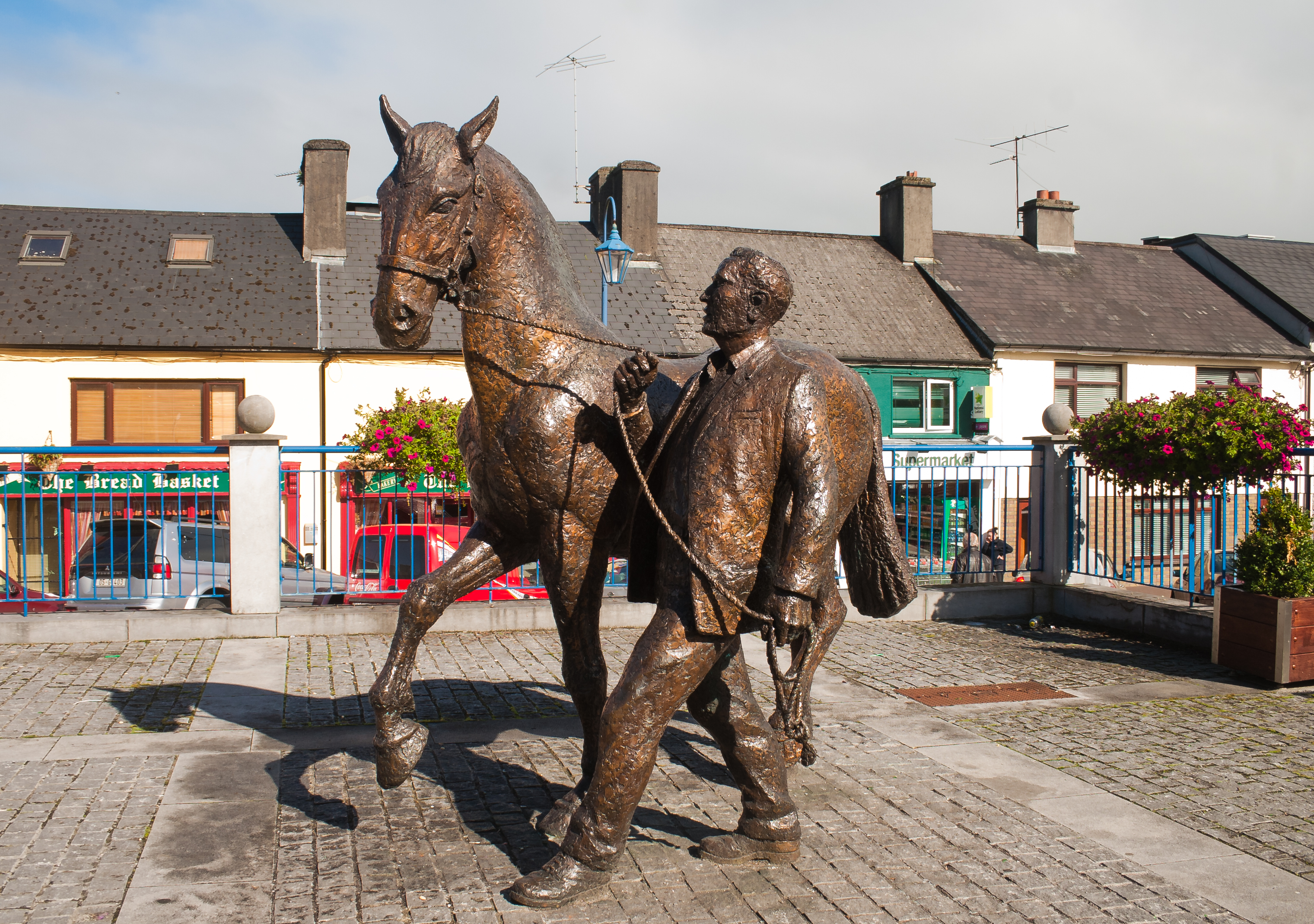
Bronze sculpture in reference to the Ballinasloe Horse Fair, 2003

== See also ==
- Stow Fair, Lincolnshire, lost medieval fair which continued as a horse fair until 1954
- Banagher Horse Fair, in Banagher, County Offaly, Ireland
- Ballinasloe Horse Fair, in Ballinasloe, County Galway, Ireland
- Tallow Horse Fair, in Tallow, County Waterford, Ireland
