= Ballinasloe Horse Fair =

Horse fair in County Galway, Ireland

Ballinasloe Horse Fair Aonach na gCapall
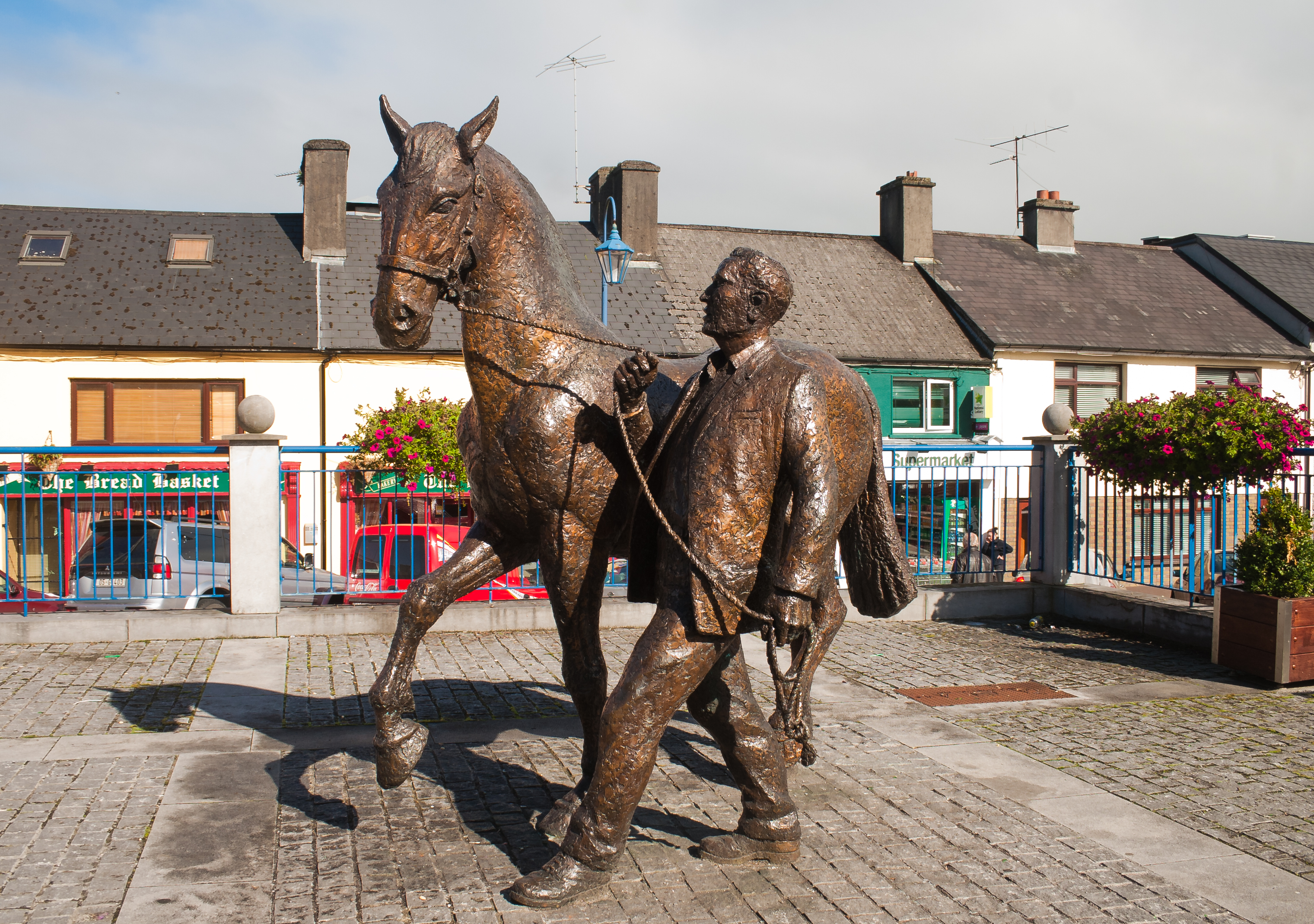
- Bronze sculpture in reference to the Ballinasloe Horse Fair
- Genre: Horse fair
- Frequency: Annually; 1st Sunday of October
- Locations: Ballinasloe, County Galway
- Country: Ireland
- Years active: 304 years and 1 month
- Attendance: 40,000 to 80,000
- Website: ballinasloeoctoberfair.com

The Ballinasloe Horse Fair (Irish: Aonach na gCapall) is a horse fair which is held annually at Ballinasloe, the second largest town in County Galway, in the western part of Ireland. It is Europe's oldest and largest horse fair, dating back to the 18th century. The annual event attracts up to 80,000 visitors. This festival is one of the most important social and economic events in the life of the town. The town also hosts other horse and pony riding, show jumping and other equestrian activities throughout the year.

== Festivities ==
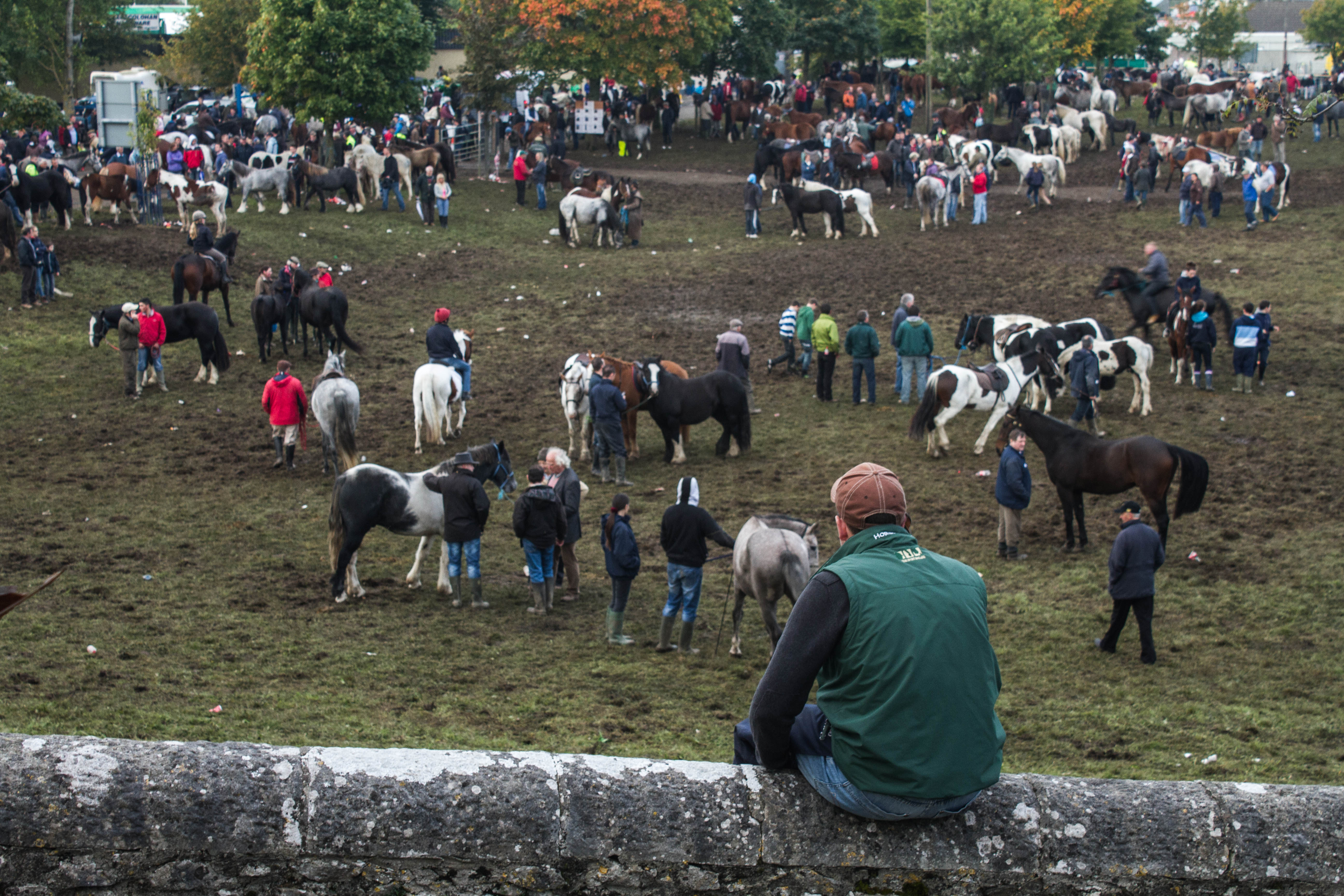
Ballinasloe Horse Fair in 2012

The fair lasts seven days and starts on the Sunday before the first Tuesday in October, when a parade through the town is held. It continues during the next week and includes a beauty contest (the Queen of the Fair), fireworks, tug-of-war competitions, dog shows, artistic and cultural events, singing competitions and fairground attractions as well as the titular horse fair. A large market also takes place on the streets of Ballinasloe. The latter event includes sale-and-purchase, racing and show-jumping and these are concentrated on a 6-acre site on Society Street - the fair green. Events culminate during the second week-end; the Sunday of which is known as "Country Fair Day". Traditionally, this was the day in the fair with the highest attendance from local rural residents.

== History ==
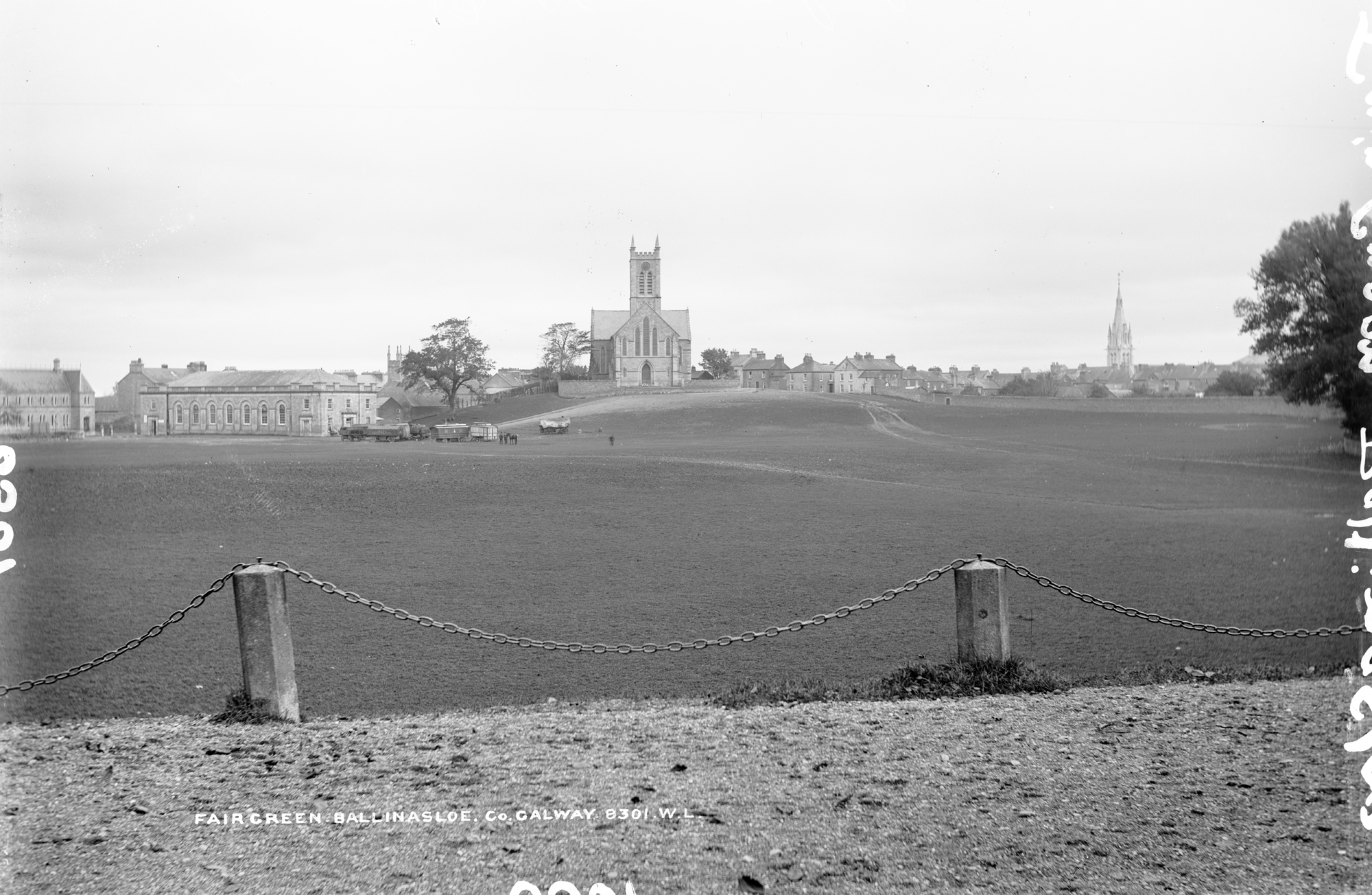
Ballinasloe Fair Green

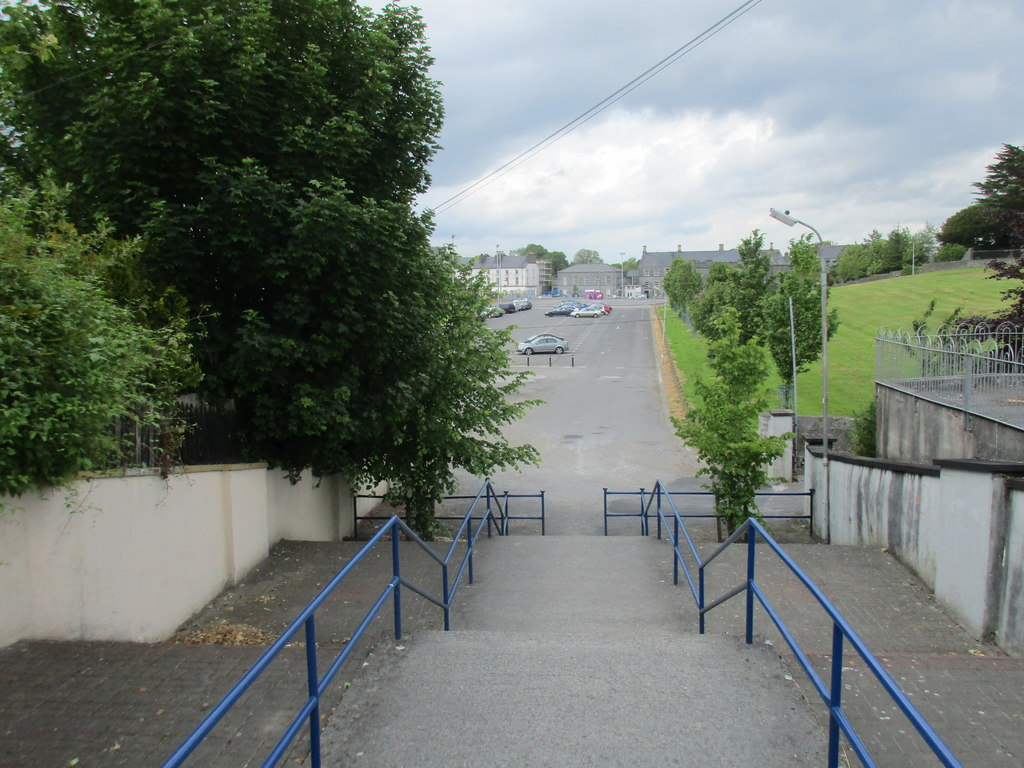
Steps down to the Fair Green

The fair is known by a variety of names, including the "Ballinasloe October Fair", the "October Fair" and the "Great Horse Fair" and it is the oldest horse fair in Ireland. It is now predominantly known as a horse fair, but previously served the range of agricultural interests associated with East Galway and South Roscommon, the hinterland of Ballinasloe. Traditionally, farmers from the eastern portions of Ireland travelled to Ballinasloe to purchase livestock from western counterparts.

Ballinasloe historically served as a meeting point, or hosting area, for clansmen from local tribes. Indeed, its name derives from Béal Átha na Sluaıghe, the Irish for "Ford-mouth of the Hostings". Evidence on the date of the fair's origin is scant but the town's traditional role as a meeting place justifies local traditional belief that this is an ancient event. By the late 18th century, the fair was being reported in The Times as involving the sale of "65,758 sheep, and 6,565 bullocks" while in the early 19th century the paper reported it as "the largest of its kind in Europe" (1804) and "the greatest in the British empire" (1816). Some reputed stories suggest that the event became more famous after Napoleon allegedly bought a horse there and rode it during the Battle of Austerlitz (1805).

A local land-owning family, the le Poer Trenches, who received the Earldom of Clancarty, shaped much of the 18th and 19th century history of the town. They exercised control over the fair owing to their ownership of the land around the town, coming known as the "Baron of the Fair". They sponsored the housing of the Farming Society of Ireland in Ballinasloe and in 1840 the Ballinasloe District Agricultural Society was formed. An Agricultural Hall was opened on Farming Society Street now renamed Society Street.

In 1948 a committee was formed that organised a carnival to coincide with the Fair and the Show.

President Michael D. Higgins and his wife Sabina visited and officially opened the 2018 fair and festival.

On 26 June 2020, the Ballinasloe Fair and Festival Co-Ordinating Committee cancelled the 298th fair due to the COVID-19 pandemic. The 2021 event was also cancelled due to the pandemic, though an unofficial, alternative event took place and was attended by previous attendees. Other cancellations were in 1915–18, 1940–45.

The 2022 event returned and marked the 300th anniversary of the fair, with 85,000 visitors attending.

== Association with the travelling community ==
The Ballinasloe Fair has a long traditional association with the Irish Travelling Community who regularly congregate there. Ballinasloe ranks with the Appleby Horse Fair, in Appleby-in-Westmorland in importance for this community. Horses used to be central to the Travellers itinerant lifestyle and many of the nomads still keep and breed them. However, older Travellers point out that some traditions are dying out.

== 2011 fair ==
The 2011 fair ran during the period of campaigning for the presidential election and the fair became a stop off on the campaign trail.
