= Whisby =

Hamlet in Lincolnshire, England

Coordinates: 53.195580°N 0.649114°W

- Hamlet
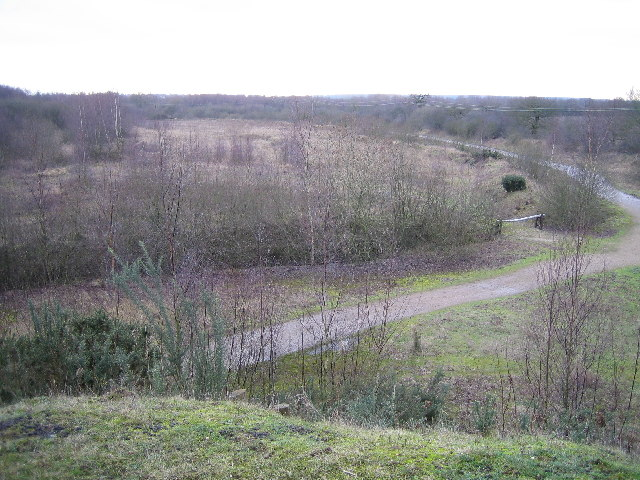
- Whisby Nature Park

- Location within Lincolnshire
- OS grid reference: SK903673
  - London: 125 mi (201 km) S
- Civil parish: Doddington and Whisby
- District: North Kesteven
- Shire county: Lincolnshire
- Region: East Midlands
- Country: England
- Sovereign state: United Kingdom
- Post town: Lincoln
- Postcode district: LN6
- Police: Lincolnshire
- Fire: Lincolnshire
- Ambulance: East Midlands
- UK Parliament: Sleaford and North Hykeham (UK Parliament constituency)

Whisby is a hamlet in the civil parish of Doddington and Whisby, in the North Kesteven district of Lincolnshire, England. It is situated 5 miles (8.0 km) south-west from Lincoln city centre, 1.5 miles (2.4 km) south from Doddington, and 2 miles (3.2 km) north from the A46 road.

Whisby was formerly a township in the parish of Doddington, in 1866 Whisby became a separate civil parish, on 1 April 1931 the parish was abolished and merged with Doddington to form "Doddington and Whisby". In 1921 the parish had a population of 99.

The name 'Whisby' means 'farm/settlement of Hvit'.

Between Whisby and Thorpe on the Hill, 3 miles (5 km) to the south, is Whisby Moor, which includes a nature park run by the Lincolnshire Wildlife Trust. Whisby also has a garden centre.

In 2011 the A46 road underwent reconstruction just outside Whisby. This included the building of a roundabout on the road which leads into the village.

The Nottingham–Lincoln line passes 0.5 miles (0.8 km) to the south of the village on Station Road, at a level crossing next to the Railway Inn.
