= Sutton St Edmund =

Village and civil parish in Lincolnshire, England

Coordinates: 52.698604°N 0.023666°E

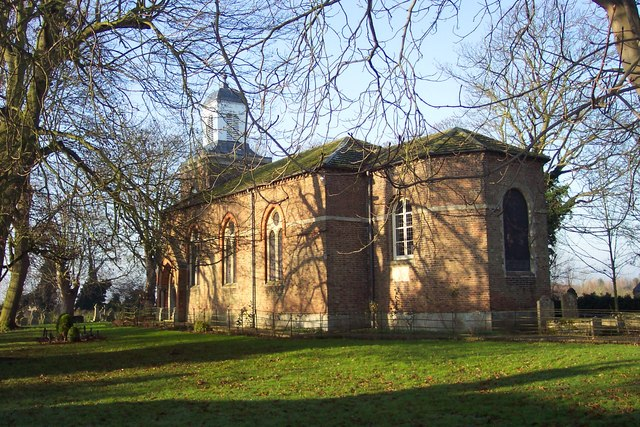
- St Edmund's church, Sutton St Edmund

- Location within Lincolnshire
- Population: 684 (Including Throckenholt. 2011)
- OS grid reference: TF368131
  - London: 100 mi (160 km) S
- District: South Holland
- Shire county: Lincolnshire
- Region: East Midlands
- Country: England
- Sovereign state: United Kingdom
- Post town: Spalding
- Postcode district: PE12
- Police: Lincolnshire
- Fire: Lincolnshire
- Ambulance: East Midlands
- UK Parliament: South Holland and The Deepings

Sutton St Edmunds is a village and civil parish in the South Holland district of Lincolnshire, England, about 14 miles (23 km) south-east from the town of Spalding.

Sutton St Edmunds was a chapelry to the parish of Long Sutton until 1866. The parish includes the hamlet of Throckenholt.

The parish church is a red-brick Grade II listed building dedicated to Saint Edmund. It was completely rebuilt in 1795, and has 19th-century alterations and extensions. It was extended again in 1987.

The village has a village hall.

Guanock House is a red-brick Grade II listed building. It was built in 1699 and has a 20th-century roof.

Sutton St Edmunds school was built in 1896 by Sutton St Edmunds School Board. It became a council school in 1903. It was known as Sutton St Edmund Chapel End School in the 20th century. It closed in 1969–70.

Throckenholt Priory was sited here. It was a hermitage and chapel in existence from at least 1107–1540. It was granted to Thorney Abbey by Nigel, Bishop of Ely.
