= Banagher Horse Fair =

Horse fair in County Offaly, Ireland

The Banagher Horse Fair, the oldest horse fair in Ireland, is held every September in Banagher, County Offaly, Ireland.

== History ==
Founded by a royal charter from Charles I, approx 1608 it has been run every year since. It was an important fair for the British Army to purchase horses for the cavalry regiments.

== Controversy ==
Banagher will always have an Annual Street Horse Fair. It is a Chartered given right. The tradition is extremely strong. It has been passed down through the centuries. A campaign against the fair has culminated in the Garda Síochána, and Inspectors from the Department of Agriculture attempting to shut down the fair, on instruction of Offaly County Council headed by local councillors John Leahy and Peter Ormonde. However, locals held the fair regardless, a much smaller affair on top of the hill. In 2015 huge crowds came to show solidarity with the locals. Fans of the horsefair think that future looks bright for this long old traditional way of life.

=== Background ===
Attempts were made to have the horsefair moved from its traditional pitch at Market Square in the town out to the new bypass, but the sheer size of the fair meant that that was not possible to enforce. A number of supporters of the fair were in the early stages of organising a campaign to keep the fair alive, being as one said "one of the better traditions left from the times as part of the UK". Banagher Horse Fair is a traditional street fair . The horse fair was never controversial until the authorities started to interfere . There was never any hassle with the fair until recently when county councillors got involved .
