= The Museum of Technology =

Coordinates: 52.665465°N 0.000965°E

The Museum of Technology the History of Gadgets and Gizmos (formerly The Museum of Technology, The Great War and WWII) is a technology museum in Throckenholt, a village in Lincolnshire, England, UK. The museum was originally started in the Old Town of Hemel Hempstead, Hertfordshire. After operating there for 15 years, the collection moved to a new, purpose-built centre in Throckenholt. The trustees spent four years creating the new space to house the collection. The new museum opened in August 2016.

The displayed objects present the evolution of electrical, electronic, and warfare technology from 1850 to 1980, including World War I and World War II. The museum closes from October to May and opens on Thursdays Fridays and Saturdays during the summer months. Details of opening times are shown on the web site www.museumoftechnology.org.uk

Many of the artefacts on display can be demonstrated, allow 1 to 2 hours to see the eclectic collection.

The museum's former Hemel Hempstead site is due to reopen as a manicure salon and beauty parlour.

== See also ==
- List of museums in Lincolnshire
