= North Lincolnshire Museum =

Local museum in Scunthorpe, England

Coordinates: 53.5870°N 0.6546°W

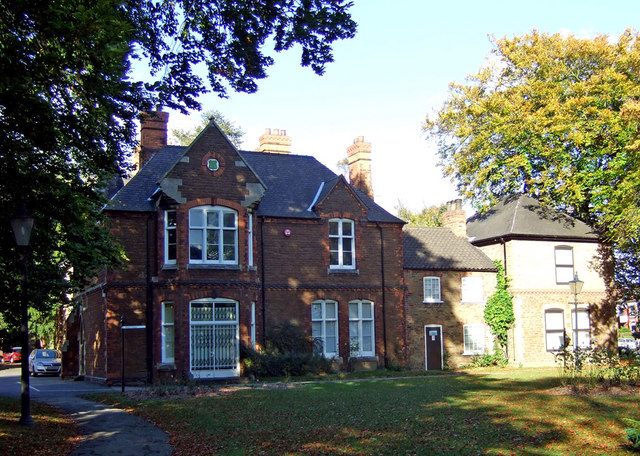
The North Lincolnshire Museum in the old Frodingham St Lawrence vicarage

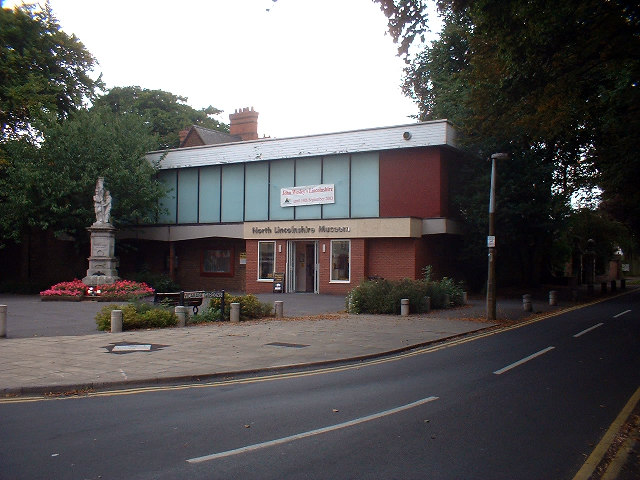
The modern extension to the museum

North Lincolnshire Museum (formerly known as Scunthorpe Museum) is a local museum in the town of Scunthorpe, North Lincolnshire, England.

== Overview ==
The museum is on Oswald Road, near the Scunthorpe railway station. It is run by North Lincolnshire Council. The museum has interactive exhibits and covers archaeology, nature, the Victorian era, and war time. It is housed in the former Frodingham vicarage, built in 1874 on the site of Frodingham Hall. There is also a modern extension to the museum.

It re-opened in February 2016 after undergoing a £150,000 refurbishment.

== Gallery ==
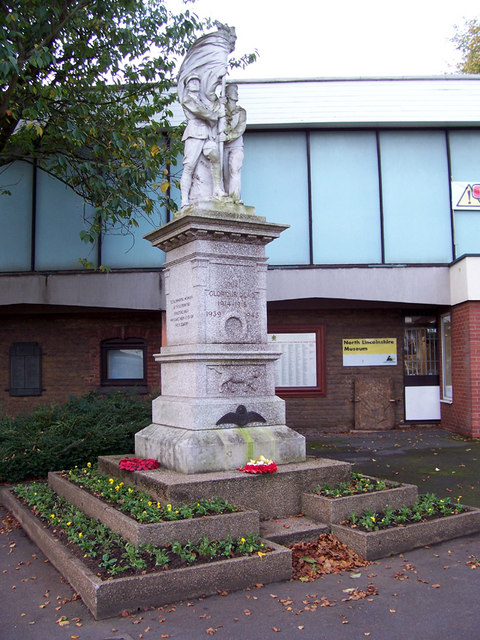
The Scunthorpe War Memorial, situated on the forecourt of the museum on Oswald Road.

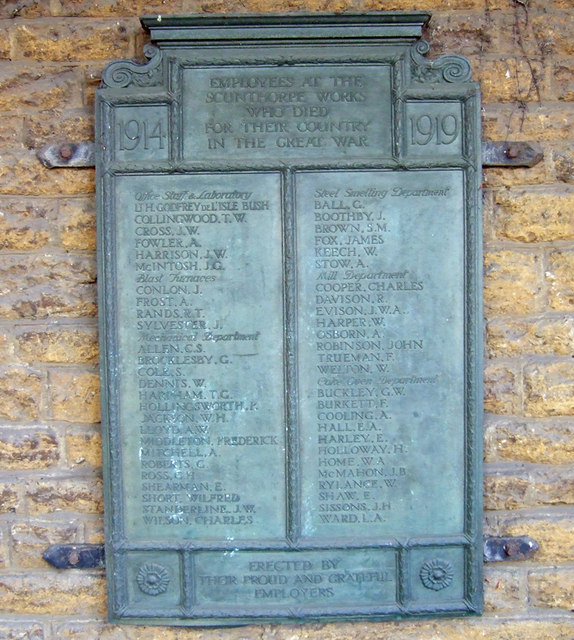
Great War memorial tablet, set on the wall of the museum, listing the names of those employed at the Iron and Steel works who died in the First World War.

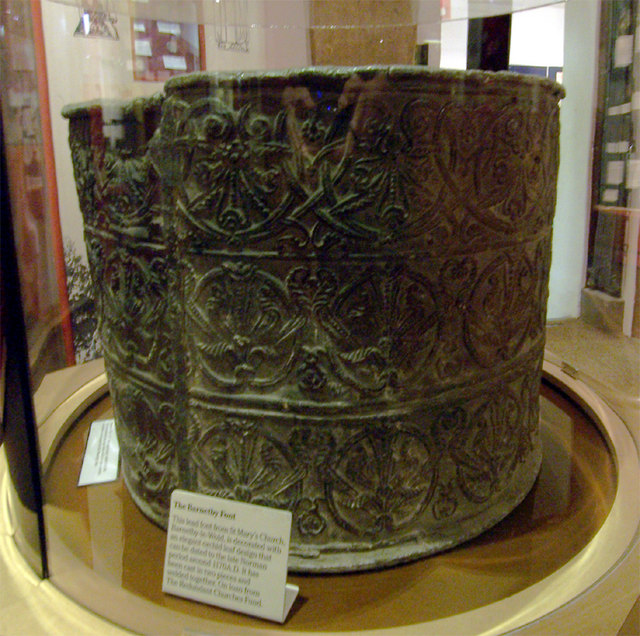
The Barnetby Font, a rare lead baptismal font from the church of St Mary, Barnetby-le-Wold, North Lincolnshire, dating from about 1170 AD, now housed in the museum.

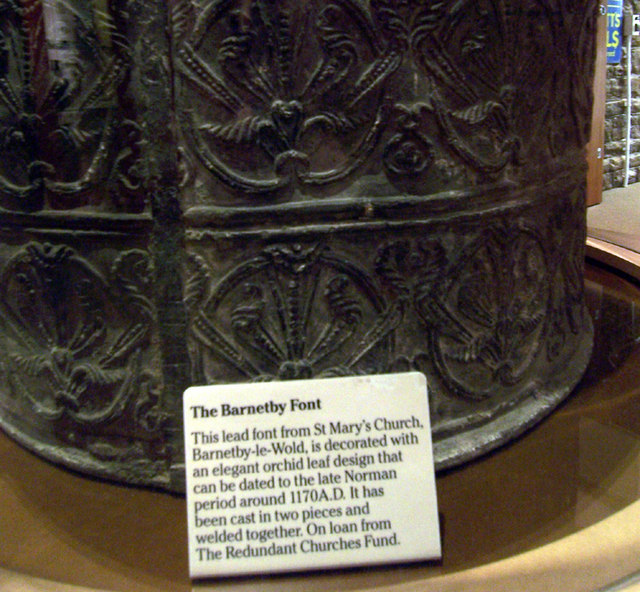
Detailed view of the Barnetby Font.

== See also ==
- List of museums in Lincolnshire
- Ethel Rudkin
