= Baysgarth Park =

Park in England

Coordinates: 53.6796°N 0.4395°W

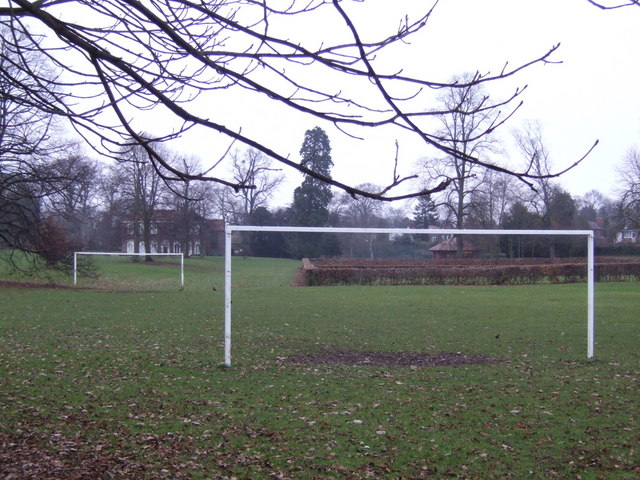
Baysgarth Park.

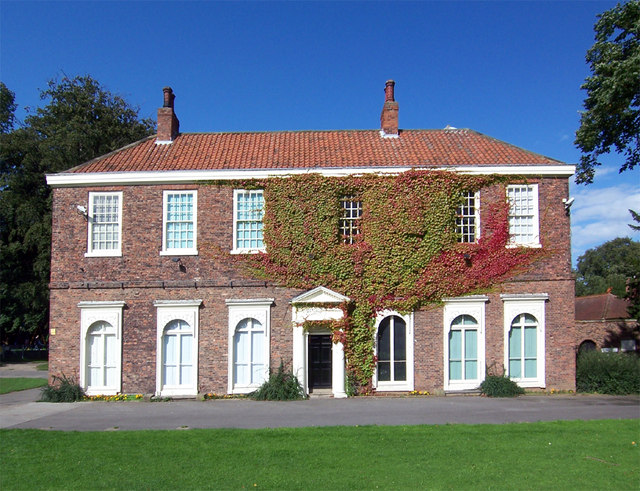
Baysgarth House, housing the Baysgarth House Museum, in the park.

Baysgarth Park is a public park situated in the market town of Barton-upon-Humber, Lincolnshire, England.

The park provides thirty acres of recreational space off Brigg Road to the south of the town. Baysgarth House, located in the park, contains Baysgarth House Museum, which illustrates the history, archaeology, flora and fauna of the district. Baysgarth Leisure Centre is also located here.

In July 2018 it was awarded a Green Flag Award following a series of renovations.
