= Baysgarth House Museum =

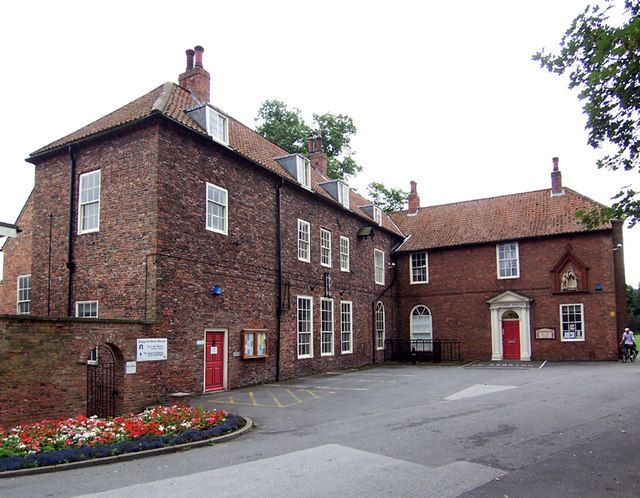

- Location within Lincolnshire
- Established: 1981; 45 years ago
- Location: Baysgarth House, Baysgarth Park, Barton-upon-Humber, North Lincolnshire, UK
- Coordinates: 53.6804°N 0.4387°W
- Type: Archaeological and Social History Museum
- Website: https://www.baysgarthhouse.org.uk/

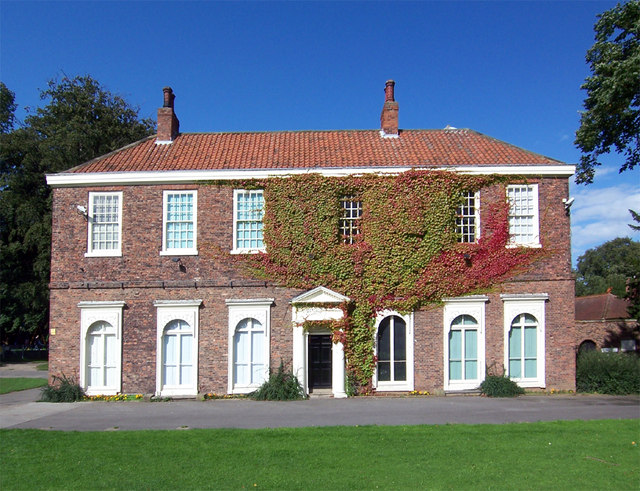
Baysgarth House, housing the museum.

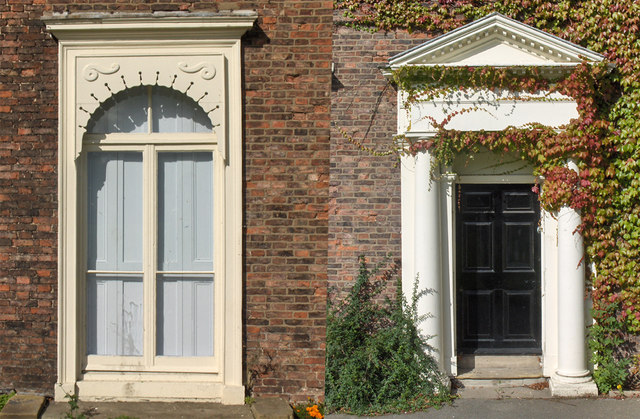
Detail of a ground floor window and the front doorway.

Baysgarth House Museum is a local museum located in Baysgarth House, situated in Baysgarth Park, in the market town of Barton-upon-Humber, Lincolnshire, England.

== Baysgarth House ==
Baysgarth House is a Grade II* listed building, believed to date from c. 1731. The building is built on an L-plan, with 2 storeys and an attic in red brick with a hipped pantiled roof. The building has an adjacent grade II listed stable building, believed to date from the early 19th Century, and an adjacent cottage believed to have been built for servants. Also attached to the property are the grade II* listed gate piers in an 18th-century style, topped by a lion and a unicorn. The two lodges in the wall date from the 19th Century.

The first known owner of Baysgarth House is Thomas Glentham. The Nelthorpes owned the house between 1620 and 1792. It passed through various owners until 1889 when it was sold to Robert Wright Taylor. Taylor and his wife Clara Lousia Taylor had two children in the house. After the son, George Robert Marmaduke Stanbury Taylor, died in the Battle of Ypres, their daughter Clare Ermyntrude Magdalen Wight Ramsden subsequently married and left the area leaving the house to the public in 1930. A memorial to Robert Wright, Clara Louisa, and George Robert was unveiled at the site by Clare Ramsden in July 1930 as part of the formal opening of the park and house to the public. The opening ceremony was attended by more than 3000 people.

During the Second World War and ARP Officer used the house. From 1960-1997 it was used by the local council. It opened as a museum in 1981.

== As a museum ==
North Lincolnshire Council declared Baysgarth House a community asset and leased the Georgian House to new custodians The Ropewalk, along with £450,000 of council support to protect this landmark. Baysgarth House is now to undergo a restoration programme to transform it into a vibrant community facility that will benefit all residents and further boost Barton’s reputation as an important visitor destination.

The Baysgarth Stables Cafe is open from Wednesday to Sunday between 10am and 4pm serving a selection of dishes crafted from fresh local produce, ensuring that every meal is not only delicious but also supports local producers. An adjoining ice-cream kiosk serves Blyton Ice Cream as well as a range of traditional sweets.

== See also ==
- List of museums in Lincolnshire
