= Tallow Horse Fair =

Annual horse fair in Tallow, County Waterford, Ireland

Tallow Horse Fair Irish: Aonach Capall Tulach an Iarainn
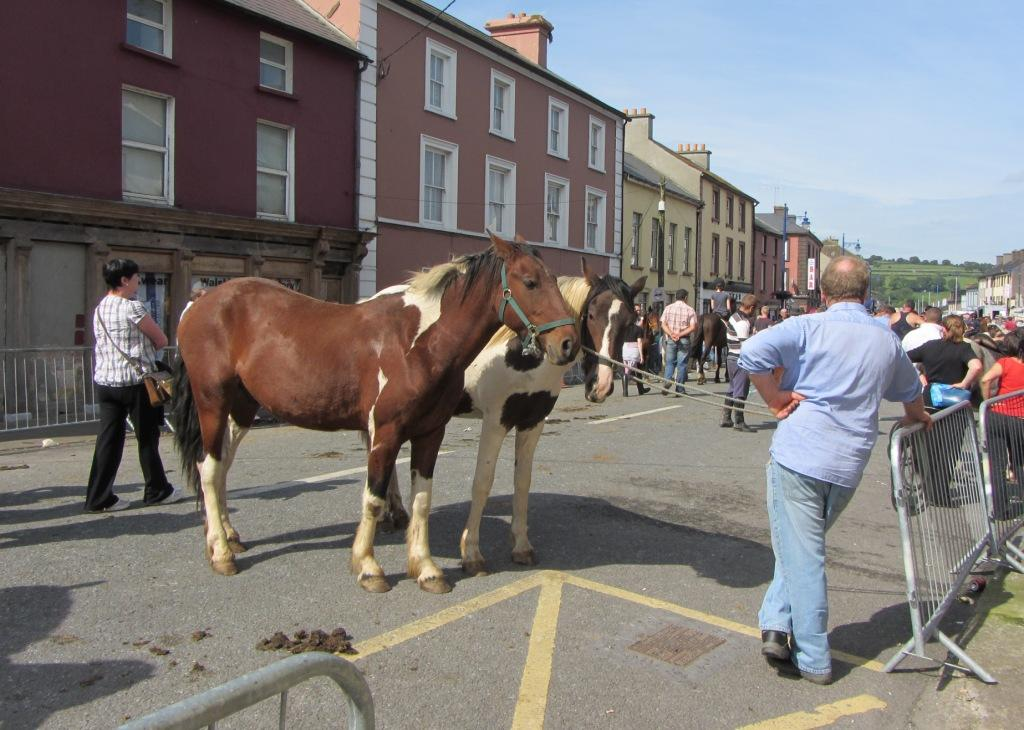
- Ponies at the Tallow Horse Fair, 2012
- Status: Active
- Genre: Horse fair
- Frequency: Annually; 3 September (Note: Alternatively the following Monday if it falls on a weekend.)
- Locations: Tallow, County Waterford
- Coordinates: 52°5′37″N 8°0′24″W
- Country: Ireland
- Years active: 122 years, 2 months
- Inaugurated: 3 September 1904
- Major events: Horse trading

The Tallow Horse Fair (Irish: Aonach Capall Tulach an Iarainn) is a horse fair which takes place annually in Tallow, County Waterford, Ireland. Held every year since 1904, it occurs on the 3 September, unless it falls on a weekend, in which case it takes place on the following Monday. It is considered the 'unofficial holiday' of Tallow, with traffic through the town being restricted for the duration of the fair. Activities include both horse trading and casual trading. Like other horse fairs in Ireland, it is frequented by Travellers. The Horse Fair was cancelled in 2020 and 2021 due to restrictions imposed during the COVID-19 pandemic, returning in 2022.

== History ==
The first Tallow Horse Fair was held on Saturday, 3 September 1904. The original organising committee consisted of President Fr William Meagher; Tallow's Catholic parish priest, Vice President R. Bolster; manager of the local branch of the Munster & Leinster Bank, Treasurer T.J. Keniry and Secretaries D. Slattery and P.J. Hogan. The Waterford News noted that over 250 horses changed hands, of 750 present in Tallow, including purchases for the British Army by a Colonel Williams of the Remount Department, and praised the fair's organisation. Subsequent incarnations of the Horse Fair would be held on the following Monday where the 3 September fell on the weekend. More recent horse fairs have also taken place without an organising committee.
