= Doddington, Lincolnshire =

Village in Lincolnshire, England

Coordinates: 53.219°N 0.654°W

Doddington
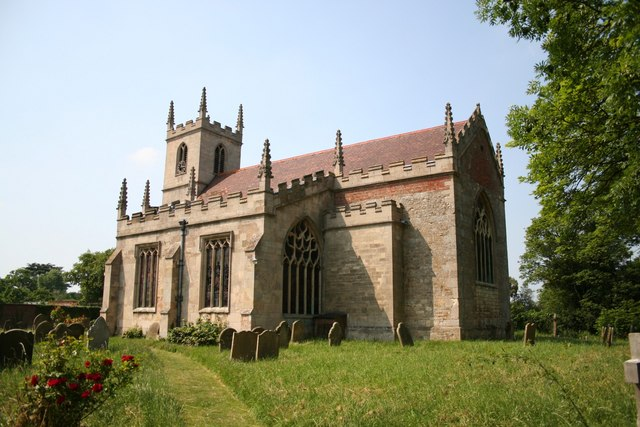
- Church of St Peter, Doddington

- Location within Lincolnshire
- OS grid reference: SK899700
  - London: 120 mi (190 km) S
- Civil parish: Doddington and Whisby
- District: North Kesteven
- Shire county: Lincolnshire
- Region: East Midlands
- Country: England
- Sovereign state: United Kingdom
- Post town: Lincoln
- Postcode district: LN6
- Dialling code: 01522
- Police: Lincolnshire
- Fire: Lincolnshire
- Ambulance: East Midlands
- UK Parliament: Sleaford and North Hykeham

Doddington is a village in the civil parish of Doddington and Whisby, in the North Kesteven district of Lincolnshire, England. The population of the civil parish of "Doddington and Whisby" at the 2011 census was 319. The parish of Doddington and Whisby lies 5 miles (8 km) west of Lincoln, to the north of the A46 road, and is bounded to its west by Nottinghamshire. It includes the hamlet of Whisby, and parts of the Whisby Moor Nature Reserve.

In 1921 the parish of Doddington had a population of 128. On 1 April 1931 the parish was abolished and merged with Whisby to form "Doddington and Whisby".

In the Domesday Book of 1086, Doddington is written as "Dodingtone", in the Hundred of Graffoe, in Kesteven. It held 21 households, 14 villagers, 6 smallholders, a church with priest, and 4 ploughlands. Before the Conquest, lordship was held by Aelric son of Mergeat; after, the abbey of Westminster St Peter became Lord and Tenant-in-chief.

Doddington's Grade II listed parish church is dedicated to St Peter. The church was rebuilt in 1771 but retained its Early English font; the rebuilding was under the auspices of Lord Delaval. Pevsner notes that the architects, Thomas and William Lumby, retained and copied north aisle details from the previous Decorated building, and that the church holds a c.1569 chalice, a 1670 alms basin, a 1706 flagon by John Bodington, and a 1706 paten by William Fawdery.

John 'Jack' Delaval (1756-1775), the last male heir of the Delaval family, died aged nineteen and was buried in St Peter's Doddington. Reportedly the church interior was painted black for the funeral.

Other listed structures include farm houses, cottages and occupational buildings.

Within the village is the Grade I listed Elizabethan house, Doddington Hall, a former seat of the Northumbrian Delaval family. The house is E-plan, and surmounted by three octagonal brick turrets with leaded cupolas.
