= Robert Wright Taylor =

British solicitor

Robert Wright Taylor FSA (21 November 1859 – 19 March 1929) was a British solicitor.

== Biography ==
Taylor was the only son of Robert Taylor (1815-1890) and Sarah Maw and grew up in Stanbury, West Yorkshire. The Taylor family were on good social terms with the Brontë family, and Branwell Brontë had painted a portrait of Taylor's father as a young man. Taylor was educated at Trinity College, Cambridge and worked as a solicitor.

Taylor purchased Baysgarth House in Barton-upon-Humber in 1889 and lived there with his family. An entry in the school log for Stanbury Boarding School in Haworth on 6 September 1912 records a visit by Taylor with his wife and two children. It records that Taylor had just purchased Ponden Hall and that he gifted eight book prizes each year to the school.

Robert Wright Taylor and his wife Clara Louisa are commemorated, along with their son George Robert Marmaduke Stanbury Taylor (who died at the Battle of Ypres), by their daughter Clare Ermyntrude Magdalen Wight Ramsden on a plaque at Baysgarth House. Clare donated the house and its gardens to the public in July 1930. The opening ceremony was attended by more than 3000 people.

Taylor was a Fellow of the Society of Antiquaries of London.
