= Ballyclare May Fair =

Horse fair in County Antrim, Northern Ireland

- Genre: Horse fair
- Frequency: Annually in May
- Location(s): Ballyclare, County Antrim
- Country: Northern Ireland
- Years active: 268 years, 9 months, 2 weeks and 3 days
- Attendance: 20,000
- Website: antrimandnewtownabbey.gov.uk/ballyclaremayfair/

The Ballyclare May Fair is a horse fair which is held annually in May at Ballyclare, in County Antrim, Northern Ireland. The annual event attracts up to 20,000 visitors and over 100 stalls annually.

== Festivities ==
The fair lasts seven days and begins on a Tuesday in mid-May, when a mixture of local music and entertainment combined with traditional craft demonstrations and workshops is held. A parade takes place and hosts many participants and local groups before a soapbox derby race commences, with a fireworks finale. Other events include family fun activities, amusements, street performers, local movies, tea dance, shows and much more.

== History ==
The fair was traditionally held on a Tuesday in late May but in the nineteenth century such was the demand for horses that the Monday was given over to this sale. Representatives of cavalry regiments from all over Europe came to buy as the reputation of the fair spread. Local farmers also needed horses to plough and transport their produce, while the nearby city of Belfast sought carriage horses and sturdy animals to pull carts. The great days of the horse fair ended with the First World War and the growth of mechanisation. In 1948, a committee of local people came together to revive the May Fair. It was to grow in the following years to become a week long festival which began with the Mayor's Parade. More features were added each year with a fancy dress parade and floats on the opening Saturday and a pipe band contest adding a colourful ending to the week. By the late 1950s the local newspapers were reporting that the fair was attracting 20,000 people to the town. By the 1970s, the fair was suspended for several years during the worst years of the Troubles.

The 2020 fair was cancelled by Antrim and Newtownabbey Borough Council due to the COVID-19 pandemic. It was announced that almost £60k was lost due to the cancellation. There were cancellations from 1940 to 1947, 1974 to 1978 and 2020 to 2021.
