= Appleby Horse Fair =

Romani and Traveller convention in Cumbria, England

Coordinates: 54.5893°N 2.4950°W

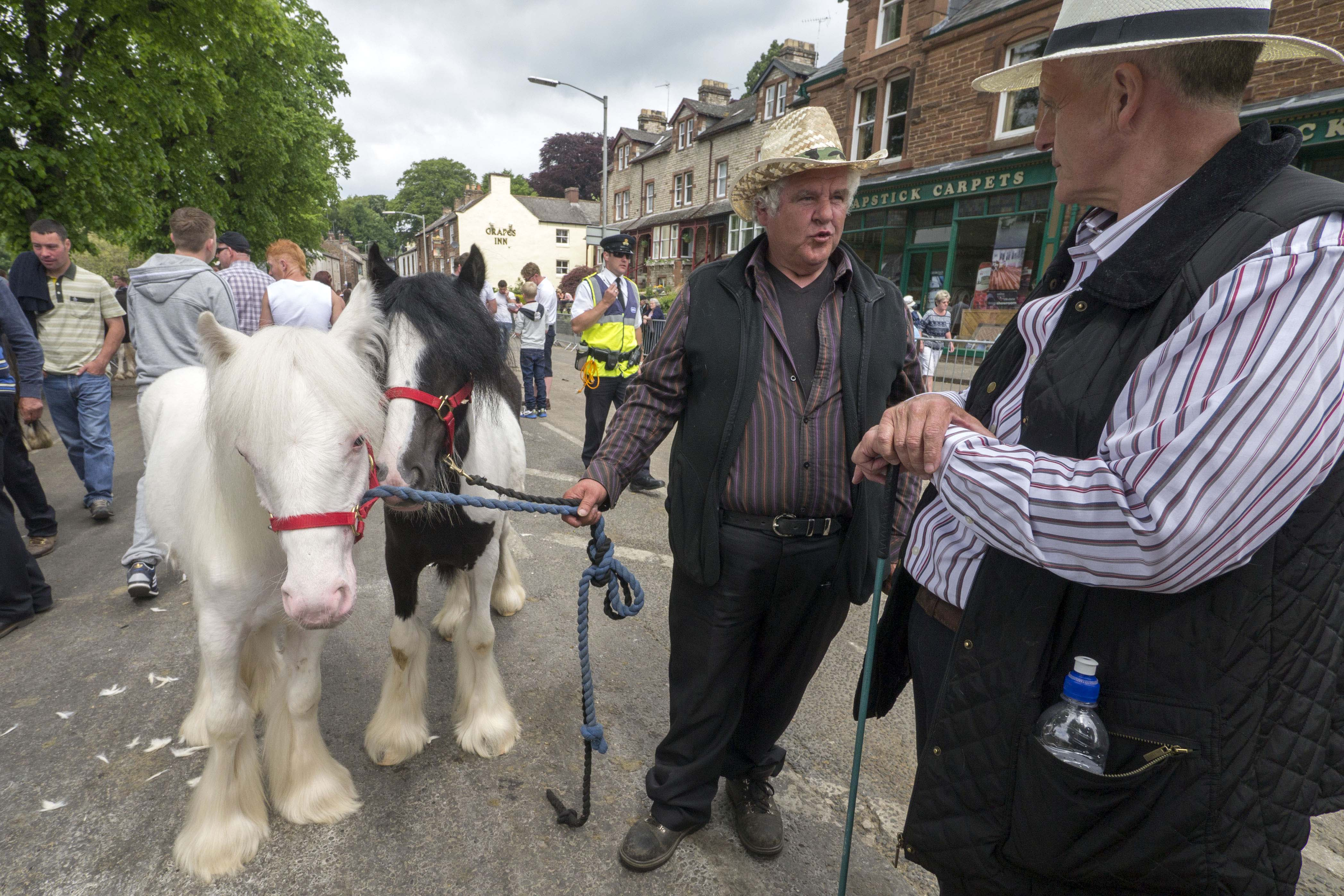
- Status: Active
- Genre: Romani and Traveller horse fair
- Date: June
- Frequency: Annually
- Location: Appleby-in-Westmorland
- Country: England
- Website: applebyfair.org

The Appleby Horse Fair, previously known as Appleby New Fair, is an annual gathering of Romani people (Gypsies) and Travellers in Appleby-in-Westmorland in Cumbria, England. The horse fair is held each year in early June, attracting roughly 10,000 Roma and Travellers, about 1,000 caravans, several hundred horse-drawn vehicles, and about 30,000 visitors.

The fair is billed as the largest traditional Gypsy Fair in Europe, and is held outside the town of Appleby where the Roman Road crosses Long Marton Road. Horses are washed in the River Eden and trotted up and down the 'flashing lane'. There is a market selling a variety of goods, including those traditional to the Romani and Irish traveller communities, and a range of other horse-related products. The fair incorporates horse riding, horse trading, storytelling and traditional music and dance performances alongside the sale and display of traditional clothing, cuisine and handmade crafts. Hand-painted Romanichal vardos and Irish Traveller wagons are also displayed at the fair.

== History ==
The fair was never chartered, but was started in order to compete with the existing chartered Appleby fair. Originally named "New Fair", the name stuck even after the original fair closed and the borough expanded to include the grounds of the New Fair. It was originally a livestock market, not a horse fair, until the advent of the railway caused livestock markets to relocate near the railways.

Appleby's medieval borough fair, held at Whitsuntide, ceased in 1885. The 'New Fair', held in early June on Gallows Hill, which was then unenclosed land outside the borough boundary, began in 1775 for sheep and cattle drovers and horse dealers to sell their stock; by the 1900s it had evolved into a major Romani and Traveller occasion. Throughout the fair's history, no group claimed ownership of the fair or was charged to attend it, staying to one of the fair's principles of being a people's fair.

The legal status of the fair does not depend on a charter, but on the legal concept of 'prescriptive right': easement by prescription or custom. (Note: Praescriptio est titulus ex usu et tempore substantiam capiens ab auctoritate legis; "Prescription is a title by authority of law, deriving its force from use and time.")

== Controversies ==
The horse fair has generated some controversy over the years, with some complaints of mess being left in the town, violent crime, and animal cruelty. The Local Authority (Eden District Council, which convenes the Multi-Agency Strategic Co-Ordinating Group to manage the official response to the fair) is required to deal with these matters, and their official sources provide a context for these controversial issues.

In 2014, there were 28 arrests at the fair, the lowest for several years; arrests were made for, among other things, drug use, drunkenness, and obstruction, which senior police confirmed was not disproportionate to other large-scale public gatherings. In 2015, this number came down further, with only 15 arrests over the whole fair, for what the police described as "mostly low level disorder". During the 2018 fair there were 7 arrests, including one arrest for a previously issued warrant. The number of caravans in the Eden District in 2018 was significantly higher, approximately 20% up on 2017. At the rescheduled 2021 fair, police noted that, with 13 arrests, it was the "worst level of fair-related offending in Appleby since 2014."

In 2015, the MASCG Committee reported that improvements in provision of litter bins and signage had resulted a reduction in the number of tonnes of litter from 43 tonnes (47 tons) to 29 tonnes (32 tons).

The cost of policing the fair in 2021 (post Covid) was stated as £344,464 and fell to £167,595 in 2022. There is controversy regarding other costs met by the Cumbrian taxpayer. The fair brings in significant income for local businesses and land owners, particularly accommodation and fast food providers, public houses, grocery stores and campsite owners, but many local businesses prefer to close their doors while the fair is in progress. All licensed campsites pay their own clean up costs, and the local authority pays for street cleaning and provision of basic services at authorised and un-authorised stopping places. In 2024 local residents requested a detailed breakdown of public costs.

In 2021, Shera Rom Billy Welch warned Home Secretary Priti Patel that the event was threatened by the proposed Police, Crime, Sentencing and Courts Bill, stating that if the bill was enforced, police could confiscate the homes of Gypsies and Travellers if, upon complaint of local residents, they did not immediately move on. Welch highlighted the substantial shortage of approved permanent pitches and transit pitches at Traveller sites, leaving many Travellers with nowhere legal to stop. (Note: In October 2020, the charity Friends, Families and Travellers reported writing to all local authorities and private registered site providers in England asking about the availability of sites, receiving responses relating to 251 out of 266 registered Travellers sites in England, representing 3,482 permanent pitches and 304 transit pitches (short-term, typically ≤ 3 months). They found that there were 13 permanent sites and five transit sites with 59 permanent and 42 transit pitches available, and 1,696 households are on waiting lists.)

== Cancelled fairs ==
The fair was cancelled in 2001 due to an outbreak of foot-and-mouth disease.

In 2020, the fair was cancelled due to the COVID-19 pandemic. The 2020 fair was held nonetheless with six participants, in response to a Traveller belief that the fair would be lost if it did not occur. As many as a hundred spectators also defied the ban. The slow response to cancel the Fair in 2020 caused upset in the town; the impression from some was that the council put financial gain of a few over the health of Travellers and locals, particularly the vulnerable and elderly, waiting for government legislation to be enforced rather than acting on guidance before the event was cancelled.

In 2021, COVID-19 restrictions on mass gatherings prevented the fair taking place on the traditional dates (3–7 June), and on 21 June 2021 the Multi Agency Strategic Co-ordinating Group published a statement to the effect that alternative dates of 12–15 August 2021 had been identified for the 2021 Appleby Fair, subject to favourable COVID-19 data and the national relaxation of restrictions on large gatherings, which were planned to be announced on 21 June 2021. According to police estimates, 300-400 people visited Appleby over the weekend of 4–6 June, mostly day trippers, being a mixture of Gypsies and tourists. Behaviour was described as "very positive in the main". There were only around 10 caravans instead of the usual 1,000-plus.

In 2022, the fair began on 9 June 2022, to avoid a clash with the Queen's Platinum Jubilee celebrations.

== Animal welfare ==
The RSPCA patrols the fair scrupulously and, although in 2009 Animal Aid called for the fair to be banned, the instances of cruelty are few, and are prosecuted where they do occur. Warnings and advice are given in borderline cases, and the very great majority of horses at the fair are well looked after, well treated, and in good condition. In 2016, the RSPCA stated unequivocally that although there were some welfare issues, mostly brought about by the hot weather, there is only a small minority of people who attend the Fair that have little regard for animal welfare.

On 15th July 2024, a man was found guilty of two offences under the Animal Welfare Act 2006 and banned from owning horses after driving his in-foal mare to exhaustion in the previous year's Appleby Horse Fair.

In 2024, two horses died at the fair after being worked to exhaustion. The RSPCA and Gypsy and Traveller representatives issued statements appealing for information about the persons responsible and condemning the cruelty, which Shera Rom Billy Welch described as 'a stain on the reputation of the fair which will be hard to wash out.' Both he and RSPCA noted that the very great majority of horses at the fair are well treated and in good condition.

== See also ==
- Market town
- Town privileges
