= Gordon Boswell Romany Museum =

Museum of Romany artifacts

- Location within Lincolnshire
- Established: 25 February 1995
- Location: Clay Lake Spalding Lincs PE12 6BL
- Coordinates: 52°46′21″N 0°08′35″W
- Type: Museum
- Website: gordonboswellromanymuseum.com

The Gordon Boswell Romany Museum is a collection at Clay Lake, Spalding in Lincolnshire, England. The museum was the lifetime's work of Gordon Boswell (died 27 August 2016, aged 76), who amassed a collection of artefacts, photographs, and several examples of the characteristic Gypsy wagon or Vardo. The museum also operates a number of non-Romany vehicles, including a horse-drawn hearse.

== Background ==
Building bridges to the non-Romany community was a tradition in Boswell's family. His great-grandfather had been an important source of information on Romany traditions and language for Victorian academics including George Borrow. Gordon Boswell's father Sylvester published in 1970 a best-selling autobiography, The Book of Boswell, which portrayed the Romany life. Gordon Boswell gradually collected waggons, carts, and other artefacts of Romany life over many years. The museum that resulted was opened on 25 February 1995.

== Access ==
The museum is open on Fridays, Saturdays, Sundays and Bank Holidays from 11:00 a.m. to 4:00 p.m. from, roughly, Easter (Good Friday) to the last weekend in September each year. There is access to all exhibits for the disabled. An admission fee is charged. The museum uses one of the wagons for organised trips in the nearby Fenland.

== See also ==
- Vardo (Romani wagon)
- Romanichal
