= Chain Bridge Forge, Spalding =

19th-century blacksmith's workshop in Lincolnshire, England

Coordinates: 52°47′25″N 0°08′41″W

Chain Bridge Forge
- Website: Chain Bridge Forge

Chain Bridge Forge

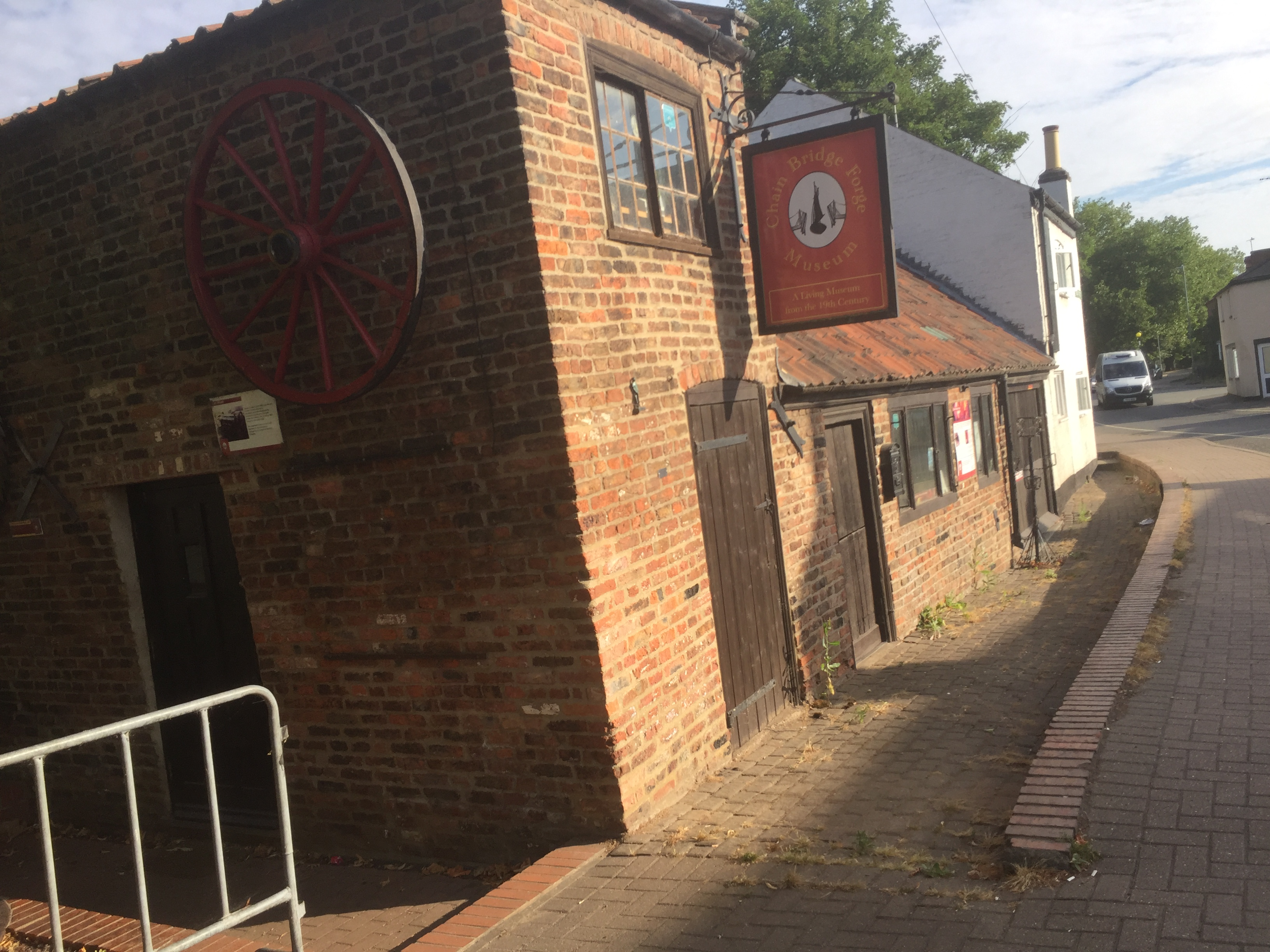

Chain Bridge Forge is an early 19th-century blacksmith's workshop, on High Street, Spalding, Lincolnshire, England.

The forge, on the south bank of the River Welland, has been transformed into a living museum, where visitors can learn about Spalding's history, blacksmithing and the Forge through displays, guides and videos. There are also opportunities to try blacksmithing, watch demonstrations and buy iron-forged products.

The Forge is believed to have been purpose-built as a blacksmith's forge in the first half of the 19th century, when it was owned and run by Francis South. The Forge derives its name from the foot-bridge which crosses the Welland next to the building, and which was originally made of chains. Watercolours by Hilkiah Burgess in the Spalding Gentlemen's Society collection indicate that it was a draw bridge, designed to enable boats and barges to navigate up river from the Wash. At this time there was a working port at Spalding, and the accounts for the period 1850-1860 show that the blacksmith of Chain Bridge Forge was servicing the boats here.

In 1899, the forge came into the possession of George Dodd and remained in the family for three generations. During this period, it predominately serviced the community by shoeing horses and doing agricultural repairs. The twentieth century saw a steady decline in the blacksmith's role, and adapting to this change Geoffery Dodd, George Dodd's grandson, spent much of his career designing and building the frames for floats in Spalding's Flower Parade.

In the 1980s, as Dodd neared retirement and with the building in a poor state of repair, he approached the South Holland District Council. After two years of discussions, the site was purchased from him by the council for the nominal fee of £1, on 20 September 1988. The building was restored in 1991 with the assistance of English Heritage, by the Spalding builders R. G. Sharman, on behalf of the District Council.

In 2011, the Friends of Chain Bridge Forge were formed to lead a new project to turn the Forge into a museum and heritage centre. As part of a campaign to raise awareness of the building and the project, the Friends, with the assistance of South Holland District Council who still own and manage the property, opened the Forge to the public during the Spalding Flower Parade in 2011.
