= Throckenholt =

Village in Lincolnshire, England

Coordinates: 52.665465°N 0.000965°E

- Location within Lincolnshire
- OS grid reference: TF354094
  - London: 85 mi (137 km) S
- Civil parish: Sutton St Edmund
- District: South Holland
- Shire county: Lincolnshire
- Region: East Midlands
- Country: England
- Sovereign state: United Kingdom
- Post town: SPALDING
- Postcode district: PE12
- Police: Lincolnshire
- Fire: Lincolnshire
- Ambulance: East Midlands
- UK Parliament: South Holland and the Deepings

Throckenholt is a village in the civil parish of Sutton St Edmund (where the population is listed) in the South Holland district of Lincolnshire, England. It is located close to the border of Cambridgeshire about 16 miles (26 km) south-east of Spalding, 14 miles (23 km) west of Wisbech and 10 miles (16 km) south of Holbeach.

The Museum of Technology, The Great War and WWII is in the village and opened its doors in 2016.

Throckenholt Priory was sited here, it was a hermitage and chapel in existence from at least 1107–1540. It was granted to Thorney Abbey by Nigel, Bishop of Ely.

Throckenholt was written as 'Trokenholt' in the 1240 Papal Rolls.
