= Whisby Moor =

Small moorland in Lincolnshire, England

Whisby Nature Park
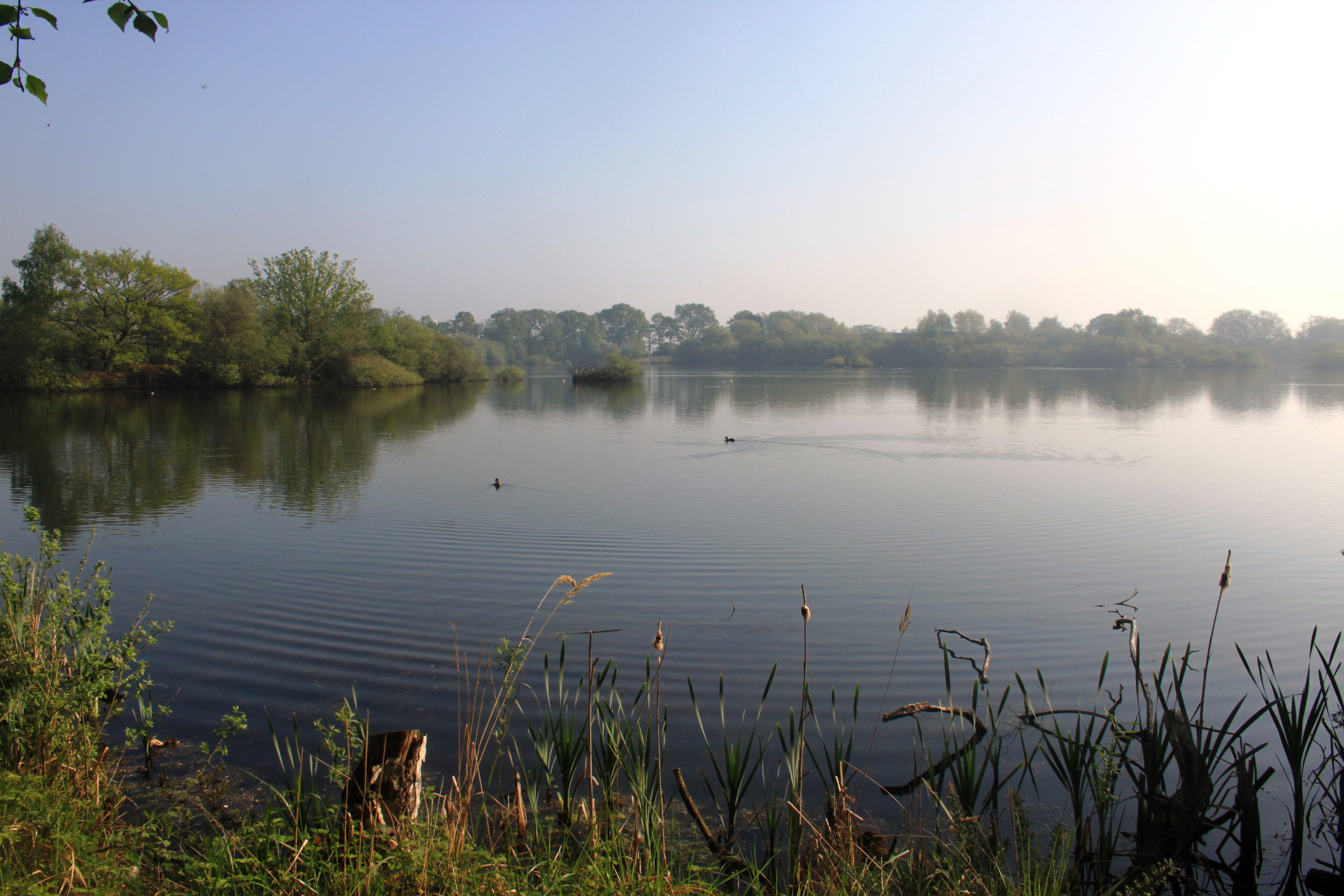
- Lake at Whisby Moor

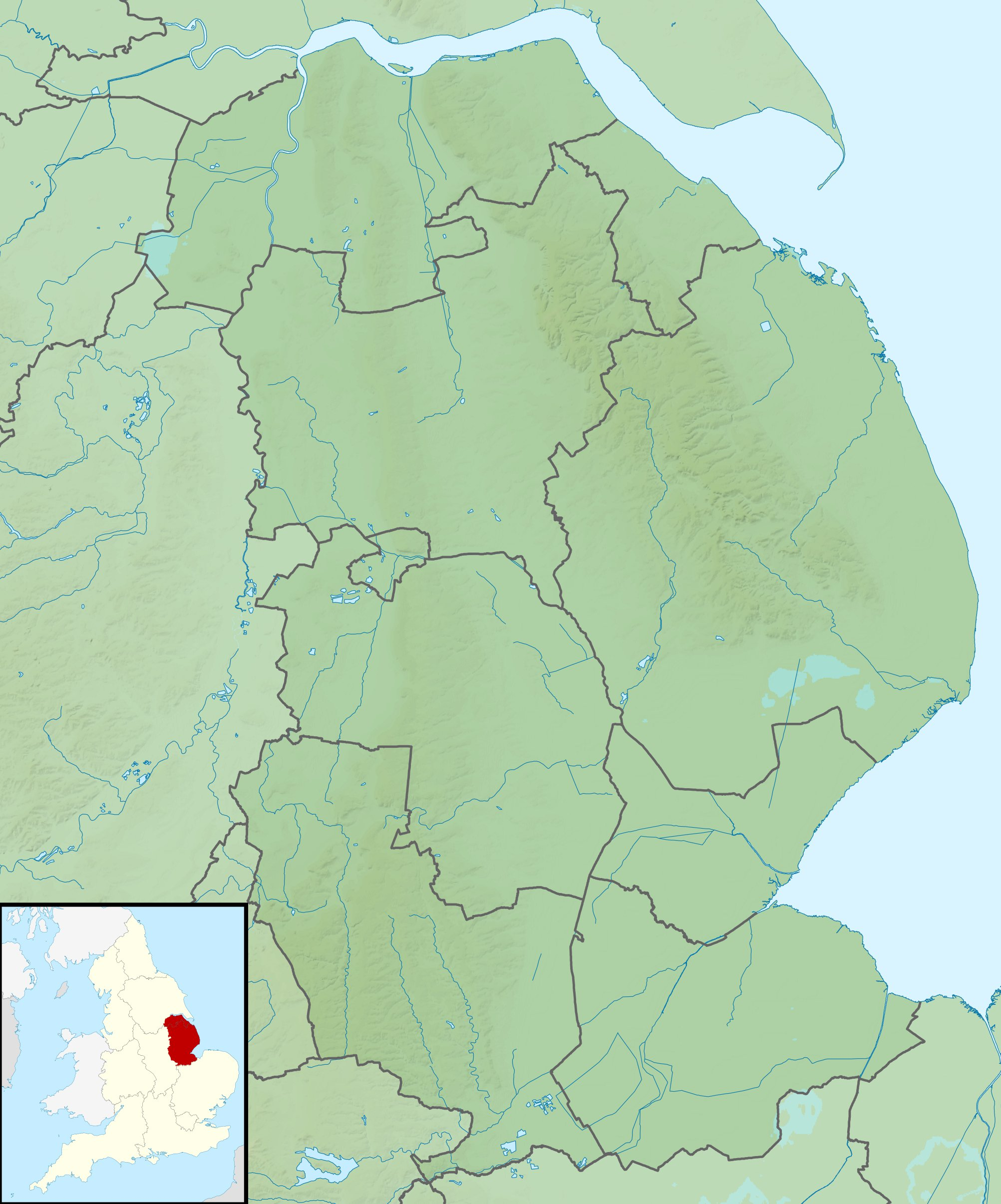
- Location within Lincolnshire
- Location: North Kesteven, Lincolnshire, England
- Nearest city: Lincoln
- Coordinates: 53°11′N 0°37′W
- Operator: North Kesteven District Council

Whisby Moor is a small moor situated close to the A46 road, west of North Hykeham, in the North Kesteven district of Lincolnshire, England.

== Geography ==
Whisby Moor is situated geographically 5 miles (8 km) south-west from Lincoln city centre, with the village of Whisby less than 1 mile (1.6 km) to the north-west. The Nottingham-Lincoln Line runs through the Moor. The southern part of the Moor, including the Natural World Centre is in the parish of Thorpe on the Hill.

== Whisby Nature Park ==
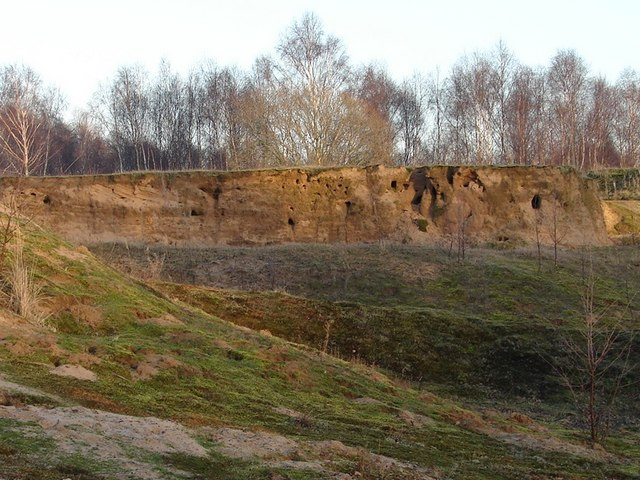
sand martin colony at Whisby Nature Park, photographed in 2008

Former sand and gravel pits have been filled and turned into mesotrophic lakes, surrounded by wet willow scrub and now form part of Whisby Nature Park. The nature reserve was established in 1985. The park opened in 1989 on either side of the Nottingham to Lincoln railway line. It was designated a Local Nature Reserve in 2002.

The park has breeds of Shetland cattle and is home to a variety of bird species including wigeon, teal, tufted duck, pochard and goldeneye, great crested grebes, mallard and kingfisher, which can be observed from several bird hides. Whisby holds a substantial population of nightingales, which have become synonymous with the reserve. The park is also home to the Hazel Pot Beetle, a leaf beetle of the Cryptocephalinae subfamily; it was released into the park in November 2000. Plants include Dactylorhiza praetermissa, Trifolium arvense and a bicolour form of Cytisus scoparius.

A visitor centre has been established at Whisby nature reserve, known as the Natural World Centre and is run on behalf of North Kesteven District Council. The nature reserve hosts training courses, talks and events for children.

Many unusual animals and plants are found in Whisby. For example, in 2018 large numbers of bird watchers were attracted to the reserve to see a melanistic blue tit. Not all parts of the nature reserve are open to the public and some areas are grazed by cattle and sheep to promote the growth of smaller plants. In 2017 The Guardian included Whisby Nature Park in a list of five of the best birdwatching sites in the UK, particularly as a place to hear nightingales.
