= Vardo (Romani wagon) =

Traditional horse-drawn wagon of the Romanichal

An open-lot bowtop vardo (2012)

A vardo (also Romani wag(g)on, Gypsy wagon, living wagon, caravan, van and house-on-wheels) is a four-wheeled horse-drawn vehicle traditionally used by travelling Romanichal as their home.

The name vardo is a Romani term believed to have originated from the Ossetic wærdon meaning cart or carriage. It is pulled by a single horse in shafts, sometimes with a second horse (called a sider or sideliner) hitched on its right side outside the shafts to help pull heavier loads or assist in pulling up a hill. The vehicle is typically highly decorated, intricately carved, brightly painted, and even gilded. The Romanichal tradition of the vardo is seen as a high cultural point of both artistic design and a masterpiece of woodcrafter's art.

The heyday of the caravan lasted for roughly 70 years, from the mid-nineteenth century through the first two decades of the twentieth century. Not used for year-round living today, they are shown at the cultural gatherings held throughout the year, the best known of which is Appleby Horse Fair in the town of Appleby-in-Westmorland in Cumbria, North West England.

== Design ==
A vardo's design includes large wheels set outside the body, whose sides slope outward considerably as they rise toward the eaves. Beyond this characteristic, the major types of caravans differ in shape, size, placement of the wheels relative to the bed, where made, and maker. The roofs of the bow-top and open-lot types are canvas stretched over curved wooden frames; the others are roofed in wood. By the mid-nineteenth century, the designs were almost entirely standardized, and some features are common to all types. The door is almost always in the front.

The small cast-iron cooking stove was invented in America and was available there and in Great Britain from about 1830 on and is a common fixture of the wagons. A cooking stove necessitates a chimney to vent smoke. A caravan's chimney is always on its left side as viewed from its front doorway; as the caravan travels along the left side of the road, the chimney is in less danger from low-hanging tree limbs in that position. The stove rests in a wooden fireplace.

The wagon's interior is typically outfitted with built-in seats, cabinets, a wardrobe, bunks in the rear of the caravan, a chest of drawers, and a glass-fronted china cabinet. There are windows on the left side and rear. Some types have clerestory windows which let in light and air. A bracket for an oil lamp is mounted over the chest of drawers opposite the fireplace; the chest's top functions as a table. Wagons' exteriors can range from fairly plain to intricately carved, painted in bright colours, and sheathed in places with gold leaf.

Vardos were elaborately decorated, hand carved and ornately painted with traditional Romani symbols. Examples of famous wagon artists responsible for the early development of vardo art are Jim Berry, John Pockett, Tom Stevens, Tommy Gaskin, John Pickett, and modern artists continuing to shape this colourful tradition include Yorkie Greenwood and Lol Thompson.

Much of the wealth of the vardo was on display in the carvings, which incorporated aspects of the Romani lifestyle such as horses and dogs, as well as stock decorative designs of birds, lions, griffins, flowers, vines, and elaborate scrollwork. Carved details were often accented with gold, either painted or, in the most expensive wagons, covered with gold leaf, from 4 to 15 books' worth, as decoration. Many individual makers were identified by their particular designs.

Clerestory windows across the roof

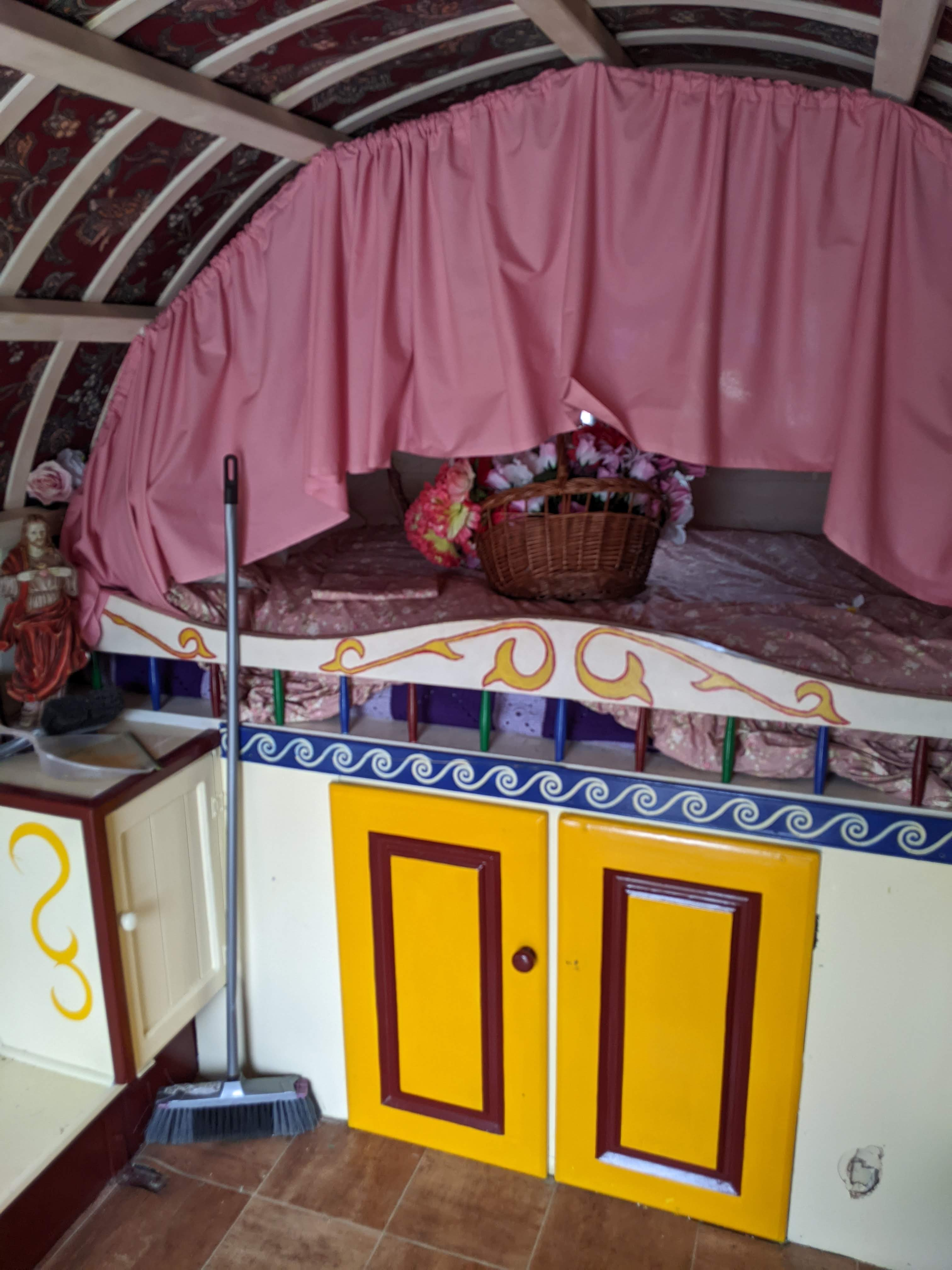
Barrel-top interior

Natural wood interior

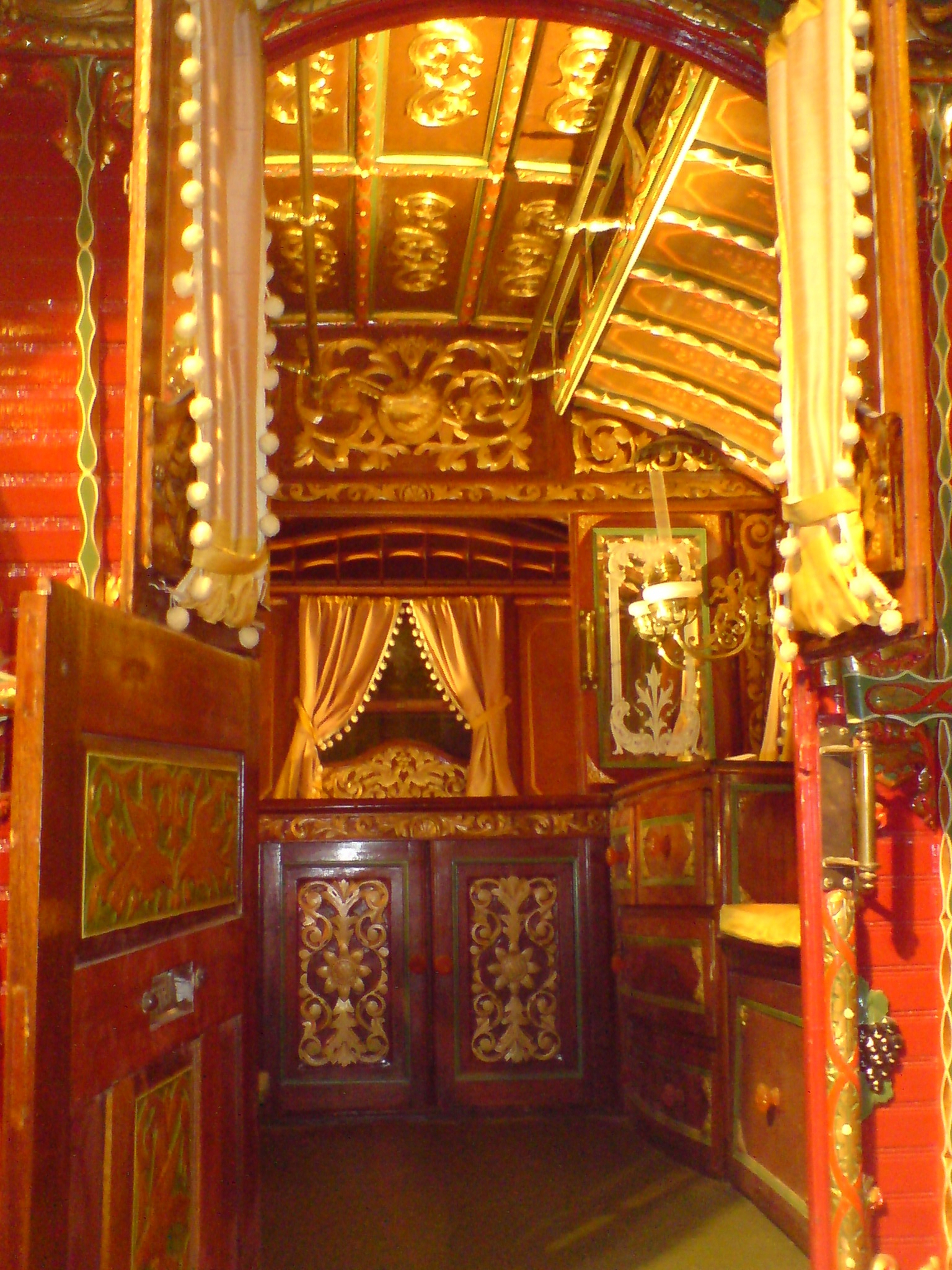
Elaborate interior

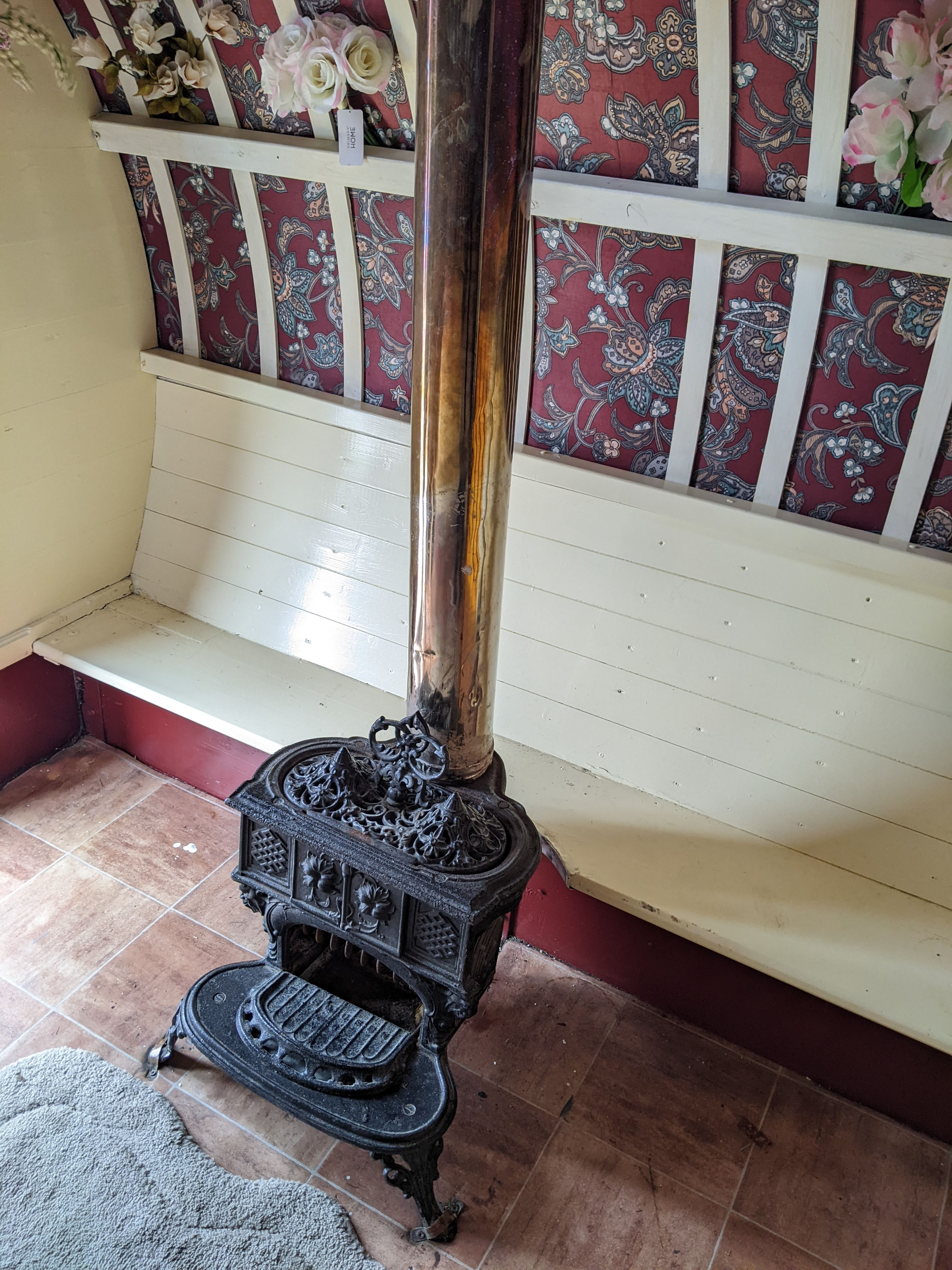
Wood stove

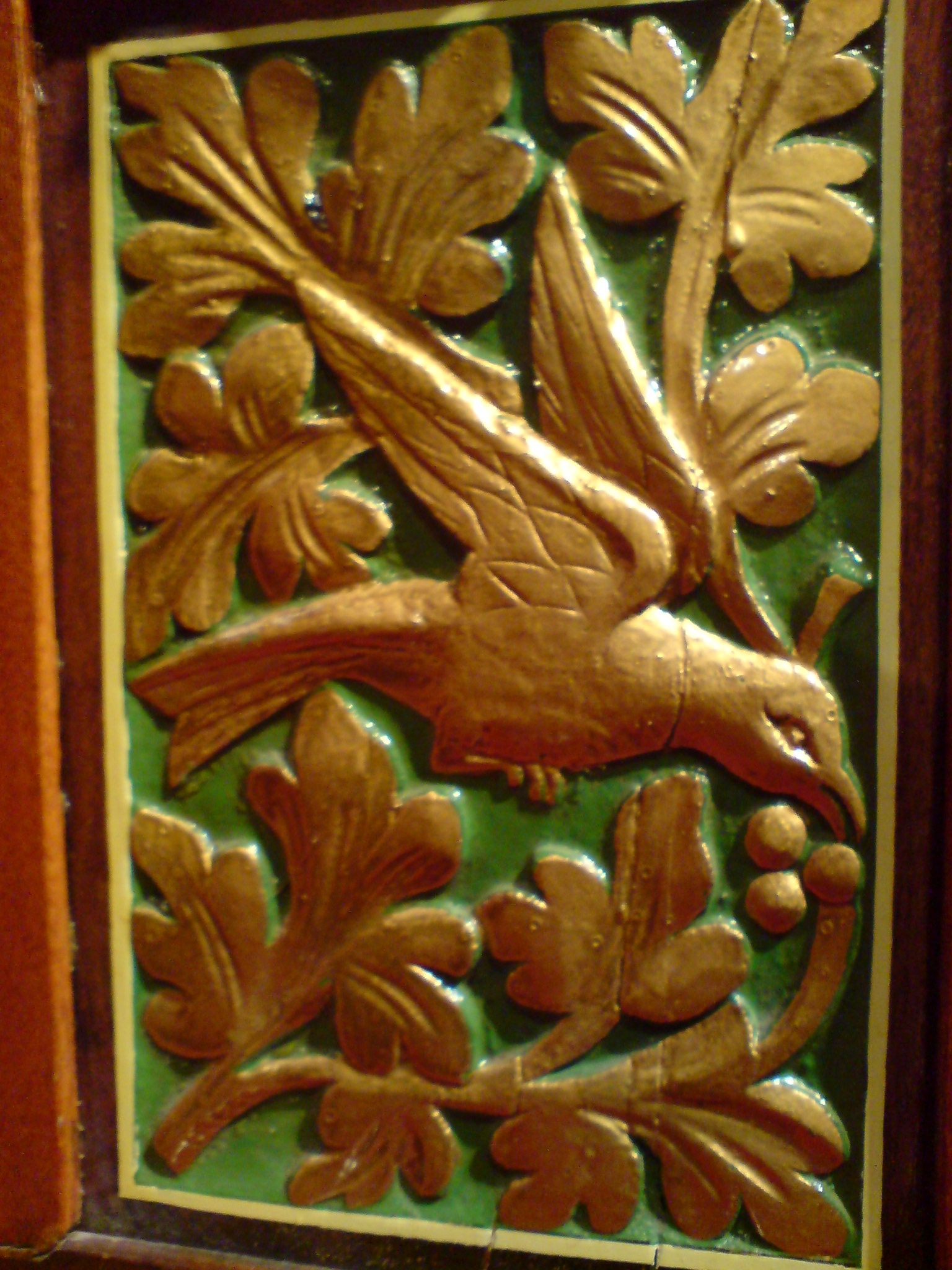
Door carving

Carvings

=== Bow top ===
A bow top wagon

Also called a barrel top wagon, the bow top has low side walls with a barrel-shaped roof of canvas or cotton duck stretched over wood "tilts" (curved bows of wood). It was traditionally painted green with teal-coloured fabric so it would blend in with a forest background. It is light enough for a single horse to pull, and is less likely to overturn in a strong wind than the straight-sided vardo designs. The front and back walls of the wagon may be elaborately decorated with paint and scrollwork. It has an open layout inside which includes a stove, table, and double bed. The open-lot variation of the bow top doesn't have a closed front wall and doors, but is open and may have a curtain for privacy. The canvas can be folded back in warm weather.

=== Burton wagon ===
Popular with Romani as well as showmen families and circus people, the Burton wagon is the oldest example of a wagon used as home in Britain. Originally undecorated, the Burton wagon evolved into an elaborate Romani vardo, but its small wheels unsuited it for off-road use.

=== Ledge wagon ===
Romanichal-style Ledge vardo

The characteristic design of the ledge or cottage-shaped wagon incorporates a more robust frame and living area that extended over the large rear wheels of the wagon. Brass brackets support the frame and solid arched roof usually 12 feet high, extended over the length of the wagon to form porches at either end and panelled with tongue in groove boards. The porch roof is further supported by iron brackets, and the walls are highly decorated with ornate scrollwork and carvings across the length of the wagon.

=== Reading wagon ===
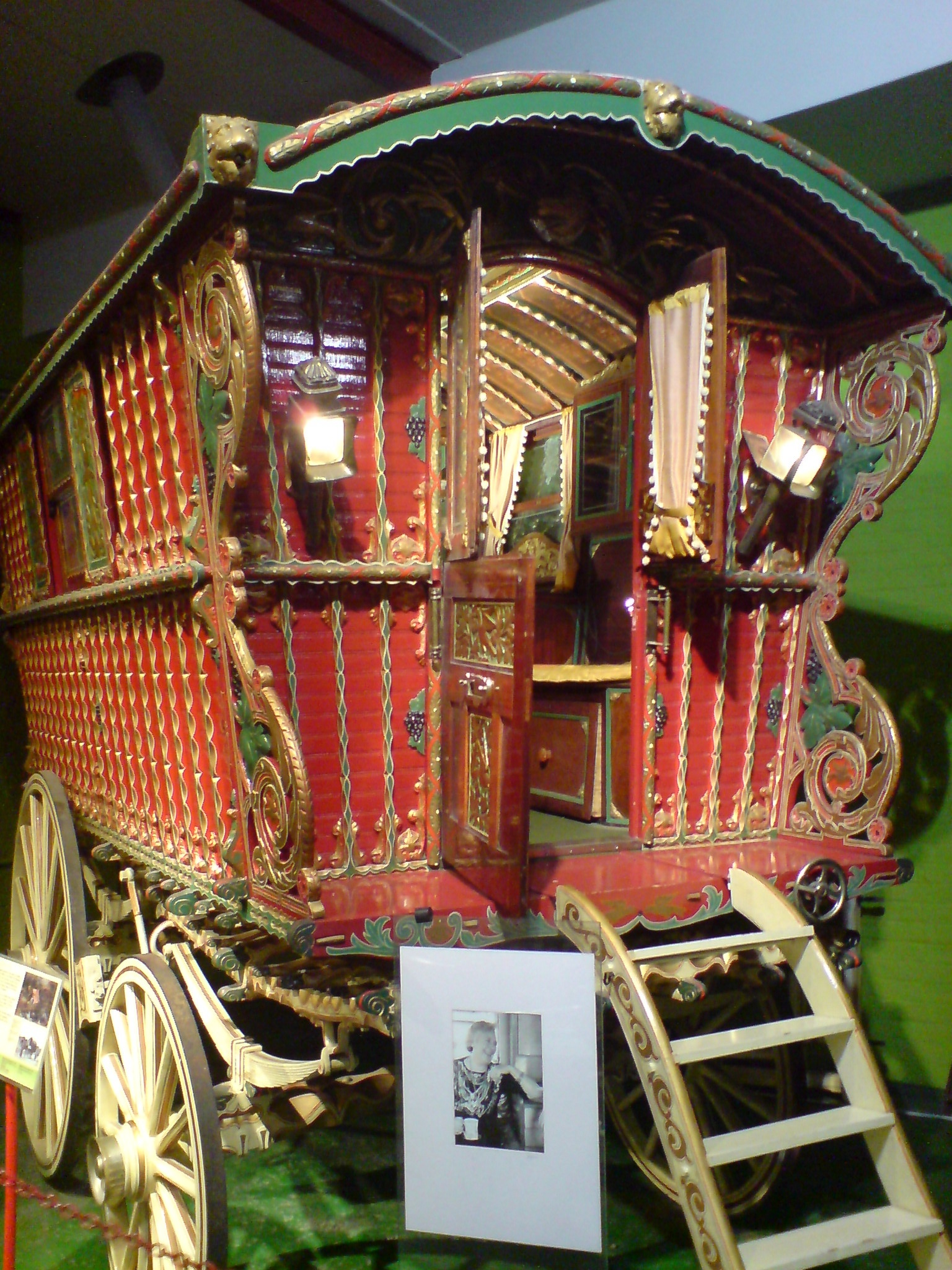
Romanichal Reading vardo

The Reading or kite wagon is so named for its straight sides that slope outwards towards the eaves, high arched wheels, and relatively light weight; there is no other vardo that so epitomises the golden age of Romani horse travel. It dates from 1870 and is synonymous with the original builder, Dunton and Sons of Reading, from where the vardo takes its name. The wagon was highly prized by the Romani for its aesthetic design, decorative beauty, and practicality to cross fords and pull off road and over rough ground, something smaller-wheeled wagons like the Burton were unable to do. The Reading wagon is 10 feet long, with a porch on the front and back. The rear wheels were 18 inches larger than the ones on the front. At the start of the 20th century the design incorporated raised skylights.

On either side of the bed space, quarter-inch thick bevelled mirrors were common and lavishly decorated. Cupboards and locker seats were built in to prevent movement whilst travelling. Side and back windows were decorated and shuttered, and the body of the vardo itself was originally made from beaded tongue-and-groove matchboard, painted red picked out in yellow and green. As with other vardos, the extent of the elaborate decoration reflected the wealth of the family, boasting such features as carved lion heads and gargoyles; these were painted gold or extensively decorated with gold leaf. Today, surviving Reading wagons are prized exhibits in museums or private collections. A fine one is in Reading Museum's Riverside Museum at Blake's Lock.

=== Brush wagon ===
The Brush wagon, or fen wagon as it was also known, is a modified standard Romani vardo. It is similar in construction to the Reading vardo, with straight sides and the wheels located outside the body, but unlike other styles, the Brush wagon has two distinct features: a half-door with glazed shutters, located at the back of the vardo, with a set of steps, both set around the opposite way from other wagons and lacked the mollycroft (skylight) on the roof. The exterior is equipped with racks and cases fitted on the outside frame and chase of the wagon allowing the owner to carry trade items like brushes, brooms, wicker chairs, and baskets. Additionally, three light iron rails ran around the entire roof, used for stowing bulkier goods, and sometimes trade-name boards. The wagons were elaborately and colourfully painted.

== Historical context ==
A Burton style vardo from the early 1900s

The Romanichal began to live in vardos around 1850. Prior to that, they travelled in tilted carts or afoot and slept either under or in these carts or in small tents. Originally Romanichal would travel on foot, or with light, horse-drawn carts, typical of other Romani groups or would build "bender" tents; so called because they were made from supple branches which they bent inwards to support a waterproof covering. The heyday of the Romani caravan was the latter part of the 19th century.

Initially using cheap or castoff horses to draw their chimneyed living wagons, the Romanichal gradually created their own breed of horse, the Gypsy horse.

Wagons were first used as a form of living accommodation (as opposed to carrying people or goods) in France in 1810 by non-Romani circus troupes. Large transport wagons combined storage space and living space into one vehicle, and were pulled by teams of horses. By the 19th century wagons became smaller, reducing the number of horses required, and around the mid-to-late-19th century (1840–1870), Romanichal in Britain started using wagons that incorporated living spaces on the inside, and added their own characteristic style of decoration. In The Old Curiosity Shop (ch. xxvii), Charles Dickens described Mrs. Jarley's well-appointed van:

One half of it...was carpeted, and so partitioned off at the further end as to accommodate a sleeping-place, constructed after the fashion of a berth on board ship, which was shaded, like the windows, with fair white curtains... The other half served for a kitchen, and was fitted up with a stove whose small chimney passed through the roof. It also held a closet or larder, several chests, a great pitcher of water, and a few cooking-utensils and articles of crockery. These latter necessaries hung upon the walls, which in that portion of the establishment devoted to the lady of the caravan, were ornamented with such gayer and lighter decorations as a triangle and a couple of well-thumbed tambourines.

These smaller wagons were called "vardo" in the Romani language (originating from the Ossetic word vordón, meaning wagon).

=== Funeral rites ===
The Romanichal funeral rite during the wagon time of the 19th and 20th century included burning the wagon and belongings after the owner's death. The custom was that nothing whatsoever would have been sold, though some of the deceased's possessions, jewellery, china, or money would be left to the family. The rest, including the wagon, was destroyed.

== Modern usage ==
Caravans at Appleby Horse Fair

The Romani travellers proudly clung to their decorative vardos through the 1920s, although the economics of their way of life was in upheaval by the contraction in the horse-trading industry and their changes from their traditional crafts. In the present day, Romanichal are more likely to live in caravans. It was estimated that by 1940 only about 1% of Romani travellers still lived in the traditional horse-drawn vardo.

Today's Romanichal still attend horse fairs, the best known of which is Appleby Horse Fair in the town of Appleby-in-Westmorland in Cumbria, North West England. Some attendees of the fairs travel there in the traditional manner via horse-drawn vardos. The American photographer John S. Hockensmith documented such a journey in 2004, travelling with and photographing the Harker family's 60-mile journey to Appleby in bow-top living wagons.

=== Other uses ===
The British writer Roald Dahl acquired a traditional vardo in the 1960s which was used as a playhouse for his children; later he used the vardo as a writing room, in which he wrote Danny, the Champion of the World.

== See also ==
- Wagon
- Shepherd's hut
- Van-dwelling
- Recreational vehicle
- Mobile home
- Tiny-house movement
- Gordon Boswell Romany Museum
