= List of waterways in Lincolnshire =

This is a list of waterways within the county of Lincolnshire.

== A ==
Name	Alternative Name(s)	Length (km)	Basin (km^{2})	Source	Source Elevation (m)	Mouth	Mouth Elevation (m)	Discharge at mouth m^{3}/s (average)	Discharge at mouth m^{3}/s (maximum)	Notes	Image
All Hallows Drain		4.4		Horsington		Catchwater Drain, Stixwould					
New River Ancholme	River Ancholme	27		Bishopbridge	6	South Ferriby, Humber estuary	0			The New River Ancholme is the artificial drainage channel. The Old River Ancholme is the natural water course, some of which has been completely superseded.	The old River Ancholme in Brigg
Old River Ancholme	River Ancholme			West Firsby	37	South Ferriby, Humber estuary	0			The New River Ancholme is the artificial drainage channel. The Old River Ancholme is the natural water course, some of which has been completely superseded.	River Ancholme at Toft next Newton

== B ==
Name	Alternative Name(s)	Length (km)	Basin (km^{2})	Source	Source Elevation (m)	Mouth	Mouth Elevation (m)	Discharge at mouth m^{3}/s (average)	Discharge at mouth m^{3}/s (maximum)	Notes	Image
River Bain	Horncastle Canal, Horncastle Navigation, Old River Bain			Ludford	130	River Witham	1				River Bain at Red Mill Bridge, Haltham
Barlings Eau				Cold Hanworth		River Witham, Short Ferry	2				At Barlings Abbey
Billinghay Skirth				Billinghay		River Witham, Tattershall Bridge			Formed by the confluence of other streams/drains		
Blue Gowt Drain				Pode Hole		River Glen, Surfleet					
Bourne Eau				Bourne		River Glen, Tongue End					In Bourne
River Brant		23	138	Gelston	60	River Witham, South Hykeham	5				At Blackmoor Bridge
Bucknall Beck				Bucknall		Engine Drain/River Witham, Southery					

== C ==
Name	Alternative Name(s)	Length (km)	Basin (km^{2})	Source	Source Elevation (m)	Mouth	Mouth Elevation (m)	Discharge at mouth m^{3}/s (average)	Discharge at mouth m^{3}/s (maximum)	Notes	Image
Catchwater Drain	Great Drain, Minting Beck			Great Sturton		River Witham, Stixwould					Mouth at the River Witham
Crofts Drain				Woodhall Spa		Kirkstead Engine Drain, Kirkstead				Runs parallel to The Sewer	

== D ==
Name	Alternative Name(s)	Length (km)	Basin (km^{2})	Source	Source Elevation (m)	Mouth	Mouth Elevation (m)	Discharge at mouth m^{3}/s (average)	Discharge at mouth m^{3}/s (maximum)	Notes	Image
Daubeney's Beck				Thimbleby		Monk's Drain, Poolham					
Dorrington Dike	Digby Dam			Dorrington		Billinghay Skirth, Billinghay					

== E ==
Name	Alternative Name(s)	Length (km)	Basin (km^{2})	Source	Source Elevation (m)	Mouth	Mouth Elevation (m)	Discharge at mouth m^{3}/s (average)	Discharge at mouth m^{3}/s (maximum)	Notes	Image

== F ==
Name	Alternative Name(s)	Length (km)	Basin (km^{2})	Source	Source Elevation (m)	Mouth	Mouth Elevation (m)	Discharge at mouth m^{3}/s (average)	Discharge at mouth m^{3}/s (maximum)	Notes	Image
Foss Dyke	Fossdyke			Brayford Pool, Lincoln		River Trent, Torksey				Roman Canal	
River Freshney				Beelsby		North Sea, Grimsby Docks	0				Alexandra Dock

== G ==
Name	Alternative Name(s)	Length (km)	Basin (km^{2})	Source	Source Elevation (m)	Mouth	Mouth Elevation (m)	Discharge at mouth m^{3}/s (average)	Discharge at mouth m^{3}/s (maximum)	Notes	Image
River Glen				Boothby Pagnall and Ropsley		River Welland, Surfleet	0			Splits into the East and West Glen Rivers	Near Guthram Gowt
River Gwash				Knossington, Leicestershire		River Welland, Stamford					At Belmesthorpe, Rutland

== H ==
Name	Alternative Name(s)	Length (km)	Basin (km^{2})	Source	Source Elevation (m)	Mouth	Mouth Elevation (m)	Discharge at mouth m^{3}/s (average)	Discharge at mouth m^{3}/s (maximum)	Notes	Image
Haltham Beck				Low Hammeringham		River Bain, Kirkby on Bain					
Hemingby Beck				Asterby		River Bain, Hemingby					
Humber estuary	The Humber, River Humber	62	24,240	Trent Falls	0	North Sea	0	250	1500		Humber Bridge

== I ==
Name	Alternative Name(s)	Length (km)	Basin (km^{2})	Source	Source Elevation (m)	Mouth	Mouth Elevation (m)	Discharge at mouth m^{3}/s (average)	Discharge at mouth m^{3}/s (maximum)	Notes	Image

== K ==
Name	Alternative Name(s)	Length (km)	Basin (km^{2})	Source	Source Elevation (m)	Mouth	Mouth Elevation (m)	Discharge at mouth m^{3}/s (average)	Discharge at mouth m^{3}/s (maximum)	Notes	Image
Kirkstead Abbey Drain				Kirkstead		Kirkstead Engine Drain, Kirkstead					
Kirkstead Engine Drain				Kirkstead		Kirkstead Mill Beck, Kirkstead				Runs parallel to River Witham.	
Kirkstead Mill Beck				Kirkstead		River Witham, Kirkstead					

== L ==
Name	Alternative Name(s)	Length (km)	Basin (km^{2})	Source	Source Elevation (m)	Mouth	Mouth Elevation (m)	Discharge at mouth m^{3}/s (average)	Discharge at mouth m^{3}/s (maximum)	Notes	Image
Long Eau			22.3	Legbourne		Great Eau, Theddlethorpe	0				At Carlton Grange, Saltfleetby St Peter
River Lymn	Steeping River, Wainfleet Relief Channel, Wainfleet Haven, Burgh Sluice Relief Channel			Belchford	91	North Sea, Gibraltar Point	0			Thought to be the river written about in Alfred, Lord Tennyson's The Brook.	In the Lincolnshire Wolds

== M ==
Name	Alternative Name(s)	Length (km)	Basin (km^{2})	Source	Source Elevation (m)	Mouth	Mouth Elevation (m)	Discharge at mouth m^{3}/s (average)	Discharge at mouth m^{3}/s (maximum)	Notes	Image
Mill Drain				Tattershall Thorpe Parish		River Witham, Tattershall				Runs parallel to River Witham.	
Miningsby Beck				Asgarby		Haltham Beck, Wood Enderby					
Monk's Drain	Poolham Beck			Thimbleby		Catchwater Drain, Stixwould					

== N ==
Name	Alternative Name(s)	Length (km)	Basin (km^{2})	Source	Source Elevation (m)	Mouth	Mouth Elevation (m)	Discharge at mouth m^{3}/s (average)	Discharge at mouth m^{3}/s (maximum)	Notes	Image
River Nene		161	1634	Badby, Northamptonshire		North Sea, The Wash, Sutton Bridge	0				At Tycho Wing's Channel
New River				Crowland		River Welland, Little London, Spalding					
North Forty Foot Drain	Lodowick's Drain			Chapel Hill	0	South Forty Foot Drain, Boston	0				At Benton's Bridge

== O ==
Name	Alternative Name(s)	Length (km)	Basin (km^{2})	Source	Source Elevation (m)	Mouth	Mouth Elevation (m)	Discharge at mouth m^{3}/s (average)	Discharge at mouth m^{3}/s (maximum)	Notes	Image
Odd's Beck				Martin		Monk's Drain, Halstead					

== P ==
Name	Alternative Name(s)	Length (km)	Basin (km^{2})	Source	Source Elevation (m)	Mouth	Mouth Elevation (m)	Discharge at mouth m^{3}/s (average)	Discharge at mouth m^{3}/s (maximum)	Notes	Image
Pauper's Drain		9	42	Crowle		River Trent, Amcotts	0				

== R ==
Name	Alternative Name(s)	Length (km)	Basin (km^{2})	Source	Source Elevation (m)	Mouth	Mouth Elevation (m)	Discharge at mouth m^{3}/s (average)	Discharge at mouth m^{3}/s (maximum)	Notes	Image
Reeds Beck	Old Reeds Beck	9.7		Highhall Wood, Old Woodhall		Catchwater Drain, Stixwould					
River Rase		25	67	Tealby	118	River Ancholme, Bishopbridge	4	0.48			

== S ==
Name	Alternative Name(s)	Length (km)	Basin (km^{2})	Source	Source Elevation (m)	Mouth	Mouth Elevation (m)	Discharge at mouth m^{3}/s (average)	Discharge at mouth m^{3}/s (maximum)	Notes	Image
The Sewer	Woodhall Sewer	6.9		Roughton		River Witham, Kirkstead					
River Slea	Kyme Eau, Slea Navigation			West Willoughby	70	River Witham, Chapel Hill					To the west of Sleaford.
South Forty Foot Drain	Black Sluice Navigation			Guthram Gowt	0	River Witham, Black Sluice, Boston	0			Completed in 1770. Below Sea Level.	At Pointon
Stainfield Beck				South Willingham		Barlings Eau, Stainfield					
Stamford Canal				Stamford		River Welland				Canalised part of the River Welland. Dried up in parts.	Deeping St James High Locks

== T ==
Name	Alternative Name(s)	Length (km)	Basin (km^{2})	Source	Source Elevation (m)	Mouth	Mouth Elevation (m)	Discharge at mouth m^{3}/s (average)	Discharge at mouth m^{3}/s (maximum)	Notes	Image
Thunker Drain				Greetham		River Waring, Horncastle					
River Torne				Maltby, Yorkshire		River Trent, Keadby	0				
River Trent	298	10,435		Biddulph Moor, Staffordshire	275	Humber estuary, Trent Falls	0				
Tupholme Beck				Tupholme		Engine Drain/River Witham, Southery					

== U ==
Name	Alternative Name(s)	Length (km)	Basin (km^{2})	Source	Source Elevation (m)	Mouth	Mouth Elevation (m)	Discharge at mouth m^{3}/s (average)	Discharge at mouth m^{3}/s (maximum)	Notes	Image

== V ==
Name	Alternative Name(s)	Length (km)	Basin (km^{2})	Source	Source Elevation (m)	Mouth	Mouth Elevation (m)	Discharge at mouth m^{3}/s (average)	Discharge at mouth m^{3}/s (maximum)	Notes	Image
Vernatt's Drain				Pode Hole		River Welland, Surfleet	0				

== W ==
Name	Alternative Name(s)	Length (km)	Basin (km^{2})	Source	Source Elevation (m)	Mouth	Mouth Elevation (m)	Discharge at mouth m^{3}/s (average)	Discharge at mouth m^{3}/s (maximum)	Notes	Image
River Waring				Belchford	100	River Bain, Horncastle	29				Near Low Toynton
River Welland		105	1,580	Sibbertoft, Northamptonshire	157	North Sea, The Wash, Fosdyke	0			Tidal below Spalding	Stamford
West Ashby Beck				Farthorpe, West Ashby		River Bain, Furzehills					
Wispington Beck				Baumber		Catchwater Drain, Bucknall					
River Witham		132	3,817	South Witham	130	North Sea (The Wash)	0			The tidal stretch below Grand Sluice is known as The Haven.	Grand Sluice, Boston. The point when the Witham becomes the tidal Haven.

== Y ==
Name	Alternative Name(s)	Length (km)	Basin (km^{2})	Source	Source Elevation (m)	Mouth	Mouth Elevation (m)	Discharge at mouth m^{3}/s (average)	Discharge at mouth m^{3}/s (maximum)	Notes	Image
