= Transport in Lincolnshire =

Transport in the county of Lincolnshire, England

Lincolnshire is a large county in England with a sparse population distribution, which leads to problems funding all sorts of transport. The transport history is long and varied, with much of the road network still based on the Roman model, and the once extensive rail network a shadow of its former self.

== Roads ==
Being on the economic periphery of England, Lincolnshire's transport links are less well developed than many other parts of the United Kingdom. The road network within the county is dominated by single-carriageway A roads and the minor B roads rather than motorways or dual carriageways – the administrative county of Lincolnshire is one of the small number of UK counties without a motorway (the M180, the principal link between South Yorkshire and the North Sea coast, runs exclusively within the boundaries of North Lincolnshire).

Three trunk roads are located in Lincolnshire, these are maintained by National Highways, a publicly owned company that is responsible for trunk routes across England. These are the A1, A46 & A52.

Following a north–south axis, the most important route into and out of the county is the A1 (formerly the Great North Road) linking the county with London and south-east England as well as the important population centres of northern England and Scotland. The A1 is entirely a dual carriageway in Lincolnshire.

The A46 reaches across the entire county, from Newark to Grimsby. The A46 is a trunk route between the county border near Newark to Lincoln, this section of road is almost entirely a Dual Carriageway, beyond Lincoln, the A46 is maintained by the local council and is entirely single carriageway. The A57 is entirely Single Carriageway in Lincolnshire, West of the A1 it is a trunk route, East of the A1 it is maintained by the local council.

Other important routes in Lincolnshire include the A15, A16, A17 & A158. The A15 & A16 run on the north–south axis, with the A16 being nearer to the East coast. The A15 lies between the A1 and A16. Both routes are almost entirely single carriageway with small amounts of dual carriageway in built up areas. The A17 & A158 run on the east–west axis; the A158 being located north of the A17. The A17 has the most rural dual carriageway distance of any of the roads in Lincolnshire, with Dual Carriageways being present at Beckingham, Sleaford & Holbeach.

Partly because of its fast and flat (but deceptively undulating) roads, Lincolnshire has one of the worst road accident records of the UK counties (as measured in terms of road fatalities per head of population). In a national effort to cut the number of speed-related deaths and injuries, the county's residents became early guinea pigs in a programme to roll out speed cameras across the country.

=== Bus ===
Bus services within the county are also limited in number, due to the inherent economic feasibility of serving a scattered population living across an area with low population density. Many smaller villages in the county have no regular bus service, making access to a private vehicle the only practical means of living in many parts of the county. The services that do exist almost exclusively serve the large population centres (e.g. Lincoln, Grantham, Boston, Skegness, Grimsby, Cleethorpes, Scunthorpe) and mid-sized market towns (e.g. Horncastle, Gainsborough) and a number of their dormitory and commuter villages.

The main bus company in the county, Stagecoach in Lincolnshire, was bought out by Stagecoach in late 2005. Stagecoach Grimsby-Cleethorpes runs buses in North East Lincolnshire

Smaller companies like the Delaine Buses and Kimes offer local services of considerable importance. A group of five of them offer integrated services under the InterConnect banner, including dial-up requested routings.

== Rail ==
The low population density of the county means that the number of railway stations and train services is rather low considering the county's large physical size. A large number of the county's railway stations were permanently closed in the 1950s and 1960s, many following the Beeching Report of 1963.

An early closure (in 1959) was the whole of the former Midland and Great Northern Joint Railway line through Sutton Bridge, Spalding, and Bourne and west to the Midlands. No obvious alternative to this route was available, and the loss has affected development and caused road congestion ever since.

One of the first railways to close in Lincolnshire was the Earl of Ancaster's estate railway, which ran from the East Coast Main Line at Little Bytham, through the Grimsthorpe estate to Edenham. It operated until the 1870s.

A daily through train service operated between Cleethorpes and London King's Cross via Grimsby, Market Rasen and Lincoln until 1993 when it was discontinued due to issues with the length of the platforms at Lincoln not being long enough for InterCity 125 trains. This necessitated passengers changing trains at Newark North Gate when travelling to or from the capital. However, the East Coast Main Line passes through the county and so it is possible to catch direct trains to London, Leeds or Edinburgh from Grantham. In December 2008 a daily East Midlands Trains service from Lincoln to London St Pancras, via Nottingham was introduced. In the summer of 2008, a major refit of Lincoln station improved signalling and customer facilities but did little to change the platform length issue.

TransPennine Express trains from Cleethorpes run to Manchester Airport, passing through Scunthorpe and connecting to the East Coast Main Line at Doncaster before continuing via Sheffield. East Midlands Railway services between Skegness and Nottingham pass through Boston, Sleaford and Grantham.

Stamford station is served hourly with an east–west CrossCountry service between Peterborough and Leicester.

An hourly East Midlands Railway service from Norwich to Liverpool stops at Grantham.

== Airports ==
Lincolnshire has its own airport (Humberside Airport) in the north of the county at Kirmington (a former Royal Air Force bomber airfield), between Scunthorpe, Grimsby and Lincoln. Several others are fairly easily accessible by either road or rail.

- Humberside Airport (HUY)
- East Midlands Airport (EMA)
- Leeds Bradford Airport (LBA)
- Stansted Airport (STN)
- Manchester Airport (MAN)

== Canals ==
Lincolnshire is served by the Foss Dyke canal, an ancient waterway of Roman origin, which connects the River Trent and the River Witham. Brayford Pool is the inland basin in the city, once a busy transhipment point. The Witham is navigable to Boston. Access between Brayford pool and the Witham is by the Glory Hole, a low medieval bridge spanning the river. The "Air Draught" under the bridge is given as 9 feet 2 inches.

The River Ancholme is also navigable with the Caistor Canal branch (now disused), as are some of the larger drains in the Fens, such as the South Forty-Foot Drain and the Witham Navigable Drains.

The Fens Waterways Link is a scheme for waterways improvement for leisure boating. It proposes a new navigation between the South Forty-Foot Drain and the River Witham. The new lock gates at Black Sluice in Boston were officially opened in March 2009. Much work remains to be done on the Forty-foot before the dream can be realised of travelling from Lincoln to Cambridge.

The Horncastle Canal dates back to 1792, linking the town of Horncastle to the Witham and incorporating the route of the earlier Tattersal navigation. At least a century before what is normally called the Canal Age the Stamford Canal and Louth Canal were in use with modern style locks and towpath construction. Bourne and Sleaford had navigable river access until well into the 20th century and there are plans afoot to re-open the Sleaford Navigation.

The Grantham Canal ran for 33 miles (53 km) from Grantham through 18 locks to West Bridgford, where it joined the River Trent. It is currently under restoration.
