= Forty Foot Drain =

Drainage channels in England

Coordinates: 52.464°N 0.037°E

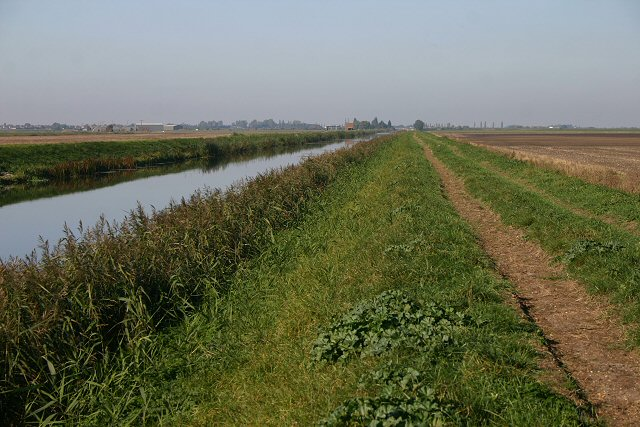
Vermuyden's Drain

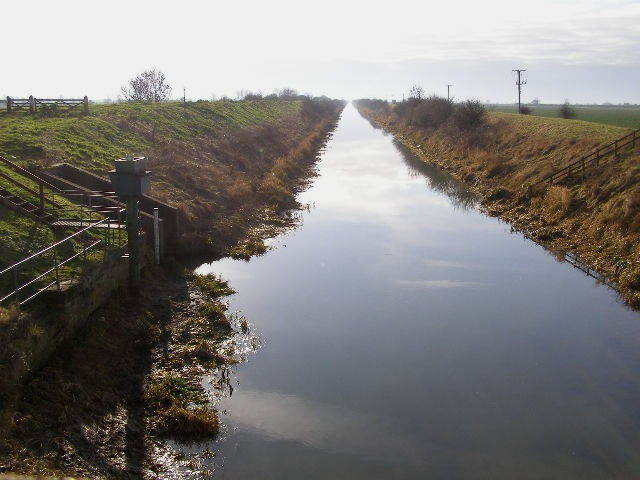
South Forty Foot Drain from Donington High Bridge

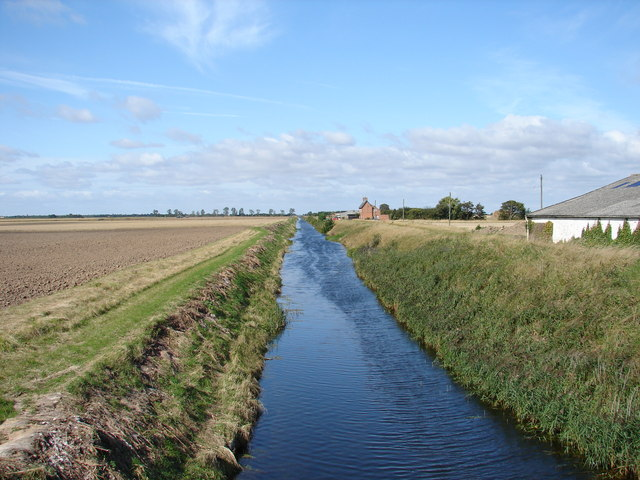
North Forty Foot Drain from Benton's Bridge.

The Forty Foot or Forty Foot Drain is a name given to several of the principal channels in the drainage schemes of the Fens of Eastern England, the name being qualified when there is a need to distinguish between them. They are Vermuyden's Drain, South Forty Foot and North Forty Foot.

== The Forty Foot Drain in Cambridgeshire ==
The Forty Foot Drain, also known as Vermuyden's Drain, is an artificial drainage river in Cambridgeshire, which is one of the key elements in draining the Middle Level of the Bedford Level, in the Cambridgeshire part of the Fens. It was instrumental in Sir Cornelius Vermuyden's great drainage scheme of 1649–1653. Located near Chatteris and Ramsey, the river runs 10 1/2 miles (16.9 km), from Wells Bridge, where it joins the old River Nene, to Welches Dam Sluice, where it joins the Counter Wash Drain, which then changes identity, becoming the Old Bedford River. These junctions are at grid references TL300880 and TL470858 respectively. When the drain was newly made, its western end was in Huntingdonshire. The waters of the Forty Foot Drain no longer discharge through Welches Dam Sluice. Instead they flow via the Sixteen Foot Drain to Three Holes and thence via the Middle Level Main Drain and the pumping station at Wiggenhall St Germans to the sea. The Sixteen Foot Drain connects to the Forty Foot drain above Horseway Lock.

== Forty Foot Drains in Lincolnshire ==
The main land drain in Holland Fen (as distinct from the River Witham, which is designed to carry water past the fens without being part of them) is known as the North Forty Foot Drain. That of the Black Sluice fens is the South Forty-Foot Drain. The latter flows, with some pump assistance, from Bourne North Fen, close to the River Glen, to the Haven at Boston. The North Forty Foot joins the South Forty Foot in the western outskirts of Boston and together their waters enter the Haven through the Black Sluice.

=== North Forty Foot Drain ===
According to Wheeler:

Also called Lodowick's Drain. A drain in Holland Fen, running parallel with the Witham, and extending from Chapel Hill to the South Forty Foot at Boston. Formerly emptied into the Witham at Lodowick's or Trinity Gowt." "Lodowick' or Lodovick's Gowt. The outfall of the North Forty-Foot Drain, situated on the west side of the old channel of the Witham, about 1/4 mile [400 m] above Boston Church. It had a waterway of 15 feet [4.6 m]. Was also called Trinity Gowt.

The drain gives its name to the village of North Forty Foot Bank.

=== South Forty Foot Drain ===
The main drain in the Black Sluice District, extending from Boston Haven to Gutheram Cote (sc. modern Guthram Gowt). This drain was first cut by the Adventurers who drained the Lindsey Level in the middle of the 17th century. It was afterwards opened out and improved under the Black Sluice Drainage and Navigation Act 1765.

The present sluice was erected under the Black Sluice Drainage Act 1846 (9 & 10 Vict. c. ccxcvii) and has three openings of a total waterway of sixty feet.

== See also ==
- Cornelius Vermuyden
