= Horsington =

Horsington may refer to:

- Horsington, Lincolnshire, England
- Horsington, Somerset, England
- Ted Horsington (1878–1947), Australian politician
