= Black Sluice =

Coordinates: 52.966603°N 0.025881°W

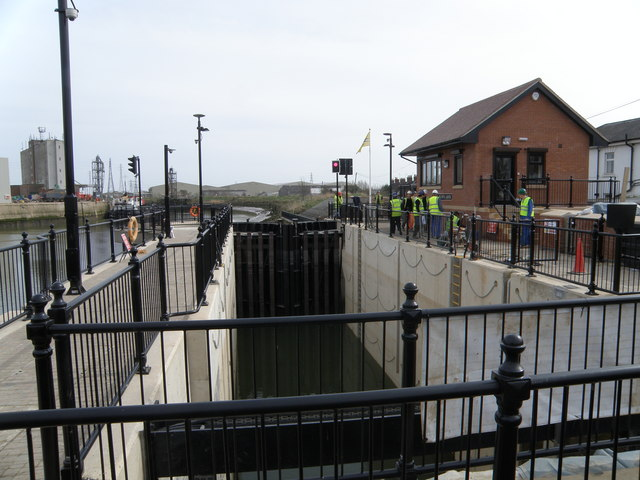
The new lock at the Black Sluice

The Black Sluice is the name given to the structure that controls the flow of the South Forty-Foot Drain into The Haven, at Boston, Lincolnshire, England.

== History and ownership ==
The original Black Sluice was probably the Skirbeck Sluice where Earl of Lindsey's 1635 attempt to drain what was then called the Lindsey Levels ran to the sea. The ensuing battle with the population left the works destroyed, and this seems to be the origin of the name Black Sluice. The name became associated with the area drained by the original 40 foot drain, and has been used for each successive outfall from the area, and for the name of the authority responsible for the drainage. Created in 1765 the Black Sluice Commissioners are succeeded today by the Black Sluice Internal Drainage Board and a range of interlocking boards and authorities: The Witham and Steeping Rivers Catchment Board, Lincolnshire River Board. National Rivers Authority, and now the Environment Agency.

There have been at least three Black Sluices, the latest of which incorporates the pumping station built in 1946.

== The lock ==
The lock which gave passage past the Black Sluice fell into disrepair after the second world war, but was restored to full operation in 2008 as part of the Fens Waterways Link scheme to improve navigation through the fens for pleasure craft. A formal opening of the lock was held on 20 March 2009. The new lock can handle boats up to 21 metres (69 ft) long, 6 metres (20 ft) broad, and with draught of up to 2.8 metres (9.2 ft) on the most favourable tides. While the lock itself has no airdraught restrictions, London Road Bridge, immediately upstream has limited headroom in the form of an arch at nearly 3.4 metres (11 ft) in the centre and as little as 1.7 metres (5.6 ft) at the lowest usable point. Connection to Lincoln is further restricted by the size of the lock at the Grand Sluice, which is just over 13.7 metres (45 ft) long, although longer vessels can pass through at certain states of the tide.

Black Sluice Lock is not permanently staffed, so bookings for transit need to be made a minimum of 24 hours in advance.

There is a small visitors centre at the new Lock.

== See also ==
- South Forty-Foot Drain for considerable detail about the various sluices.
- The Forty Foot drains in Lincolnshire
- Fens Waterways Link
- River Witham
- Cornelius Vermuyden
