= Fens Waterways Link =

Waterways project in eastern England

Boston to Peterborough Wetland Corridor
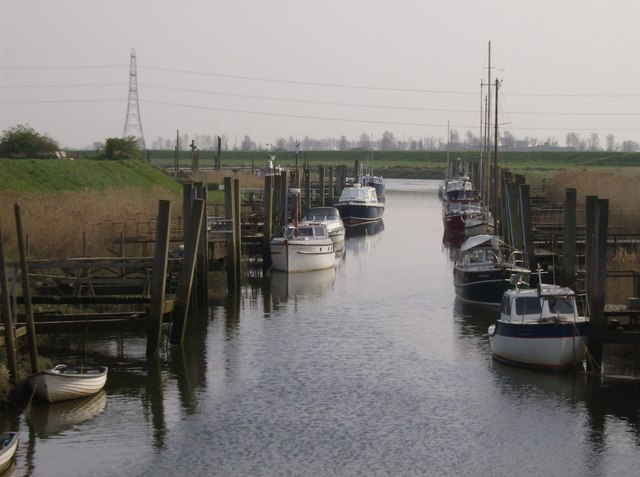
- The new Fens Waterways Link route to Spalding is from the River Glen (foreground) right into the River Welland (middle distance)

Specifications
- Status: Partially constructed
- Navigation authority: Environment Agency

History
- Former names: Fens Waterways Link

Geography
- Start point: Boston
- End point: Peterborough
- Connects to: River Witham, River Glen, River Welland, River Nene

The Fens Waterways Link is a project to improve recreational boating opportunities in the counties of Cambridgeshire and Lincolnshire, England. By a combination of improvements to existing waterways and the construction of new links a circular route between Lincoln, Peterborough, Ely and Boston is planned. The project is being organised by the Environment Agency and financed from the Regional Development Agency and the European Union.

A separate, complementary waterway is the Bedford and Milton Keynes Waterway, opening up a route for broader beam boats between The Fens and the rest of Britain's canal network.

== History ==
The idea of creating a navigable waterway between Boston and Peterborough was promoted in 2005. It was described by the Environment Agency as the biggest project for the enhancement of waterways in Europe at the time, and would make 150 miles (240 km) of waterways accessible to inland boats, without them having to venture into the Wash. Lincolnshire has a greater length of rivers than the Norfolk Broads, but whereas the Broads are hugely popular with boaters, Lincolnshire's rivers were much less so.

Initially, the main focus was on navigation, and to move the ideas forwards, Lincolnshire County Council, the Environment Agency and British Waterways formed the Lincolnshire Waterways Partnership. This acted as an umbrella organisation, with each of the partners working on projects to achieve the aim of a better connected waterways infrastructure. Schemes with a total value exceeding £20 million were implemented, the first of which was the reconnection of the South Forty-Foot Drain to The Haven by the construction of a new lock beside the Black Sluice pumping station. The schemes enabled new businesses to thrive, and resulted in significant private sector investment in related projects.

Lincolnshire County Council's involvement was outlined in a ten-year plan entitled Lincolnshire Waterways for the Future, covering the period from 2008 to 2018. As that period came to an end, they produced a Waterways Development Strategy, covering 2018 to 2028. The objectives were slightly different. While they were still trying to make the waterways more viable economically, the new strategy had a wider remit, and seeks to work with others who are also working on water-related projects. One possible collaboration is with Anglian Water, who are looking for solutions to providing an adequate public water supply as the population grows. This might include water transfers between the Trent, the Witham and the South Forty-Foot Drain to one or more new reservoirs. If these transfers use open channels, rather than pipelines, they could create waterways corridors, which would provide both habitat and navigation. By working together, such projects can address issues of the environment, flood mitigation and water security, with the costs shared so that one project meets the objectives of several organisations. The Fens Waterways Link has been rebranded as the Boston to Peterborough Wetland Corridor to reflect this change of emphasis, but navigation will still be part of the aim. The Inland Waterways Association will lead future development, working with Lincolnshire County Council and the Environment Agency.

By 2018, the scheme had been divided into six phases. Phases 1 and 2 covered the reconnection of the South Forty-Foot Drain to the Haven, and upgrading of the South Forty-Foot Drain as far a Donington High Bridge, These were completed in 2009. Phase 3 covers the 17-mile (27 km) link from Donington High Bridge to Surfleet Seas End sluice. This includes a new channel between the South Forty-Foot Drain and the River Glen. Surfleet Seas End sluice is close to where the River Glen joins the River Welland. Phase 4 is 14 miles (23 km) long, and covers the section between Surfleet and Crowland on the River Welland. Crowland is towards the upper end of the navigable Welland. Phase 5 is a new 9-mile (14 km) link between the Welland at Crowland and the River Nene near Peterborough. The Middle Level Navigations also join the Nene near Peterborough, and Phase 6 covers modifications to link them to the Old Bedford River or the New Bedford River and therefore into the River Great Ouse system. Lincolnshire's plan is not clear on how this could work, as it is outside of their administrative area, but their map shows either the re-establishment of the link through the closed Welches Dam lock, or a new channel to join the Great Ouse at Earith. They believe that the Boston to Peterborough corridor can be delivered in the short to medium term, whereas the route beyond Peterborough is more problematic.

=== Northern route ===
Starting from the north, the first development was the provision of a new tidal lock from the Haven in Boston to the South Forty-Foot Drain at the Black Sluice, opened to traffic on 20 March 2009 by Michaela Strachan. The cost of the project was £8.5 million, of which £4 million came from Lincolnshire County Council, £2.5 million from the European Regional Development Fund and £2 million from the East Midlands Regional Development Agency. At the time, phase two of the project involved widening of the South Forty-Foot Drain from Donington to a new road crossing under the A151 road, a new lock and a junction with the River Glen, a tributary of the River Welland, at Guthram Gowt. It was easier to get funding for the actual project, but more difficult to get funding to cover the preparatory work, but this problem was recognised by the East Midlands Development Agency, who funded the early stages up to and including obtaining planning permission.

The Lincolnshire Waterways Partnership originally thought that the preparatory work could be completed by March 2010. However, as the route options, the engineering challenges, the environmental considerations and the costs were considered, the scope of the project grew. It became clear that the March 2010 deadline would not be met, and so only part of the East Midlands Development Agency funding was used before their deadline ran out. The Environment Agency then began to look at whether the project could be delivered in conjunction with a flood risk management scheme for the South Forty-Foot Drain. By late 2011, eight possible routes were being considered for the link into the River Glen. The adoption of the Water Framework Directive also meant that the project needed to ensure that water quality improved, and a £150,000 grant was received, to consider how the link might create improved habitat and better water supplies. Eventually, eleven routes were considered, of which two were shortlisted. Route 1 was the original route, with a lock to get round Black Hole Drove pumping station, continuing along a widened South Forty-Foot Drain to Guthram Gowt, and then a lock into the River Glen. Route 11 also had a lock near the pumping station, but then used a new channel to reach the A151 road and a lock into the Glen. Route 1 was then discarded when a landowner changed their support for that route.

Navigation between the Glen and the Welland is currently possible, but involves passing through Surfleet sluices, which can only be done at certain limited states of the tide, making a sharp turn on a tidal river where the two rivers converge, and passage through Fulney Lock on the Welland to reach Spalding. The lock is tidal and in need of refurbishment or replacement. One possibility is the construction of a new lock and sluice structure at Surfleet, and improving Fulney Lock. A second solution is the construction of a new sluice on the Welland, 2.8 miles (4.5 km) below Fulney Lock. This would allow Fulney lock to be decommissioned, with a short new channel constructed from the Welland into Vernatt's Drain, and a second short link from Vernatt's Drain into the Glen above Surfleet Sluices. Vernatt's Drain is currently owned by the Welland and Deepings Internal Drainage Board, and so negotiation would be required to use this route. However, it is the preferred choice, as it would also reduce the amount of flood defence work required on the Welland in this locality.

In order to reach Peterborough, a new cut will be required between the Welland and the River Nene downstream of the city, near Flag Fen. Two routes are under consideration. The first would start near Peakirk pumping station, where the Folly River joins the Welland. A lock would be required to bypass the pumping station, as the water levels of the two waterways are not the same. After about 1.9 miles (3 km) the Folly River joins the Car Dyke, which follows the north-eastern edge of Peterborough to the village of Eye. An alternative route would leave the Welland at Postland pumping station, further downstream and nearer to Crowland, and follow the course of Kennulph's Drain to Kennulph Farm. From there a new section of canal would carry the route around the hamlet of Nene Terrace and link into Cat's Water Drain, which also passes close to Eye. The final part of the link would either be a new canal or would follow the remainder of Cat's Water Drain and a drainage ditch to reach Padholme pumping station. While the Folly River and Car Dyke look to be more suitable for navigation, some dredging and widening of Car Dyke would be required, and as much of this section is a scheduled monument it is thought that English Heritage would not want any work to take place on it. The preferred route therefore follows the much smaller Cat's Water Drain.

=== Southern route ===
Access to the Middle Level Navigations is along King's Dyke, which leaves the Nene a short distance downstream of where the northern route would end. Kings Dyke passes through Stanground Lock and Ashline Lock, after which Whittlesey Dyke can be used to access the old course of the River Nene at Floods Ferry. Initial plans for the Fens Waterways Link included creating a circular cruising route to the south, which would include parts of the Middle Level Navigations and of the River Great Ouse. For this to work well, some work would be required on King's Dyke, as water levels are sometimes too low for navigation. The recommended route for boats crossing the Middle Level from the Nene to the Great Ouse follows the old course of the Nene to Upwell and Outwell, and then continues along Well Creek to Salters Lode Lock. To reach the Great Ouse, boats must use Salters Lode Lock to enter the tidal section of the Great Ouse, and then use Denver Sluice to reach the non-tidal section. This transition is not easy, due to tidal levels, frequent silation below the sluice making access difficult, and the poor state of Salters Lode Lock. In order to mitigate this, one proposal was to create a short new section of canal from Well Creek and ascend through a couple of locks, to cross over the New Bedford River on an aqueduct. More locks would then drop the level so that boats could join the Great Ouse above Denver Sluice. This would avoid the need to refurbish Salters Lode Lock, and would not require boaters to negotiate the tidal river.

The Great Ouse from Denver Sluice up to Ely is not thought to need any attention, as it is wide and deep and there are no navigation structures on that length. The next section from the Fish and Duck Inn near Stretham to Hermitage Lock at Earith needs more attention, as it has suffered from a lack of funding, due to its catchment being very small. The channel is narrow in places, the banks suffer from erosion, and water levels are at times quite shallow. This would be addressed by a programme of dredging. To complete a circular route would require some way to get from Earith back to the old course of the Nene. Currently, the Forty Foot Drain, which is also known as Vermuyden's Drain, runs from Welches Dam and Horseway Lock through Chatteris to join the old course of the Nene near Ramsey. The channel between Welches Dam and Horseway Lock was always shallow, and access was restricted to certain weekends, but in 2006 the Environment Agency closed the lock at Welches Dam, and the channel has since become overgrown with reeds.

Three options were proposed to complete the circular route. One was to build an aqueduct to carry boats from Welches Dam over the Old Bedford River and into the tidal New Bedford River, which joins the Great Ouse above Hermitage Lock. The second was to build a new lock between Welches Dam and the Old Bedford River. The section above Welches Dam to the sluice at Earith would be enlarged so that it became navigable, and a new lock structure would be built to bypass Earith Sluice. The third option involved making the Twenty Foot River navigable towards Chatteris. This then becomes Fenton's Lode, and the new route would follow Fenton's Lode to High Fen pumping station. A new section of canal would run from the pumping station to a drainage ditch called Cranbrook Drain, which would be enlarged and join the Old Bedford River below Earith Sluice. Upgrading of the final section of the Old Bedford River would be required, and again, a lock structure to bypass Earith Sluice would be needed. The second route was the preferred option in 2003, although Lincolnshire County Council still showed all three routes on their 2018 plan.

=== Wider links ===
The completion of the project would be the long-discussed Bedford and Milton Keynes Waterway canal between Bedford and Milton Keynes following the course of the Great Ouse and joining the Grand Union Canal, mooted as the "first new canal in over a century". The funding for this is slowly appearing and as well as providing for the first time an inland route for broader boats—up to 3.2 metres (10 ft 6 in) wide—between the north and south of England, it would also serve as a flood relief channel for new developments in the areas through which it is to pass. This extra benefit might release funding from wider sources. Adaptation of existing locks and bridges would be necessary to increase the dimensions to Grand Union Canal gauge, both in width and air draft.

=== Precursors ===
Although using a slightly different route, there are echoes of plans made in 1809 to link the waterways. Two schemes were proposed, one which would have created a canal from Stamford to the Oakham Canal, 11 miles (18 km) due west, with a link from Stamford to the Nene at Peterborough, and a connection from near Market Deeping on the Welland, and a rival scheme to link Stamford to the Grand Junction Canal, both of which included a connection to the South Forty-Foot Drain. Both were put before Parliament in 1811, but neither met with any success. The idea was raised again in 1815 and 1828, but no further action was taken.

== Gallery ==
Proposed route

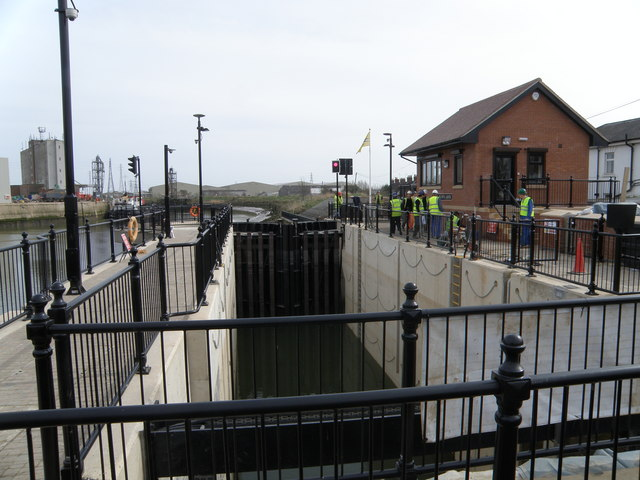
Black Sluice Lock connects the South Forty-Foot Drain to The Haven at Boston.

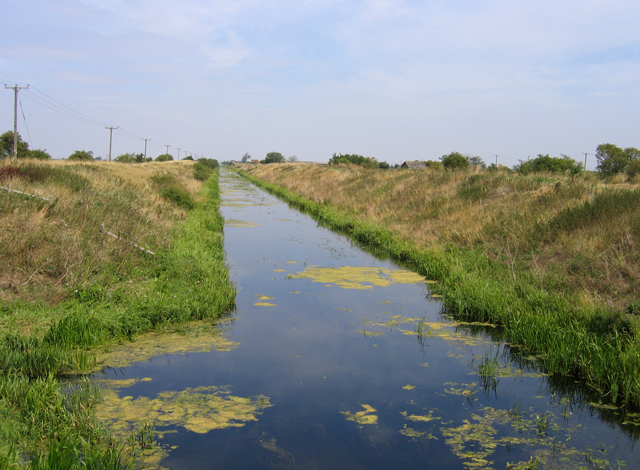
The South Forty-Foot Drain at Pointon, between Boston and Guthram Gowt. Here its origin as a drainage channel, set below the level of the surrounding fields, is very evident.

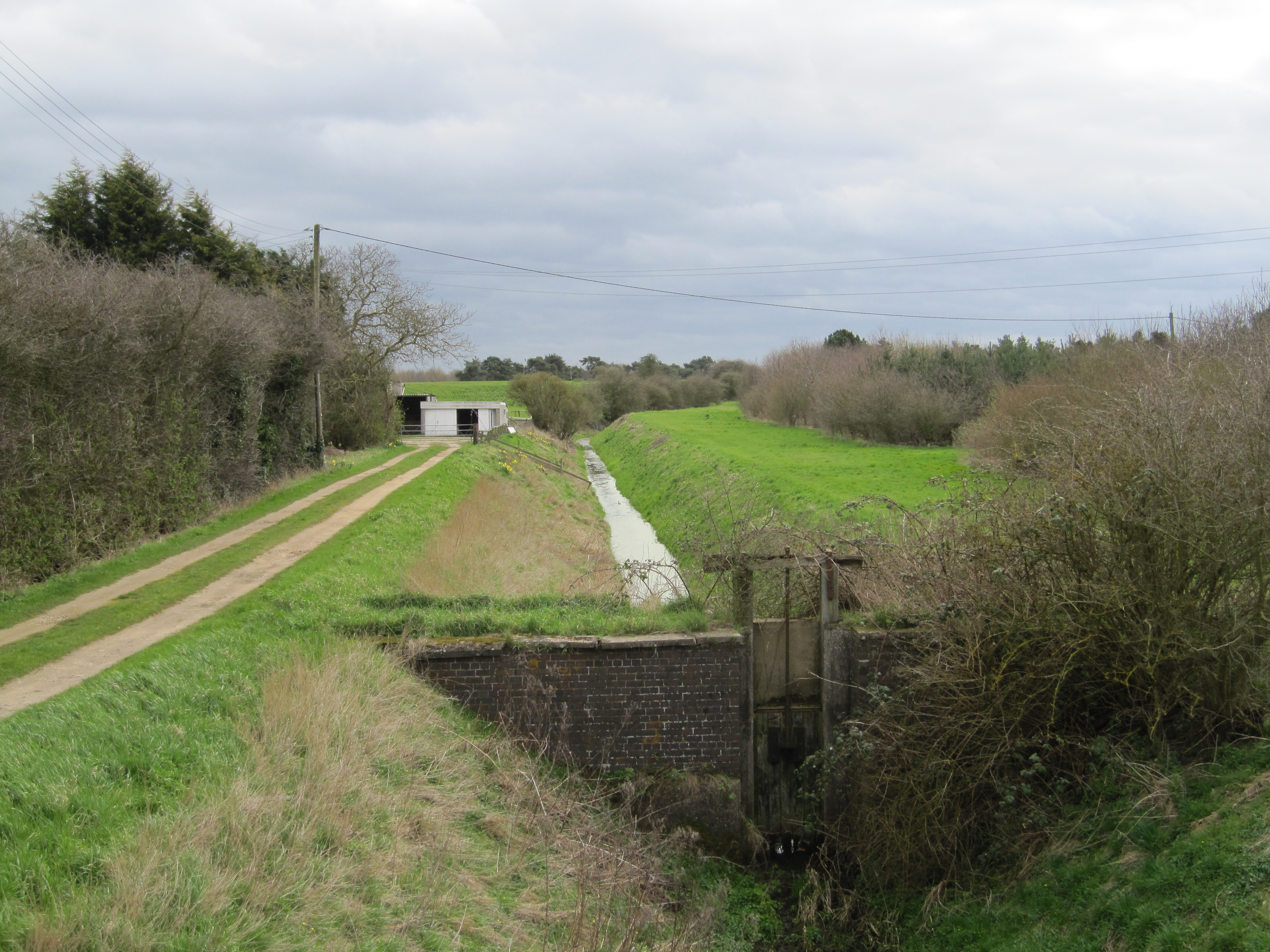
Guthram Gowt. The location of the planned lock into the Glen is probably somewhere in this photograph if route 1 is adopted.

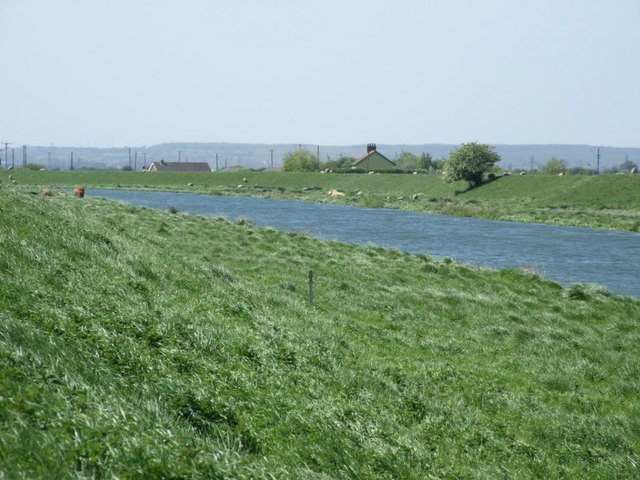
The water level in the River Glen, here pictured looking west towards Guthram Gowt, is maintained by a tidal sluice at Surfleet Seas End. The sluice might be replaced by a lock.

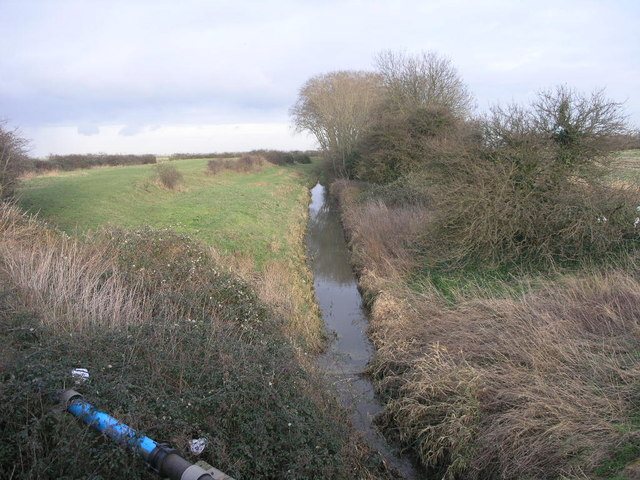
The Car Dyke near Eye could become navigable as part of the Link if problems of culverting under modern road improvements can be solved, and agreement with English Heritage can be reached.

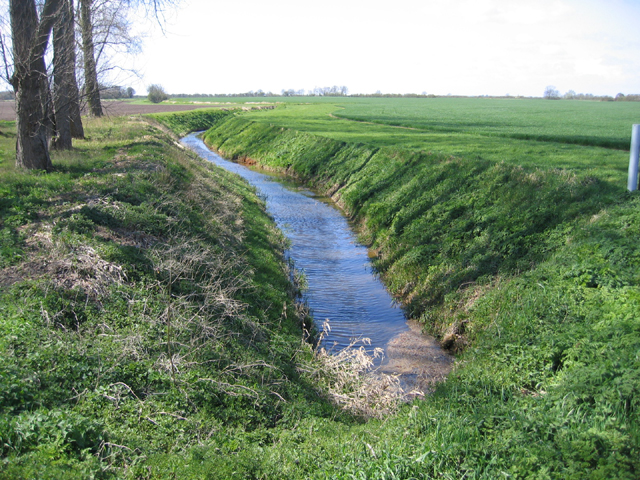
The Cat's Water Drain is under consideration as an alternative route should the Car Dyke prove unsuitable.

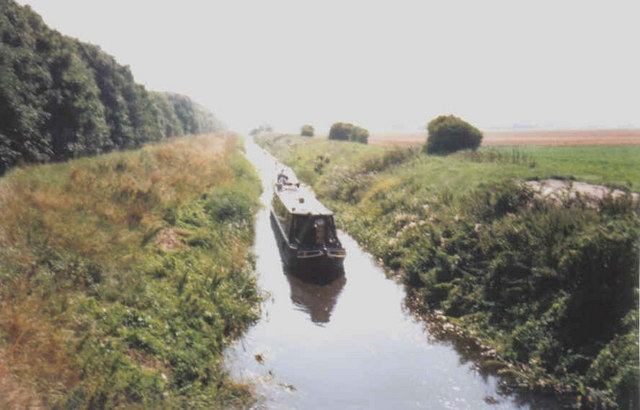
The Forty Foot Navigation in 1997. A new cut to bypass this shallow section may be constructed.

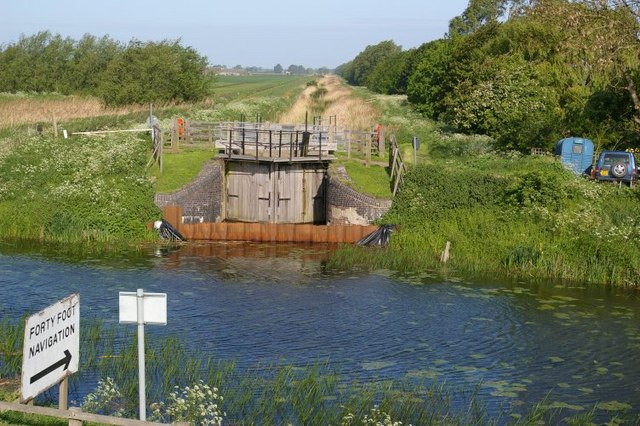
The Forty Foot Navigation at Welches Dam on the Old Bedford River. The lock was closed in 2006.

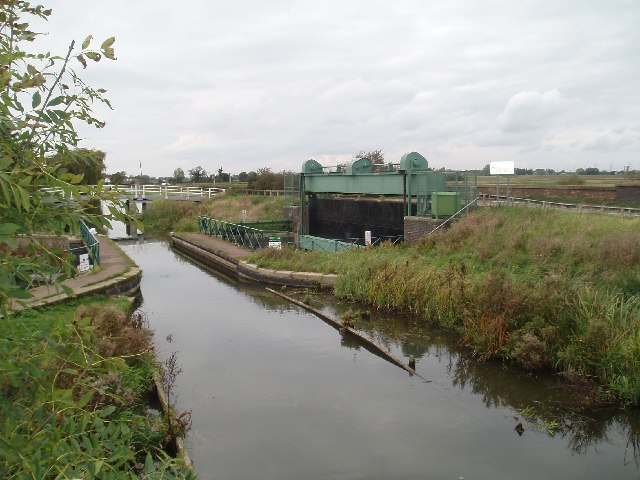
The route along Well Creek crosses the Mullicourt Aqueduct above the Middle Level Main Drain.

== See also ==
- Canals of the United Kingdom
- History of the British canal system
