= All Saints' Church, Horsington =

Church in Lincolnshire, England

- All Saints' Church, Horsington
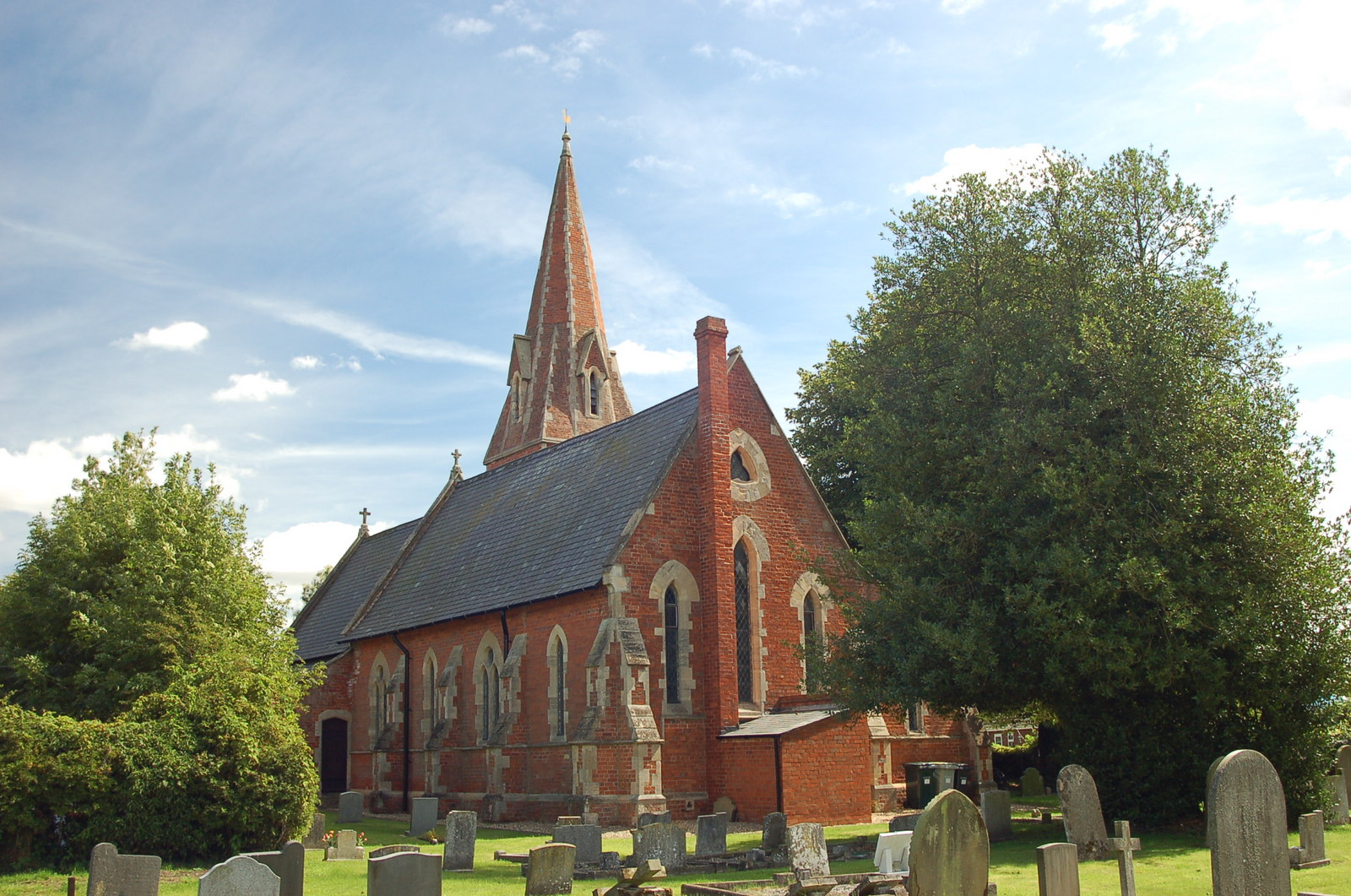
- All Saints' Church, Horsington
- All Saints' Church, Horsington
- 53.202259°N 0.215918°W
- OS grid reference: TF 19256 68731
- Location: Horsington, Lincolnshire
- Country: England
- Denomination: Church of England
- Website: woodhallspa.group/horsington

History
- Status: Active
- Dedication: All Saints
- Dedicated: 19th century
- Consecrated: 1860
- Events: 1858 church rebuilt to replace the original

Architecture
- Architectural type: Red brick (Originally thatched)

Administration
- Province: Canterbury
- Diocese: Lincoln
- Archdeaconry: Lincoln
- Deanery: Horncastle
- Parish: Horsington

All Saints' Church is the parish church of the village of Horsington in Lincolnshire, England. The original church was thatched and the living church was owned by Magdalen College, Oxford. In 1858-60 a new church was designed by David Brandon. It was given Grade II listed building status in 1966.

== History ==
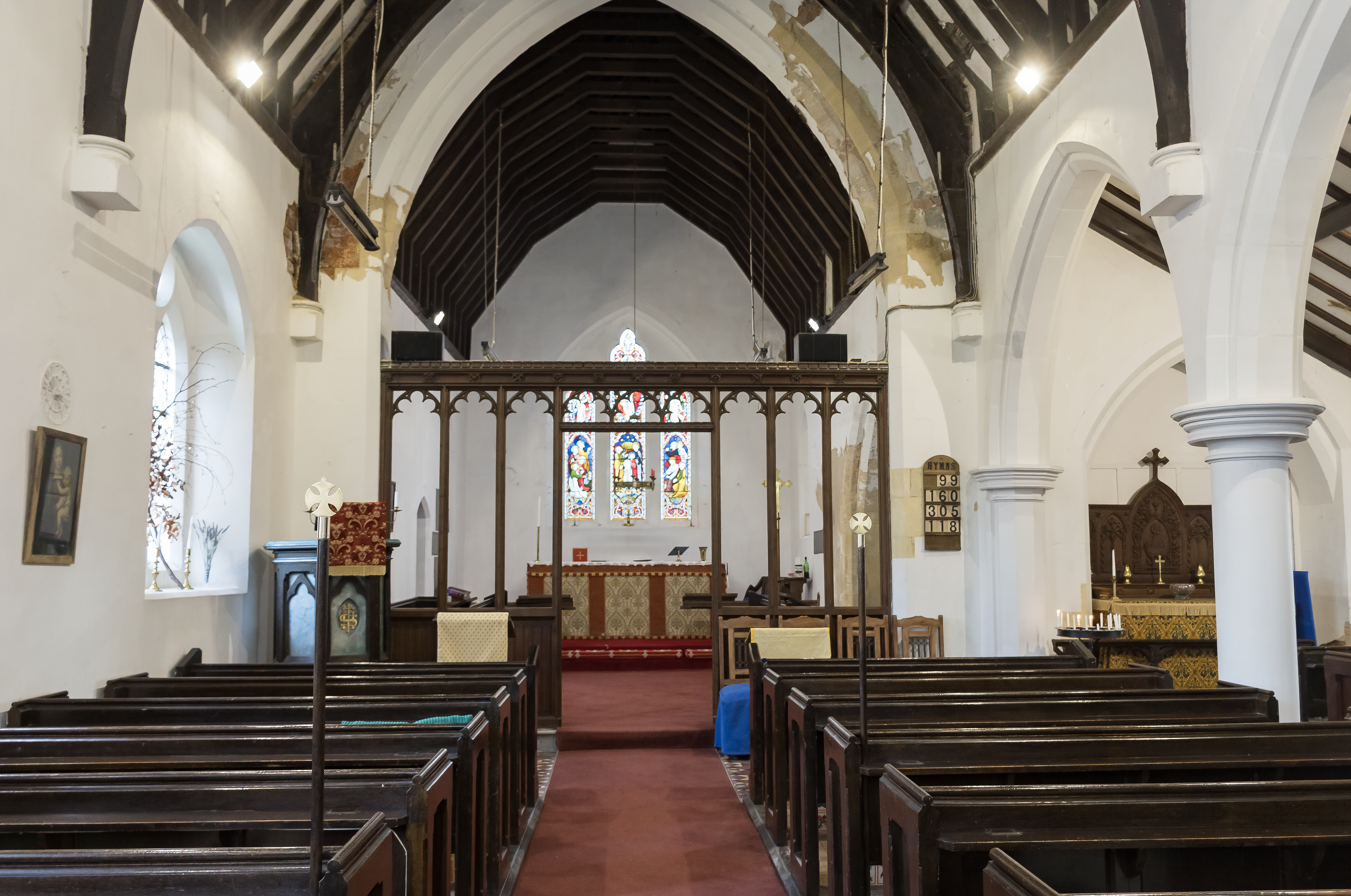
Church interior

The original church was thatched and the benefice was owned by Magdalen College, Oxford. In 1858 the college commissioned David Brandon to design a new church. Brandon built in red brick and the style chosen was Gothic Revival. The church remains the parish church of the village and surrounding hamlets. In 1966 Historic England gave it Grade II listed status. The village war memorial, commemorating its dead in the First World War, consists of a bell and clock in the tower and was installed in 1919.
