= Bedford & Milton Keynes Waterway Trust =

- Founded: 1995
- Type: Charitable trust
- Location: 30 St John Street, Newport Pagnell, Buckinghamshire, England
- Region served: Bedford, Central Bedfordshire, Milton Keynes
- Website: www.b-mkwaterway.org.uk

The Bedford & Milton Keynes Waterway Trust is an organisation formed in 1995 to promote a new waterway park, the Bedford and Milton Keynes Waterway Park.

It is a registered charity in England, and had a gross income of £56,171 in 2025.

The Trust was established in 1995 to promote the development of a broad canal, which will link the Grand Union Canal in Milton Keynes to the River Great Ouse in Bedford through a series of waterway parks. The planned route of the new canal runs from the Grand Union Canal at Campbell Park in Milton Keynes (close to Gulliver's Land), crosses the M1 motorway between Junctions 13 and 14, runs near to Brogborough Hill, through Marston Vale and connects with the River Great Ouse at Kempston.

In 2003 British Waterways announced its long-term aim to build the connection from the Grand Union at Milton Keynes to the River Great Ouse at Bedford in conjunction with a number of partner organisations.

The Trust has carried out design work on the project, funded through a £250,000 Lottery grant. The canal project suffered an apparent setback in 2004 when Milton Keynes Council did not include the route in the Supplementary Planning Guidance for the Eastern Expansion Area of Milton Keynes. However, this decision was recalled as a result of a public petition, and reversed at the subsequent meeting. The route within Milton Keynes is now protected by the SPG, and this episode serves to show public as well as political support for the scheme.

The first new structure specifically constructed for the waterway was completed in September 2009 – a 100-metre (110 yd) concrete culvert (Berry Farm A421 Underpass) incorporated into the A421 road as the result of £250,000 provided through Government Growth Area Funds. The road opened on 1 December 2010, although the underpass was not due to open for public access until sometime into 2011. In March 2025, AECOM was appointed to examine the viability of constructing part of the waterway park for the first 2km section crossing the A421 road. The company was also said to consider plans for future infrastructure and housing alongside the route.

The Trust's 2026-2031 Business Plan Summary outlines an estimate of £475 million for the cost of the whole waterway, with forecast benefits to the project of 2.4 times this sum. A minimum of 10 years was estimated by the report to be necessary in order to design and build the waterway.

One of the more speculative plans by the Trust is the "Brogborough Whirl" a proposed boat lift to take the waterway 30 metres (98 ft) up and down the eastern side of Brogborough Hill.

== See also ==
- List of waterway societies in the United Kingdom
- Waterscape
