= Guthram Gowt =

Small settlement in the South Holland district of Lincolnshire, England

Coordinates: 52.787°N 0.263°W

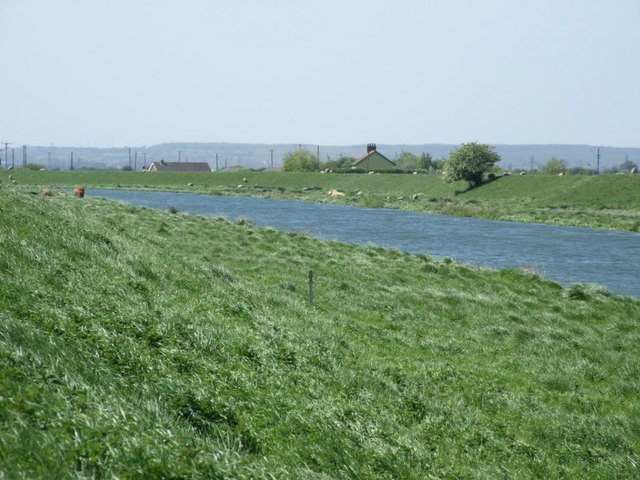
- River Glen at Guthram Gowt

- Location within Lincolnshire
- OS grid reference: TF175225
  - London: 85 mi (137 km) S
- Civil parish: Pinchbeck
- District: South Holland
- Shire county: Lincolnshire
- Region: East Midlands
- Country: England
- Sovereign state: United Kingdom
- Postcode district: PE11
- Police: Lincolnshire
- Fire: Lincolnshire
- Ambulance: East Midlands

Guthram Gowt is a small settlement in the South Holland district of Lincolnshire, England. It is situated 5 miles (8 km) both east from Bourne and west from Spalding, and at a bend in the River Glen.

== History ==
The word 'gowt' refers to a sluice or outflow, though the origin of the word is not known with complete certainty. It appears to be cognate with the French égout, sewer. Though the modern mind associates the word 'sewer' with foul water, it was not always necessarily so. There are several 'gowt' placenames on the fens, including Anton's Gowt. In a reference that predates the pumping works, the nearby turnpike toll gate was known as Guthram Cote. This is indicative, as though the spelling and form of the name vary considerably, there appears to be no reference to the use of 'gowt' in connection with Guthram's Cote before the steam engine was installed. The earlier name was still in use contemporary with the use of the engine.

In 1189, when Richard I disafforested Spalding and Pinchbeck, Guthrams Gowt was known as Gudramsende, and the precursor of the adjacent Forty Foot Drain was the Midfendic. It was also formerly called Goderhamscote.

=== Pumping station ===
A wind-driven scoopwheel pump was operating here as early as 1766. In the 19th and early 20th century a steam-powered drainage engine was in existence, set up following acts of Parliament of 1841 and 1843.

The Bourne Drainage Act 1841 (4 & 5 Vict. c. cxiii) authorized the building of an engine to drain Bourne North Fen, replacing engines (probably windmills), erected after the Bourn Inclosure Act 1766 (6 Geo. 3. c. 52 Pr.), which were described as "dilapidated, decayed and entirely removed". The Lincolnshire Fens Drainage Act 1843 (6 & 7 Vict. c. xxxvii) transferred all responsibility for this engine and the drainage from the Black Sluice commissioners to the Bourne North Fen Commissioners, a separation of responsibilities that continued until after the Second World War.

The machinery for lifting the water off the fen is situated on the side of the Forty-Foot drain at Gutheram Cote, and was erected by the Butterly Iron Company. It consists of a condensing beam engine of 30 N.H.P, the boiler pressure being originally 6lbs., but now increased to 9lbs. The cylinder is 45 inches in diameter and the stroke 6 ft. The engine works an iron scoopwheel, 15ft. in diameter, and 4ft. 3in. wide, having 30 scoops, their length being 3ft. 10in. The dip is regulated by a vertical shuttle placed near the wheel, and the dip allowed being about 2ft. The maximum lift is 4ft., the head and dip being 6ft. The engines are stopped when this lift is attained, as the water is then level with the gauge fixed under the clause in the Act. The wheel makes 4.5 revolutions a minute and the engine 19. With a full head, 2.5 tons of coal are consumed in 24 hours. This gives a coal consumption of 200.37 lbs. per horse power, per hour, of water actually lifted, which is very extravagant, modern engines and centrifugal pumps running with a consumption of 4.5lbs. per hour; whilst the maximum allowed by the Dutch authorities is 6.60lbs.

The area of land drained is about 4,000 acres, but only 3,500 acres are liable to taxation.

The level of the Fen varies from 4ft. to 6ft. above the Ordnance datum, or from 12ft. to 13ft. above the sill of the Black Sluice which is 20 miles distant.

— Wheeler, W. H., A history of the Fens of South Lincolnshire

The book goes on to describe how proposals for a replacement engine were made in 1881, but were not taken up before Wheeler went to press.

However, in 1895 the scoopwheel was replaced: with a 20-inch (510 mm) centrifugal pump made by Easton & Anderson. Then in 1918 the steam engine was replaced by a 50 hp (37 kW) horizontal gas engine, which drove the Easton and Anderson pump via belt. In 1933 a two-cylinder Ruston diesel and a Gwynnes pump were added.

There are now no pumping facilities on site, only a rainfall telemetry station for the Environment Agency.

== Geography ==
Guthram Gowt falls within the drainage area of the Black Sluice Internal Drainage Board. It is at the southern, upstream end of the South Forty-Foot Drain, and the location chosen for a new lock to allow traffic into the River Glen as part of the Fens Waterways Link project.

A few buildings in agricultural use are located at the site, and on the opposite side of the road is Glen farm, and on the opposite side of the River Glen, Willow Tree Farm. Guthram Gowt is served by Delaine Buses 302 service to Spalding, and the Lincolnshire CallConnect minibus service.
