= The Haven, Boston =

River in Lincolnshire, England

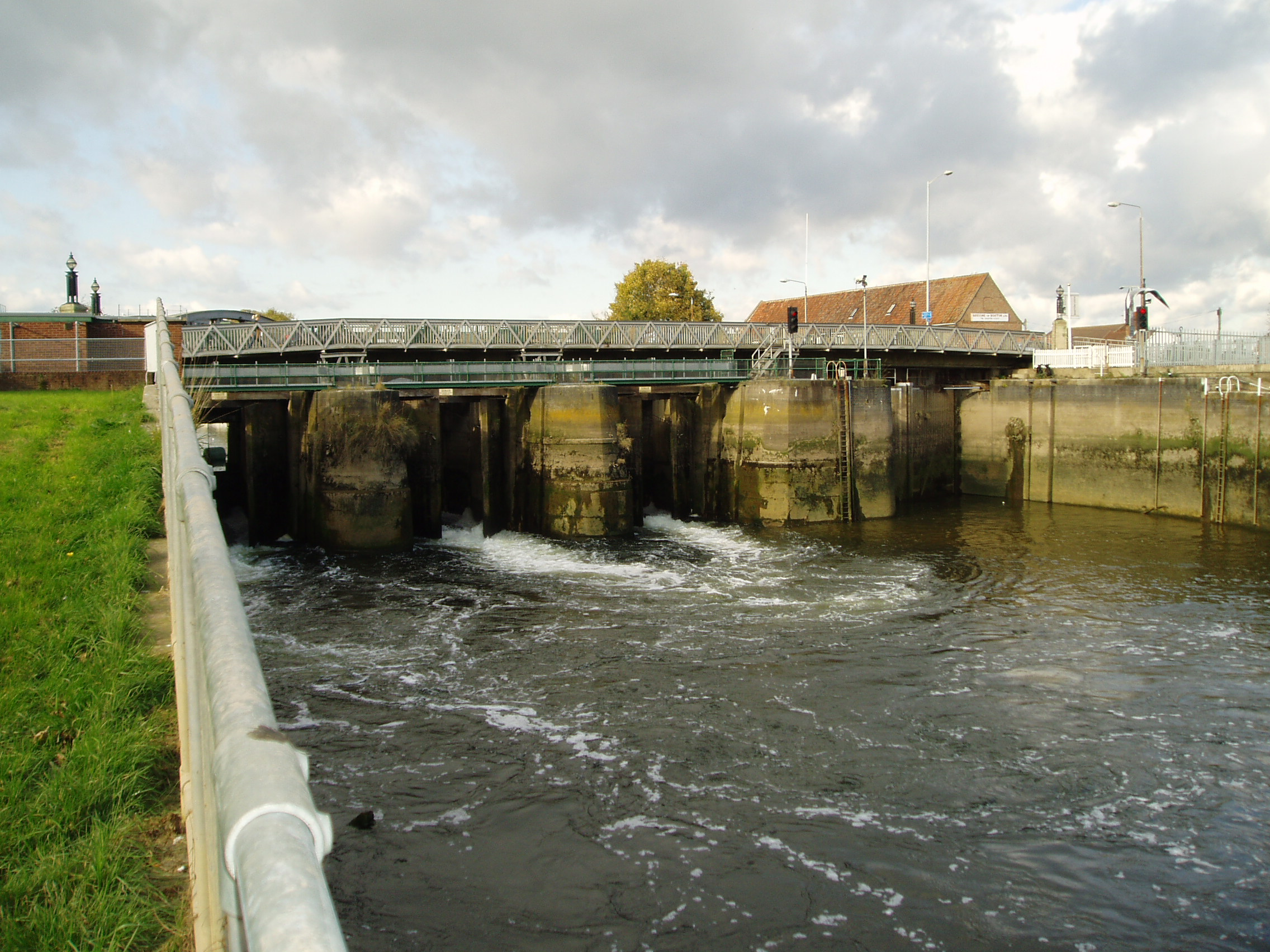
- The Grand Sluice where the River Witham empties into The Haven. The lock is on the far right.

Location
- Country: England
- County: Lincolnshire

Physical characteristics
- Source
  - location: Grand Sluice, Boston
  - coordinates: 52.9811°N 0.0292°W
- Mouth
  - location: The Wash at Black Buoy Sand
  - coordinates: 52.9336°N 0.0808°E
- Length: 4.3 mi (6.9 km)

Basin features
- Tributaries
  - left: Maud Foster Drain, Hobhole Drain
  - right: South Forty-Foot Drain

The Haven is the tidal river of the port of Boston, Lincolnshire in England. It provides access for shipping between Boston Deeps in The Wash and the town, particularly, the dock. It also serves as the outfall into the sea of the River Witham and of several major land drains of the northern Fens of eastern England, which are known collectively as the Witham Navigable Drains.

== History ==
Boston did not exist as a settlement prior to 1086, not being mentioned in Domesday Book. At the time, it was probably an un-named hamlet to the west of the larger settlement of Skirbeck, for which there were two churches recorded and two priests. One would have been St Nicholas's in Skirbeck itself, and the other was probably St Botolph's, by which name the early settlement at Boston became known. The settlement grew rapidly during the 11th, 12th and 13th centuries, as it lay between the city of Lincoln and the North Sea. Wool and corn were shipped down the River Witham, and Boston's location on an island of higher ground where the river joined a wide creek or haven made it an ideal site for a port.

Although the area to the north and west of Boston was a huge expanse of bog and marsh, the Haven was sufficiently shallow for it to have a ford. Two ancient trackways met there, one heading northwards to the Wolds, close to the route of the modern A16 road, while the other followed the coast, parts of which have been reused by the A52 road. The Wolds trackway ran along a slightly raised causeway called the "stick", and had been used in prehistoric and Roman times.

In the 12th century Boston and its Haven became busy with trade as wool was brought into the town for export, particularly to Flanders. A century later, the volume of wool exported exceeded that shipped from London. Other commodities included wheat, sea-salt, woollen cloth manufactured in Lincoln and Stamford, lead from Derbyshire and iron from Yorkshire. Imports included wine and finished cloth produced in the Low Countries from the wool that had been exported.

By around 1800, the lower reaches of The Haven had become of network of winding channels, increasingly plagued by deposits of sand and silt, which made the use of Boston as a port problematic. It also resulted in increased flooding within the town. Boston Corporation therefore asked John Rennie to suggest a solution for the 13.5 miles (21.7 km) of waterway from the Black Sluice to the sea. He proposed two solutions, the first of which involved straightening the channel between Skirbeck Church and the outfall of Hobhole Drain, from where a new cut would be created to reach the sea. The second was for a new cut from Skirbeck Church running to the north of the existing channel. The corporation chose the first option, which would shorten the distance to the sea by 4.5 miles (7.2 km). Work began in 1830 on an 800-yard (730 m) section above the Hobhole outfall. This reduced the length of the channel by 1.5 miles (2.4 km) and took three years to complete. Some of the channel was straightened by placing bundles of sticks known as fascines at outside bends. These resulted in silt being deposited on those bends, and the channel becoming straighter. Fascine work was carried out in 1841 and 1860. Silting of the river outfall became worse, and three Ruston steam navvies were used to create a new cut from Hobhole outfall to the Wash between 1880 and 1884.

Town Bridge prevented ships with masts from passing further upsteam, but river boats heading for Lincoln used the churchyard of St Botolphs as a quay. Once construction of the Grand Sluice was completed in 1766, they used a wharf above the sluice. On The Haven, boats used Packhouse Quay, subsequently known as Custom House Quay. To improve moorings, brick and stone walls were built on both banks of the river in 1815, from Assembly Rooms to Packhouse Quay on the east bank and at Doughty Quay on the west bank. Public warehouses were also built to serve both quays. However, by the 1880s ships resting on the mud at low tide was not particularly safe, and in parallel with the new channel to the Wash, a wet dock was built. All of the Victorian warehousing that was built has since been replaced by modern industrial units, as the port handles around one million tonnes of cargo each year.

The first ship to sail up the realigned channel and into the dock was the Myrtle, a 1,700-ton ship carrying cotton seed, which berthed in the dock on 20 December 1884. Development of the port had taken around 90 years, but resulted in a channel which scoured itself, needing little dredging. Land drainage in the area was also improved, as water levels on the downstream side of the Grand Sluice were reduced by around 4 feet (1.2 m).

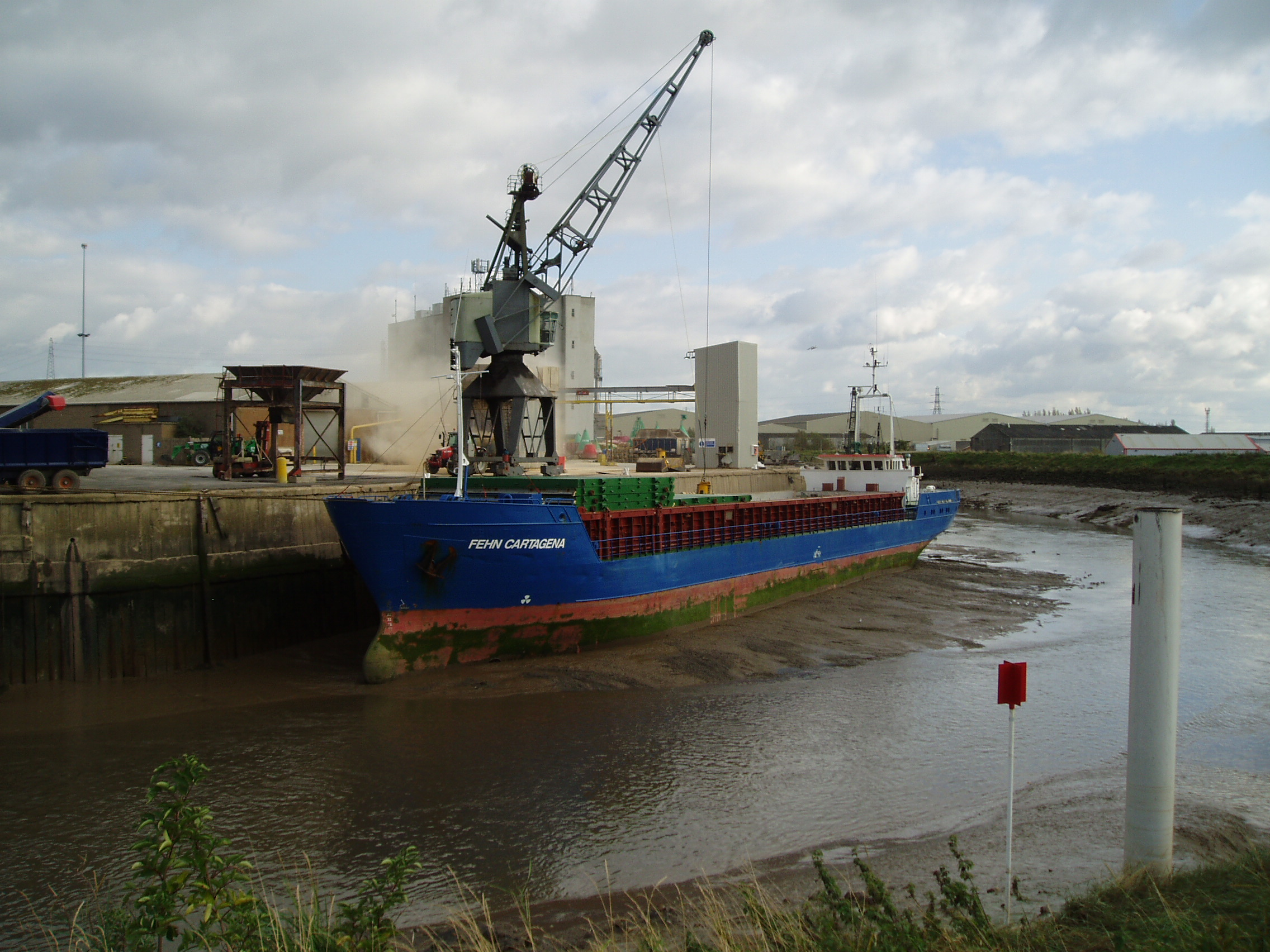
The "Fehn Cartagena" unloading a cargo of stone while moored on a mudbank in The Haven, opposite the Black Sluice

Improvements to The Haven convinced a group of businessmen to set up the Boston Deep Sea Fishing and Ice Company in 1885. Initially they worked two new-build steam trawlers and seven sailing smacks, but gradually phased out the smacks, as the trawlers were more profitable. By 1890, they had 24 trawlers, and later amalgamated with the Boston Steam Fishing Company, another company which operated from The Haven. Fred Parkes, who had four boats of his own, joined the company in 1919. He wanted to replace older trawlers with new ones, but facing opposition, he waited until 1924, by which time he owned a controlling interest in the company. The new trawlers returned the company to profitability. In 1922, The Haven was blocked for three months when a coaster capsized. The company finally managed to salvage the sunken vessel, but Boston Corporation were unwilling to pay the recovery costs despite having agreed to do so. This together with a decline in the fishing industry led to the company moving its fleet to Fleetwood in Lancashire in 1923 and Boston declining as a fishing port.

In 2020, Boston still has a fishing fleet of around 26 boats, but rather than deep sea trawlers, they work locally landing their catches of cockles, mussels and shrimps. As a result of the Boston Harbour Revision Order 1989, Boston Council ceased to be the harbour authority, and this role was taken over by the Port of Boston Limited. The port is operated by Victoria Group, with facilities for docking eight ships within the wet dock and six at riverside berths. Types of cargo handled include steel, paper and forest products together with containers, bulk, palletised and general goods.

== Course ==
The Haven starts at the Grand Sluice, which marks the end of the non-tidal River Witham. This consists of four channels, three of them containing sluice doors on the upstream and downstream faces, which regulate flow through the sluice, and a fourth wider one by the east bank containing a lock structure with two sets of gates. The A1137 road passes over the top of the sluice, supported by four segmental arches constructed of red brick, which now carry a modern concrete bridge deck on top of them. The sluice was built between 1764 and 1766 by John Grundy and Langley Edwards, while the alterations to include the lock were made in 1883. The bridge carries an inscription: "Lock opened by Edmund Turner Esq. on 8th December 1883. John Evelyn Williams engineer, William Rigby, contractor." The concrete deck to the road bridge dates from the 20th century.

The next bridge downstream is St Botolph's Footbridge, close to St Botolph's Church. A 213-foot (65 m) bowstring arch bridge was craned into position on 22 February 2014, to replace a steel structure dating from the 1970s. Access ramps were installed on the following day, and the surrounding area was enhanced subsequently. Part of the rationale for the new bridge, which was designed and installed by the civil engineers Britcon, was that it would be accessible to those with mobility scooters, wheelchairs and pushchairs.

Town Bridge was the first cast-iron bridge to be built by John Rennie. It was originally designed to have a span of 72 feet (22 m), but this was increased to 86 feet (26 m) without increasing the rise of 5.5 feet (1.7 m). Some doubts were expressed about its stability, and some of the ironwork developed fractures which needed strapping, but the structure lasted until 1912. Rennie's stone bases were retained, but a new cast-iron bridge deck was installed by John Webster in 1913. Prior to 1806, the main crossing of the river was slightly further upstream.

Haven Bridge carries the A16 road across The Haven. A public enquiry was held in December 1956, at which the council proposed one route for the future inner relief road, and objectors proposed an alternative route. The bridge was eventually opened in 1966, but the inner relief road, by then renamed John Adams Way, was not completed until 12 years later.

The final bridge on The Haven is a single track railway swing bridge, constructed in 1882 by Handysides of Derby. It enabled the docks to be connected to the Great Northern Railway. The structure was partly assembled at Derby, and all the parts were delivered to the site in November 1882, where they were put together. The hydraulic control system is operated from an octagonal control cabin on the west bank of The Haven.

Below the swing bridge is the entrance lock to the South Forty-Foot Drain, also known as the Black Sluice Navigation. This was commissioned in 2009, as part of the Fens Waterways Link, and allows boats to access 19 miles (31 km) of waterway. There are plans to provide a through link to the River Glen and onwards to Peterborough. The Haven than passes through the tidal barrier and the entrance to the wet dock. The volume of water is swelled by the outfall from Maud Foster Drain and Hobhole Drain, both part of the Witham Navigable Drains although there is no access by boat to either of these drains from The Haven. Hobhole pumping station, dating from 1957, has three diesel pumps. On the right bank, Wyberton Marsh pumping station operated by the Black Sluice Internal Drainage Board pumps water from Wyberton Marsh into the Haven. Finally, it joins the Welland outfall at Boston Deeps, near Black Buoy Sand.

== Boston Barrier ==
Historically, Boston has been affected by tidal flooding, caused by tidal surges passing up The Haven from the Wash. Flooding from this cause was particularly severe in 1953 and 1978. Following the creation of a new tidal lock in 2008 to allow boats to enter the South Forty-Foot Drain from the Haven, phase 1b of the project to create a navigable waterway between Boston and Spalding involved the construction of the Boston Barrier. As well as being part of wider flood defence works, this would allow boats to pass through Boston town centre to access the South Forty Foot Drain at most states of the tide. At the time, it was expected that the project would be completed by 2013, but work did not start, and serious flooding occurred again in 2013, when over 800 homes and 79 businesses were inundated.

The floods raised public awareness of the need to protect Boston from tidal flooding, and as many of the details of implementing a water level management scheme through the town were still to be resolved, the partnership responsible for the barrier opted to create a flood defence structure which would not preclude management of water levels at a later date. The floods had also damaged three of the five pumps at the Black Sluice pumping station, and although the Environment Agency considered transferring the station to the Black Sluice Internal Drainage Board, the costs were huge for very little benefit, and they decided instead to decommission the station. If water level management within The Haven remained unchanged, they could discharge more water from the South Forty-Foot Drain through the gravity sluice and the adjacent navigation lock than they could with all five pumps running.

Following a public enquiry in 2017, a £100 million project to build the barrier and associated flood defence works on both sides of the river, including widening the access to the Port of Boston wet dock, was awarded by the Environment Agency to the civil engineers BMMJV, a joint venture consisting of BAM Nuttall and Mott MacDonald. The costs of the scheme were met by the government's Flood Defence Grant in Aid fund, after it was deemed to be a national priority project in 2014.

The main components of the scheme were a rising sector gate, 85 feet (26 m) wide by 36 feet (11 m) high, which can be raised to prevent tidal surges moving further upstream, and a vertical sector gate, 59 feet (18 m) wide by 38 feet (11.6 m) high, to control the entrance to the wet dock. The rising sector gate weighs 362 tonnes and is moved by two 55-tonne hydraulic rams. The scheme also included a control building for the barrier, higher flood defence walls along the river, including landscaping of the right bank, and the placing of matting on the bed of the river either side of the barrier, to prevent scouring undermining the structure. The construction of the barrier was innovative, as it is quite different to the Thames Barrier in its design, and the only other similar structure, that at Ipswich on the River Orwell, is some 30 per cent smaller, and had not been commissioned at the time the Boston Barrier project began. Work began on the project in 2018, and the sector gate, which was manufactured in Holland, was delivered in November 2019. The gate was operational by December 2020, and the completed scheme offers better flood protection to nearly 14,000 homes and businesses. The entrance to the wet dock was widened from 52 feet (16 m) to 59 feet (18 m), with the existing timber V-gates being replaced by a single pair of vertical sector gates.

Because the work affected navigation, it was authorised by a Transport and Works Act 1992 Order. The Transport and Works Act (1992) was introduced to simplify the process of obtaining permission for the construction or alteration of railways and inland navigations, and any work which interferes with rights of navigation. The completed barrier was recognised in the civil engineering world, receiving six awards, four from the Institution of Civil Engineers, one from the Royal Institution of Chartered Surveyors, and an Environment Agency Flood and Coast Award. The National Audit Office noted in 2023 that delivery of parts of the project were four years overdue, and that costs had escalated from £124 million to £184 million. This was partly due to work starting before the project had been fully scoped, in order to meet government deadlines for flood defence targets.

== Historical connection ==
In 1607, The Haven, between Boston and the sea (TF 361 402), was the scene of the first, abortive, attempt of the Scrooby Pilgrims, to leave England. Ultimately, in 1620, they became part of the original settlement of Plymouth, Massachusetts.

== See also ==
- Canals of the United Kingdom
- History of the British canal system
