= Horsington, Lincolnshire =

Village and civil parish in the East Lindsey district of Lincolnshire, England

Coordinates: 53.202484°N 0.2151°W

Horsington
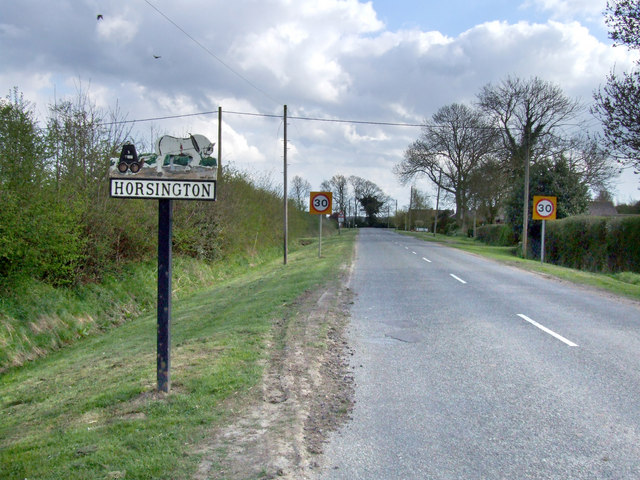
- Horsington road sign

- Location within Lincolnshire
- Population: 242 (2011)
- OS grid reference: TF193687
  - London: 115 mi (185 km) S
- District: East Lindsey
- Shire county: Lincolnshire
- Region: East Midlands
- Country: England
- Sovereign state: United Kingdom
- Post town: WOODHALL SPA
- Postcode district: LN10
- Dialling code: 01526
- Police: Lincolnshire
- Fire: Lincolnshire
- Ambulance: East Midlands
- UK Parliament: Louth and Horncastle

Horsington is a village and civil parish in the East Lindsey district of Lincolnshire, England. It lies on the B1190, 4 miles (6.4 km) north from Woodhall Spa and 6 miles (10 km) west from Horncastle as well as 6 miles east of Bardney. The parish includes the hamlet of Poolham which is situated 1 mi (1.6 km) to the east of the village.

== History ==
In 1860 the Grade II listed parish church of All Saints' Church was completely rebuilt in red brick, the previous structure being thatched. At that time the Horsington Anglican rectory and living was in the gift of Magdalen College, Oxford, as principal landowner and provider of the village Lords of the Manor. Magdalen possibly provided the church organ. The same year the college founded the village National School, and subscribed to its support. Kelly also notes the existence of a Wesleyan chapel.

In 1872 White's Directory reported that Horsington had a population of 397 within a parish of 1,700 acres (7 km^{2}) that extends to Hare Booth 5 miles (8 km) south on the River Witham and includes farms and a wood. Stixwould railway station was 4 miles (6.4 km) to the east.

A significant area of parish land was part of the manorial rights held by Magdalen College, Oxford, who held the patronage for the benefice of the ecclesiastical parish. The incumbency was a rectory that included a residence which was built in 1857. A 1760 enclosure of parish land provided 290 acres (1.2 km^{2}) of glebe land—an area of land used to support a parish priest—in lieu of tithes [tax income from parishioners derived from their profit on sales, or extraction of produce and animals, typically to the tenth part], with a further 14 acres in South Somercotes. Over 5 acres of land had been allotted to the ecclesiastical parish to service church upkeep "from time immemorial". About 1 mile (1.6 km) from the church was recorded a burial ground of about one acre, which was purchased by parishioners 100 years previously. The Wesleyans and Independent churches had each a chapel at Horsington.

A National School attended by 60 children was built in 1861. Professions and trades listed in 1872 included the rector, a parish clerk, a schoolmaster, a farm bailiff, a blacksmith, a dressmaker, a shoemaker, two shopkeepers, a coal dealer, a bricklayer, a carpenter, a wheelwright, a miller, a beer retailer, the licensed victualler of the Baronet Inn, and thirteen farmers, one of whom was also a miller.

Apart from the All Saints' Church, other Grade II listed buildings are three cottages on the village's Main Street, and a ruined 13th-century chapel at Poolham Hall.
