= River Glen, Lincolnshire =

River in Lincolnshire and Rutland, England

River Glen
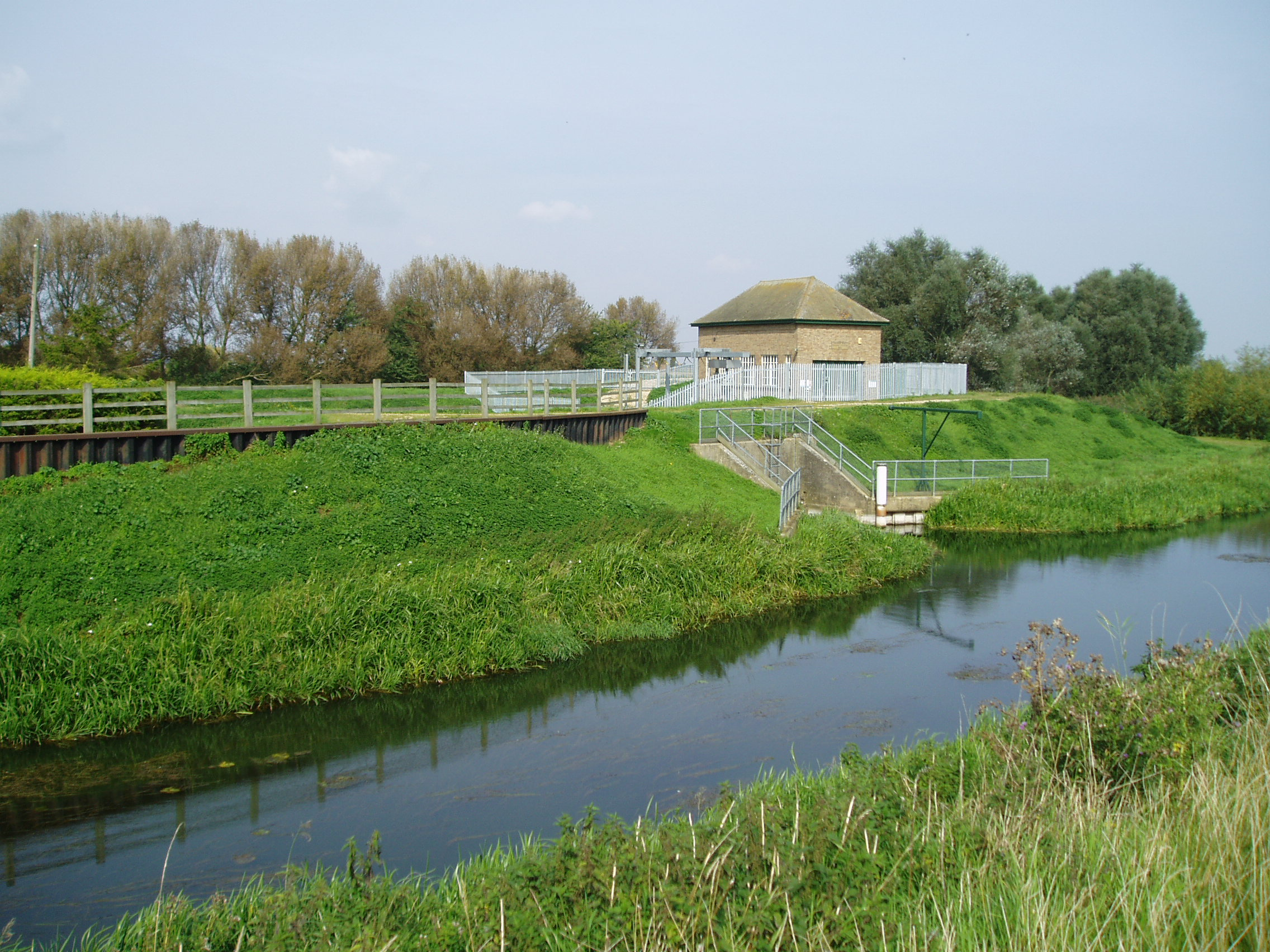
- The pumping station at Tongue End, which marks the head of navigation, and the point at which the Bourne Eau joins the River Glen.

Location
- Country: England

Physical characteristics
- Source
  - location: Ropsley and Boothby Pagnall
- Mouth
  - location: River Welland, below Spalding

The River Glen is a river in Lincolnshire, England with a short stretch passing through Rutland near Essendine.

The river's name appears to derive from a Brythonic Celtic language but there is a strong early English connection.

== Naming ==
In the language of the Ancient Britons, which survives today as Welsh, Cornish and Breton, the neighbouring rivers, the Glen and the Welland seem to have been given contrasting names. The Welland flowed from the area underlain by the Northampton Sands which in many places are bound together by iron oxide to form ironstone. In the Roman period, the sands were easily worked as arable land and the ironstone was dug for smelting. In both cases, the ground was exposed to erosion which meant that silt was carried down to The Fens by the river. In modern Welsh, gwaelod (from Late Proto-British *Woelǫd-) means bottom and its plural, gwaelodion means sediment. Among the medieval forms of the name 'Welland' is Weolod; the river could have thus been named from its silty nature. In contrast, the Glen flowed from clays and limestone. Areas with clay-based soils tended to remain as woodland whilst the limestone areas provided grassland for pasture. Consequently, the River Glen did not carry much sediment. The modern Welsh for clean is glân. The relative amounts of silt deposited in the fens around Maxey and around Thurlby respectively, by the two rivers, support this view.

== Course ==
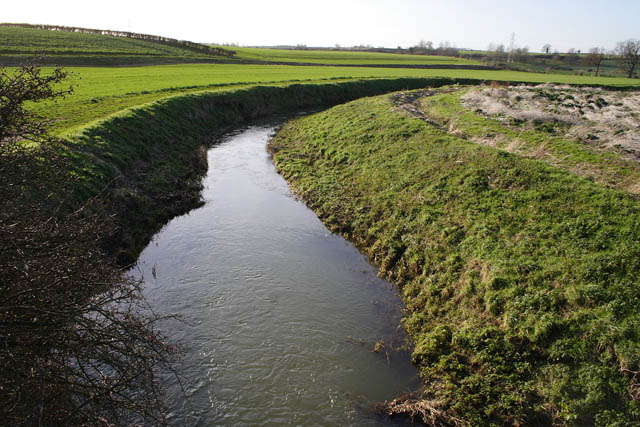
The East Glen river between Edenham and Lound

The river has two sources, both in the low ridge of Jurassic rocks in the west of the county. The East Glen rises as a number of small streams near to Ropsley and Humby, close to the 300-foot (91 m) contour. It flows in a southerly direction, passing to the east of Ingoldsby and to the west of Bulby, to arrive at Edenham. The East Glen is sometimes called the River Eden, derived as a back-formation from its passing through the parish of Edenham. It continues south through Toft, where a Grade II listed bridge built in the early 1800s crosses, and Manthorpe, where there is another listed bridge with a single elliptical arch built in 1813, before turning east to join the West Glen at Wilsthorpe, Lincolnshire. The West Glen also has a number of sources, near to the 330-foot (100 m) contour at Old Somerby and Boothby Pagnall. It flows more or less parallel to the East Glen, passing through Bitchfield, Burton-le-Coggles, Corby Glen and Creeton to reach Essendine, where it turns east towards Greatford. In the village, a two-arched stone bridge built in the late 1700s carries Church Lane over the river.

Most of the water from the West Glen river no longer joins that from the East Glen, as it now flows along the Greatford Cut to join the River Welland upstream of Market Deeping. The re-routing was devised by E. G. Taverner, the chief engineer for the Welland and Deepings Drainage Board, towards the end of the Second World War, and was part of a much larger project which involved the digging of the Coronation Channel, a flood relief channel to divert the Welland around the south-eastern edge of Spalding, and the construction of Fulney lock, to exclude tidal water from the upper Welland. The whole scheme cost £723,000, and the Coronation Channel, which was completed in 1953, was named to commemorate the crowning of Queen Elizabeth II in the same year.

By the time the East and West rivers join, they are only just above the 35-foot (11 m) contour. Once joined, the river flows in a northerly direction, past Fletland Mill, a former grain mill which was built in 1759, and Kate's Bridge weir, where a modern bridge carries the A15 road over it. This bypasses a single-arched bridge built in the late 1700s, which has a female head carved on the keystone of the western face, presumed to be the Kate after whom the bridge is named. Beyond the bridges, the river becomes a typical Fens high level carrier, embanked on both sides and partially straightened, with counter drains on both sides of the channel, to collect seepage through the banks, as the normal water levels are higher than the surrounding land. At Tongue End the waters of the Bourne Eau join. The river below here is navigable for its last 11.5 miles (18.5 km), and there was once a navigable connection to the Bourne Eau, but the Tongue End pumping station now sits between the two rivers, to aid drainage of the land to the west. The Weir Dyke drain runs along the north bank of the Bourne Eau and then the west bank of the Glen, to join the South Forty-Foot Drain near Guthram Gowt. For some distance either side of Tongue End, the Counter Drain runs a considerable distance to the east of the channel, creating washlands between them which can be flooded if water is not able to dischange from the river into the Welland estuary, as a result of the state of the tides. A little before Guthram Gowt, the Counter Drain turns to the east to reach Pode Hole pumping station, which plays an important part in the drainage of Deeping Fen.

Beyond Guthram Gowt, the river flows in a north-easterly direction, and is flanked on both sides by drainage ditches because the land is low-lying. It passes through Pinchbeck and Surfleet to reach the tidal entrance sluice where it joins the River Welland. The sluice is only navigable when the tidal level is the same as the river level.

== History ==
Historia Brittonum, an ancient history of Britain traditionally attributed to Nennius, a ninth-century Welsh monk, records that Arthur, the war leader of the Britons fought his first battle against the Anglo-Saxons at the mouth of the River Glein [sic]. Thomas Green presents a case for the Glein being the Glen, based on the identification of Linnuis, the district for four subsequent battles, being Lindsey, although he acknowledges that other locations, including the River Glen, Northumberland for example, have been suggested. This aerial photo shows the River Glen at Guthram, halfway between Twenty and West Pinchbeck. To the south, the Roman road across the fen lies hidden, buried in Baston Fen and Pinchbeck Common. In Arthur's time, around the year 500, the north-flowing section of the Glen entered tidal flats lying in Pinchbeck North Fen, to the north-east of Guthram. The line of the river to the east of Guthram appears to have originated as a sea bank but when sedimentation and fen enclosure caused the sea no longer to reach it, the river was led away along the bank so that the sea bank became one of river's banks instead. The section of the A151 road on the 'seaward' side of the Glen was not built until 1822.

Close to the year 500, the spread of Anglian settlement had recently reached Baston, at the other end of this Roman road, on the landward side of this fen but burial at the Urns Farm cemetery alongside King Street then stopped abruptly.

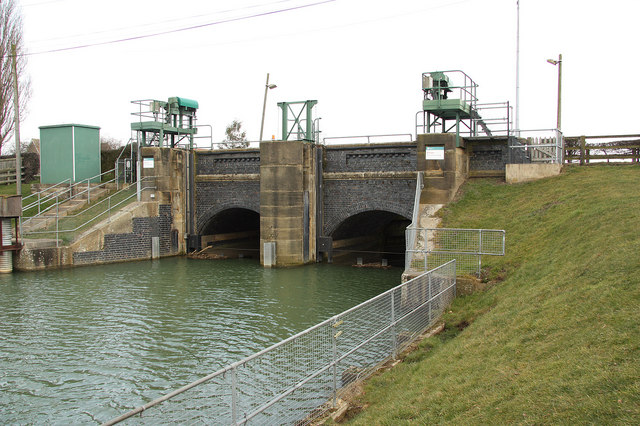
Surfleet Sluice, built in 1879, where the Glen meets the River Welland

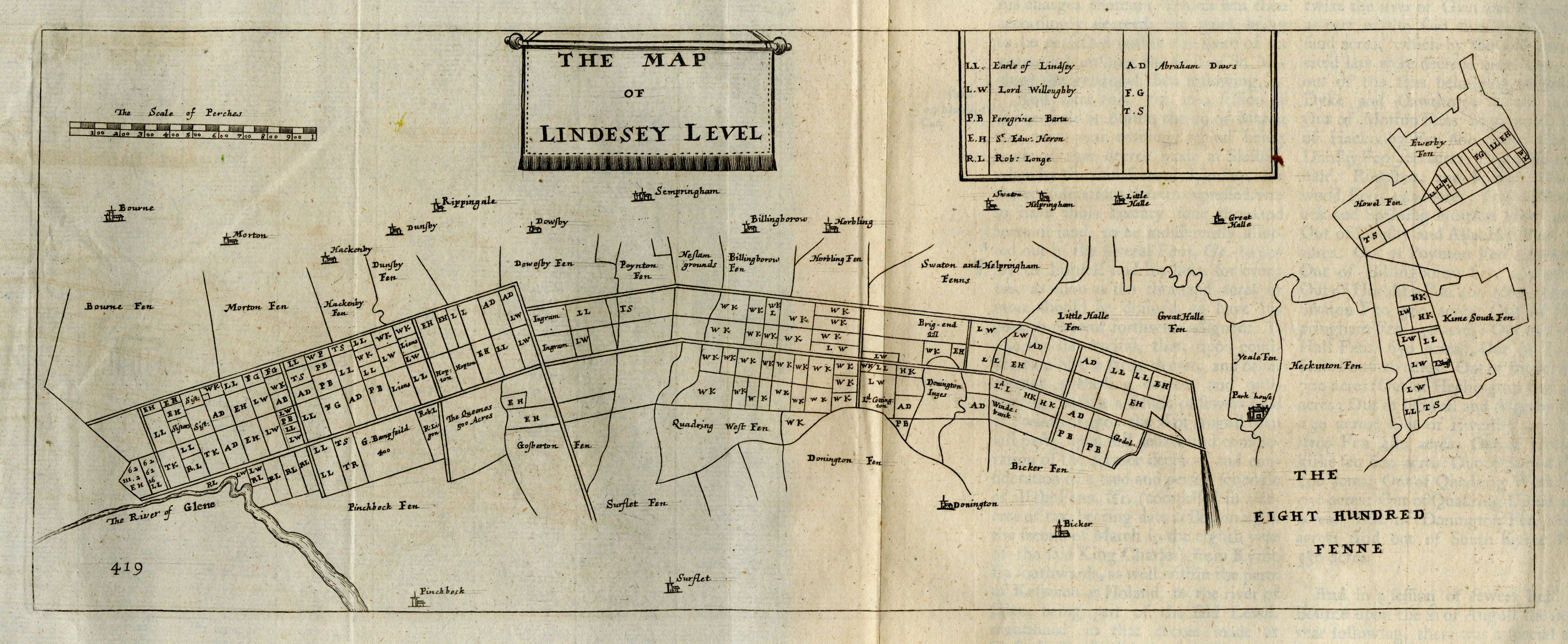
"The Map of the Lindsey Level" from "The history of imbanking and drayning" by William Dugdale (1662).

Compared to its neighbour, the Welland, there are few records of the history of the Glen. Dugdale, writing his book The History of Imbanking and Drayning of divers Fenns and Marshes in 1662, which was based on personal observations he made during a trip to the Fens in May 1657, and the records of the Fens Office, most of which were destroyed in the Great Fire of London in 1666, thought it was the least of the rivers he had seen, and recorded that it "serveth almost to none other use, but to carry away so much of its own water, with the rill descending from Burne, as can be kept between two defensible banks." The embanking of the lower river had thus already been done by the time of his account.

Both the Bourne Eau and the Glen were affected by flooding, causing failure of the banks, which was addressed in the Black Sluice Act 1765 (5 Geo. 3. c. 86 Pr.). The history of navigation is intimately tied up with that of the Bourne Eau, since Bourne was the main centre of population above Spalding. The Bourne Eau Act 1781 (21 Geo. 3. c. 22) appointed trustees, who were to scour and cleanse the river, and could charge tolls to fund the operation. Corn and wool passed down the river, bound for Boston, while coal and groceries were the principal cargo in the opposite direction. In 1792, Thomas Hawkes wrote about trade in timber, which was carried from Bourne to Spalding, and there was a boat which carried passengers to the market at Spalding on Tuesdays, but he comments that the service was erratic, as there was often too little or too much water for the vessels to operate. The Black Sluice Commissioners installed flood doors between the Glen and the Bourne Eau at Tongue End, to prevent high water levels in the Glen passing up the river to Bourne.

Breaching of the banks by floodwater was a continual problem, with six breaches of the north bank recorded between 1821 and 1882, and eight of the south bank in the same period. Measurement showed that the river level rose by 9 or 10 inches (23 or 25 cm) for every 0.25 inches (6.4 mm) of rain falling on the river's catchment area. The arrival of railways in the area resulted in a rapid decline of river traffic. A railway from Boston to Spalding opened in 1848, while the line from Spalding opened to Bourne in 1866 and on to Sleaford in 1872. Although occasional boats were still reaching Bourne in 1857, the self-acting doors at Tongue End were replaced by a sluice in the 1860s, which prevented passage from the Glen to the Bourne Eau, although the right of navigation was not officially revoked until 1962, as part of flood defence measures which included the replacement of the sluice by a pumping station in 1966.

Once the route to Bourne was closed off, there was little trade on the river, although a short section of about 1 mile (1.6 km) was used by barges until the 1920s. Although the present head of navigation is at Tongue End, there is evidence that lighters capable of carrying 15 tons used to navigate to Kate's Bridge, where the Lincoln to Peterborough turnpike road crossed the river, and there are the remains of moorings at Greatford Hall, although navigation to there must have ceased after Kate's Bridge was rebuilt.

In 1734, John Grundy, one of the pioneers in applying scientific principles to the solution of civil engineering problems, was asked by the Adventurers of Deeping Fen to consider the drainage of 47 square miles (120 km^{2}) of fenland to the west of Spalding. His plans included the construction of a reservoir which covered 10 acres (4.0 ha), impounded by a sluice at Surfleet. At low tide, the water would be released, and the scouring action would deepen the channel, with a consequent improvement in drainage. Humphrey Smith directed the construction, with Grundy acting as engineer, which was completed in 1739, according to a plaque fixed to it at the time. The sluice had three openings, each 8 feet (2.4 m) wide, with pointed doors on the downstream site, which closed as the tide rose, and lifting gates on the upstream side, which would be raised to discharge the water. The present sluice was erected by the trustees of the Deeping Fen Drainage Act 1856. The first stone was laid by Lord Kesteven on 17 February 1879 and the sluice opened in November 1879 at a total cost of £15,000.

== Development ==
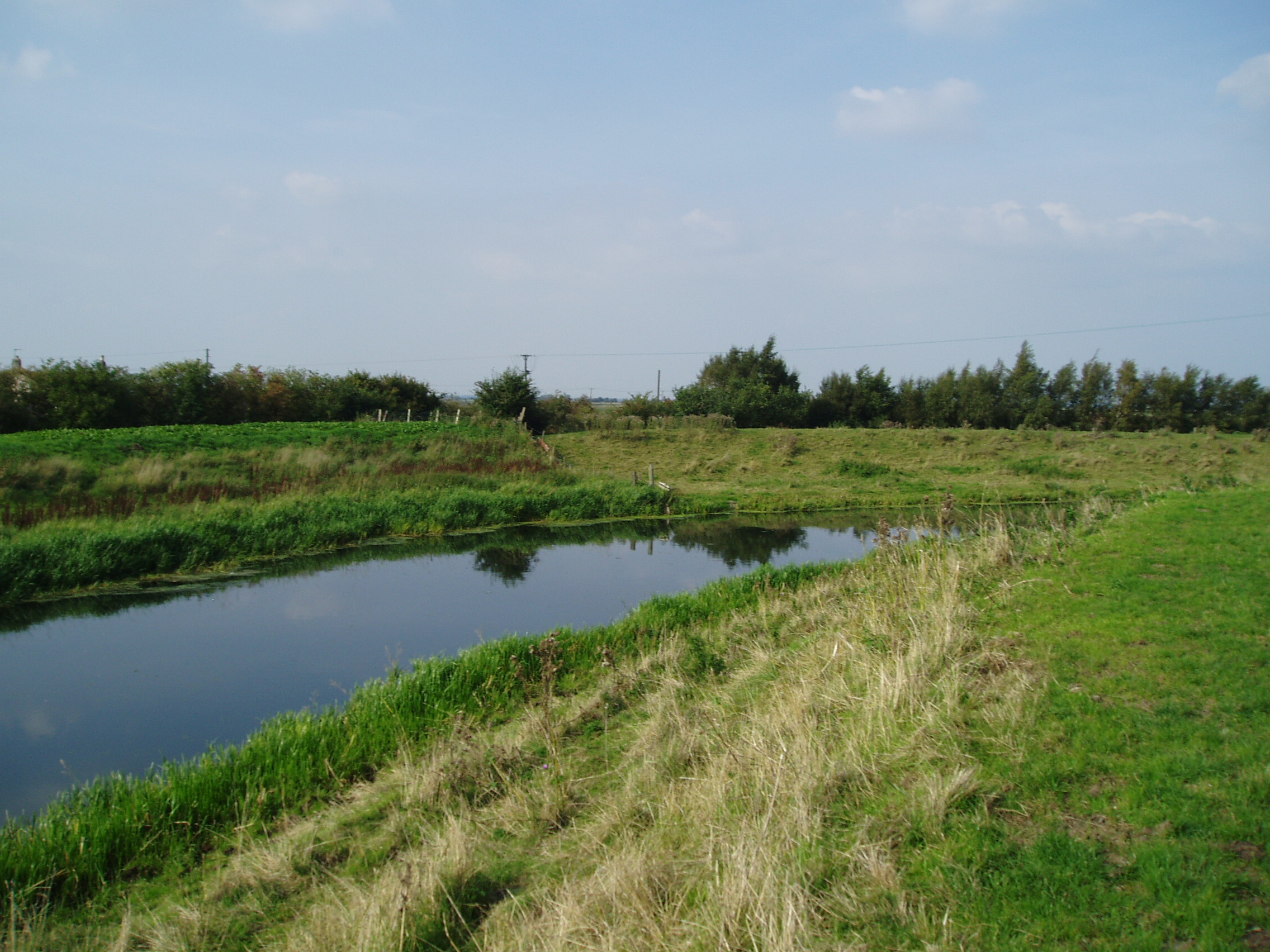
The bend in the river at Guthram Gowt, where the junction with the proposed Fens Link will probably be located.

The Environment Agency are the navigation authority responsible for the river. They issue licences for its use, and operate Surfleet sluice when required. While the river is navigable for 11.5 miles (18.5 km) to Tongue End, the upper reaches above Pinchbeck Bars are only suitable for smaller boats, as there are no locations where it is possible to turn a boat which is over 30 feet (9.1 m) long. However, the 8.9-mile (14.3 km) section of the river from its source to Guthram Gowt forms part of the proposed Fens Waterways Link, which will ultimately link the River Witham to the River Nene, via the South Forty-Foot Drain, the River Glen, the River Welland and some upgraded drains near Peterborough. Phase One, the connection of the South Forty-Foot Drain to The Haven at Boston by a new lock, was completed by December 2008, and was officially opened on 20 March 2009. Construction of the second phase of the project, which will involve making the South Forty-Foot Drain navigable from Donington to Guthram Gowt, where a connection with the River Glen will be made, has been delayed by the change in the economic climate, and the complexity of the task.

== Water quality ==
The Environment Agency measure the water quality of the river systems in England. Each is given an overall ecological status, which may be one of five levels: high, good, moderate, poor and bad. There are several components that are used to determine this, including biological status, which looks at the quantity and varieties of invertebrates, angiosperms and fish. Chemical status, which compares the concentrations of various chemicals against known safe concentrations, is rated good or fail.

The water quality of the River Glen system was as follows in 2019.

Section	Ecological Status	Chemical Status	Length	Catchment	Channel
West Glen – Upper	Poor	Fail	14.0 miles (22.5 km)	28.55 square miles (73.9 km^{2})	
The Tham	Moderate	Fail	6.9 miles (11.1 km)	9.38 square miles (24.3 km^{2})	
West Glen – conf West Glen trib to conf East Glen River	Moderate	Fail	18.8 miles (30.3 km)	32.56 square miles (84.3 km^{2})	
Grimsthorpe Park Brook	Good	Fail	2.1 miles (3.4 km)	8.82 square miles (22.8 km^{2})	
East Glen River	Poor	Fail	17.9 miles (28.8 km)	41.25 square miles (106.8 km^{2})	
Glen	Moderate	Fail	16.7 miles (26.9 km)	22.02 square miles (57.0 km^{2})	artificial

The reasons for the quality being less than good include sewage discharge affecting most of the river, physical modification of channels, ground water abstraction, and poor management of agricultural and rural land adjacent to the river system. Like most rivers in the UK, the chemical status changed from good to fail in 2019, due to the presence of polybrominated diphenyl ethers (PBDE), perfluorooctane sulphonate (PFOS) and mercury compounds, none of which had previously been included in the assessment.

== Points of interest ==
Point	Coordinates (Links to map resources)	OS Grid Ref	Notes
Surfleet Seas End sluice	52.8458°N 0.1012°W	TF279292	close to mouth
A16 bridge, Surfleet	52.8409°N 0.1226°W	TF265286	
Pinchbeck railway bridge	52.8179°N 0.1684°W	TF235260	
Guthram Gowt	52.7869°N 0.2624°W	TF172224	
Tongue End pumping station	52.7544°N 0.2894°W	TF155187	outfall from Bourne Eau
Fletland Mill	52.7165°N 0.3677°W	TF103144	
Junction of East and West Glen	52.7066°N 0.3804°W	TF095133	
Edenham bridge	52.7849°N 0.4293°W	TF060219	East Glen
East Glen source	52.8915°N 0.5270°W	SK991336	Ropsley
Start of Greatford Cut	52.6919°N 0.3990°W	TF083116	to Welland at Market Deeping
Essendine bridge	52.7019°N 0.4473°W	TF050127	West Glen
Corby Glen bridge	52.8120°N 0.5247°W	SK995248	West Glen
West Glen source	52.8919°N 0.5596°W	SK970336	Old Somerby

== See also ==
- Rivers of the United Kingdom
