= South Forty-Foot Drain =

Drainage canal in eastern England

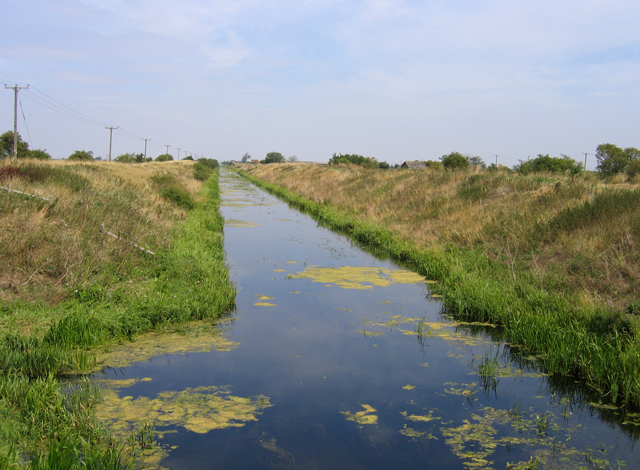
- The South Forty-Foot Drain at Pointon, between Boston and Guthrum Gowt. Here its origin as a drainage channel is very evident.
- Interactive map of South Forty-Foot Drain

Specifications
- Maximum boat length: 70 ft 0 in (21.34 m)
- Maximum boat beam: 20 ft 0 in (6.10 m)
- Locks: 1 (1 or 2 more locks will be required when the drain is joined to the River Glen)
- Maximum height AMSL: −1 ft (−0.30 m)
- Status: Under restoration
- Navigation authority: Environment Agency

History
- Original owner: Black Sluice Commissioners
- Principal engineer: Earl of Lindsey
- Date of act: 1765
- Date of first use: 1846
- Date completed: 1770
- Date closed: 1971
- Date restored: March 2009

Geography
- Start point: The Haven, Boston
- End point: Guthram Gowt

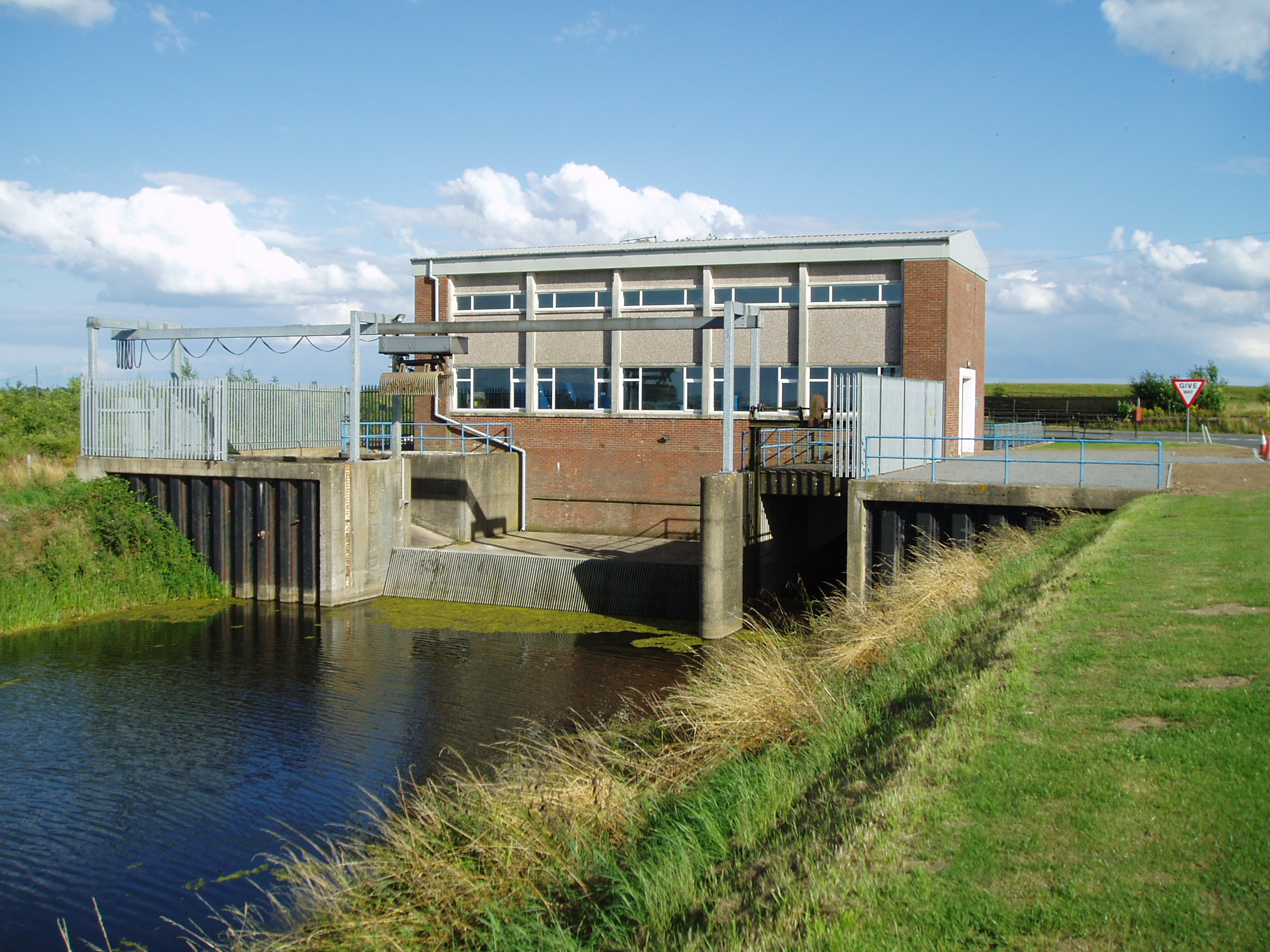
The Holland Fen pumping station, which pumps water from Clay Dike into the South Forty-Foot Drain

The South Forty-Foot Drain, also known as the Black Sluice Navigation, is the main channel for the land-drainage of the Black Sluice Level in the Lincolnshire Fens. It lies in eastern England between Guthram Gowt and the Black Sluice pumping station on The Haven, at Boston. The Drain has its origins in the 1630s, when the first scheme to make the Fen land available for agriculture was carried out by the Earl of Lindsey, and has been steadily improved since then. Water drained from the land entered The Haven by gravity at certain states of the tide until 1946, when the Black Sluice pumping station was commissioned.

The Drain was navigable until 1971, when improvements to the pumping station led to the entrance lock being removed. It is currently being upgraded to navigable status by the Environment Agency, as part of the Fens Waterways Link, with a new entrance lock being completed in December 2008, giving access to the first 12 miles (19 km) of the drain, and the upgrading of the southern section, including a link to the River Glen to allow navigation to Spalding forming phase 2 of the project.

== History ==
The Lincolnshire Fens are an area of low-lying land which have been subject to flooding and attempts to prevent it for centuries. In medieval times, the Midfen Dyke was built to drain the area, but by 1500, this was regarded less as a drain for the land than as a boundary marker between the Parts of Holland and the Parts of Kesteven, two of the three medieval subdivisions of Lincolnshire which functioned as county councils until their abolition in 1974. The first serious attempt to drain the area to the south west of Boston, now known as the Black Sluice Area but formerly known as the Lindsey Level, was from 1635 to 1638, when the Earl of Lindsey agreed with the Commissioners of Sewers for Lincolnshire to carry out drainage works which would make 36,000 acres (150 km^{2}) of land available for agricultural use. The Earl and a group of Adventurers paid for the works, in return for land grants.

The cost of the work was £45,000, and involved the construction of a sluice near Boston, called Skirbeck Sluice, the construction of the first 8 miles (13 km) of the South Forty-Foot Drain, from Boston to Great Hale, the construction of two drains from there to Guthram, which were called the Double Twelves, and the construction of the Clay Dyke Drain. The scheme was not popular with the local fenmen, who made a living from fishing and wildfowling, or with the Commoners, who had a right to graze animals on the common land when it was not flooded. They attempted to get Parliament to rule in their favour, but after three years of trying, they abandoned the idea of legal redress, and took direct action. They destroyed much of the work, as well as buildings and crops, and burnt Skirbeck Sluice. The Earl of Lindsey's contract with the Commissioners of Sewers was revoked by parliament, and it was another hundred years before the next attempt to drain the area.

In an attempt to drain Holland Fen, and prevent flooding from the River Witham, an adventurer called Earl Fitzwilliam constructed a drain in 1720, which runs broadly parallel to the River Witham, and terminated at Lodewick's Gowt, a sluice which he constructed on the Witham close to the location of the present Grand Sluice. The drain was for many years called Earl Fitzwilliam's drain, but is now called the North Forty-Foot Drain. The scheme was not entirely successful.

=== Second Sluice ===
Black Sluice Drainage Act 1765 (Note: Section 2 of the Black Sluice Drainage Amendment Act 1849.)
- Act of Parliament
- Parliament of Great Britain
- Long title: An Act for draining and improving certain Low Marsh and Fen Lands, lying between Boston Haven and Bourn, in the Parts of Kesteven and Holland, in the County of Lincoln.
- Citation: 5 Geo. 3. c. 86 Pr.
- Territorial extent: Great Britain

Dates
- Royal assent: 10 May 1765
- Commencement: 10 January 1765 (Note: Start of session.)
Other legislation
Amended by	Black Sluice Drainage Act 1770; Black Sluice Drainage Act 1846; Black Sluice Drainage Amendment Act 1849; Land Drainage (Black Sluice) Provisional Order Confirmation Act 1925
Relates to	Sutterton Inclosure Act 1772

Status: Amended

Black Sluice Drainage Act 1770
- Act of Parliament
- Parliament of Great Britain
- Long title: An Act for amending and rendering more effectual an Act, made in the Fifth Year of the Reign of His present Majesty, intituled, "An Act for draining and improving certain Low Marsh and Fen Lands lying between Boston Haven and Bourne, in the Parts of Kesteven and Holland, in the County of Lincoln;" and for improving the Navigation through the said Lands.
- Citation: 10 Geo. 3. c. 41 Pr.
- Territorial extent: Great Britain

Dates
- Royal assent: 29 March 1770
- Commencement: 9 January 1770
Other legislation
Amends	Black Sluice Drainage Act 1765
Amended by	Black Sluice Drainage Act 1846; Black Sluice Drainage Amendment Act 1849
Relates to	Skirbeck Inclosure Act 1771; Boston Port and Harbour Act 1812; Land Drainage (Black Sluice) Provisional Order Confirmation Act 1925

Status: Amended

The Witham Drainage Act 1762 (2 Geo. 3. c. 32) among other things constituted the Commissioners of Sewers for the Second and Sixth District, which covered the area including Asgarby, Ewerby, Great Hale, Heckington, Holland Fen, Howell, Little Hale and South Kyme. Much of the area to the south and west of Boston, some 91 square miles (240 km^{2}), was inundated by the Great Flood of 1763, and against this background, the Black Sluice Drainage Act 1765 (5 Geo. 3. c. 86 Pr.) was obtained which created the Black Sluice Commissioners, giving them power to raise taxes and authority to carry out drainage works. The scheme largely revived the Earl of Lindsey's original scheme. The initial design work was carried out by the civil engineer Langley Edwards, on loan from the Witham Commissioners. Some of the surveying was performed by John Landen, who was the steward of the estate of Earl Fitzwilliam at Peterborough, and a proficient amateur mathematician. The two men were jointly appointed Surveyors of the Works, acting as engineers for the scheme, while John Chapman and Richard Strattard were assistants. A new sluice, called the Black Sluice, was built at Boston as a direct replacement for the Skirbeck Sluice, having three openings with a total width of 40 feet (12 m). The 8 miles (13 km) of the drain were scoured from Boston to Great Hale, beyond which the Main Drain was upgraded by cutting a new 14-mile (23 km) channel, effectively extending the South Forty-Foot Drain to Guthram, on the banks of the River Glen. A total of 65 miles (105 km) of highland streams were improved by scouring and raising of the banks. The estimated cost of £16,000 was raised by issuing bonds, but the project overran, and another act of Parliament, the Black Sluice Drainage Act 1770 (10 Geo. 3. c. 41 Pr.) was obtained in 1770 to authorise the raising of the drainage taxes, to cover the difference. By mid-1769, when Landen and Edwards left the project, because the work was largely complete, the scheme had cost £24,000. They were replaced by Edward Hare as Surveyor of Works, with Chapman and Strattard continuing as assistants. A historian called W. H. Wheeler, who chronicled the Lincolnshire fens, wrote that "the works were efficiently carried out and, being well-designed, entirely answered expectation."

On the River Witham, the Grand Sluice was constructed and opened on 15 October 1766, and this prevented tidal water from entering the river, and hence flooding the Holland Fen. The Boston Harbour Commissioners were created by the Boston Port Act 1766, and they carried out improvement works to The Haven, which resulted in lower water levels at the Black Sluice, and hence more efficient draining from the South Forty-Foot Drain. Water was pumped into the drain by a series of windmills driving scoop wheels. Maps of the area produced in 1783 by Edward Hare show 46 such mills, which provided drainage for 32,000 acres (130 km^{2}) of agricultural land. Extreme high tides in 1810 and again in 1820 resulted in widespread flooding, and further thought was given to improving the flood defences.

With the improvements to the River Witham, the final section of Earl Fitzwilliam's drain to Lodewick Gowt was filled in, and the channel was diverted to join the South Forty-Foot Drain. Renamed the North Forty-Foot Drain, it now supplies Cook's Lock and Holland Fen pumping stations.

=== Third Sluice ===
Reports on improvements to the system were produced in 1843 by the surveyor Mr W Lewin and in 1845 by Sir John Rennie. Rennie's scheme involved the provision of a catchwater drain to collect water draining from the higher ground to the west before it entered the fenlands, but an Act of Parliament to authorise its construction was defeated, and so in 1846 a report by Mr W Cubit which proposed improvements to the existing infrastructure was accepted by the Commissioners. A new Black Sluice, including a 20-foot (6.1 m) wide navigation lock, was constructed to the south of the original one, with the cill level 6 feet (1.8 m) lower, which enabled the gradient of the South Forty-Foot Drain to be increased to 3 inches per mile (5 cm/km). Many of the tributary drains were also improved. 1846 also marked the beginning of the use of steam engines for pumping. Ten years later, a map covering 18,000 acres (73 km^{2}) of the Black Sluice area showed nine steam-powered and eight wind-powered drainage engines in use.

The River Witham Outfall Improvement Act 1880 (43 & 44 Vict. c. cliii) authorised further improvements to the mouth of the Witham, to which the Black Sluice Commissioners contributed £65,000. This work led to a further drop of 4 feet (1.2 m) in the low water level at the Black Sluice. Oil and paraffin engines began to replace steam and wind engines from 1910, and by 1935 there were 15 such engines pumping water into the South Forty-Foot Drain. The passing of the Land Drainage Act 1930 resulted in the Commissioners being replaced by the Black Sluice Internal Drainage Board, while responsibility for the rivers in the area passed to the Witham and Steeping Rivers Catchment Board. With war imminent, the Rivers Board took over the Black Sluice and the South Forty-Foot Drain in 1939, and although progress was interrupted by the Second World War, a £374,000 scheme to construct the Black Sluice pumping station and to widen 11 miles (18 km) of the drain from Boston to Donington Bridge was completed in 1946. The pumping station contained three 100-inch (2.5 m) pumps, each powered by a 900-horsepower (670 kW) 5-cylinder vertical diesel engine manufactured by Ruston.

=== Modern era ===
Paraffin and oil engines gave way to electrically powered pumping stations in the 1950s, with the Board constructing six electric and one diesel pumping station to improve drainage to an extra 11,000 acres (45 km^{2}) of land. In 1960, the decision was taken to further improve drainage of an area of 70,000 acres (280 km^{2}), as part of a £1.4 million scheme which included the addition of two extra pumps at the Black Sluice, replacement of existing pumps elsewhere, and the widening of 7 miles (11 km) of the South Forty-Foot Drain from Donington Bridge to Rippingale Running Dyke. Jurisdiction for the Drain and the sluice passed to the Lincolnshire River Board at this time. The work, which began in 1962 and was completed in 1968, proved successful in preventing flooding during severe wet weather in the winter of 1968/9. With three 900-horsepower (670 kW) and two 925-horsepower (690 kW) diesel engines, the upgraded pumping station could pump 800,000 gallons per minute (60 m^{3}/s). Responsibility for the drain and the sluice passed to the National Rivers Authority in 1990, and to the Environment Agency in 1995.

Despite all the improvements, serious flooding occurred in 1999 when the bank of the drain was breached near Pinchbeck. Staff from the Environment Agency and the Black Sluice Internal Drainage Board successfully repaired the breach before properties were flooded, and a review of the flood defences was then carried out. The report recommended improvements to some of the banks, but funding for the work was not available, and so no work was done at the time.

In 2013, the pumping station flooded as a result of a tidal surge. The three engines dating from 1946 were damaged by water ingress, and were decommissioned. The other two engines were at a higher level, and remained operational, but were by that time nearly 50 years old, and nearing the end of their operational life. Refurbishment of the pumping station was estimated to cost between £15 and £20 million, and so the effectiveness of the station was reviewed. The review showed that it had been used for less than 2 days of every 100 days since it was constructed in 1946, and that the station barely affected the number of properties that might be flooded. By using the adjacent gravity sluice and the lock to discharge water from the South Forty-Foot Drain, better control of water levels could be achieved, and this had been demonstrated during a period of heavy rainfall in spring 2018. Accordingly, the remaining two pumps were decommissioned in October 2018, and the Environment Agency began looking at what to do with the building.

== Functions ==
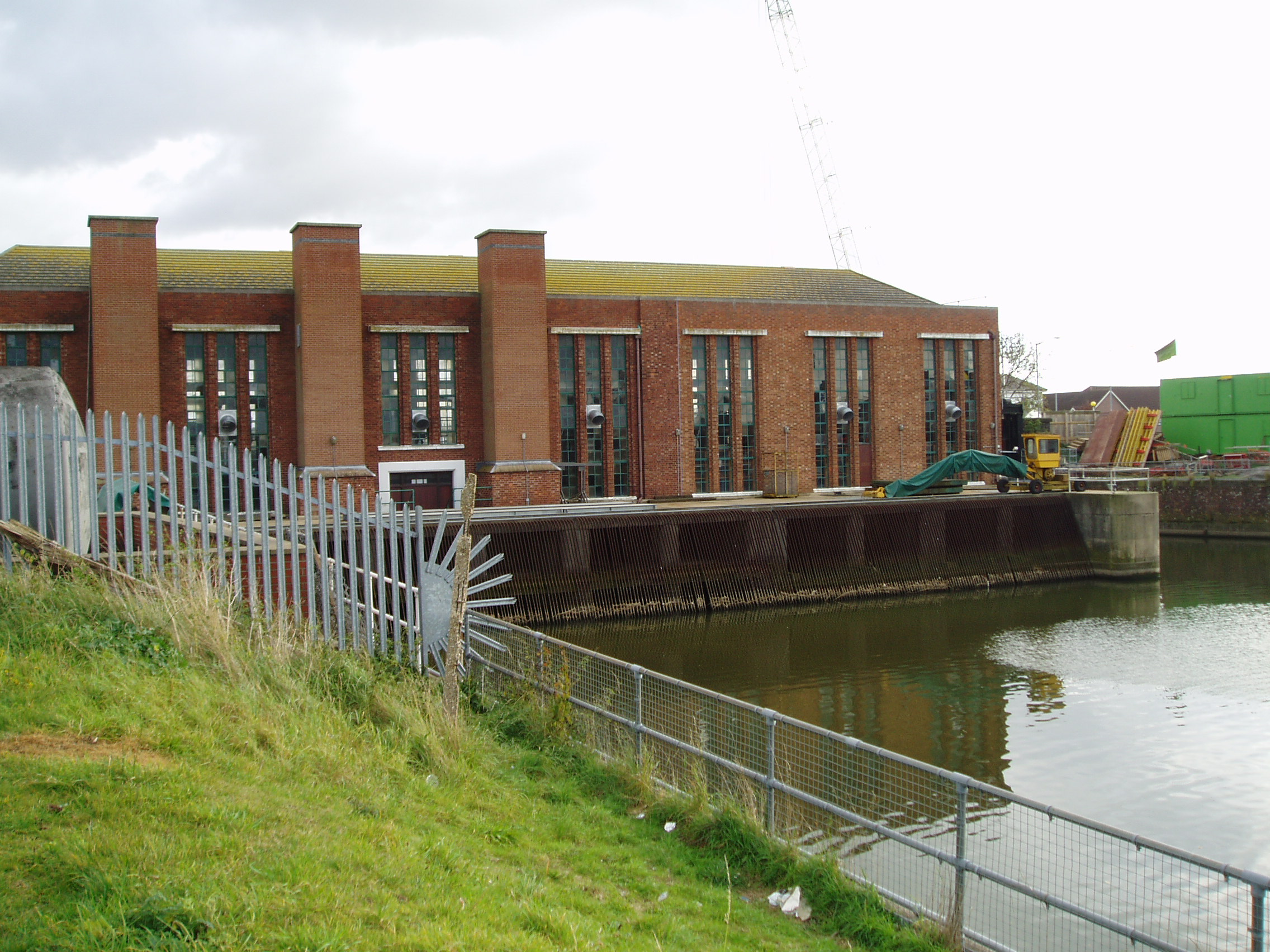
Black Sluice pumping station at Boston, where the Drain meets The Haven, was decommissioned in 2018.

The South Forty-Foot Drain serves as a district boundary over the length where it runs roughly south to north. South of Donington High Bridge, the Drain separates South Kesteven to the west from South Holland to the east. The boundary then continues southwards along the River Glen. North of Donington, the boundary between the borough of Boston to the east and North Kesteven to the west follows the line of the Drain. As the Drain crosses the line of the Midfen Dyke, just before the Nottingham to Boston railway joins it at Great Hale pumping station, the boundary turns northwards, following its medieval course.

The main job of the Drain is to gather the waters pumped from the Kesteven Fens, the Holland Fens and the Weir Dyke, a soak dike in Bourne North Fen, alongside the Bourne Eau and River Glen, northwards and eastwards to the Black Sluice at Boston, where they are discharged to the tidal waters of The Haven. The Weir Dyke takes its name from a weir in the bank of the Bourne Eau at Tongue End, which was constructed by the Black Sluice Commissioners, to allow water from the Bourne Eau to overflow the bank when excess water could not flow into the River Glen in times of flood. The overfall weir became redundant when the Tongue End pumping station was constructed in 1966.

The South Forty-Foot Drain and the Black Sluice pumping station, together with most of the side channels which run into the drain are the responsibility of the Environment Agency. Management of the drainage ditches which drain the Fens are the responsibility of the Black Sluice Internal Drainage Board, who maintain 34 pumping stations and three gravity stations in the region. Of these, 21 are situated on the banks of the Drain, and pump directly into it, while one, the Black Hole Drove pumping station, is constructed over the channel, and acts as a boundary between the part of the Drain managed by the Environment Agency, and that managed by the Drainage Board.

== Navigation ==
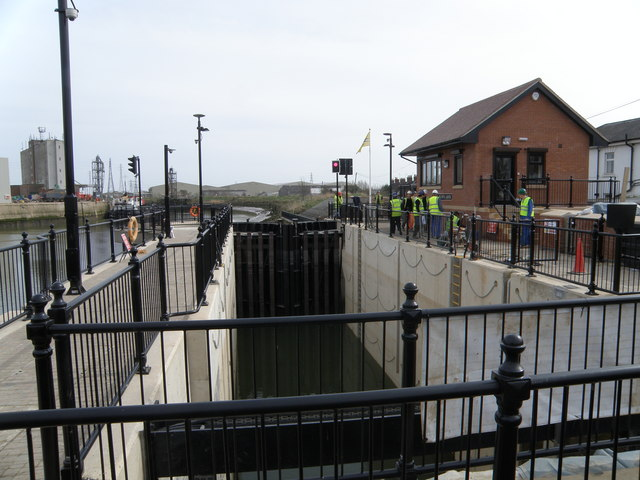
The new lock at Black Sluice, allowing navigation from The Haven to the Drain

Very few details about navigation on the South Forty-Foot Drain have been recorded. Historically, the Drain had been navigable, and in 1939, it was listed as being navigable for 21 miles (34 km), from Boston to Gutham (sic) Gowt. Boats up to 70 feet (21 m) long and 18 feet (5.5 m) wide, with a draught of about 7 or 8 feet (2.1 or 2.4 m) could use the waterway as far as Donington Bridge, but above that, the draught decreased to 3 to 4 feet (0.9 to 1.2 m). It was only open to commercial craft, as pleasure craft were expressly prohibited. It is unclear whether there was ever a right of navigation, or whether the Black Sluice Commissioners simply allowed it. The entrance lock was 72 by 20 feet (21.9 by 6.1 m), and most trade was between Boston and Donnington Bridge. The restriction on use for pleasure boating was removed in 1962.

It is not clear when navigation ceased, with Atkins working for the Environment Agency stating that the lock was closed and removed in 1971, while more recent documents from the Environment Agency state that the lock was closed when the Black Sluice pumping station was extended in 1966, as the extension was built over the top of the original lock. Subsequently, the East Anglian Waterways Association promoted the idea that the Drain could again be made navigable as part of a larger scheme to improve leisure facilities. The local authorities which were part of the Fens Tourism consortium conducted a feasibility study, and this report was formally adopted as the Fens Waterways Link by the Environment Agency in 2004, with the support of the local authorities, the East Anglian Waterways Association and the Inland Waterways Association.

The scheme involved a total of 150 miles (240 km) of waterway, of which 50 miles (80 km) would be new cruiseway, while the rest would be existing waterways which could be upgraded or have their access improved. When completed, it would connect the Rivers Witham, Glen, Welland, Nene and Great Ouse, and was heralded as the biggest waterway enhancement project in Europe by the Environment Agency. In 2007 they obtained funding for the link between Boston and Spalding. Work on a new lock beside the Black Sluice pumping station at Boston - to connect The Haven and the South Forty-Foot Drain - was formally started on 8 February 2008, and was completed in December 2008, with the official opening ceremony being held on 20 March 2009. The lock project formed phase 1 of the scheme, and the cost of £8.5 million was jointly funded by the European Regional Development Fund, the East Midlands Development Agency, and Lincolnshire County Council. The lock is designed to be used for a period either side of high tide, and so there is a rise from the Drain to the Haven. It has conventional mitre gates at one end, but uses rotating sector gates at the tidal end, each one weighing 12.1 tonnes. It is a dual-purpose structure, designed so that it can be used as a sluice to discharge water by gravity when tide levels in The Haven are appropriate.

The lock opened up nearly 12 miles (19 km) of waterway. As part of the upgrade, new 48-hour moorings were constructed on The Haven, for boats about to enter the Drain, and on the South Forty-Foot Drain near the Black Sluice pumping station at Boston, at Swineshead Bridge and at Hubbert's Bridge. The upper limit of navigation was initially Donington High Bridge, where the Swaton Eau joins the South Forty-Foot Drain and provides a wider section where boats can be turned. Beyond the bridge, the drain was officially only suitable for canoes and kayaks. However, eight narrow boats cruised on the waterway at Easter 2009, and although the channel was narrower and not as deep after Donington Bridge, all of them successfully reached Kingston's Bridge, some 3.7 miles (6.0 km) further on, where the outlets from Dowsby Fen and Gosberton pumping stations provided enough width to turn a 70-foot (21 m) boat. Further progress was blocked by scaffolding erected so that the bridge could be re-decked, rather than by lack of water.

The drain has been renamed as the Black Sluice Navigation by the Environment Agency. In order to use the navigation, an Environment Agency licence is required, and as there are no permanent moorings available on the drain, these are available for one day or seven days. Water levels are maintained at a lower level during the winter months, when flows are high, and the Drain needs to be able to cope with higher volumes of rainfall, than during the summer months, when navigable levels are maintained. As on the neighbouring River Witham, the switch between winter and summer levels is normally made at the beginning of April.

=== Development ===
Phase 2 of the Fens Waterway project involves the link between Donington Bridge and Crowland and Cowbit Washes, which are located on the River Welland near Spalding. In order to make the financing of the phase more viable, it was split into two halves, with phase 2a covering the section from Donington to Surfleet Seas End on the River Glen, and phase 2b covering from there onwards. The initial technical assessment and obtaining of planning permission for phase 2, which involved widening of the South Forty-Foot Drain from Donington to a new road crossing under the A151, a new lock and a junction with the River Glen at Guthram Gowt was funded by the East Midlands Development Agency. This section would involve changes at Black Hole Drove pumping station, which has been built across the drain and hence would prevent navigation. Major contracts for this phase were expected to be awarded in April 2009, but appraisal of the technical assessment revealed that more than one route needed to be considered before the best solution could be selected. While the obvious solution would be to connect the Glen and the drain where they are only a short distance apart, the Lincolnshire Waterways Partnership also considered the creation of new channels up to 9.3 miles (15.0 km) long to form the link. In the meantime, the economic situation changed, so that sources of funding were not so freely available, and by the end of 2010, no clear dates had been set for the next construction phase.

By late 2011, there were ten different routes under consideration, and an assessment of them was expected to be delivered in spring 2012. Halcrow Group, the engineering consultancy, were responsible for carrying out the assessment, which looked at the benefits that each route might provide, not only for navigation but also for water quality, water resources and habitat for wildlife. The study was expected to provide a short-list of routes, which would then be the subject of further consultation. By mid-2012, the merits of the ten routes had been considered, including the economic, environmental and technical issues involved, and a broad outline of the corridor for the link was scheduled to be published in September. After that, consultation with landowners and stakeholders took place, to establish the final route, for which design of the channel and the associated locks, bridges, moorings and pumping stations could then begin. By the end of the assessment process for the ten routes, two remained. One was route 1, the original suggestion which used the existing course of the South Forty-Foot Drain for most of its length, while the second was a new route, designated as route 11. Route 11 had become the preferred route by the summer of 2014. It involves widening the South Forty-Foot Drain from Donington to Surfleet, to a point near to the Black Hole Drove pumping station. A new lock would be needed at this location, but would connect to a new channel, rather than to the rest of the drain. It would pass under a new bridge on the A151, and the connection to the River Glen would involve another new lock. An environmental survey of other watercourses near to the route revealed that several provide habitat for nationally important plants and invertebrates.

=== Precursors ===
The idea of a link between the South Forty-Foot Drain and the River Nene is not new, as the first plans for such a connection were proposed in 1809. In that year, proposals for a new canal between the Oakham Canal at Oakham and the Stamford Canal at Stamford, which had been discussed in 1785, were revived, as part of a larger plan for a 7-mile (11 km) link from Stamford to the River Nene at Peterborough, and a connection from near Market Deeping, where the Stamford Canal rejoined the River Welland, northwards to the South Forty-Foot Drain. A bill for this, together with one for a rival scheme to link Stamford to the Grand Junction Canal, which also included a connection to the South Forty-Foot Drain, were put before Parliament in 1811, but neither met with any success. The idea was raised again in 1815 and 1828, but no further action was taken.

== Route ==
Point	Coordinates (Links to map resources)	OS Grid Ref	Notes
Tongue End	52.754°N 0.289°W	TF155187	Weir Dyke near where Bourne Eau joins the River Glen
Guthram	52.788°N 0.265°W	TF170225	Engine Drain and Weir Dyke join to form South Forty-Foot Drain (SFF)
Caswall's Bridge	52.832°N 0.271°W	TF165274	Pumping stations on both sides of the SFF
Kingston's Bridge	52.849°N 0.276°W	TF162293	The Twenty Foot Drain is a re-used part of the Lindsey Level works
Donington High Bridge	52.905°N 0.257°W	TF173356	SFF will be widened from here to Guthram as part of Fens Waterways Link
Eau End	52.934°N 0.242°W	TF182388	The drain to the east was a part of the Medieval Midfen Dyke
Wragmer Stake	52.956°N 0.224°W	TF184413	The SFF turns to the north east
Bicker Haven	52.967°N 0.202°W	TF208426	The SFF turns east to Boston
North Forty-foot drain	52.970°N 0.045°W	TF314431	The junction between the two systems
Black Sluice	52.966°N 0.026°W	TF326428	End of the SFF and Site of a new lock

== Water quality ==
The Environment Agency measure the water quality of the river systems in England. Each is given an overall ecological status, which may be one of five levels: high, good, moderate, poor and bad. There are several components that are used to determine this, including biological status, which looks at the quantity and varieties of invertebrates, angiosperms and fish. Chemical status, which compares the concentrations of various chemicals against known safe concentrations, is rated good or fail. The South Forty-Foot Drain is designated as "heavily modified", which means that the channels have been altered by human activity, and the criteria for this designation are defined by the Water Framework Directive.

The water quality of the South Forty-Foot Drain was as follows in 2019.

Section	Ecological Status	Chemical Status	Length	Catchment	Channel
Black Sluice IDB draining to the South Forty Foot Drain	Moderate	Fail	21.6 miles (34.8 km)	172.67 square miles (447.2 km^{2})	heavily modified

Reasons for the water quality being less than good include physical modification of the channel, which prevents the free movement of fish and other organisms along the waterway, discharge from sewage treatment works, and runoff from agricultural land. Like most waterways in the UK, the chemical status was rated as fail in 2019, due to the presence of polybrominated diphenyl ethers (PBDE) and mercury compounds, neither of which had previously been included in the assessment. Prior to 2019, there were issues with tributyltin compounds being discharged into the system, which also affected chemical status.

== See also ==
- Canals of Great Britain
- History of the British canal system
- Fens Waterways Link

== Bibliography ==
- Atkins (24 October 2003). "Fens Waterway Link, Navigation Appendix" (PDF). Environment Agency. Archived from the original (PDF) on 15 February 2012.
- Darby, H C (1968). The Draining of the Fens. Cambridge University Press. ISBN 978-1-10740298-0.
- Hadfield, Charles (1970). The Canals of the East Midlands. David and Charles. ISBN 978-0-7153-4871-0.
- Miles, W. D. (1976). A History of the Drainage of Bourne South Fen and Thurlby Fen. Welland and Deepings IDB.
- Skempton, Sir Alec; et al. (2002). A Biographical Dictionary of Civil Engineers in Great Britain and Ireland: Vol 1: 1500 to 1830. Thomas Telford. ISBN 978-0-7277-2939-2.
- Sly, Rex (2003). From Punt to Plough - A History of the Fens. Stroud, England: Sutton Publishers. ISBN 978-0-7509-3398-8.
- Wilson, W Eric (1939). Inland Waterways of Great Britain (1st ed.). London, England: Imray Laurie Noray and Wilson.
