= Anthony Worth =

English farmer and politician (1940–2017)

Anthony James Longmore Worth CVO (23 February 1940 – 8 November 2017), also known as Tony Worth, was an English farmer and politician, who served as Lord Lieutenant of Lincolnshire.

== Early life and education ==
Worth was born on 23 February 1940, the son of George Arthur Worth and Janet, the daughter of Air Chief Marshal Sir Arthur Longmore. The Worth family have long been established as farmers and landowners in the vicinity of Holbeach in Lincolnshire.

Worth was educated at Marlborough College, Iowa State University and Sidney Sussex College, Cambridge.

== Career ==
Having worked as a farm labourer in Iowa, a waiter and a London tour guide, Worth spent three years as a farm management consultant in Victoria (Australia) before returning to England in 1968 to manage his family's farming company in Holbeach Marsh, which now farms some 4,500 acres of silt land and produces entirely arable crops.

Worth served as Chairman of South Holland Internal Drainage Board, as a member of the executive committee of the Association of Drainage Authorities, as a member of the Anglian Regional Flood Defence Committee and as Chairman of the Welland & Nene Local Defence Committee of the Environment Agency.

He was a former President of the Lincolnshire Agricultural Society and was also a member of the National Executive Committee and Board of the Country Land and Business Association, a member of the Board of Governors of the University of Lincoln and Chairman of the Lincolnshire Probation Board from 1999 to 2001. He was also for five years Chairman of the European Initiative for the Promotion of Sustainable Agriculture (EISA).

In the last years of his life, Worth worked on creating a lasting memorial to RAF Bomber Command in Lincolnshire. The memorial emphasises the shared sacrifice and suffering of bombing campaigns globally during the Second World War. The International Bomber Command Centre in Lincoln is his lasting legacy.

== Honours ==
Worth was appointed High Sheriff of Lincolnshire in 1990 and Lord Lieutenant of Lincolnshire on 30 October 2008.

In 2005, he received an honorary degree from the University of Lincoln.

He was appointed Commander of the Royal Victorian Order (CVO) in the 2015 New Year Honours.

== Personal life ==
Worth married his wife Jenny in 1964; they had four children. He died on 8 November 2017, aged 77.
