= Water Management Alliance =

The Water Management Alliance is an unincorporated consortium of internal drainage boards (IDBs) in England, centred on services provided by Kings Lynn Internal Drainage Board. Using powers created by the Land Drainage Act 1991, the legal status of the organisation is denoted by King's Lynn IDB trading as “the WMA”. In March 2023 the East Suffolk IDB became the East Suffolk Water Management Board.

== Members of the consortium ==
The consortium consists of:

- Broads IDB (2006)
- East Suffolk Water Management Board formerly the East Suffolk IDB
- King's Lynn IDB
- Norfolk Rivers IDB
- Pevensey and Cuckmere WLMB
- South Holland IDB
- Waveney, Lower Yare and Lothingland IDB
