= Witham Navigable Drains =

Drainage canals in Lincolnshire, England

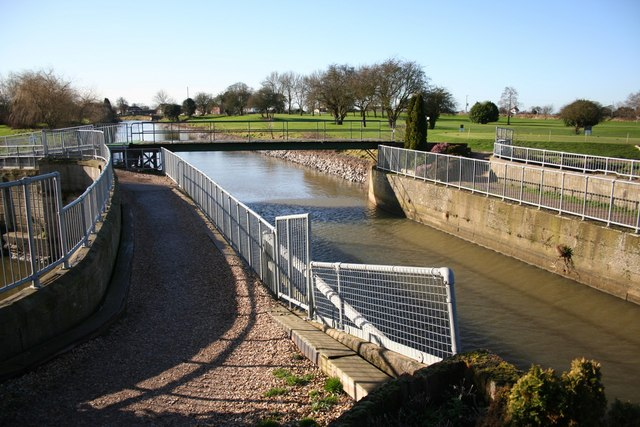
- Cowbridge Aqueduct carries the Stonebridge Drain over the Cowbridge Drain

Specifications
- Maximum boat length: 70 ft 0 in (21.34 m)
- Maximum boat beam: 10 ft 0 in (3.05 m)
- Locks: 2 (3 other locks are defunct)
- Status: Navigable in summer
- Navigation authority: Witham Fourth District IDB

History
- Original owner: Witham Fourth Drainage District
- Principal engineer: various
- Date of act: 1801
- Date of first use: 1780s

Geography
- Start point: Anton's Gowt, Boston
- End point: various

The Witham Navigable Drains are located in Lincolnshire, England, and are part of a much larger drainage system managed by the Witham Fourth District Internal Drainage Board. The Witham Fourth District comprises the East Fen and West Fen, to the north of Boston, which together cover an area of 97 square miles (250 km^{2}). In total there are over 438 miles (705 km) of drainage ditches, of which under 60 miles (97 km) are navigable. Navigation is normally only possible in the summer months, as the drains are maintained at a lower level in winter, and are subject to sudden changes in level as a result of their primary drainage function, which can leave boats stranded. Access to the drains is from the River Witham at Anton's Gowt Lock.

The area is bounded by the River Witham to the south and west, and the Steeping River to the north. Since the 11th century, there have been attempts to prevent the fens from flooding, so that they could be used for agriculture. A major advance was made in the seventeenth century, when Adventurers built drains in return for rights to some of the reclaimed land, but the success was short-lived, as Fenmen and Commoners rioted in 1642 and destroyed the works. Further attempts to drain the fens were made in the 18th century, and the first proposals to use the drains for navigation were made in 1779.

Most of the drainage ditches that are now evident were constructed under the authority of Wildmore and East and West Fens Drainage Act 1801 (41 Geo. 3. (U.K.) c. cxxxv). The plans for the scheme were drawn up by the civil engineer John Rennie. Better drainage was achieved from the 1860s, with the building of steam pumping stations. The steam engines were later replaced by diesel engines, and now many of them use electric pumps. Sensitive restoration of some of the pumping stations in the 1980s and 1990s resulted in the Witham Fourth District IDB being given a Design Award.

There were originally five locks on the system, including Anton's Gowt Lock. Cowbridge Lock is the only other one still operational. Access by boat to Cowbridge Drain and Hobhole Drain which drain the East Fen is no longer possible, because East Fen Lock, which connected Cowbridge Drain to the rest of the system has been filled in, while the lock chamber at Lade Bank Pumping Station has been reused to house extra pumps. Many of the structures built as part of Rennie's upgrade in the early 1800s survive in near-original condition, and are Grade II listed.

== Geography ==
The area in which the drains lie is fenland, most of it at about sea level, and is bounded to the south west by the River Witham and to the south east by a low silt ridge of marine origin which separates it from The Wash. The northern boundary is defined by Coningsby to the north west, Spilsby and the southern edge of the Lincolnshire Wolds to the north, and Wainfleet and the Steeping River to the north east. It is divided into the East Fen and the West Fen, separated by a strip of higher ground, some 7 miles (11 km) long and 0.5 miles (0.8 km) wide, on which are situated the villages of Stickford, Stickney and Sibsey. The A16 road follows this higher ground, which is glacial in origin. Historically, the south western section of the West Fen close to the River Witham was called the Wildmore Fen, but hydraulically, they form a single fen. In total, the fens occupy an area of around 97 square miles (250 km^{2}).

Most of the fens were extra-parochial, consisting of a huge common, on which people from the surrounding villages had grazing rights. These could only be exercised in summer, as prior to drainage works being carried out, the East Fen drained northwards to the Steeping River, and during the winter months, most of that river discharged into the fen, causing widespread flooding.

== History ==
The area has been subject to flooding for centuries, both from the rivers and from the sea. While there is evidence for occupation of the region by Romans, Saxons, Danes and Normans, the first references to flood defences occur in the 11th and 12th centuries, when monks built a sea bank to hold back tides from their agricultural land. A sluice was constructed in 1142 on the River Witham to improve it for navigation, and commissions of sewers were appointed in the 13th century. They were empowered to investigate any problems with the drainage of the region, could appoint contractors to carry out work to rectify such problems, and had to assess how this work would be financed. Floods in 1394 resulted in a decision to rebuild a floodgate at Waynflete, with the villages affected paying the construction costs.

Attempts to enlarge some of the drains in the East and West Fens are recorded by the Duchy of Lancaster in 1532. Wainfleet Haven was thought to be unsuitable as an outlet for the water, which was consequently routed to the River Witham and the Boston Haven. The first Maud Foster drain was cut in 1568, from Cowbridge to The Haven, but in 1631 it was inadequate, as there was widespread flooding in both fens, which resulted in Sir Anthony Thomas, John Warsopp and other Adventurers being commissioned to enlarge the Maud Foster drain and build a new outfall where it discharged into The Haven. As there was no money to pay for the works, the Adventurers were to be given land from that which had been drained in recompense. They spent around £30,000, and were given 16,300 acres (6,600 ha), which yielded rent of £8,000 per year. A further £20,000 was spent on improving the land they had been given. Not everyone was in favour of the work, as in 1642 many of those who formerly had common rights to the land formed a mob, and destroyed sluices, houses and crops. Their actions probably included destroying the new Maud Foster sluice. The Adventurers petitioned the House of Lords, but were unsuccessful in the House of Commons, where they were opposed by the Commoners. The House of Commons ruled that the justices of the peace should prevent and suppress riots, but did not take sides with either party. Legal action followed, which the Commoners won, with the result that the Court of Sewers were again responsible for drainage matters, but the ditches and sluices remained ruined for many year. Maud Foster drain was widened again in 1734, when another new sluice was built. The Witham Fourth Drainage District Commissioners were created by act of Parliament, the Witham Drainage Act 1762 (2 Geo. 3. c. 32), but the East Fen and the area managed by the Court of Sewers were specifically excluded from their sphere of influence.

Witham Drainage Act 1762
- Act of Parliament
- Parliament of Great Britain
- Long title: An Act for draining and preserving certain low lands called the Fens, lying on both sides of the river Witham, in the county of Lincoln; and for restoring and maintaining the navigation of the said river, from the High Bridge, in the city of Lincoln, through the borough of Boston, to the sea.
- Citation: 2 Geo. 3. c. 32
- Territorial extent: Great Britain

Dates
- Royal assent: 2 June 1762
- Commencement: 3 November 1761 (Note: Start of session.)
Other legislation
Amended by	Wildmore and East and West Fens Drainage Act 1801; Wildmore Fen Drainage Act 1803; River Witham Drainage and Navigation Act 1808; River Witham Drainage and Navigation Act 1812
Relates to	Boston Port and Harbour Act 1812; Lincolnshire Drainage Act 1840; Lincoln Waterworks Act 1846; Black Sluice Drainage (Amendment) Act 1849; Witham Drainage (Hobhole Sluice) Act 1887

Status: Amended

Text of statute as originally enacted

As the drains became wider and more extensive, there were proposals to use them for navigation, and a lock at Anton's Gowt was first suggested in 1779. Funds were not available at the time, and so land doors were built so that boats could access the drains until the lock was completed in 1813.

=== Civil engineering ===
In 1784, Mill Drain was enlarged, with the intention of using it to drain parts of the East Fen, but this action was stopped by Fenmen blocking the drain, as they lived by fishing, fowling and cutting reeds, and these activities were threatened by drainage. A petition was presented to the Commissioners, signed by 105 Fenmen, of whom 86 were sufficiently literate to write their own name. As a result, a sluice was built on Valentine's Drain, which maintained the water level in the East Fen at a height sufficient to allow the Fenmen to continue their way of life. A series of reports had been made during the eighteenth century by the civil engineers John Smeaton, John Grundy, Sr., his son John Grundy, Jr., Langley Edwards, and others, but no action had been taken to implement them. With Sir Joseph Banks of Revesby Abbey pushing for a solution, the civil engineer John Rennie was asked to produce a plan for the drainage of both fens. Anthony Bower and James Murray carried out the surveys, and Rennie produced his report in September 1800. He concluded that the outfalls at Wainfleet and Maud Foster was inadequate, and that the internal drainage of the fens was not effective. He suggested catchwater drains to collect the runoff from the Wolds to prevent it entering the fens, and a new tidal sluice at Hobhole, closer to the Wash than the Maud Foster outlet. After some minor disputes were resolved, the plan formed the basis for an act of Parliament obtained in 1801.

The 1801 act was supplemented by a second act of Parliament obtained two years later. The principal engineering works were the West Fen Catchwater Drain, a 13.4-mile (21.6 km) channel around the northern edge of the West Fen; the East Fen Catchwater Drain, a 9.4-mile (15.1 km) channel around the northern edge of the East Fen; the Stonebridge Drain, a 4.2-mile (6.8 km) channel which connected Cherry Corner to Cowbridge; upgrading of the Maud Foster drain and the provision of a new sluice where it met The Haven; and construction of the Hobhole Drain, running for 13.5 miles (21.7 km) from Toynton St Peter to the new Hobhole sluice. Most of the main drains which are now navigable were excavated or improved as part of this work, including Castle Dyke, Frith Bank Drain, Medlam Drain, Newham Drain and West Fen Drain in the West Fen. In addition to Hobhole Drain, Barlode Drain, Bellwater Drain, Fodder Dyke, Lade Bank Drain and Thorpe Drain were constructed in the East Fen. Hobhole Sluice was opened in 1806 and Rennie's new Maud Foster Sluice was completed in the following year. Under the acts of Parliament, the Drainage District was extended to include the East Fen. Although Boston was flooded in 1810, the East and West Fens were declared to be in good order soon afterwards.

The construction of Hobhole sluice was the first time that a steam engine is known to have been used in connection with Fens drainage. In order to keep the foundations for the sluice free from water, they were pumped out by a Boulton & Watt steam engine, rated at 6 hp (4.5 kW). The machine lasted until at least 1814, just three years before the first permanent steam pumping station was built at Sutton St. Edmund in South Holland. There is a small drain that runs eastwards from the Medlam Drain to New Bolingbroke. This was probably built by John Parkingson in the early 19th century, to provide canal access to the village which he hoped would become a market town.

The Fourth District was extended in 1818, following another report by Rennie on the lower reaches of the Steeping River. An act of Parliament was obtained in the same year, which authorised the straightening of the river, and the addition of 6,740 acres (2,730 ha), subsequently known as "the 5000 acres", to the district. This area was located on the north-eastern bank of the Steeping River, and its main drainage channel was connected to the Bell Water Drain by three oval brick tunnels, each 47 yards (43 m) long, which pass under the river. The tunnels were completed in 1821, and were entirely hidden until the construction of Lade Bank pumping station in 1867 lowered the water levels.

=== Pumped drainage ===
The 1860s saw the first attempts to drain the Fens by pumping, as suitable steam engines became available. Ground levels in the extensive area of peat land in the northern half of the East Fen had been steadily falling since the fen was first drained and the Witham Drainage (Fourth District) Act 1867 (30 & 31 Vict. c. cxxxviii) authorised the construction of a steam-driven pumping station at Lade Bank, which was completed by September, to resolve this problem. Silting below the Hobhole sluice was remedied by the provisions of the Witham Outfall improvement Act, passed later in the same year. Lade Bank pumping station had two pump wells, each containing an Appold double-inlet pump, and each was driven by a pair of high-pressure condensing steam engines. A pair of engines was rated at 240 horsepower (180 kW) and could pump 350 tons per minute (514 Megalitres per day (Mld)). The cost of the installation was £17,000.

A royal commission in 1927 considered the part played by the various types of drainage bodies, and the Land Drainage Act 1930 (20 & 21 Geo. 5. c. 44) sought to unify these, by creating Catchment Boards, responsible for the main rivers, and internal drainage boards, responsible for the drainage of low-lying areas such as the Fens. The act also expanded the Fourth District to include the area formerly managed by the Skirbeck Court of Sewers, and the Witham Fourth District IDB became the responsible body for drainage from 1 April 1935. Thorpe Culvert pumping station was built and commissioned in 1938, to pump water from the 5000 acres into the Steeping River. Rennie's tunnels were retained, but water only passes into the East Fen at low flows, and a sluice protects the upstream entrance to the tunnels. Upgrading of Lade Bank pumping station from steam engines to oil was completed in 1940, with new equipment consisting of three Ruston diesel engines connected to 50-inch (130 cm) Gwynnes pumps, installed in a new building. The old building was retained, although the steam engines which if housed were scrapped. Soon after the Second World War, plans for a pumping station at Hobhole sluice, to replace the gravity outfall, were approved, and the station was fully commissioned in 1957. The disastrous North Sea flood of 1953, which affected so much of the East Coast of England had little effect in the Fourth District.

In 1956, work started on a new outfall for the Hobhole drain, to the south-east of the old sluices. A pumping station containing three Allen diesel engines was built, each driving a 88-inch (220 cm) pump. The station could discharge 800 tons per minute (1175 Mld) when all three pumps were running. Once the station was complete, the old sluice was blocked off. Further improvements to the drainage of the area occurred in the next few years, with a pumping station being built at Wrangle Horseshoe, at the eastern edge of the district, in 1959, and the first electric pump being installed at Lade Bank pumping station in 1963. The electric motor drove a 36-inch (91 cm) pump. Two new pumping stations at Leverton and Benington were completed in 1976, again on the eastern edge and pumping directly into The Wash. The pumping station at Thorpe Culvert was managed by the Anglian Water Authority, but a replacement in 1983 was partly funded by the Fourth District. The Hobhole pumping station was modified in 1988, when the old sluice channel was reopened and the sluices were fitted with four 33-inch (84 cm) submersible electric pumps, manufactured by Flygt. The number of electric pumps at Lade Bank was increased to three in 1990. These schemes resulted in the Fourth District being awarded a Borough of Boston Civic Design Award for the way in which the buildings were renovated.

== Navigation ==
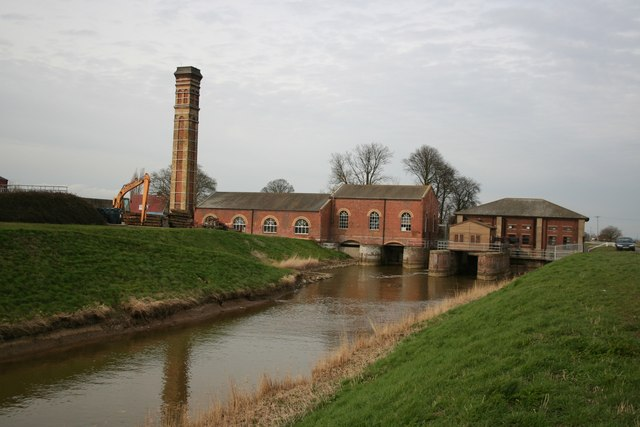
Lade Bank pumping station on Hobhole Drain, where there was once a lock

Historically, the drains were used for importing coal to the fens and exporting agricultural produce. They are now only used for pleasure cruising; this is restricted to the summer months, for between October and April, the water levels are maintained at a low level, so that there is scope to deal with high volumes of rainfall. Consequently, there is insufficient depth for navigation, and operation of the sluices can cause rapid changes in water level. Between April and October, their function is to provide irrigation water for agriculture, and so they are maintained at a higher level, although changes in level can still occur at short notice.

Anton's Gowt lock is 75 by 18 feet (22.9 by 5.5 m), but although a boat of this size could pass through it, most of the drains are inaccessible to such large craft. The only other working lock is at Cowbridge, which is 70 by 10 feet (21.3 by 3.0 m), and gives access to the Maud Foster drain, enabling boats to visit the centre of Boston. From Cowbridge Lock it is also possible to visit the Lincolnshire Wolds, using the Stonebridge Drain and the East Fen and West Fen Catchwater Drains.

It used to be possible to navigate Cowbridge Drain and Hobhole Drain, but they are isolated from the rest of the system by the derelict East Fen Lock. Restoration of this lock was proposed by the Lincolnshire Branch of the Inland Waterways Association in 1975, who sought to encourage use of the drains by offering a plaque to boats that used Cowbridge Lock, but no progress has been made with this, and the lock has been infilled. Hagnaby Lock, near the top of the West Fen Catchwater Drain has no gates, but it is usually possible to pass straight through, while the lock which bypassed Lade Bank pumping station on the Hobhole Drain has been converted to a sluice.

In addition to sudden changes in water levels, there are a number of very low bridges with an air draft of less than 6 feet (1.8 m), which can cause problems if the water levels rise a little, and there are often no turning places at the end of the drains. Cruising can be hazardous due to weed growth, which forms a dense blanket in some channels, but a drain that was formerly virtually un-navigable may suddenly be cleared to improve its drainage performance and become navigable again. One unexpected possibility of cruising the drains is to visit New York, a hamlet just to the north of Hough Bridge on the West Fen Drain.

== Structures ==
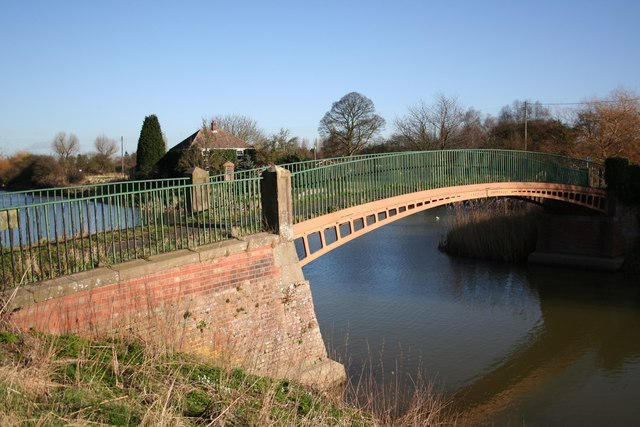
The Grade II listed cast iron footbridge near Cowbridge lock, made at Butterley Works in 1811

The relative isolation of much of the Witham Navigable Drains has resulted in many of the structures which were built as part of Rennie's upgrade in the early 1800s surviving. Because of their historic interest, they have been added to the listed structures register, and are Grade II Listed. They include a series of red-brick bridges with gritstone coping. On the Hobhole Drain, Freiston Bridge has three elliptical arches, while Ings Bridge, Hodsons Bridge (Bridge No. 8), Bridge No. 9, and Station Bridge (Bridge No. 10) have a single arch. Hobhole Sluice, which is constructed of gritstone ashlar, was retained when the Hobhole pumping station was opened in 1957. Both the 1805 buildings and those from the 1867 upgrade were retained at Lade Bank when the new pumping station was built in 1938.

On the Cowbridge Drain, Baker's Bridge is another 3-arched bridge, which is listed with the adjacent sluice, while Mastin's Bridge is a single-span structure. On the Maud Foster Drain, Rawson's Bridge is an original single-span bridge, but further south, Bargate Bridge carries the A16 road over the drain in the centre of Boston. In order to accommodate additional traffic, the Department of Transport demolished the south side of the bridge in 1972, and widened the carriageway. A new south face was then constructed, using the original materials and to the same design. Two footbridges survive, built of cast iron in 1811 by the Butterley Works. The works was established in 1790 by Benjamin Outram at Ripley, Derbyshire. One is the Hospital Bridge in Boston, while the second is near Cowbridge Lock. Both carry the text "CAST AT BUTTERLEY 1811" stamped into the girders, and are supported by gritstone piers. Vauxhall Bridge, a third example of the type, was replaced by a road bridge in 1924. At the south end of the drain, Maud Foster sluice survives largely in original condition, although some alterations were made in the twentieth century. It consists of three elliptical arches, with gates made of timber and iron bindings. They are raised and lowered by pulleys mounted on an overhead gantry. The entrance lock at Anton's Gowt is also listed. It was altered in 1848 when the Great Northern Railway Lincolnshire loop line crossed the northern end of the lock.

Nunn's Bridge is the first bridge to cross the Hobhole Drain to the north of Hobhole Sluice. It has a span of 72 feet (22 m), and when erected in 1948 was the first pre-stressed concrete bridge cast in situ in Britain. L G Mouchel and Partners were the designers, and the work was carried out using labour from the Fourth District IDB, overseen by G E Buchner.

== Water quality ==
The Environment Agency measure the water quality of the river systems in England. Each is given an overall ecological status, which may be one of five levels: high, good, moderate, poor and bad. There are several components that are used to determine this, including biological status, which looks at the quantity and varieties of invertebrates, angiosperms and fish. Chemical status, which compares the concentrations of various chemicals against known safe concentrations, is rated good or fail. The Witham Navigable Drains are designated as "artificial", which means that the channels have been created by human activity.

The water quality of the Witham Navigable Drains was as follows in 2019.

Section	Ecological Status	Chemical Status	Length	Catchment	Channel
East & West Fen Drains	Moderate	Fail	43.4 miles (69.8 km)	143.54 square miles (371.8 km^{2})	artificial

The water quality in the river has deteriorated since 2014, when it was rated good for ecological status. In 2015 it was rated moderate and is now rated bad. The main reason for this is that the drains are artificial, with the land drainage functions and flow having a detrimental effect on fish populations. Like most rivers in the UK, the chemical status changed from good to fail in 2019, due to the presence of polybrominated diphenyl ethers (PBDE), perfluorooctane sulphonate (PFOS) and mercury compounds, none of which had previously been included in the assessment.

== Location ==
Point	Coordinates (Links to map resources)	OS Grid Ref	Notes
Antons Gowt Lock	53.009°N 0.064°W	TF300474	
Maud Foster Sluice	52.968°N 0.013°W	TF335430	
Hobhole Pumping Station	52.939°N 0.031°E	TF366399	
Cowbridge Lock	53.005°N 0.022°W	TF328471	
Lade Bank Pumping Station	53.070°N 0.057°E	TF379544	
Revesby Bridge	53.124°N 0.050°W	TF306603	
Leverton Pumping Station	53.0039°N 0.1366°E	TF434473	
Wrangle Pumping Station	53.0355°N 0.1881°E	TF468509	
Bennington Pumping Station	52.9788°N 0.1105°E	TF418444	
Thorpe Culvert Pumping Station	53.1211°N 0.1970°E	TF471604	

== See also ==
- Canals of the United Kingdom
- History of the British canal system
- Witham First District IDB
- Witham Third District IDB
- Upper Witham IDB

== Bibliography ==
- Barton, Barry M J (August 2011). "John Rennie and the drainage of the Witham Fens, Lincolnshire, UK". Proceedings of the Institution of Civil Engineers - Engineering History and Heritage. Engineering History and Heritage. 163 (EH3). Institution of Civil Engineers: 175–187. doi:10.1680/ehah.2011.164.3.175. ISSN 1757-9430.
- Boyes, John; Russell, Ronald (1977). The Canals of Eastern England. David and Charles. ISBN 978-0-7153-7415-3.
- Cane, Ivan (October 2011). Witham Navigable Drains (PDF). Vol. The Easterling. East Anglian Waterways Association. Archived (PDF) from the original on 1 April 2016.
- Cumberlidge, Jane (2009). Inland Waterways of Great Britain (8th Ed.). Imray Laurie Norie and Wilson. ISBN 978-1-84623-010-3.
- Fisher, Stuart (2013). British River Navigations. Bloomsbury Publishing. ISBN 978-1-4729-0084-5.
- Hinde, K. S. G. (2006). Fenland Pumping Engines. Landmark Publishing Ltd. ISBN 978-1-84306-188-5.
- Nicholson (2006). Nicholson Guides (Vol 6): Nottingham, York and the North East. Harper Collins Publishers. ISBN 978-0-00-721114-2.
- Squires, Roger (2008). Britain's restored canals. Landmark Publishing. ISBN 978-1-84306-331-5.
- Wheeler, William Henry; Batty, Leonard Charles (1896). A History of the Fens of South Lincolnshire. British Library Historical Print Collections. ISBN 978-1-241-32839-9.
