= George Carleton =

George Carleton may refer to:

- George Carleton (bishop) (1559–1628), bishop of Chichester
- George Carleton (MP) (1529–1590), MP for Dorchester and Poole
- George Carleton (actor) (1885–1950), American character actor
- George Carleton (died 1590), landowner in South Holland, Lincolnshire and pioneer of fen drainage

== See also ==
- George Carleton Lacy (1888–1951), American Methodist missionary
