= List of shipwrecks in September 1828 =

The list of shipwrecks in September 1828 includes all ships sunk, foundered, grounded, or otherwise lost during September 1828.

== 2 September ==
List of shipwrecks: 2 September 1828
Ship	State	Description
Olive Branch	United Kingdom	The ship foundered in the Grand Banks of Newfoundland. Her crew were rescued. She was on a voyage from Jamaica to Saint John, New Brunswick, British North America.

== 8 September ==
List of shipwrecks: 8 September 1828
Ship	State	Description
Albion	United Kingdom	The ship was wrecked on Negro Point, Nova Scotia, British North America.

== 9 September ==
List of shipwrecks: 9 September 1828
Ship	State	Description
Duke of Sussex	United Kingdom	The steamboat suffered a boiler explosion and sank in the River Witham at Dogdyke, Lincolnshire.
Evander	United Kingdom	The ship foundered in the Atlantic Ocean. Her crew were rescued by Asia (United Kingdom).
Mary	United Kingdom	The ship was abandoned in the Atlantic Ocean. Her crew were rescued by Dalusia (United Kingdom). She was on a voyage from St. Andrew, New Brunswick, British North America to Barbados.

== 12 September ==
List of shipwrecks: 12 September 1828
Ship	State	Description
Adventure	United Kingdom	The sloop was driven ashore and wrecked at Eyemouth, Berwickshire. Her crew were rescued.
Molly	United Kingdom	The ship sprang a leak and was abandoned off Ailsa Craig with the loss of her captain. She was on a voyage from Alloa, Clackmannanshire to Troon, Ayrshire.
Thalia	United Kingdom	The ship was driven ashore and wrecked at Berck-sur-Mer, Pas-de-Calais, France. All on board were rescued. She was on a voyage from Jamaica to London.

== 13 September ==
List of shipwrecks: 13 September 1828
Ship	State	Description
Atalanta	United Kingdom	The ship capsized in a squall in the Kattegat. Her crew were rescued the next day by Maria (United Kingdom). Atalanta was on a voyage from Stettin to Bordeaux, Gironde, France.
Elizabeth	United Kingdom	The ship foundered off Whitby, Yorkshire with the loss of all on board.
Penelope	United Kingdom	The ship was driven ashore and wrecked in Runswick Bay. Her crew were rescued.
Supply	United Kingdom	The ship was wrecked on the Muggle Rock. She was on a voyage from Chepstow, Monmouthshire to Whitehaven, Cumberland.

== 14 September ==
List of shipwrecks: 14 September 1828
Ship	State	Description
Aid	United Kingdom	The ship was beached on the coast of Jutland and was wrecked. Her crew were rescued. She was on a voyage from South Shields, County Durham to Fredrikshavn, Denmark.

== 17 September ==
List of shipwrecks: 17 September 1828
Ship	State	Description
Braganza	United Kingdom	The ship was wrecked near Belize. She was on a voyage from Belize to Liverpool, Lancashire.

== 18 September ==
List of shipwrecks: 18 September 1828
Ship	State	Description
Columbine	United Kingdom	The steamship was wrecked at Ambleteuse, Pas-de-Calais, France. All on board, over 300 people, were rescued. She was on a voyage from London to Boulogne, Pas-de-Calais.

== 23 September ==
List of shipwrecks: 23 September 1828
Ship	State	Description
Princess Charlotte	United Kingdom	The ship was lost in the Bay of Bengal. She was on a voyage from Bengal, India to Mauritius.

== 26 September ==
List of shipwrecks: 26 September 1828
Ship	State	Description
Endeavour	United Kingdom	The ship departed from Arkhangelsk, Russia for Limerick. No further trace, presumed foundered with the loss of all hands.

== 28 September ==
List of shipwrecks: 28 September 1828
Ship	State	Description
Alexander	United Kingdom	The ship was driven ashore at Maryport, Cumberland.

== 29 September ==
List of shipwrecks: 29 September 1828
Ship	State	Description
Gallovidian	United Kingdom	The ship was wrecked near Mauritius.
John	United Kingdom	The sloop was driven ashore on Coquet Island, Northumberland and abandoned by her crew.
Mary	United Kingdom	The ship foundered off Lambay Island, County Dublin with the loss of all but four of her crew. She was on a voyage from Dundalk, County Louth to Southampton, Hampshire.

== 30 September ==
List of shipwrecks: 30 September 1828
Ship	State	Description
Ann	United Kingdom	The ship was driven ashore at Egmond aan Zee, North Holland, Netherlands. Her crew were rescued. She was on a voyage from Delfshaven, South Holland, Netherlands to Bergen, Norway.
Wilson	United Kingdom	The brig was driven ashore at Rattray Head, Aberdeenshire.

== Unknown date ==
List of shipwrecks: Unknown date in September 1828
Ship	State	Description
Caroline	Stettin	The ship was abandoned in the North Sea in early September. She was taken in to Sylt, Duchy of Schleswig on 7 September. Caroline was on a voyage from Hull, Yorkshire, United Kingdom to Stettin.
Crisis	United Kingdom	The ship sprang a leak and foundered. Some of her crew were rescued by Furstein Leignitz (Prussia). She was on a voyage from Danzig to London.
Earl of Annesley	United Kingdom	The ship was driven ashore at Douglas, Isle of Man before 13 September. She was on a voyage from Liverpool, Lancashire to Málaga, Spain.
Shamrock	United Kingdom	The ship was driven ashore at Douglas. She was on a voyage from Dublin to London.
Sun	United States	The steamship was destroyed by fire in the Atlantic Ocean 10 nautical miles (19 km) off New York. Her 32 crew survived.
Three Sisters	United Kingdom	The ship was wrecked in the St. Lawrence River before 8 September. She was on a voyage from the Clyde to Quebec City, Lower Canada, British North America.
