= Upper Witham IDB =

Coordinates: 53.238°N 0.57°W

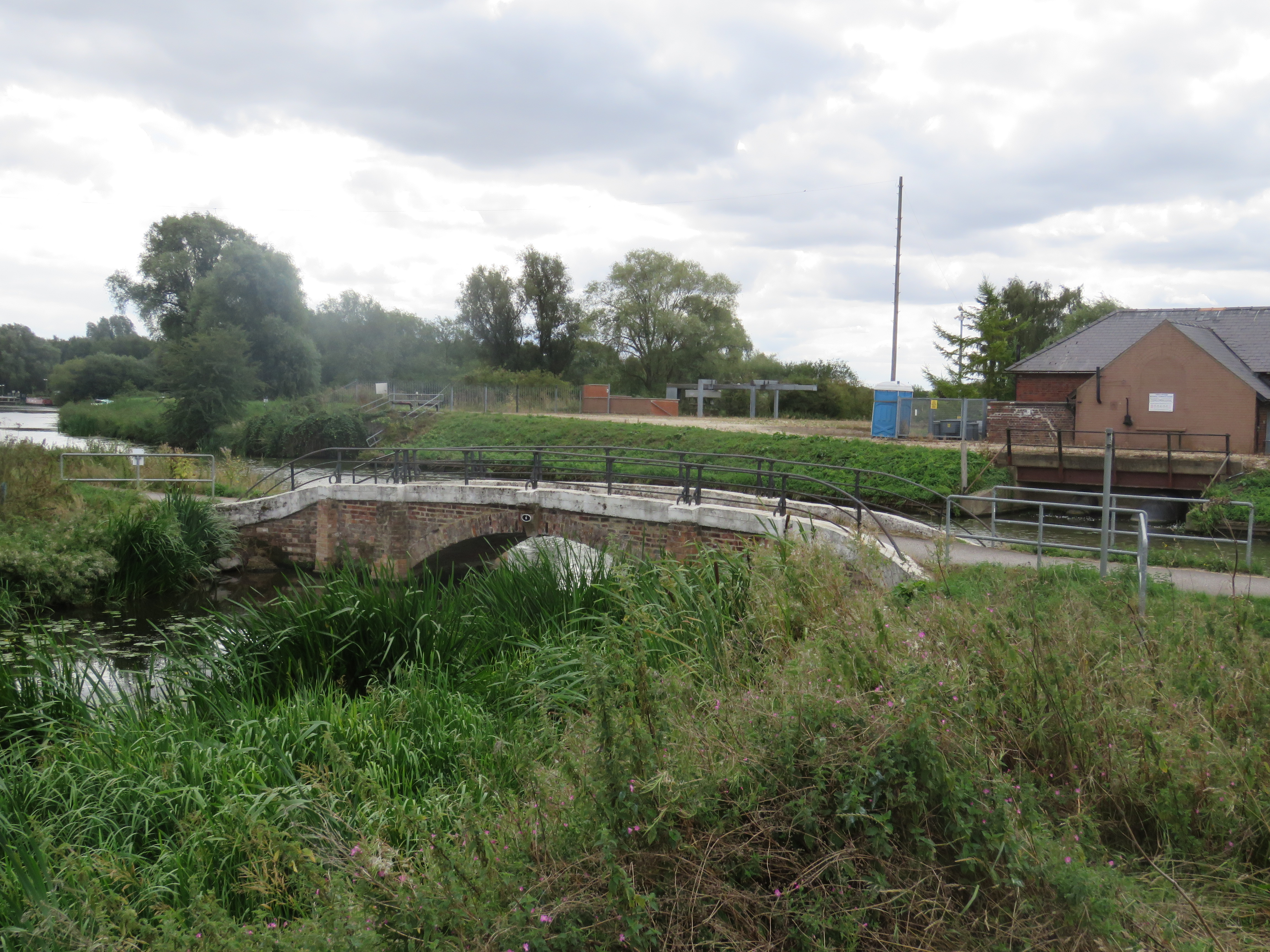
- The Catchwater Drain joins the Fossdyke Navigation opposite Pyewipe pumping station.

- Location within Lincolnshire
- OS grid reference: SK954719
- Shire county: Lincolnshire
- Region: East Midlands
- Country: England
- Sovereign state: United Kingdom

The Upper Witham IDB is an English Internal Drainage Board responsible for land drainage and the management of flood risk for an area to the west of the Lincolnshire city of Lincoln, broadly following the valleys of the upper River Witham, the River Till and the course of the Fossdyke Navigation.

== History ==
Land to the west and south of Lincoln was regularly inundated by flood events occurring on the River Trent. The low lands between Torksey and Lincoln would be covered, and flood water would pass through the Lincoln Gap to flow down the course of the modern lower Witham, to reach the sea at Boston, Friskney and Wainfleet Havens. Wheeler suggests that the normal course of the Witham in dryer weather was into Brayford Mere, a large lake to the west of Lincoln, and then westwards, roughly following the course of the Fossdyke Navigation to reach the Trent. To the east of Lincoln, the Langworth River flowed into another mere, located between Washingborough and Chapel Hill, and on to the sea near Boston. The Romans improved the watercourse from Lincoln to the Trent, to make it suitable for navigation, and cut a channel through the high ground in the centre of Lincoln. This continued to Short Ferry, and joined a tidal creek near Chapel Hill.

An Act of Parliament was obtained in 1670, for improvements to the navigation between Boston and the Trent. The preamble stated that there had been a good navigation along this route for centuries, but that both the Witham and the Fossdyke had become clogged with silt. This was the first attempt to put the river system on a commercial footing. The City of Lincoln was to appoint Commissioners, and were given powers to improve the channels or, where necessary, to cut new channels and to build banks, sluices and locks. The Act made provision for the collection of reasonable tolls, in order to fund the work. Another Act of Parliament was passed in 1752, which created the Witham General Commissioners, and divided the area to the east of Lincoln into six drainage districts, the Witham First, Second, Third, Fourth, Fifth and Sixth Districts. At the same time, the civil engineer John Smeaton recommended works to improve the drainage of the area to the west of Lincoln, but these were not carried out at the time.

Two major flood events took place soon afterwards. In 1770, water breached the Fossdyke embankment at Torksey, and land was flooded between the breach and Lincoln. A worse event happened in 1795, when the Trent breached the bank at Spalford. Around 20,000 acres (81 km^{2}) of land was flooded, some to a depth of 10 feet (3.0 m). When the water reached Lincoln, it was constrained by the High Street, which is between 12 and 15 feet (3.7 and 4.6 m) above the level of the surrounding land. Houses in the lower part of Saxilby were flooded, and families had to be moved to the upper town, with several of them living in the church until the floods subsided. The villages of Broxholme, Fenton, Hardwick, Hathow, Kettlethorpe, Thorney, and Wigsley were like islands, and could only be reached by boat, while parts of Torksey, Brampton, Fenton and Kettlethorpe were flooded. The flood waters remained for 3 weeks, and it took 80 loads of faggots and over 400 tons of earth to repair the breach in the river wall. Flood risk from the Trent was reduced following further major flooding events in 1824 and 1852, after which the five major 'gaps' along the Trent, at Spalford, Newton, Torksey Lock, Torksey and Marton, were extensively repaired by the Courts of Sewers for Newark and Lincoln.

In 1804 an Act of Parliament was obtained, to authorise the work proposed by Smeaton in 1752. The Act stated that it was For embanking, draining and improving certain Lands in the City of Lincoln and County thereof and in the parishes or townships of Boultham, Skellingthorpe, Saxilby, Broxholme, North Carlton, South Carlton, Burton and Hathow in the County of Lincoln and for inclosing Lands in the said parish of Skellingthorpe. This created two drainage districts, the Lincoln West (North District) Drainage Board, responsible for an area of 1,545 acres (625 ha) and the Lincoln West (South District) Drainage Board, responsible for 2,331 acres (943 ha). Again, there was a commercial aspect to the Act, as the drainage districts could raise an annual tax on the owners of lands which benefitted from the drainage and embankment works.

At that time, all discharge was by gravity, and the main outfall for both districts was through a tunnel under the River Witham at Coulson Road. From there it entered the Great Gowts Drain and the Syncil Dyke, to be discharged into the Witham below Lincoln. The Act enabled the North District to build a cast iron tunnel under the Fossdyke Navigation and a new drain to convey the water to the Main Drain of the South District. Additionally, they could build a catchwater drain along the edge of the higher ground to the east, which would discharge into the Fossdyke. The South District could also build a catchwater drain, running along the edge of higher ground to the south, and discharging into the Witham. When the works were completed, the drainage system was much as it is today.

=== Organisation ===
By the mid-1920s, the government realised that the existing laws concerning land drainage were in disarray, with much of it still depending on Henry VIII's Statue of Sewers of 1531. In particular, it seemed unfair that lowland communities bore all the costs of ensuring that water from upland regions got to the sea without flooding the land, and the upland communities paid nothing. A Royal Commission was set up in 1927, to consider the problem, and summarised their findings in two main proposals. The first was that there should be an overall authority in each catchment area, with responsibility for the main rivers and their banks, and a requirement that they work closely with drainage authorities. The second was that drainage rates should be levied over a much wider area, than just those who benefitted directly from the work of the drainage authorities. These ideas were enshrined in the Land Drainage Act 1930.

The Witham and Steeping Rivers Catchment Board was set up under the Act, and they constituted the Upper Witham Internal Drainage Board (IDB) by an order dated 14 September 1932, which would take effect from 1 April 1933. The Lincolnshire and Nottinghamshire Commissioners of Sewers were wound up, with their powers passing to the catchment board or drainage board as appropriate, and the North District and South District Drainage Boards were also abolished. Subsequently, the catchment board became part of the Lincolnshire River Board under the River Boards Act 1948, then the Lincolnshire River Authority under the Water Resources Act 1963, the Anglian Water Authority under the Water Act 1973, the National Rivers Authority under the Water Act 1989 and finally the Environment Agency under the Environment Act 1995.

The Upper Witham IDB operates independently from the Witham First District IDB, the Witham Third District IDB, and the North East Lindsey IDB in that they have their own budgets, board, plant and machinery, but much of the administration is shared. The four IDBs have a common Chief Executive and Director of Operations, and a number of financial and administrative functions are also shared. The board consists of members who are elected and those who are appointed by the local authorities who pay drainage levies to the board. In the case of Upper Witham IDB, the number of appointed members exceeds the number of elected member.

=== Pumping stations ===
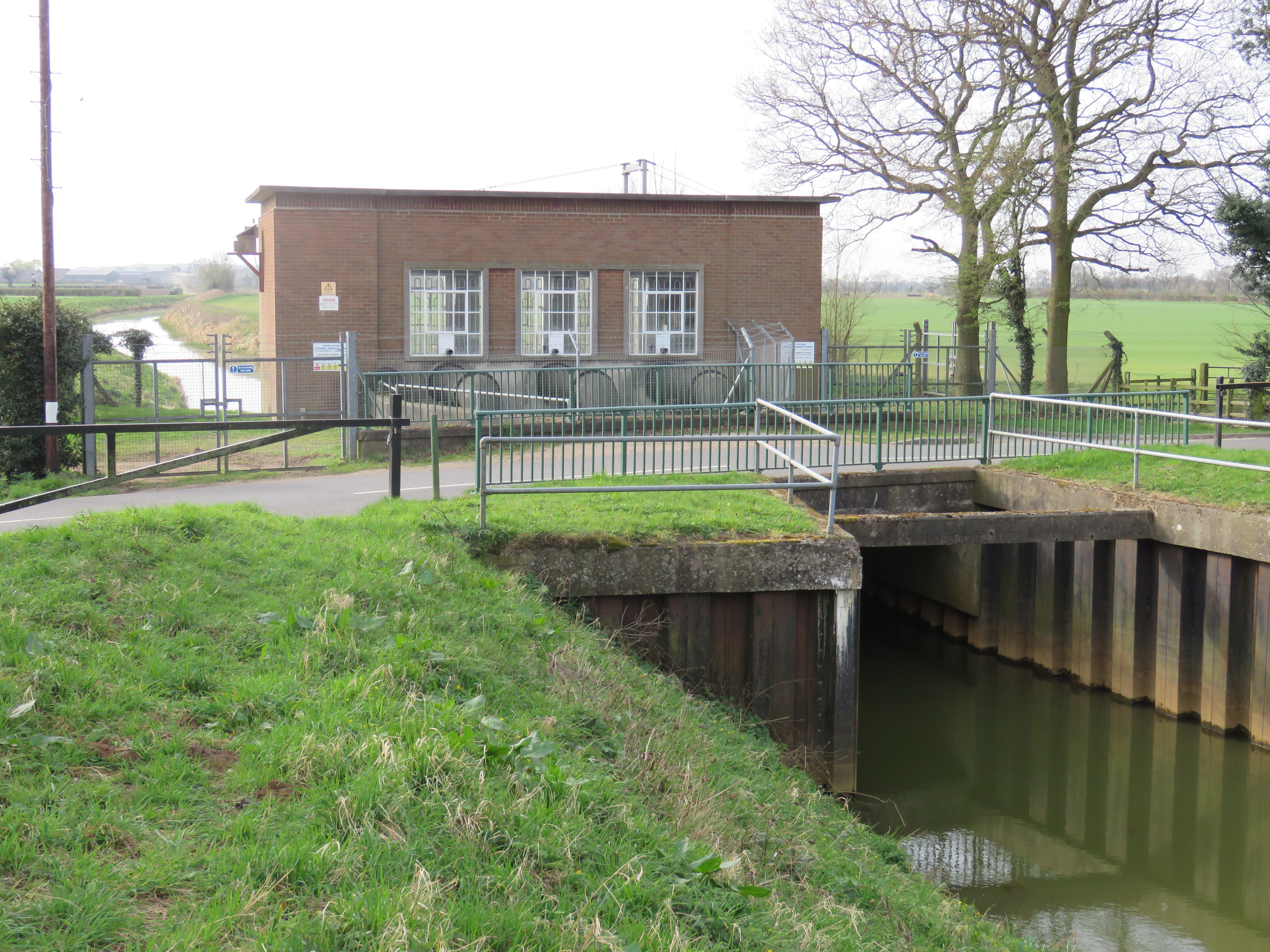
Oxpasture pumping station was built by the Upper Witham IDB in 1961

Before the advent of the Upper Witham IDB, most of the drainage was by gravity, although there were a few small areas where pumps were used. These were at Boultham, Skellingthorpe, Saxilby and Broxholme, and the pumps were operated by the Church Commissioners or by private individuals. For the rest of the region, the outfalls into the main rivers were controlled by sluice doors, some automatically operated, but many still hand operated. Under flood conditions, levels in the main drains rose rapidly, and internal pumps had to be stopped at the time when they were needed most.

At Pyewipe, there was a steam pumping station, but no further information about it has been found. A new pumping station on the south bank of the Fossdyke was built in 1936, and initially contained two single-cylinder Ruston diesel engines, each directly connected to a 27-inch (69 cm) Gwynnes pump. This was supplemented by a third engine in 1940, a twin-cylinder Ruston with a 30-inch (76 cm) pump. The number of pumping stations has steadily increased, and Upper Witham IDB had 15 operational stations in 2011. The board are responsible for the drainage of an area of 77.2 square miles (200 km^{2}), and they maintain 198 miles (319 km) of drains within that area.

== See also ==
- Witham Navigable Drains
- Witham First District IDB
- Witham Third District IDB

== Bibliography ==
- Dobson, Alban; Hull, Hubert (1931). The Land Drainage Act 1930. Oxford University Press.
- Hinde, K. S. G. (2006). Fenland Pumping Engines. Landmark Publishing Ltd. ISBN 1-84306-188-0.
- IDB (2013). "History". Upper Witham IDB. Archived from the original on 17 July 2014.
- IDB map. "Lincolnshire Drainage Boards". Witham First District IDB. Archived from the original on 14 March 2012.
- Wheeler, William Henry; Batty, Leonard Charles (1896). A History of the Fens of South Lincolnshire. British Library Historical Print Collections. ISBN 978-1-241-32839-9.
