= Bedford Group of Drainage Boards =

Group of authorities in England

The Bedford Group of Drainage Boards is a group of three internal drainage boards which are situated in the upper reaches of the River Great Ouse in England. The group comprises:

- Alconbury and Ellington Internal Drainage Board
- Bedfordshire and River Ivel Internal Drainage Board
- Buckingham and River Ouzel Internal Drainage Board
