= Association of Drainage Authorities =

British membership body

- Abbreviation: ADA
- Formation: 1937; 89 years ago
- Type: Membership organisation
- Headquarters: Stoneleigh Park, Warwickshire
- Region served: United Kingdom
- Members: Internal drainage boards, Environment Agency regional flood defence committees, Northern Ireland Rivers Agency, local authorities, consultants, contractors and suppliers
- Key people: President: Henry Cator; Chairman: Robert Caudwell; CEO: Innes Thomson
- Affiliations: EUWMA
- Website: www.ada.org.uk

The Association of Drainage Authorities (ADA) is a membership body for internal drainage boards and other stakeholders in water level management in the United Kingdom.

ADA obtains and disseminates information on matters of importance and interest to members, and provides assistance on technical and administrative problems. It organises exhibitions and demonstrations, maintains a website and publishes the quarterly ADA Gazette. A new national flood risk management assets database system will greatly facilitate data transfer.

== Membership ==
The Association's members are

- Internal drainage boards (IDBs)
- Environment Agency regional flood defence committees (RFDCs)
- Northern Ireland Rivers Agency

Associate members of ADA include local authorities, consultants, contractors and suppliers.

== Activities ==
The main activities of ADA involve a wide range of work for and on behalf of its members including facilitating the exchange of ideas and promoting discussions to solving common problems and/or introduction of new approaches to members' work.

ADA responds to consultations from the Government, either on behalf of members or by facilitating individual member responses. It represents the interests of Drainage Authorities and other members nationally and locally, for example in relation to Bills in Parliament, other legislative measures, and local public inquiries. ADA acts collaboratively with other appropriate bodies or institutions to pursue the Association's objectives including linking to Europe through ADA's membership of EUWMA, (European Union of Water Management Associations).

== Catchment 08 Exhibition ==
Catchment 08 on Wednesday 17th and Thursday 18 September 2008 was the first in a new biennial series of Catchment exhibitions set up by ADA for the flood management industry. It was held at the East of England Showground, Peterborough.

ADA has been regularly organising exhibitions of supplies and machinery used by the flood risk management industry since the 1970s when the first ADA Demonstration was held on the bank of the Vernatt’s Drain near Spalding in Lincolnshire.

== Consultations ==
=== IDB review ===
A review of internal drainage boards (IDBs) was announced in June 2005 by Defra. ADA has been involved throughout the review process representing its IDB members. It is one of four organisations which have a permanent position on the IDB Review Project Board which drew together a detailed implementation plan for IDBs. As part of the process ADA produced a response to Defra's sub-catchment plans for IDBs entitled Moving Forwards with Defra's 'Rationale for Proposed Sub-catchment Internal Drainage Boards'

=== Summer floods 2007 ===
The widespread flooding across the United Kingdom in June and July 2007 prompted a number of inquiries by several organisations into government policy on flood risk management both at a planning stage and during the event. ADA has assisted in a number of these including the Pitt Review chaired by Sir Michael Pitt, the Efra Flooding Report and Audit Commission report 'Staying Afloat'. ADA responded to these consultations through stakeholder meetings, formal oral evidence sessions and written responses after seeking the views of its members. ADA's response included a call for an enhanced and expanded role for internal drainage boards, increased watercourse maintenance and the provision of more flood risk management engineers.

=== Surface water drainage ===
As part of Defra's Water Strategy, Future Water published in 2008, key policy proposals were set out in a supplementary consultation entitled Improving Surface Water Drainage. ADA interacted with the consultation process through stakeholder workshop events and a written response.

== Guidance ==
In October 2008 ADA published in conjunction with Natural England The Drainage Channel Biodiversity Manual to assistance operating authorities engaged in the complex management of our lowland drainage systems for water level management and wildlife.

Previously ADA has published other collaborative works with Natural England including national guidance for internal drainage boards on mitigation measures for water voles.

ADA hosts an annual Local Authorities Seminar aimed to update and guide local authorities with their responsibilities to water level management.

As part of its role in the IDB Review, ADA produced a document 'Moving Forwards with Defra's Rationale for Proposed Sub-catchment Internal Drainage Boards' in April 2008. This document considered Defra's proposed Sub-catchment Maps, the Minister of State for the Environment's Letter and the Defra Rationale for Proposed Sub-catchment Internal Drainage Boards and highlighted the issues for discussions between IDBs.

== Technical assistance ==
ADA has assisted internal drainage boards by developing a national flood risk management assets database system. Once complete the system will create a register of watercourses, pumping stations, sluices within IDB drainage districts. The system has had to take into account specific IDB requirements whilst ensuring a format that will enable ease of data transfer to future systems and user defined updates. The system is currently in the initial data gathering phase and is anticipated to go live during July 2008.
