= Witham Third District IDB =

Coordinates: 53.21°N 0.34°W

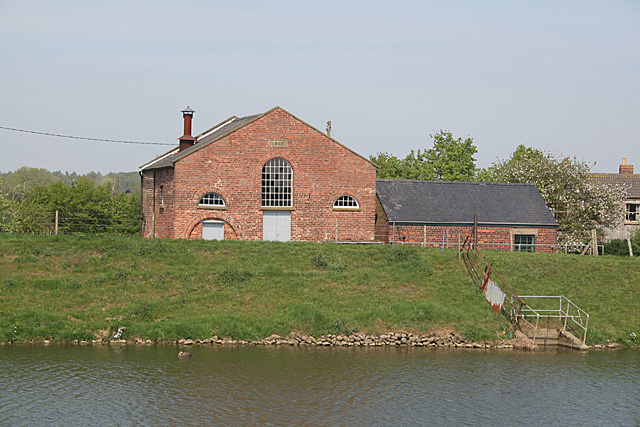
- Dogdyke pumping station still houses its original steam pumping engine of 1858 which has been restored to working order. The building is a Scheduled Monument.

- Location within Lincolnshire
- OS grid reference: TF110694
- Shire county: Lincolnshire
- Region: East Midlands
- Country: England
- Sovereign state: United Kingdom

Witham Third District IDB is an English internal drainage board set up under the terms of the Land Drainage Act 1930. The Board inherited the responsibilities of the Witham General Drainage Commissioners, who were first constituted by an act of Parliament of 1762. They manage the land drainage of an area to the north and east of the River Witham, between Lincoln and Dogdyke, which includes the valley of the River Bain to above Hemingby, and the valleys of Barlings Eau and most of its tributaries, to the north east of Lincoln.

Most of the parishes were enclosed in the late 1700s, by separate acts of Parliament, and steam-powered drainage was introduced from the 1830s. Steam engines were gradually replaced by oil and diesel engines, and most have since been superseded by electric pumps. The Witham Third District IDB maintains seventeen pumping stations and 140 miles (230 km) of drainage channels.

== Organisation ==
The River Witham passes through low-lying land in Lincolnshire, which is susceptible to flooding. In 1762, an Act of Parliament was passed, which created the Witham General Drainage Commissioners, and divided the area into six districts, each with responsibility for land drainage. These were called the Witham First, Second, Third, Fourth, Fifth and Sixth Districts. The Third District covered an area of 4,621 acres (1,870 ha), bounded on the south and west by the river, and including Stainfield and Tattershall, with the higher ground to the north and east forming the other boundary.

There was initially one Commissioner for each of the parishes or places of the district, and these District Commissioners then elected five General Commissioners to represent them on the Witham General Drainage Commission. This body consisted of 31 Commissioners, with the remaining 26 being elected by the five other Drainage Districts created by the original Act.

The Land Drainage Act 1930 made provision for the creation of internal drainage boards. The Witham Third District IDB was formally constituted on 1 November 1934, and brought together the Witham Third District Commissioners, the River Bain Drainage Board, the Bardney Drainage Board, the Greetwell District Drainage Commissioners, and the Kirkstead Drainage Board. A committee of 15 was appointed by a government minister, and the administrative offices were in Mint Street, Lincoln. Two clerks, an engineer and a finance officer were soon appointed, and a finance committee and works committee were formed. A third committee looked at how resources could be shared with the Witham First District IDB, but this was short-lived.

When the IDB took over from the Drainage Commissioners, there were three main pumping engines, at Short Ferry, Stixwould and Dogdyke. The pumping station attendants lived isolated lives, ensuring that the coal-fired engines were available for service at any time of the day or night. These were replaced by diesel engines, and a scheme to replace the large stations with a number of smaller electric pumping stations was started in the 1950s. The large number of directly employed men and the use of contractors for new schemes has been replaced by a small team of multi-skilled workers who maintain the watercourses using a variety of machinery. The controlling Board is made up of 31 members, seven appointed by the City of Lincoln, three by West Lindsey District Council and four by East Lindsey District Council. 15 are elected by the ratepayers of the district, and the final two are joint appointments.

== Development ==
Prior to the eighteenth century, land on both sides of the River Witham below Lincoln was open common land. During the summer months, it was possible to graze animals on it, but even then, it was subject to regular flooding. During the winter months, it was generally under water for long periods, and could not be used at all. Although work had been carried out to straighten the channel of the river, and constructing the Grand Sluice to the north of Boston, neither measure was sufficient to make the land suitable for agriculture. In order to achieve this, it would be necessary to embank the land, and to provide means of raising the water into the main rivers. Such an action would also require the common rights of the local people to be removed. The bodies created by the 1762 Act were responsible for all interior works within their area, and the maintenance of drains and pumping engines, for which they had powers to change rates.

Although the Third District Commissioners were established by the Act, in practice smaller areas within the District, known as Drainage Levels, obtained their own Acts of Parliament to authorise specific works. Thus there were Drainage Levels for Greetwell; Stainfield, Barlings and Fiskerton; Bardney, Southrey and Stixwold; and Tattershall. The Greetwell Drainage District was established by an Act obtained in 1861. Five Commissioners managed the Level, and to be a Commissioner, either he or his wife had to own at least 20 acres (8.1 ha) within the District, or be an occupier of at least 40 acres (16 ha). Because of the increased volumes of water which would be pumped into the Witham, the Commissioners had to pay £5 per year to the Great Northern Railway Company (GNR). The GNR were the owners of the Witham Navigation, and the money was for maintenance of the banks of the river. The Greetwell Level covered an area of around 1,500 acres (610 ha), but the amount of water that had to be managed was disproportionate, as water from the higher ground to the north found its way into the drains, and the banks of the Witham were porous, resulting in significant seepage out of the river and into the drains.

Responsibility for the North Delph, a catchwater drain running parallel to the river for 9 miles (14 km) from Lincoln to Horsley Deeps, passed from the GNR to the Commissioners. Before the Act, the land had been drained by a wind pump, but the Commissioners built a steam pumping station where the South Delph and the old course of the River Witham met. It was rated at 30 hp (22 kW) and drove a scoop wheel which was 31 feet (9.4 m) in diameter. The cost of the project was £949. A second pumping station, with a 50 hp (37 kW) steam engines driving two 21-inch (53 cm) centrifugal pumps was erected in 1893 at a cost of £644. The first engine was made by Jarvis and Horsfield of Leeds, while the second was supplied by Robey and Company. Both lasted until 1935, when they were replaced by two Ruston & Hornsby twin-cylinder engines, connected to 30-inch (76 cm) pumps manufactured by Gwynnes. Although superseded by an Allen-Gwynnes 27-inch (69 cm) pump and electric motor in 1977, the diesel engines were retained as a standby system.

There was also a 16 hp (12 kW) steam engine located near Barlings Lock, which pumped water into the old course of the Witham near Shorts Ferry, but this was privately financed by landowners. The engine was rated at 16 hp (12 kW) and was installed some time before 1881. It was replaced by a 30 hp (22 kW) steam engine driving an 18-inch (46 cm) Gwynnes pump in 1896. The plant was demolished between 1943 and 1953, and the district has been drained by an Allen-Gwynnes 20-inch (51 cm) electric pump since 1977.

Drainage of the Bardney District, which consisted of the villages of Bardney, Bucknall, Edlington, Horsington, Southrey, Stixwould, Tupholme and Thimbleby, was authorised by an Act obtained in 1843. The district covered an area of 2,720 acres (11.0 km^{2}), and a drainage engine was erected in 1846. It consisted of a low pressure condensing beam engine, driving a 28-foot (8.5 m) scoop wheel. Drainage rates were collected from 2,610 acres (10.6 km^{2}), but again, water entered the district from the higher ground to the north, and so the engine drained almost twice that area. The beam engine and scoop wheel were replaced by a Robey tandem compound steam engine and a vertical spindle pump in 1913. The station was further upgraded in 1936, when two Ruston & Hornsby oil engines with Gwynnes pumps were installed. Electric pumps manufactured by Allen-Gwynnes were installed around 1977, but the oil engines were retained as a back-up system.

Kirkstead was a smaller district, with an engine which drained some 700 acres (2.8 km^{2}). It was unusual, in that there was a flour mill between the engine and the scoop wheel, and the engine was used to power that when drainage was not necessary. The engine was scrapped some time before 1936. In 1948, an 18-inch (46 cm) axial-flow Gwynnes pump was installed, which was driven by a 37.5 hp (28.0 kW) induction motor. It was controlled automatically.

The Tattershall District was the earliest to obtain an Act of Parliament, which it did in 1796. After enclosure, it was drained by a wind engine, but this was replaced by a steam engine with a 24-foot (7.3 m) scoop wheel in 1855. The engine was a 16 hp (12 kW) beam engine, manufactured by Bradley & Craven Ltd of Wakefield. Steam was generated by a Cornish boiler, which was replaced by a Foster boiler in 1909. The engine house originally had a 100-foot (30 m) chimney, but this was struck by lightning in 1922, after which it was shortened. It was demolished in 1941, soon after a new pumping station was built, housing a Ruston diesel engine and a 22-inch (56 cm) Gwynnes pump. This has been superseded by an electric pumping station, but is still maintained by the Third District as a backup. The steam and diesel engines are cared for by the Dogdyke Pumping Station Preservation Trust, and the station is opened to the public several times a year, when the engines are operational. The boiler was replaced by a Clayton cross-tube vertical boiler in 1976, and replaced again in 2001. The buildings are Grade II listed and scheduled ancient monuments.

== See also ==
Witham Navigable Drains
Witham First District IDB
Upper Witham IDB

== Bibliography ==
- First IDB (2003). "History". Witham First District IDB. Archived from the original on 26 November 2020.
- Hinde, K. S. G. (2006). Fenland Pumping Engines. Landmark Publishing Ltd. ISBN 1-84306-188-0.
- IDB (2013). "History". Witham Third District IDB. Archived from the original on 24 July 2013.
- IDB map. "Lincolnshire Drainage Boards". Witham First District IDB. Archived from the original on 14 March 2012.
- Wheeler, William Henry; Batty, Leonard Charles (1896). A History of the Fens of South Lincolnshire. British Library Historical Print Collections. ISBN 978-1-241-32839-9.
