= Anton's Gowt =

Hamlet in the East Lindsey district of Lincolnshire, England

Coordinates: 53.00926°N 0.06336°W

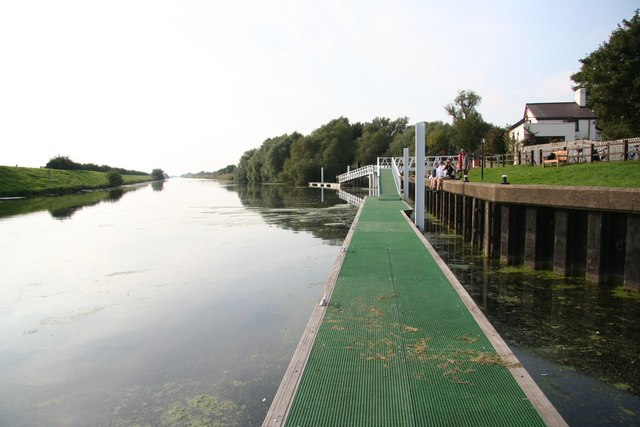
- Anton's Gowt

- Location within Lincolnshire
- OS grid reference: TF300475
  - London: 100 mi (160 km) S
- Civil parish: Langriville
- District: East Lindsey
- Shire county: Lincolnshire
- Region: East Midlands
- Country: England
- Sovereign state: United Kingdom
- Post town: Boston
- Postcode district: PE22
- Dialling code: 01205
- Police: Lincolnshire
- Fire: Lincolnshire
- Ambulance: East Midlands
- UK Parliament: Boston and Skegness

Anton's Gowt is a hamlet in the East Lindsey district of Lincolnshire, England. It is situated approximately 2 miles (3 km) north-west from the market town and port of Boston. It is the most southerly village within the East Lindsey district.

== History ==
Anton's Gowt is in an area once known as Wildmore Fen.

It's believed that the lock, and from it the hamlet, were named after Sir Anthony Thomas, one of a group of people who helped drain the Witham Fens from 1631 onwards. The word 'Gowt' is on old term for "A water-pipe under the ground. A sewer. A flood-gate, through which the marsh-water runs from the reens into the sea."

A Primitive Methodist chapel was built by the Doughty family in 1852, but is no longer in evidence. Its centenary was held in June 1952, in the carpenter's shop of the Burn family, and the service was conducted by a Mr H. Doughty of Lincoln who was 95 years old. The chapel closed in 1964, when it still had 18 Sunday school scholars.

A loop line of the Great Northern Railway (from Peterborough to Bawtry) once ran along the north bank of the River Witham, passing by Anton's Gowt Lock. Today the route of the line is a cycle path to Boston.

== Community ==
Anton's Gowt is at the junction of the River Witham and the Frith Bank Drain (part of the Witham Navigable Drains) – Anton's Gowt Lock provides access between these two waterways.

The hamlet falls under Langriville civil parish, part of Frithville Ward of East Lindsey District Council.

A cycle path along the River Witham to Boston passes Anton's Gowt Lock. The hamlet contains a public house, a pet food supplier, dog kennels, and an auto salvage firm.
