= European Union of Water Management Associations =

European Union of Water Management Associations (EUWMA) members are (umbrella) organizations in the EU member states representing organizations based on public law responsible for regional and local water management (flood protection, land drainage, water level management, irrigation) such as internal drainage boards or Waterschappen.

At present, organizations from Belgium, France, Germany, Hungary, Italy, the Netherlands, Spain and United Kingdom are members of EUWMA.

EUWMA represents over 8.600 individual organizations, covering over 50 mln. ha.

== Objectives ==
- To increase cooperation in the field of water management between the European Water Management Associations so as to provide relevant information, views, position papers, and policy documents to National Governments, the European Commission, the European Parliament and other relevant institutions.
- To exchange knowledge, experiences and views between the members.

== Constituent organisations ==
- Association of Drainage Authorities (ADA) - United Kingdom
- Association des Wateringues Wallonnes (AWW) - Belgium
- Associazione Nationale Bonifiche, Irrigazione e Miglioramenti Fondiari (ANBI) - Italy
- Federación nacional de comunidades de regantes de España (FENACORE) - Spain
- ASAdeFrance : With more than 1,000 members, ASA de FRANCE is the leading network bringing together Water and Environment Management Organizations ruled by public laws, known as "ASA"
- Forum des Marais Atlantiques - France
- Institution Interdépartementale Nord-Pas-de-Calais Pour la réalisation des ouvrages généraux d'évacuation des * crues de la région des Wateringues - France
- Társulati Informatikai Rendszer (TIR) - Hungary
- Unie van Waterschappen (UVW) - The Netherlands
- Vereniging van Vlaamse Polders en Wateringen (VVPW) - Belgium
- Deutscher Bund der verbandlichen Wasserwirtschaft (DBVW) - Germany

== See also ==
- International trade and water
