= Witham First District IDB =

Internal drainage board in Lincolnshire, England

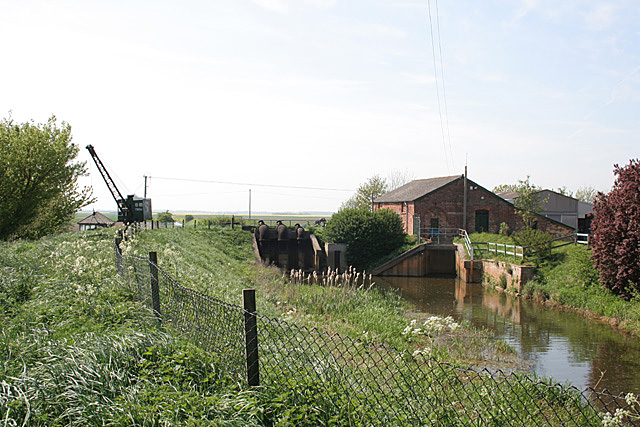
- Timberland pumping station at Thorpe Tilney Dales, which was superseded by electric pumps, and is open to the public.

- Location within Lincolnshire
- OS grid reference: TF187560
- Shire county: Lincolnshire
- Region: East Midlands
- Country: England
- Sovereign state: United Kingdom

Witham First District IDB is an English internal drainage board which was set up under the terms of the Land Drainage Act 1930. The Board inherited the responsibilities of the Witham General Drainage Commissioners, who were first constituted by an Act of Parliament of 1762. They manage the land drainage of an area to the west of the River Witham, between Lincoln and Dogdyke, which includes the valley of the River Slea to above Sleaford.

The district is divided into a number of compartments, as it is intersected by embanked rivers which cross the area, carrying water from the Car Dyke, which acts as a catchwater drain at the western boundary, to the Witham on its eastern edge. Most of the parishes were enclosed in the late 1700s, by separate Acts of Parliament, and steam-powered drainage was introduced from the 1830s. Steam engines were gradually replaced by oil and diesel engines, and most have since been superseded by electric pumps. The Witham First District IDB maintains thirteen pumping stations and 165 miles (266 km) of drainage channels.

== Organisation ==
The River Witham passes through low-lying land in Lincolnshire, which is susceptible to flooding. In 1762, an act of Parliament (2 Geo iii, c.32, 1762) was passed, which created the Witham General Drainage Commissioners, and divided the area into six districts, each with responsibility for land drainage. These were called the Witham First, Second, Third, Fourth, Fifth and Sixth Districts. The First District covered an area of 24,916 acres (10,083 ha), bounded on the north and east by the river, and on the south and west by the Car Dyke, an ancient navigation channel. The Fifth District covered a much smaller area of 5,176 acres (2,095 ha) between Billinghay Skirth and Kyme Eau, the lower part of the River Slea. It became part of the First District in 1953.

There were initially 23 commissioners for the district, one elected by each of the eighteen parishes which formed the First District, and another five from parishes in the Fifth District. Each district also elected some of the 31 General Drainage Commissioners. Seven came from the First District and another two from the Fifth District. The remainder came from the other four similar bodies created by the original Act.

The Land Drainage Act 1930 made provision for the creation of internal drainage boards. The Witham and Steepings Catchment Board, who were responsible for the rivers at the time, proposed the creation of the Witham First District IDB, which took effect from 8 January 1934. In 1951, the board was restructured to include six extra members, when the Witham Fifth District IBD was abolished, and was effectively amalgamated with the First District. Its area of responsibility was extended in 1968, when parts of fourteen parishes and the Urban District of Sleaford came under its jurisdiction, and the board was again restructured on 7 July 1993, to include representatives from local councils, as required by the Land Drainage Act 1991.

== Landscape ==
The district is effectively broken up into compartments by a number of rivers, acting as highland carriers, whose water level is normally above that of the surrounding land, but flooding is prevented by flood banks. The main river is the Witham, running broadly north to south through the district, but there is also the Car Dyke, which runs parallel to the Witham and further to the west, acting as a catchwater drain for water which would otherwise flow into the low-lying region. Between them, running broadly west to east, are seven other channels. Beginning in the north, below Lincoln, and working south towards Boston, these are Sandhill Beck, Branston Delph, Nocton Delph, Metheringham Delph, Timberland Delph, Billinghay Skirth, and Kyme Eau, which is another name for the lower part of the River Slea. The water level of most of these is normally the same as that of the Witham, but they are fitted with pointed doors where they meet, which are designed to close by gravity if water levels in the Witham rise significantly. They are all classified as main rivers, and are therefore managed by the Environment Agency. The total length of rivers passing through the district or adjacent to it is 94 miles (151 km), and they are restrained by 125 miles (201 km) of banks.

The area managed by the First District IDB lies to the east of the Lincoln Edge, a limestone escarpment which is a prominent feature of Lincolnshire. Several small streams are fed by springs on its dip slope, and the Car Dyke intercepts these. It connects with the heads of the Delphs, discharging water from the streams into them by gravity. At Billinghay Skirth, a small sluice connects the two waterways. The district covers an area of 60.82 square miles (157.5 km^{2}), of which all but 1.03 square miles (2.7 km^{2}) is agricultural land. The catchment for the district includes an additional 2.88 square miles (7.5 km^{2}). Within the district, 11.8 acres (4.8 ha) are a designated Site of Special Scientific Interest, and the 74 acres (30 ha) of Metheringham Delph are a nature reserve.

== Development ==
Before the eighteenth century, the district was open common land, where those living in adjoining parishes had grazing rights. The fens were used as summer pasture, as they were frequently flooded for most of the winter period. Efforts to improve the Witham by straightening the channel, making it deeper, and constructing the Grand Sluice to the north of Boston did not prevent flooding. Following the passing of the 1762 Act, the structure was in place to address these issues. The commissioners had responsibility for the district, but also powers to collect rates, to ensure that the drainage works could be built and maintained.

For administrative purposes, the district was divided up into a number of sub-districts, based on parish boundaries and enclosure acts. A series of Acts of Parliament, passed between 1779 and 1840 authorised improvements to these sub-districts, and initial attempts to drain the land used wind-pumps. The work had significant effects on land values. Arthur Young, writing in 1799, noted that land which was previously let at one shilling and sixpence (7.5p) per acre (0.4 ha), was now valued at between eleven shillings (55p) and seventeen shillings (85p) per acre. A Commissioner called Mr. Parkinson estimated that the rental value of 43,407 acres (17,566 ha) had risen from £5,982 to £42,375. This was "effected by a moderate embankment and the erection of windmills for throwing out the superfluous water."

The science of Fen drainage was not well understood when the first enclosure acts were passed, and it was thought that flooding might be worse if the embankments were placed too close to the river. Consequently, the Dales Head Dyke was constructed, about 1 mile (1.6 km) to the west of the Witham, and the land between it and the river was used as washland, and was flooded for up to nine months each year. By 1797, the process was better understood, and an Act of Parliament authorised the reclaiming of 2,800 acres (1,100 ha) of washland, by moving the banks much closer to the river, and extending the banks at the sides of several fens to join the repositioned flood bank. A drainage engine was to be moved from Blankney Fen to Martin Fen, and the documents were to be stored in a chest in Timberland Church, where they could be viewed on payment of one shilling (5p).

=== Pumping engines ===
By the 1840s, several steam-powered pumping stations had been built, to pump water from the drains into the river more efficiently. Early installations, such as that at Dunston and Metheringham, consisted of a beam engine driving a scoop wheel. By 1913, this had been replaced by a steam engine driving a pump made by Smithdale, which was itself replaced by a 100 hp (75 kW) oil engine and a Gwynnes Limited pump between 1933 and 1943. Two electric motors with 24-inch (61 cm) Gwynnes pumps replaced them in 1952, located at a different site, and in 1990, a submersible electric pump was installed at a third site.

An Act to enclose the fen land in the parish of Branston was obtained in 1765, and another for the parish of Potterhanworth in 1774. This also gave the Commissioners powers to build banks, engines and sluices. A third Act was obtained in 1789, which authorised the embanking of 5,850 acres (2,370 ha) in Nocton, Potterhanworth and Branston. It included provision for enlarging the Car Dyke, and raising its eastern bank. In 1812, the Witham was straightened by cutting the South Delph, and the part of Branston parish which was now on the east bank of the Witham became known as Branston Island. Drainage was by a wind engine, but this was not adequate for the job, and in 1832 a further Act was obtained to allow a steam engine to be used. The Witham Commissioners thought that the extra volume of water and the speed with which it would be pumped would damage the river banks, and sought an injunction to prevent the use of steam power. This was refused, and a 40 hp (30 kW) engine was installed. Much of the fen was flooded in 1862, when a 156-foot (48 m) section of the South Delph flood bank failed. The Great Northern Railway Company, who owned the Witham at this time, argued that although the river was their responsibility, the bank was not, as it was not specifically mentioned in the 1812 Act. However, Lincoln Assizes decided differently, and awarded damages to those affected by the flood. The engine was replaced by a Marshall steam engine and 36-inch (91 cm) Gwynnes pump sometime in the early twentieth century, which was itself replaced by a Ruston oil engine in 1940. An Allen-Gwynnes electric motor driving a 24-inch (61 cm) axial flow pump was installed in 1956.

The Timberland and Thorpe fens cover an area of 2,850 acres (11.5 km^{2}) and were enclosed in 1785. An Act of Parliament obtained in 1839 authorised drainage, and the first Timberland pumping station was constructed in that year. A 26.5-foot (8.1 m) scoop wheel was driven by a 30 hp (22 kW) beam engine, discharging water into the Witham. A high-pressure condensing beam engine replaced it in 1881, which was coupled to a 48-inch (120 cm) centrifugal pump. Further upgrades included a Foster tandem horizontal steam engine in 1924 and a Ruston diesel engine in 1938. When the equipment was replaced by electric pumps in 1976, the diesel engine and Gwynnes pump were retained, and are open to the public during the summer.

Billinghay South Fen was enclosed in 1777, and covered 4,526 acres (18.32 km^{2}). The first beam engine, which was manufactured by Green Atkinson, and its scoop wheel, lasted from 1841 until 1935. It was then replaced by two diesel engines with Gwynnes pumps. The building was bombed by enemy aircraft in 1941, during the Second World War, and five members of the Richardson family were killed. Richardson was the engine driver at the time. After the incident many redundant chimneys were demolished, as they were prominent targets for enemy aircraft. By 1977 pumping was performed by two electric-powered 30-inch (76 cm) pumps manufactured by Allen-Gwynnes.

== Pumping stations ==
The table shows the locations of the IDB pumping stations, with the number of pumps in 2008, and the maximum pumped flow in megalitres per day (Mld) (1 Mld is 0.233 million gallons per day).

Point	Coordinates (Links to map resources)	OS Grid Ref	Notes
Sandhill Beck PS	53.2293°N 0.4395°W	TF042713	1 pump (73 Mld)
Heighington PS	53.2299°N 0.3967°W	TF071715	2 pumps (96 Mld)
Branston PS	53.2178°N 0.3546°W	TF099702	2 pumps (102 Mld)
Nocton PS	53.1926°N 0.3265°W	TF119674	2 pumps (202 Mld)
Metheringham PS	53.1805°N 0.2948°W	TF140661	2 pumps (181 Mld)
Blankney PS	53.1571°N 0.2583°W	TF165636	2 pumps (229 Mld)
Timberland PS	53.1091°N 0.2245°W	TF189583	3 pumps (253 Mld)
Billinghay PS	53.0887°N 0.2418°W	TF178560	1 pump (80 Mld)
Chapel Hill PS	53.0702°N 0.2097°W	TF200540	2 pumps (216 Mld)
North Kyme PS	53.0696°N 0.2502°W	TF173539	2 pumps (87 Mld)
Ringmoor PS	53.0713°N 0.2833°W	TF151540	1 pump (5 Mld)
Farroway PS	53.0651°N 0.2905°W	TF146533	3 pumps (226 Mld)
Digby PS	53.0706°N 0.2962°W	TF142539	2 pumps (87 Mld)

== See also ==
Witham Navigable Drains
Witham Third District IDB
Upper Witham IDB

== Bibliography ==
- Elkington, C. J. (August 2009). "Policy Statement". Witham First District IDB. Archived from the original on 14 March 2012.
- Hinde, K. S. G. (2006). Fenland Pumping Engines. Landmark Publishing Ltd. ISBN 978-1-84306-188-5.
- IDB (2003). "History". Witham First District IDB. Archived from the original on 26 November 2020.
- IDB map. "Lincolnshire Drainage Boards". Witham First District IDB. Archived from the original on 14 March 2012.
- Lobley, Roy (2009). "Strategic Flood Risk Assessment" (PDF). North Kesteven District Council. Archived from the original (PDF) on 3 March 2016.
- Wheeler, William Henry; Batty, Leonard Charles (1896). A History of the Fens of South Lincolnshire. British Library Historical Print Collections. ISBN 978-1-241-32839-9.
