= East Suffolk Water Management Board =

Water management board in Suffolk, England

East Suffolk Water Management Board (ESWMB) is a water management board in East Suffolk District, Suffolk, England. It was reconstituted from the East Suffolk Internal Drainage Board on 24 March 2023.

== East Suffolk Internal Drainage Board ==
The East Suffolk Drainage Board was established in 2008 in accordance with the Statutory Instrument East Suffolk Internal Drainage Board Order, 2008.

This order abolished the Internal Drainage Boards listed below and transferred the property and obligations of these organisations to the ESIDB

- Alderton, Hollesley and Bawdsey Drainage Board, established 1922
- River Blyth Internal Drainage Board, established 1934
- River Deben Internal Drainage Board, established 2005 through the amalgamation of the River Deben (Lower) Internal Drainage Board and the River Deben (upper) Internal Drainage Board, themselves established in 1933.
- Fromus, Alde and Thorpeness Internal Drainage Board, established 1936
- River Gipping Internal Drainage Board, established 1933
- Lower Alde Internal Drainage Board, established 2000
- Minsmere Internal Drainage Board, established 1937
- Upper Alde Internal Drainage Board, established 1936
