= Dogdyke =

Hamlet in the North Kesteven district of Lincolnshire, England

Coordinates: 53.082705°N 0.194219°W

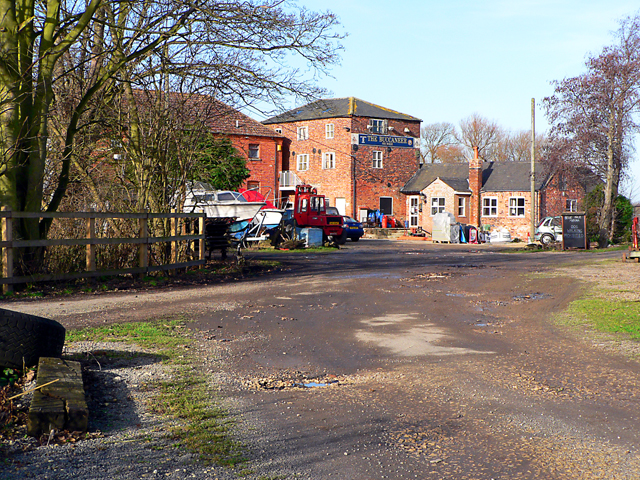
- Dogdyke Marina (former railway station)

- Location within Lincolnshire
- OS grid reference: TF210554
  - London: 110 mi (180 km) S
- District: North Kesteven
- Shire county: Lincolnshire
- Region: East Midlands
- Country: England
- Sovereign state: United Kingdom
- Post town: Lincoln
- Postcode district: LN4
- Police: Lincolnshire
- Fire: Lincolnshire
- Ambulance: East Midlands
- UK Parliament: Louth and Horncastle

Dogdyke is a hamlet in the North Kesteven district of Lincolnshire, England. It is situated approximately 2 miles (3 km) south from Tattershall, and at the confluence of the Rivers Bain and Witham, and close to where the River Slea joins the Witham.

== Community ==
Dogdyke is part of the civil parish of Dogdyke with Chapel Hill within the district of North Kesteven and is within the ecclesiastical parish of Billinghay. The civil parish also includes nearby Tattershall Bridge, where the A153 crosses the Witham. Nearby settlements are the hamlets of Chapel Hill and Tattershall Bridge, and Hawthorn Hill to which Dogdyke is conjoined.

The Chapel of St Nicholas was located at Dogdyke in the 14th century, and was mentioned in 1342. It has long since vanished and its location has not been found. Dogdyke appears as "Dokedyke" in the 14th century, and fell within the ancient wapentake of Langoe.

The hamlet has two public houses, a caravan park and a marina.

=== Drainage ===
The first drainage pump at Dogdyke was built in 1796 and was wind-powered. It was replaced in 1856 by the Dogdyke Pumping Station which was driven by steam, and later by diesel.

Dogdyke falls within the drainage area of the Witham Third District Internal Drainage Board.

Chapel Hill, on the opposite west bank of the Witham, falls within the drainage area of the Witham First District Internal Drainage Board.

== History ==
=== 1975 crash ===
On 3 March 1975 Phantom XV416 from RAF Coningsby hit the top portion of a house in Tattershall Bridge just before 3pm. The pilots had ejected. It occurred 200 yds from the A153. The pilot was 22 year old Flying Officer Phil Tolman, who was married, and from Bedfordshire. The navigator was 30 year old Flight Lieutenant Dave Trotter, who was married. The aircraft came from 111 Squadron.

== See also ==
- Dogdyke railway station
- Dogdyke Engine
