= Commission of sewers =

English public bodies

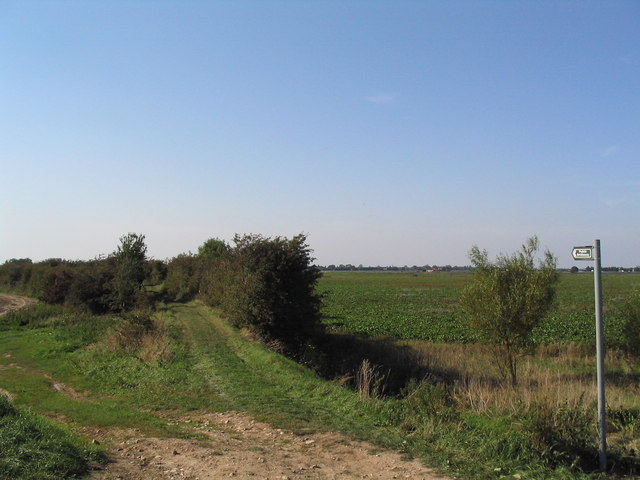
The "old sea bank", built in the medieval era to protect part of The Fens from flooding

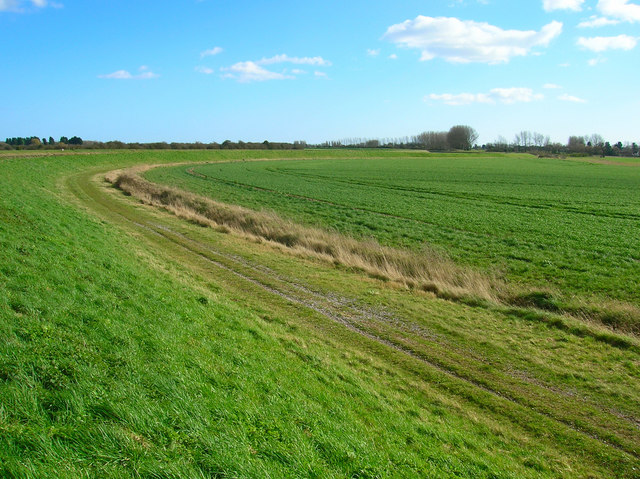
A medieval ditch and bank, constructed for flood defence in West Sussex

A commission of sewers, originally known as commissions de wallis et fossatis (Law Latin: "commissions of walls and ditches [or dikes]") were English public bodies, established by royal decree, that investigated matters of land drainage and flood defence. The commissions developed from commissions of oyer and terminer in the 13th century and had powers to compel labourers to work on flood defences and extract funding for repairs from landowners. The commissions were placed on a statutory basis in 1427 by an act of Parliament, the Sewers Act 1427 (6 Hen. 6. c. 5) and were strengthened by later acts such as the 1531 Statute of Sewers (23 Hen. 8. c. 5) and the Commissions of Sewers Act 1708 (7 Ann. c. 33). The commissions were abolished by the Land Drainage Act 1930, though some survived until after the Second World War. Their duties were assumed by internal drainage boards and river authorities.

Records have not survived from commissions before the early modern era but later commissions sat in sessions similar to the judicial quarter sessions. Commissioners, appointed by royal order, were sometimes known as "justices of sewers". Key officers included the clerk, expenditor (treasurer) and bailiffs (elected by each parish). Other local officers were also sometimes appointed to enforce orders of the commission.

== 13th century origins ==
The commissions de wallis et fossatis had their origins in the 13th century. It appears that previously drainage issues had been dealt with by commissions of oyer and terminer, sittings of judges of assizes to resolve disputes. Henry of Bath sat on such a commission in 1257 to decide a dispute between landowners over the maintenance of ditches and flood defences on Romney Marsh. After passing judgement he was appointed to another commission of oyer and terminer the following year that looked into the matter of flood defences in the area. This was a commission de wallis et fossatis in all but name.

Commissions de wallis et fossatis were established by the later part of the century, the first on the River Thames (at West Ham) was convened in August 1280. The commissions drew their members from the local landowners, supplemented with a small number of civil servants and court officials. They were largely reactive in nature, being formed in response to petitions from landowners concerned over the state of flood defences or in response to actual flooding events. Their remit extended to embankments and drainage ditches (often referred to as sewers, though not in the modern sense) and the commissions had powers to exact funds for repairs from landowners they deemed to be negligent. The jurisdiction of 13th century commissions was often wide-ranging, covering entire counties.

== 14th century ==
Climatic conditions in the early 14th century led to worse flooding and the need for additional defences in the East of England and Somerset. Many landowners refused to take responsibility for the works and commissions de wallis et fossatis had to be formed in order to compel defences to be built. The number of commissions rose in the early part of the century, reaching a minor peak in the 1320s. There was a slow rise in number to a significant peak in 1380, after which the number of commissions dropped off rapidly. The increase in number of commissions was partly due to them becoming more local in nature but also due to increased numbers of flooding events, such as the damaging storm surges in 1374 and 1375.

The increase in number of commissions may also be a result of the Black Death, with plague deaths in 1348–49 affecting labour availability. The increased cost of labour led to less flood defence work being carried out by landowners. Some commissions in this period had powers to compel labourers to work and to arrest and imprison those refusing to do so. Such measures were resented by the peasantry and the 1381 Peasants' Revolt may have led to a reduction in commissions to placate the workers.

Flooding events increased in the late part of the century and flood defences, such as those implemented by repeated commissions at Southwark, became less effective. Investment in flood defences also reduced markedly, possibly as a pragmatic decision that change in land use was inevitable in some locations. Such an area was the farmland at Barking Abbey, which was allowed to be inundated and devolve into salt marshes. Continued increase in labour costs and a drop in grain and livestock prices made farmland less valuable so there was likely a reduction in the number of petitions sent to the crown.

== 15th century and later ==
Sewers Act 1427
- Act of Parliament
- Parliament of England
- Long title: Several commissions of sewers shall be granted. The form of the commission.
- Citation: 6 Hen. 6. c. 5
- Territorial extent: England and Wales; Ireland

Dates
- Royal assent: 25 March 1428
- Commencement: 13 October 1427 (Note: Start of session.)
- Expired: 13 October 1437 (Note: Section 1.)
- Repealed: England and Wales: 28 July 1863; Ireland: 10 August 1872

Other legislation
- Repealed by: England and Wales: Statute Law Revision Act 1863; Ireland: Statute Law (Ireland) Revision Act 1872
- Relates to: Commissioners of Sewers Act 1492

Status: Repealed

Text of statute as originally enacted

Commissioners of Sewers Act 1492
- Act of Parliament
- Parliament of England
- Long title: Commissioners of sewers may execute their own ordinance.
- Citation: 8 Hen. 6. c. 3
- Territorial extent: England and Wales; Ireland

Dates
- Royal assent: 23 February 1430
- Commencement: 22 September 1429
- Repealed: England and Wales: 28 July 1863; Ireland: 10 August 1872

Other legislation
- Repealed by: England and Wales: Statute Law Revision Act 1863; Ireland: Statute Law (Ireland) Revision Act 1872
- Relates to: Sewers Act 1427

Status: Repealed

Text of statute as originally enacted

There was a modest revival in the use of the commissions in the first decade of the 15th century. Most of these commissions were focussed on tidal river areas. The commissions were first placed on a statutory basis in 1427 under an act of Parliament, the Sewers Act 1427 (6 Hen. 6. c. 5). The statute seems to have simply codified existing practice, for example the powers it provided to commissions to appoint local officers were already used by commissions in the 13th century and had been specified in the orders appointing the commissions by 1377. The purpose of the statute may have been to encourage the wider adoption of best practices in use at Romney Marsh, where flood defences were supervised continuously by local officials. The 1427 statute was challenged legally and Parliament had to pass an amended act, the Commissioners of Sewers Act 1492 (8 Hen. 6. c. 3), to confirm the powers of the commissions.

The powers of the commissions were strengthened by the 1531 Statute of Sewers (23 Hen. 8. c. 5) and later legislation, such as the Commissions of Sewers Act 1708 (7 Ann. c. 33), was based on this. In later years the commissions of sewers sat in a court, similar to that of the quarter sessions. The commissions were similar to justices of the peace, and were sometimes referred to as "justices of sewers". The commission might have jurisdiction over a locality, a whole county or parts of two counties. Where a whole county was covered commissions often established subsidiary courts to control localities. Procedure, though modelled after the "ancient custom of Romney Marsh", were often amended to suit local conditions. The principal officers were the clerk (who kept records), the expenditor (treasurer) and the bailiff (sometimes, such as in Lincolnshire, known as dikereeves). The latter were elected by parishes (two bailiffs each) and played a similar role to the constables of the quarter sessions. Sometimes additional local officers were appointed such as a pinder who was appointed in Skegness in 1574 to enforce an order from the commission prohibiting the grazing of cattle on flood defences and marshes.

A jury presented evidence to the court of the state of drainage and flood defences and suggested persons who should be liable to pay for their upkeep. This was often charged as a rate (sometimes known as a scot) based on the acreage of each landowner that would benefit from the works. The commissions relied increasingly on reports from professional surveyors and engineers and less on the juries from the late 18th century. Where land was reclaimed from the sea the responsibility for drainage often fell to enclosure commissioners rather than the sewer commissioners.

The commissions were abolished by the Land Drainage Act 1930, though some survived until after the Second World War. Their work was continued by the internal drainage boards and river authorities. No records survive from commissions held before the mid 16th century but later records have survived and include detailed land maps. The records normally devolved to the successor internal drainage board or river authority, but sometimes were kept by the last clerks, often local solicitors or were deposited in local record offices or parish chest.
