= South Holland IDB =

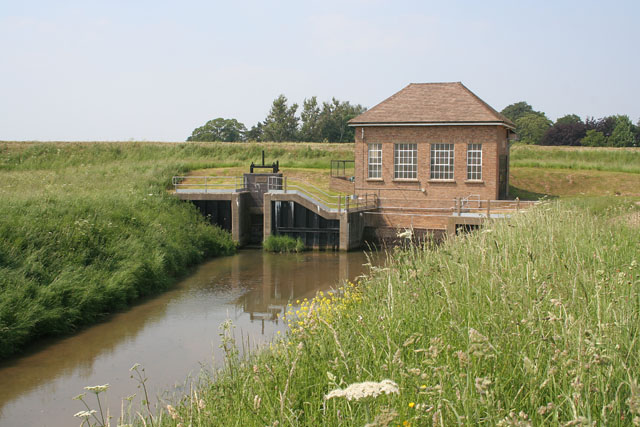
- Lord's Drain pumping station was built in 1962 and pumps into the River Welland.

- Location within Lincolnshire
- OS grid reference: TF358248
- Shire county: Lincolnshire
- Region: East Midlands
- Country: England
- Sovereign state: United Kingdom

South Holland IDB is an English internal drainage board set up under the terms of the Land Drainage Act 1930. It has responsibility for the land drainage of 148.43 square miles (384.4 km^{2}) of low-lying land in South Lincolnshire. It is unusual as its catchment area is the same as the area of the drainage district, and so it does not have to deal with water flowing into the area from surrounding higher ground. No major rivers flow through the area, although the district is bounded by the River Welland to the west and the River Nene to the east.

A ribbon either side of the route from Spalding to Sutton Bridge was populated in Roman times, and was again evident in the Domesday Book. Enclosing and reclamation of the salt marsh to the north of this area took place from the seventeenth century, and drainage was overseen by the Court of Sewers. In 1793, the South Holland Drainage District was set up by Act of Parliament, and carried out extensive drainage work, but the schemes were hampered by the state of the River Nene outfall. This was replaced in 1832, and allowed the district to lower their own sluice in 1852, to provide better gravity discharge. The need to grow more food during and after the Second World War resulted in large areas of grassland being ploughed up for agriculture, and the drains were made deeper and wider to improve the soil conditions. The main outfall sluice was again rebuilt in 1937, and its construction involved the first use of well point dewatering equipment in England.

In 1949, the first electric pumping station was installed, and several more were built in the coming years. Heavy rainfall in July 1968 indicated that the district was still at risk from flooding, and several more electric pumping stations were commissioned. More than half of the district now relies on pumping for its flood protection, although most stations still have a gravity outfall, to cope with breakdowns or power failures.

== Geography ==
The South Holland IDB is responsible for the land drainage of an area of 148.51 square miles (384.6 km^{2}), which is broadly centred on the market town of Holbeach in the South Holland district of Lincolnshire. Its north-eastern boundary is formed by The Wash. Its eastern boundary follows the River Nene inland to Tydd Gote, where it turns to the west, passing near to the villages of Tydd St Mary and Sutton St James. It then turns to the south to include the village of Holbeach Drove and the hamlet of Shepeau Stow, before turning to the north again to Whaplode Drove. From there it turns to the west to reach the New River, which it follows northwards until its junction with the River Welland, which then forms the western boundary back to The Wash.

Within this area, 92 per cent of the land is used for agriculture, with the remaining 8 per cent used for housing and industry. The board is responsible for 435 miles (700 km) of drainage channels, and maintains 17 pumping stations and 30 sluices and other structures to control water levels within its catchment. The Environment Agency are responsible for the main rivers, and the 26 miles (42 km) of sea defences which protect the area from inundation by the sea. The area is crossed by the A151 road from Spalding to Holbeach, which continues as the A17 to Long Sutton and the River Nene crossing at Sutton Bridge. From Holbeach the A17 also heads towards the north-west to cross the River Welland at Fosdyke, on its way to Sleaford.

== History ==
The corridor formed by the road from Spalding to Long Sutton has been a centre for occupation since at least Roman times. There is evidence of intensive occupation to the south of Whaplode and Holbeach, on land which is today between 7.1 and 10 feet (2.16 and 3.05 m) above Ordnance Datum, but which may have been relatively higher compared to the spring tide level in the Roman period. This corridor was protected by banks believed to have been constructed during the Roman occupation. That to the north was the Roman Bank, and protected the area from the sea. The bank to the south was the Raven Bank, and divided the area from a low-lying fen, which was regularly inundated by water from the Welland and the Nene. The habitable area was around 5 miles (8 km) wide between the banks.

From the end of the fourth century, subsidence resulted in flooding of the area, and while Mossop and Elms suggest that occupation and use for agriculture was not re-established until the eleventh century, as evidenced by the Domesday Book, Wheeler and Batty argue that the large number of Saxon endings on place names such as Weston, Moulton, Lutton and Sutton, together with the bech in Holbeach suggest thriving Saxon settlements. Salt marshes gradually developed to the north of the Roman Bank, eventually stretching between 2 and 5 miles (3 and 8 km) beyond the boundary, and these were enclosed bit by bit, resulting in some 55 square miles (140 km^{2}) being reclaimed. Between the Roman Bank and the Raven Bank, the land was divided by headings, as each parish built lateral walls to ensure that they would not be flooded if a neighbouring parish failed to maintain their section of the main banks.

Enclosures continued over many years. 1,121 acres (454 ha) were reclaimed in 1632, in the parish of Tydd St Mary, and another 6,760 acres (2,740 ha) which had formerly been part of Sutton and Lutton marshes, were enclosed in 1660. Also in that year, a much more extensive scheme was carried out by Adventurers, covering 27.15 square miles (70.3 km^{2}) in the parishes of Gedney, Whaplode, Holbeach and Moulton. Smaller areas were reclaimed in 1720, 1747, 1806 and 1865.

=== Early drainage ===
Responsibility for the maintenance of flood defences was gradually established. In 1317, Commissioners were appointed to inspect the banks and sewers in the marshes at Gedney, Holbeach, Sutton and Flete, and to carry out any repairs necessary. In 1571, a Dykereeve's inquest was held at Tydd, the purpose of which was to identify sewers and banks which should be maintained by the parishes. It also recommended that landholders should carry out repairs to the sea banks every year, and imposed penalties for failure to do so. Shortly afterwards, George Carleton, who owned over 1,000 acres (400 ha) between the Whaplode River and the Holbeach River, and who had been responsible for the erection of the first documented drainage mill in England at Elm Leam near Wisbech, wanted to improve the drainage of his land. His plan was to cut drains to the south of Ravens Dyke in Whaplode, Holbeach and Fleet, which would lead to an outfall sluice with an engine at Sutton sea bank. The scheme was opposed by the Lincolnshire Commission of Sewers, who disliked "innovations", and the dispute lasted for many years.

As an alternative, Carleton built a drainage engine where the Holbeach River met the sea bank, but this was destroyed four days after its completion in December 1587, when someone cut through the main supporting beam. The perpetrator was tried, and during the trial it emerged that Carleton had been threatened because of another scheme for a drainage mill as Saturday Bridge on Ravens Dyke. It also became clear that Carleton had carried out the work at his own expense and did not expect to charge the parish for its continued maintenance. In July 1578, Lord Burghley, acting for the Privy Council, attempted to resolve the deadlock over the South Holland drain. He appointed the surveyors John Hexham and Ralph Agas to conduct a survey of the area, and their findings broadly supported Carleton's proposals. Four special commissioners, including Carelton, were appointed to design a course for the drain and were assisted by the engineer Humphrey Bradley. There is no evidence that any work was carried out, and it was not until 1793 that construction of the drain began.

General responsibility for drainage lay with the Court of Sewers, but large parts of South Holland were excluded from this, as they obtained Acts of Parliament to authorise specific work. Such provision had created the Deeping Fen District, the Spalding and Pinchbeck Blue Gowt District, and the South Holland Drainage District. The Court for the remaining areas was known as the Hundred of Elloe, and met at Spalding.

=== South Holland Drainage District ===
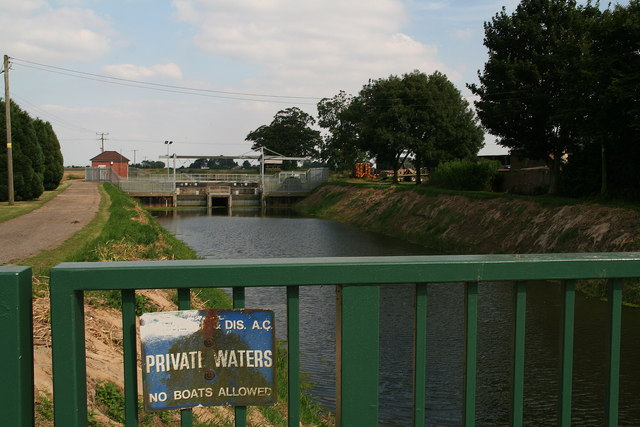
Wiseman's Sluice and Pumping Station on the South Holland Main Drain

The South Holland Drainage District was established by an Act of Parliament obtained in 1793. At the time, the main drain was the Old Shire Drain, which had been cut from Clowes Cross to Tydd in 1629 by the Adventurers of the Bedford Level, a group of early venture capitalists. The drain was also known as the South Eau or Old South Holland Drain, and its outfall was into the River Nene at Tydd Gote through a sluice. Prior to obtaining the Act, landowners in South Holland had engaged George Maxwell and John Hudson to draw up plans for a drainage scheme. Maxwell was a land agent and engineer, while Hudson was a surveyor. They made an initial inspection in November 1791, after which they employed others to conduct a full survey. They returned in August 1792, and Maxwell measured the fall on the proposed route as 8 feet (2.4 m) in 14 miles (23 km). The estimated cost of the project was nearly £18,000, of which the cutting of the drain accounted for £8,450 and the construction of the sluice at Peters Point on the Nene, £3,100. Their plans were well received, and formed the basis for the Act of Parliament.

Commissioners were appointed by the Act, with responsibility for ensuring the drainage of the district. Three of them, including Maxwell and the surveyor Edward Hare, set about raising £38,400, and the work began under the supervision of the civil engineer Thomas Pear. The project took about three years to complete, but Pear died in 1795, and the work was completed by his son, also called Thomas Pear. The area of the drainage district was set at 30.31 square miles (78.5 km^{2}), but this was subsequently increased to 56.87 square miles (147.3 km^{2}). The Act included special provision for the Lord's Drain, which was owned by the Adventurers of Deeping Fen, and was fed with water from that fen through a tunnel which passed under the Welland. The Commissioners paid the Adventurers £1,500, and took over responsibility for it. In addition to the new main drain, running for 14 miles (23 km) from Sutton Bridge to Wheat Meer Drain, the project included two other drains. The highland drain was 5 miles (8.0 km) long, and the lowland drain was 4 miles (6.4 km) long. Three bridges to carry roads were constructed at Dereham Drain, at Gedney Drove, and between Long Sutton and Tydd St Mary. The main sluice, which was completed in 1795, consisted of three arches providing an outfall which was 26 feet (7.9 m) wide.

The scheme included provision for drainage engines, one in Sutton St Mary or Tydd, to pump the main drain into the Nene, and the other on the Lord's Drain. Land owners to the west of the Welland could still route water under the Welland to the Lord's Drain on payment of suitable fees. In order to finance the scheme, the Commissioners could charge an acre tax, which could not exceed £2 per acre, spread over three years, and which was apportioned based on the benefit that the landowner would receive from the works. The outfall of the River Nene was inadequate, and a new one was constructed in 1832, towards which the South Holland trustees contributed £7,000. As a consequence, they were allowed to lower their own outfall, which they did in 1852. The new sluice was 31 feet (9.4 m) wide, and the cill level was 6.33 feet (1.93 m) below Ordnance Datum, some 5 feet (1.5 m) lower than the original sluice constructed in 1795. The sluice controlled the drainage of 53.13 square miles (137.6 km^{2}) of land, and when it was tide locked by water levels in the Nene, levels in the drain rose to 3.7 feet (1.1 m) above Ordnance Datum.

At the southern extremity of the drainage district lies Sutton St Edmund. Its commons were enclosed in 1797, and an Act of Parliament was obtained to drain them in 1809. The first recorded steam-powered pumping station in the Fens was erected there in 1817, to pump water into the South Holland Main Drain. It was a double-acting machine, of 10 or 12 hp (7.5 or 8.9 kW), but was removed in 1834/5, when the North Level Main Drain was constructed and it was no longer needed.

=== Land Drainage Act 1930 ===
A Royal Commission was held in 1927, with Lord Bledisloe acting as its chairman, to consider land drainage in the United Kingdom. It concluded that existing laws were "vague and ill-defined, full of anomalies, obscure, lacking in uniformity, and even chaotic." It recommended that new structures were needed, which would have both the powers to carry out the work necessary for efficient drainage, and sufficient financial resources to enable them to do so. It proposed having catchment boards responsible for each main river, with powers over individual drainage boards, and was essentially the same as had been proposed in 1877 by a select committee of the House of Lords. The Land Drainage Act 1930 enshrined these proposals. For South Holland, the practical outworking was the creation of five internal drainage boards, Holland Elloe IDB, South Holland IDB, South Holland Embankment Drainage Board, South Welland IDB, and Sutton Bridge IDB. From the early 1940s, they formed a pool, sharing resources and manpower when required, and the five constituents amalgamated on 1 August 1974, to become the South Holland IDB. There have been some minor changes to the geographical area covered and to the organisational structure subsequently.

=== Modernisation ===
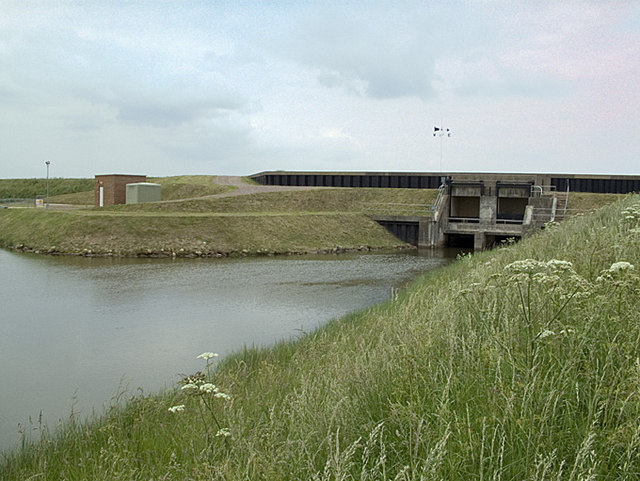
Lawyers Sluice, built in 1949, with the 2003 pumping station to the left

In order to improve the gravity discharge of water from the district, the sluice into the River Nene at Peters Point was rebuilt in 1937. Its width was reduced slightly to 26 feet (7.92 m), but the cill was lowered to 10 feet (3.05 m) below Ordnance Datum. In order to cope with the silty sub-soil in which the foundations had to be built, well point dewatering equipment was used for the first time in England. This consists of inserting small tubes into the ground and pumping them with a high-efficiency vacuum pump to lower the ground water levels, creating a dry and stable working environment. The need to grow more food during the Second World War led to large areas of low-lying grassland being ploughed up for crops, and this required improved drainage. The Main Drain Improvement Scheme was drawn up in 1942, and widening and deeping of the Main Drain and other channels was carried out. Ten new bridges were required, to accommodate the wider channels, and old brick structures were demolished and replaced by open span bridges. Feeder drains were improved, and the area served by the drainage board increased to 63.28 square miles (163.9 km^{2}).

The first electric pumping station was erected at a new outfall for the Lawyers and Andersons districts in 1949, to be followed by several more. The Fleet Haven pumping station cost £21,793 and was completed in 1958/59, and in the same year, Dawsmere pumping station cost £33,868. Lord's Drain pumping station commenced operation in 1962. Sluices were also upgraded, with that on the Holbeach River being commissioned in 1955, and the Lutton Leam outfall sluice following in 1958/59. Despite the improvements, the Fleet Fen area was found to be at risk during flood periods, and a major upgrade, funded by the government, was completed in 1971. It included a new pumping station where the Main Drain and the Fleet River meet, and used submersible pumps for the first time in a land drainage scheme. Extremely heavy rainfall on 11 July 1968, when over 4.9 inches (125 mm) fell on Gedney in the early morning, demonstrated that still more work was required to prevent flooding. Run-off water from Spalding was diverted into the Coronation Channel, a flood-relief bypass for the River Welland, and Clay Lake pumping station was built in 1970, which handles the run-off, but can also be used to pump the adjacent fen when it is not doing so. Five additional pumping stations were built throughout the district. More than half of the area served by the IDB now depends on pumping stations, although most stations still have a gravity outfall, so that power failures or breakdowns are not disastrous. A further six pumping stations have been commissioned since 1974, the latest being brought on-line in July 2003 at Lawyers Sluice, to assist when the 1949-built structure is tidelocked.

== Pumping stations ==
The table shows the location of the 16 pumping stations managed by the South Holland IDB, and where the water is discharged.

Point	Coordinates (Links to map resources)	OS Grid Ref	Notes
Clay Lake PS	52.7772°N 0.1424°W	TF254215	Into River Welland
Wisemans PS	52.7226°N 0.0770°W	TF299156	On South Holland Main Drain
Peartree Hill PS	52.7239°N 0.0379°W	TF326158	Into South Holland Main Drain
Gotts PS	52.7357°N 0.0192°E	TF364172	Into South Holland Main Drain
Roses PS	52.7624°N 0.0668°W	TF305200	Into Little South Holland Drain
Donningtons PS	52.7233°N 0.0382°W	TF325157	Into South Holland Main Drain
Fleet Fen PS	52.7308°N 0.0163°E	TF362167	Into South Holland Main Drain
Little Holland PS	52.7525°N 0.0517°E	TF385191	Into South Holland Main Drain
Sutton St James PS	52.7524°N 0.0532°E	TF386191	Into South Holland Main Drain
Westmere PS	52.7863°N 0.2048°E	TF487232	Into River Nene
Dawsmere PS	52.8338°N 0.1965°E	TF480285	Into The Wash
Fleet Haven PS	52.8743°N 0.1357°E	TF438328	Into The Wash
Manor Farm PS	52.8353°N 0.0798°E	TF401284	Into Fleet Haven tributary
Lawyers PS	52.8897°N 0.0900°E	TF407345	Commissioned 2003. Into The Wash
Holbeach Bank PS	52.8311°N 0.0100°E	TF355278	Into Whaplode River
Lords PS	52.8586°N 0.0769°W	TF295307	Into River Welland

== Bibliography ==
- Darby, H. C. (1956). The Draining of the Fen. Cambridge University Press. ISBN 978-0-521-07430-8.
- Dobson, Alban; Hull, Hubert (1931). The Land Drainage Act 1930. Oxford University Press.
- Hinde, K. S. G. (2006). Fenland Pumping Engines. Landmark Publishing Ltd. ISBN 978-1-84306-188-5.
- Mossop, John; Elms, John (1984). "A brief history of South Holland Internal Drainage Board" (PDF). Archived (PDF) from the original on 3 March 2016.
- Skempton, Sir Alec; et al. (2002). A Biographical Dictionary of Civil Engineers in Great Britain and Ireland: Vol 1: 1500 to 1830. Thomas Telford. ISBN 978-0-7277-2939-2.
- Wheeler, William Henry; Batty, Leonard Charles (1896). A History of the Fens of South Lincolnshire. British Library Historical Print Collections. ISBN 978-1-241-32839-9.
