= Internal drainage board =

Type of operating authority in England and Wales

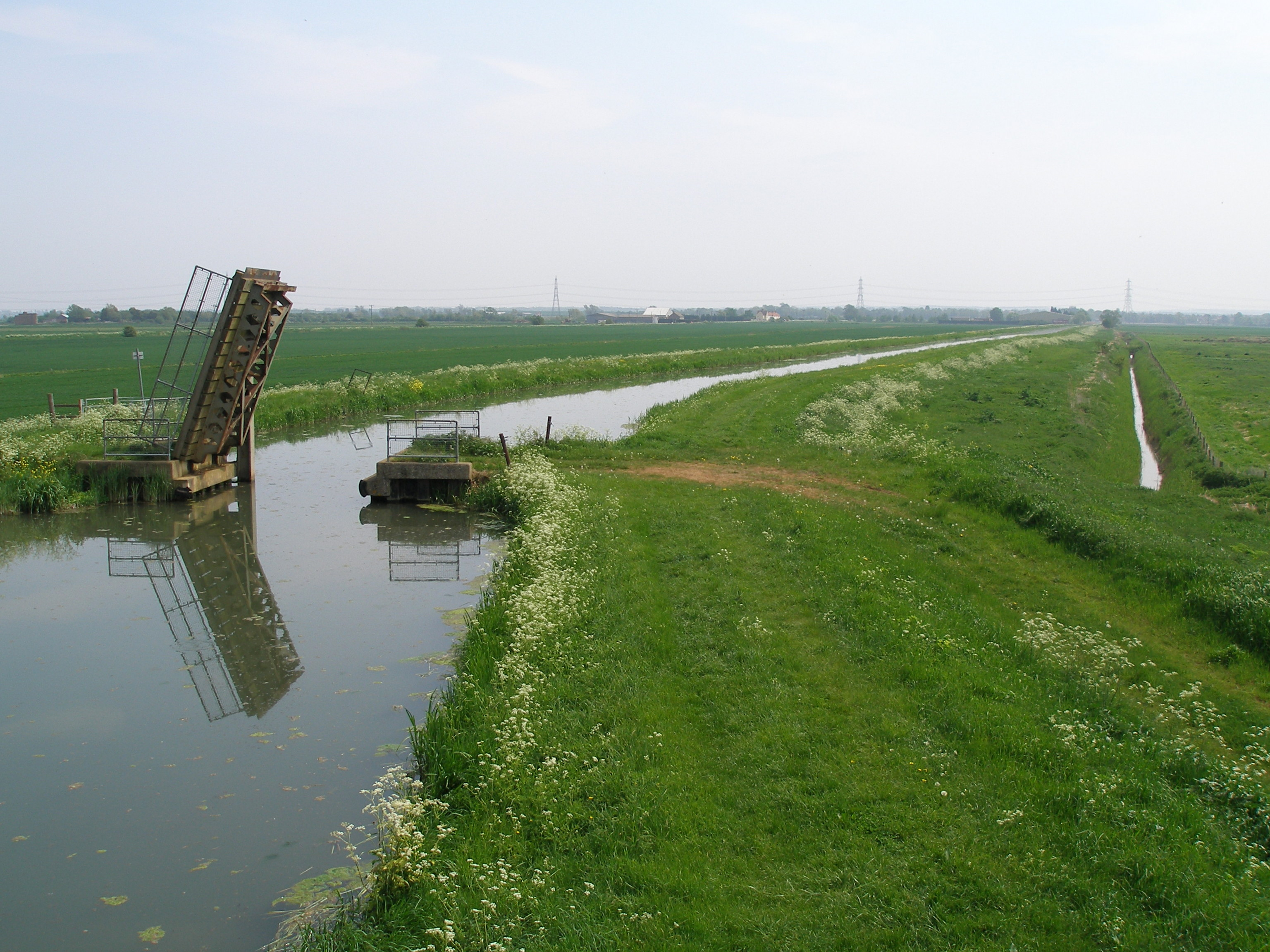
View of Cock up Bridge, Burwell Lode and Swaffham Internal Drainage Board channel, Wicken Fen, Cambridgeshire

An internal drainage board (IDB) is a type of operating authority which is established in areas of special drainage need in England and Wales with permissive powers to undertake work to secure clean water drainage and water level management within drainage districts. The area of an IDB is not determined by county or metropolitan council boundaries, but by water catchment areas within a given region. IDBs are geographically concentrated in the Broads, Fens in East Anglia and Lincolnshire, Somerset Levels and Yorkshire.

In comparison with public bodies in other countries, IDBs are most similar to the Waterschappen of the Netherlands, Consorzi di bonifica e irrigazione of Italy, wateringen of Flanders and Northern France, Watershed Districts of Minnesota, United States and Marsh Bodies of Nova Scotia, Canada.

== Responsibilities ==
Much of their work involves the maintenance of rivers, drainage channels (rhynes), ordinary watercourses, pumping stations and other critical infrastructure, facilitating drainage of new developments, the ecological conservation and enhancement of watercourses, monitoring and advising on planning applications and making sure that any development is carried out in line with legislation (NPPF). IDBs are not responsible for watercourses designated as main rivers within their drainage districts; the supervision of these watercourses is undertaken by the Environment Agency.

The precursors to internal drainage boards date back to 1252; however, the majority of today's IDBs were established by the national government following the passing of the Land Drainage Act 1930 and today predominantly operate under the Land Drainage Act 1991 under which, an IDB is required to exercise a general supervision over all matters relating to water level management of land within its district. Some IDBs may also have other duties, powers and responsibilities under specific legislation for the district (for instance the Middle Level Commissioners are also a navigation authority). IDBs are responsible to Defra from whom all legislation/regulations affecting them are issued. The work of an IDB is closely linked with that of the Environment Agency which has a range of functions providing a supervisory role over them.

== Regulation ==
Defra brought IDBs under the jurisdiction of the Local Government Ombudsman (LGO) from 1 April 2004, and introduced a model complaints procedure for IDBs to operate. This move was aimed to increase the accountability of IDBs to the general public who have an interest in the way that IDBs are run and operate by providing an independent means of review. At this time Defra also revised and re-issued model statutory rules and procedures under which IDBs operate.

== Current internal drainage boards of England ==
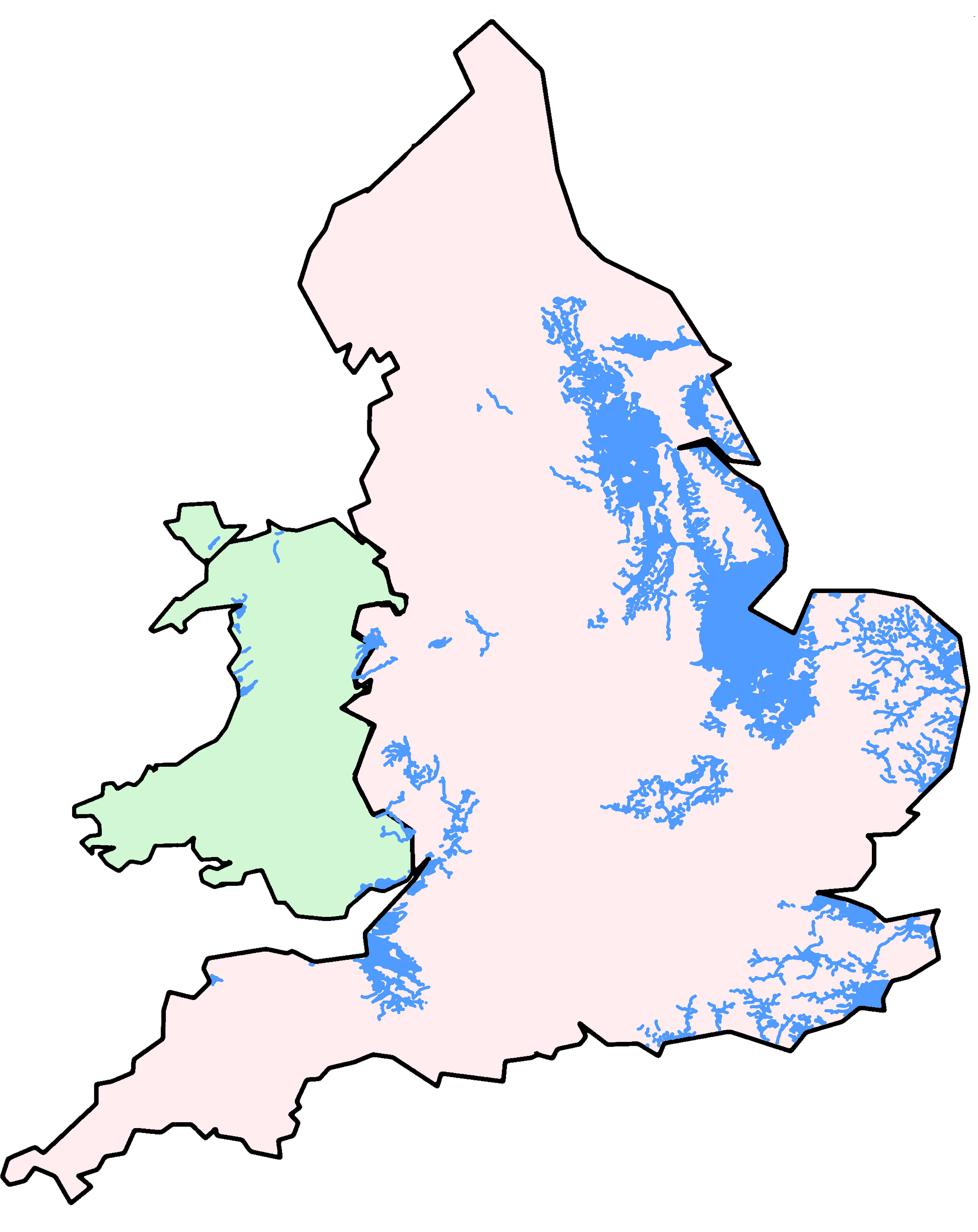
Map of England and Wales showing the area covered by internal drainage districts (blue)

There are 112 internal drainage boards in England as of 2018 covering 1.2 million hectares (9.7% of England's total land area) and areas around The Wash, the Lincolnshire Coast, the lower reaches of the Trent and the Yorkshire Ouse, the Somerset Levels and the Fens have concentrations of adjacent IDBs covering broad areas of lowland. In other parts of the country IDBs stretch in narrow ‘fingers’ up river valleys, separated by less low-lying areas, especially in Norfolk and Suffolk, Sussex, Kent, West Yorkshire, Herefordshire/Shropshire and the northern Vale of York. The largest IDB (Lindsey Marsh DB) covers 52,757 hectares and the smallest (Cawdle Fen IDB) 181 hectares. 24 of the county councils in England include one or more IDB in their area as do six metropolitan districts, and 109 unitary authorities or district councils.

The Association of Drainage Authorities holds a definitive record of all IDBs within England and Wales and their boundaries.

The Environment Agency acts as the internal drainage board for one internal drainage district in East Sussex. In Wales internal drainage districts are managed by Natural Resources Wales.

=== Internal drainage districts in England ===
- Bedford Group of Drainage Boards
  - Alconbury and Ellington Internal Drainage Board.
  - Bedfordshire and River Ivel Internal Drainage Board
  - Buckingham and River Ouzel Internal Drainage Board
- Black Sluice IDB
- Braunton Marsh Drainage Board
- Doncaster East IDB
- Downham Market Group of Internal Drainage Boards
  - Downham and Stow Bardolph IDB
  - East of the Ouse, Polver and Nar IDB
  - Northwold IDB
  - Southery and District IDB
  - Stoke Ferry IDB
  - Stringside IDB
- East Harling IDB
- Ely Group of Internal Drainage Boards
  - Burnt Fen IDB
  - Cawdle Fen IDB
  - Lakenheath IDB
  - Littleport & Downham IDB
  - Middle Fen & Mere IDB
  - Mildenhall IDB
  - Old West IDB
  - Padnal & Waterden IDB
  - Swaffham IDB
  - Waterbeach Level IDB
- Isle of Axholme and North Nottinghamshire WLMB
- Lindsey Marsh Drainage Board
- Lower Medway IDB
- Lower Severn (2005) IDB
- Melverley IDB
- Middle Level Commissioners (34 IDBs)
  - Benwick IDB
  - Bluntisham IDB
  - Churchfield and Plawfield IDB
  - Conington and Holme IDB
  - Curf and Wimblington Combined IDB
  - Euximoor IDB
  - Haddenham Level Drainage Commissioners
  - Hundred Foot Washes IDB
  - Hundred of Wisbech IDB
  - Manea and Welney District Drainage Commissioners
  - March East IDB
  - March Fifth District Drainage Commissioners
  - March Sixth District Drainage Commissioners
  - March Third District Drainage Commissioners
  - March West and White Fen IDB
  - Needham and Laddus IDB
  - Nightlayers IDB
  - Nordelph IDB
  - Over and Willingham IDB
  - Ramsey First (Hollow) IDB
  - Ramsey Fourth (Middlemoor) IDB
  - Ramsey IDB
  - Ramsey, Upwood and Great Raveley IDB
  - Ransonmoor District Drainage Commissioners
  - Sawtry IDB
  - Sutton and Mepal IDB
  - Swavesey Internal Drainage Board
  - Upwell IDB
  - Waldersey IDB
  - Warboys Somersham and Pidley IDB
- North Level District (2010) IDB
- Rea IDB
- Shire Group of IDBS
  - Ancholme IDB
  - Earby and Salterforth IDB
  - Goole and Airmyn IDB
  - Goole Fields District Drainage Board
  - River Lugg IDB
  - Scunthorpe and Gainsborough WMB
  - Kyle & Upper Ouse IDB
  - Selby Area IDB
  - Sow and Penk IDB
- Somerset Drainage Boards Consortium
  - Axe Brue Internal Drainage Board
  - Parrett Internal Drainage Board
  - North Somerset Levels Drainage Board
- River Arun IDD managed by the Environment Agency
- River Stour (Kent) IDB
- Romney Marshes Area IDB
- South Holderness IDB
- Strine IDB
- Swale and Ure Drainage Board
- Thorntree IDB
- Trent Valley IDB
- Upper Medway IDB
- Welland and Deepings IDB
- Water Management Alliance
  - Broads IDB (2006)
  - East Suffolk Water Management Board formerly the East Suffolk IDB
  - King's Lynn IDB
  - Norfolk Rivers IDB
  - Pevensey and Cuckmere WLMB
  - South Holland IDB
  - Waveney, Lower Yare and Lothingland IDB
- Whittlesey Consortium of Internal Drainage Boards
  - Feldale IDB
  - Holmewood and District IDB
  - Whittlesey and District IDB
  - Woodwalton IDB
- Witham & Humber Drainage Boards
  - North East Lindsey Drainage Board
  - Witham First District IDB
  - Upper Witham IDB
  - Witham Third District IDB
- Witham Fourth District IDB
- York Consortium of Drainage Boards
  - Ainsty (2008)
  - Airedale DC
  - Beverley & North Holderness IDB
  - Foss (2008) IDB
  - Ouse and Derwent IDB
- Yorkshire & Humber Drainage Boards
  - Black Drain Drainage Board
  - Cowick & Snaith Internal Drainage Board
  - Danvm Drainage Commissioners
  - Dempster Internal Drainage Board
  - Ouse and Humber Drainage Board
  - Rawcliffe Internal Drainage Board
  - Reedness and Swinefleet Drainage Board
  - Vale of Pickering Internal Drainage Board

Key to abbreviations:

- IDB – internal drainage board
- IDD – internal drainage district (Environment Agency administered)
- WLMB – water level management board
- WMB – water management board

== Water level management and flood risk ==
IDBs have an important role in reducing flood risk through management of water levels and drainage in their districts. The water level management activities of internal drainage boards cover 1.2 million hectares of England which represents 9.7% of the total land area. Reducing the flood risk to ~600,000 people who live or work, and ~879,000 properties located in IDB districts. Whilst many thousands of people outside of these boundaries also derive reduced flood risk from IDB water level management activities. Several forms of critical infrastructure fall within IDB districts including; 56 major power stations (28%) are located within an Internal Drainage District, 68 other major industrial premises and 208 km of motorway. In fact a recent publication by the Association of Drainage Authorities identified that 53% of the installed capacity (potential maximum power output) of major power stations in England and Wales are located within an IDB.

Although of much reduced significance since the 1980s, many IDB districts in Yorkshire and Nottinghamshire lie in areas of coal reserves and drainage has been significantly affected by subsidence from mining. IDBs have played an important role in monitoring and mitigating the effects of this activity and have worked in close collaboration with the coal companies and the Coal Authority.

== Maintenance of watercourses ==
The fundamental role of an internal drainage board is to manage the water level within its district. The majority of lowland rivers and watercourses have been heavily modified by man or are totally artificial channels. All are engineered structures designed and constructed for the primary function of conveying surplus run-off to their outfall efficiently and safely, managing water levels to sustain a multitude of land functions. As with any engineered structure it must be maintained in order to function at or near its design capacity. Annual or bi-annual vegetation clearance and periodic de-silting (dredging) of these rivers and watercourses is therefore an essential component of the whole life cycle of these watercourses.

Accommodating sustainability within the design and maintenance process for lowland rivers and watercourses has to address three essential elements:

- year round conveyance of flows,
- storage of flood peaks,
- retention and protection of flora and fauna dependent on or resident in the water corridor.

Many IDBs are redesigning watercourses to create a two-stage or bermed channel. These have been extensively created in the Lindsey Marsh Drainage Board area of East Lincolnshire to accommodate the three elements of lowland watercourse sustainability.

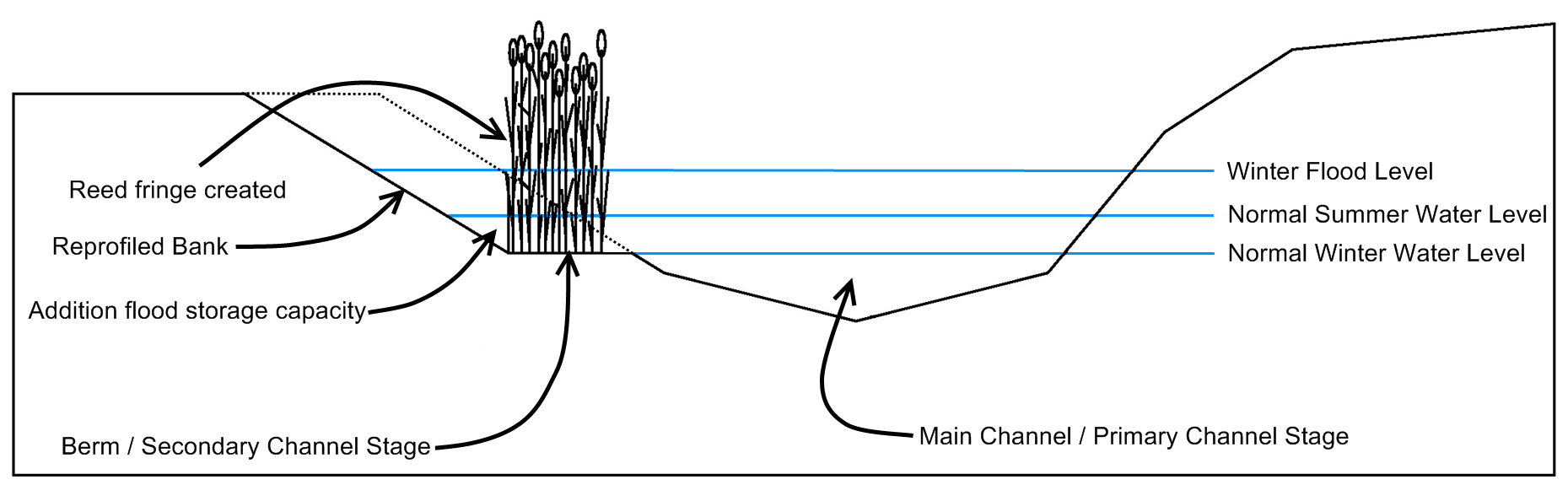

Berms are created at or near to the normal retained water level in the system. It is sometimes replanted with vegetation removed from the watercourse prior to improvement works but is often left to re-colonise naturally. In all cases this additional part of the channel profile allows for enhanced environmental value to develop. The area created above the berm also provides additional flood storage capacity whilst the low level channel can be maintained in such a manner that design conveyance conditions are achieved and flood risk controlled.

By widening the channel and the berm, the berm can be safely used as access for machinery carrying out channel maintenance. While in-channel habitat that develops can be retained for a much longer period during the summer months, flood storage is provided for rare or extreme events and a buffer zone between the channel and any adjacent land use is created.

The timing of vegetation clearance works is essential to striking a sustainable balance in lowland watercourses. The Conveyance Estimating System (CES) is a modelling tool developed through a Defra / Environment Agency research collaboration. IDBs use CES to estimate the seasonal variation of conveyance owing to vegetation growth and other physical parameters which they use to assess the impact of varying the timing of vegetation clearance operations. This is critical during the spring and early summer, the prime nesting season for aquatic birds, the breeding season for many protected mammal species such as water voles and the season when many rare species of plant life flower and seed. Many IDBs have developed vegetation control strategies in co-ordination with Natural England.

== Pumping stations ==
111 IDB districts require pumping to some degree for water level management and 79 are purely gravity boards (where no pumping is required). 53 IDBs have more than 95% of their area dependent on pumping. This means in England some 635,722 hectares (2,454.54 sq mi) of land in IDB districts rely on pumping, almost 51% of the total. A new pumping station was commissioned in April 2011 by the Middle Level Commissioners at Wiggenhall St Germans, Norfolk. The station replaced its 73-year-old predecessor and is vital to the flood risk management of 700 km^{2} (270 sq mi) of surrounding Fenland and 20,000 residential properties. When running at full capacity, it is capable of draining five Olympic-size swimming pools every 2 minutes.

== Emergency actions ==
During times of heavy rainfall and high river levels IDBs:

- liaise with the Environment Agency (in England) or Natural Resources Wales (in Wales) over developing flood conditions
- check sensitive locations and remove restrictions
- take actions, where possible, to reduce risk of flooding to property
- advise local authorities on the developing situation in order that Local Authorities can execute their emergency
- plan effectively for the protection of people, property and critical infrastructure
- assist where possible in any post-flood remedial and clearance operations
- assess flooding incidents to determine if new works can be undertaken to reduce the effect of future flooding incidents

An IDB's priorities during flooding are:

- ensuring the board's systems are working efficiently
- protection of people and residential properties
- protection of commercial properties
- protection of agricultural land and ecologically sensitive sites

Some IDBs are able to provide a 24-hour contact number and most extend office hours during severe emergencies.

== Planning guidance ==
Associated with the powers to regulate activities that may impede drainage, IDBs provide comments to local planning authorities on developments in their district and when asked, make recommendations on measures required to manage flood risk and to provide adequate drainage.

== Environmental responsibilities ==
Internal drainage boards in England have responsibilities associated with 398 Sites of Special Scientific Interest plus other designated environmental areas, in coordination with Natural England. Slow flowing drainage channels such as those managed by IDBs can form an important habitat for a diverse community of aquatic and emergent plants, invertebrates and higher organisms. IDB channels form one of the last refuges in the UK of the BAP registered spined loach (Cobitis Taenia), a small nocturnal bottom-feeding fish that have been recorded only in the lower parts of the Trent and Great Ouse catchments, and in some small rivers and drains in Lincolnshire and East Anglia. All IDBs are currently engaging with their own individual biodiversity action plans which will further enhance their environmental role.

Many IDBs are involved with assisting major wetland biodiversity projects with organisations such as the RSPB, National Trust and the Wildfowl and Wetlands Trust. Many smaller conservation projects are co-ordinated with Wildlife Trusts and local authorities. Current projects include: The Great Fen Project (Middle Level Commissioners), Newport Wetlands Reserve (Caldicot and Wentlooge Levels IDB) and WWT Welney (MLC). Middle Level Commissioners launched a three-year Otter Recovery Project in December 2007. It will build 33 otter holts and 15 other habitat areas.

== Drainage rates ==
All properties within a drainage district are deemed to derive benefit from the activities of an IDB. Every property is therefore subject to a drainage rate paid annually to the IDB.

For the purposes of rating, properties are divided into:

- Agricultural land and buildings
- Other land (such as domestic houses, factories, shops etc.)

Occupiers of all "other land" pay Council Tax or non-domestic rates to the local authority who then are charged by the board. This charge is called the "Special Levy". The board, therefore, only demands drainage rates direct on agricultural land and buildings. The basis of this is that each property has been allotted an "annual value" which were last revised in the early 1990s. The annual value is an amount equal to the yearly rent, or the rent that might be reasonably expected if let on a tenancy from year to year commencing 1 April 1988. The annual value remains the same from year to year. Each year the board lays a rate "in the £" to meet its estimated expenditure. This is multiplied by the annual value to produce the amount of drainage rate due on each property.

== Precepts ==
Under Section 141 of the Water Resources Act 1991 the Environment Agency may issue a precept to an IDB to recover a contribution that the agency considers fair towards their expenses.

Under Section 57 of the Land Drainage Act 1991, in cases where a drainage district receives water from land at a higher level, the IDB may make an application to the Environment Agency for a contribution towards the expenses of dealing with that water.

== District drainage commissioners ==
District drainage commissioners (DDCs) are internal drainage boards set up under local legislation rather than the Land Drainage Act 1991 and its predecessor legislation. The majority of the provisions of the Land Drainage Acts, do however, apply to such commissioners and they are statutory public bodies. The most important in terms of size and revenue is the Middle Level Commissioners.

== Association of Drainage Authorities ==
The majority of internal drainage boards are members of the Association of Drainage Authorities (ADA) their representative organisation. Through ADA the collective views of drainage authorities and other members involved in water level management are represented to government, regulators, other policy makers and stakeholders. At a European level ADA represents IDBs through EUWMA.

In 2013 it was announced that the Caldicot and Wentlooge Levels Internal Drainage Board was to be abolished in April 2015, after officials at the Wales Audit Office detailed a series of irregularities, including overpaying its chief executive, misuse of public funds, financial irregularities, and unlawful actions.
