= Regional flood and coastal committee =

A regional flood and coastal committee (RFCC) is a type of governmental body in England and Wales through which the Environment Agency regions carry out their work on flood risk management. They were established under the provisions of the Flood and Water Management Act 2010, although details of their activities are defined by the RFCC Regulations 2011, and is informed by the National Flood and Coastal Erosion Risk Management Strategy. They replaced regional flood defence committees, {RFDC} which had a similar function.

The committees are made up of members of local authorities, who are appointed by the lead local flood authority, a role defined by the Flood and Water Management Act 2010, together with independent members who are appointed by the Environment Agency. In England, there are twelve regional flood and coastal committees, covering the whole of the country. These are:

Anglian Eastern RFCC
Anglian Great Ouse RFCC
Anglian Northern RFCC
English Severn and Wye RFCC
North West RFCC
Northumbria RFCC
South West RFCC
Southern RFCC
Thames RFCC
Trent RFCC
Wessex RFCC
Yorkshire RFCC
