= River Bain =

River in Lincolnshire, England

River Bain The Bain
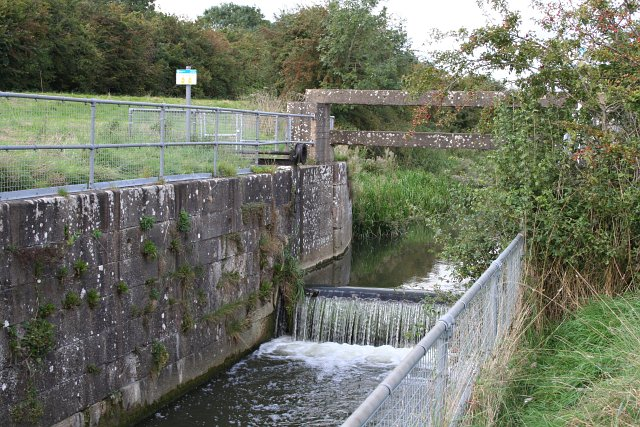
- Tilting Gate Weir near Thornton

Location
- Country: England
- Region: Lincolnshire

Physical characteristics
- Source
  - location: Ludford, Lincolnshire Wolds, England
  - elevation: 130 m (430 ft)
- Mouth: River Witham
  - location: Dogdyke, Tattershall
  - coordinates: 53°5′0.1″N 0°11′45.8″W

Basin features
- Tributaries
  - left: Out Gowt, River Waring, Haltham Beck

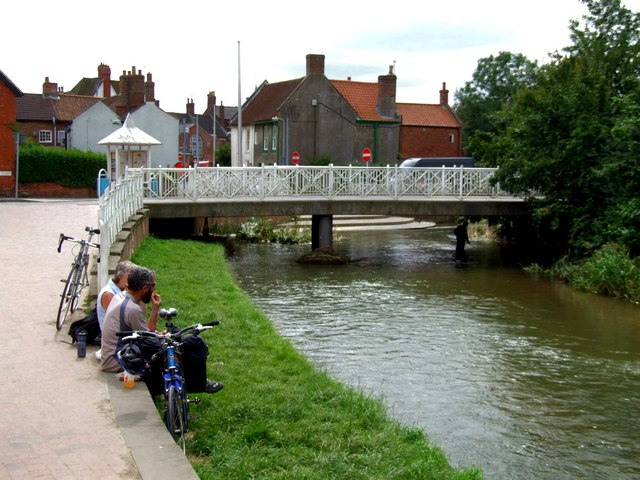
The river in Horncastle

The River Bain is a river in Lincolnshire, England, and a tributary of the River Witham.

The Bain rises in the Lincolnshire Wolds at Ludford, a village on The Viking Way long-distance footpath, and flows through or past the villages of Burgh on Bain, Biscathorpe, Donington on Bain, Goulceby, Asterby and Hemingby before reaching the town of Horncastle where it is joined by the River Waring, which rises at Belchford, 5 miles (8.0 km) to the north east of Horncastle.

After leaving Horncastle, the Bain flows through the villages of Kirkby on Bain, Coningsby and Tattershall, and joins the Witham at Dogdyke. In the late eighteenth and early nineteenth centuries, and after protracted negotiation, a group of venture capitalists led by Sir Joseph Banks canalized the Bain between Horncastle and the Witham. The Horncastle Canal opened in 1802 and was an important goods route before the coming of the railway. It is no longer navigable, but is used extensively by anglers, canoeists, and naturalists.

The river contains significant populations of chub (Leuciscus cephalus), bream, roach and rudd, as well as brown trout, pike, eel, and smaller species such as miller's thumb (Cottus gobio), gudgeon and stone loach (Nœmacheilus barbatus). It is also home to the threatened species of crayfish Austropotamobius pallipes, though there are also populations of the introduced American signal crayfish (Pasifastacus leniusculus), which competes with the native species for food.

The Bain valley was formed by a glacier in the most recent ice-age and, although small, is very obvious. The River Bain is very susceptible to flooding and many floods have occurred during its history, about once every 30–50 years, one of the most recent being the 2007 United Kingdom floods, when the river overtopped its banks all along its course. Horncastle was particularly badly hit. The river once again broke its banks in Horncastle during Storm Babet 20th October 2023.

Settlements in the valley include Tattershall, Coningsby, Kirkby on Bain, Haltham, Roughton, Horncastle, Hemingby, Goulceby with Asterby, Donington on Bain, Burgh on Bain and Ludford.

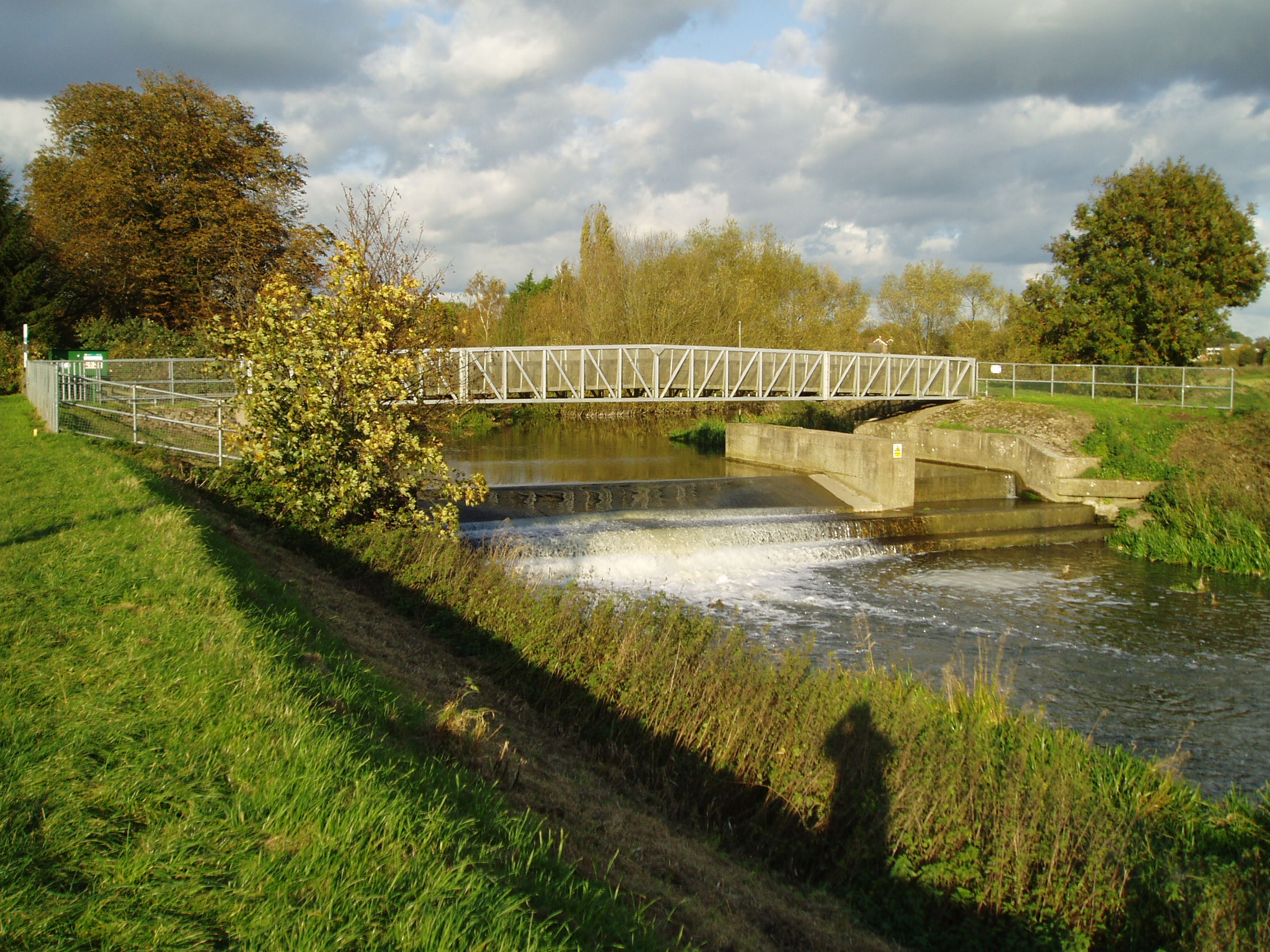
The weir and gauging station at Tattershall

== Crossings of the River Bain/Horncastle Canal ==
This list is incomplete.

Number	Name	Locality	Date	Type	Notes	Image
1	Footbridge by at mouth by the River Witham	Dogdyke			On location of the Lincolnshire Loop Line railway bridge.	
2	Footbridge at Tattershall Lakes Country Park	Dogdyke			Public Footpath	
3	Bridge at Coningsby Ings Pumping Station	Coningsby Ings near Tattershall Castle			Private access	
4	Tattershall Sluice	Tattershall Castle		Steel Truss	Public Footpath	
5	A153 Road Bridge	Coningsby/Tattershall		Concrete Beam		
6	Mason's Bridge	Coningsby/Tattershall		Steel Beam	Public Footpath	
7	Old Railway Bridge	Coningsby/Tattershall		Brick Arch	Disused. Formerly carried the Kirkstead and Little Steeping Railway.	
8	Coningsby Lock Bridge	Coningsby/Tattershall		Concrete Beam	Carries Wharf Lane	
9	Farm Track Bridge	Tumby			Private access	
10	Farm Track Bridge	Tumby			Private access	
11	Bridge at Fulsby Lock	Fulsby			Public Bridleway	
12	Footbridge at St Mary's Church	Kirkby on Bain		Concrete Beam	Public Footpath	
13	Footbridge in Kirkby on Bain	Kirkby on Bain			Private access	
14	Bridge at Kirkby Water Mill	Kirkby on Bain			Public Footpath. Rebuilt after 2007 floods.	
15	Red Mill Bridge	Kirkby on Bain/Haltham		Brick Arch	Carries Rime's Lane.	
16	Footbridge at Haltham Lock	Haltham		Concrete Beam	Public Footpath	
17	Footbridge at Roughton	Roughton			Public Footpath	
18	Bridge at Roughton Lock	Roughton			Private access	
19	Bridge at Dalderby Lock	Dalderby		Concrete Beam	Public Bridleway	
20	Fifty Acre Bridge	Thornton/Horncastle			Carries the Fifty Acre Road. Rebuilt December 2015.	
21	Footbridge at Horncastle Swimming Pool	Horncastle		Concrete Beam	Public Footpath	
22	A158/Jubilee Way Road Bridge	Horncastle				
23	Bridge Street	Horncastle				
24	Bridge at Tesco	Horncastle		Concrete Beam	Public access.	
25	Thimbleby Mill Bridge	Horncastle			Public Footpath. Part of Thimbleby Mill infrastructure	
26	Thimbleby Mill Footbridge	Horncastle			Public Footpath	
27	Sherman's Wath Bridge	West Ashby			Carries Sherman's Wath (Road)	
28	Bridge at Ashby Park	West Ashby			Private access	
29	Bridge at Horncastle Golf and Country Club	West Ashby			Private access	
30	Bridge at Horncastle Golf and Country Club	Hemingby			Private access	
31	Hemingby Bridge at Upper Bain Weir	Hemingby		Concrete Beam	Carries public highway	
32	Bridge at Watermill Farm	Baumber			Private access	
33	Market Bridge	Great Sturton		Concrete Beam	Restricted Byway. Crossing of the Bain by the Lincoln to Skegness Roman Road at this location.	
34	Bridge at Square Plantation	Ranby			Private access	
35	Bridge at Ranby	Ranby			Private access	
36	Bridge at Willow Holt	Goulceby			Private access	
37	Top Lane Bridge	Goulceby			Public highway	
38	C559 Market Stainton Lane Bridge	Market Stainton			Public highway	
39	Bridge at Dinah's plantation	Market Stainton			Public footpath (Market Stainton to Donington on Bain)	
40	Culvert under disused railway	Donington on Bain			Culvert under the embankment of the disused Louth to Bardney railway	
	INCOMPLETE					

This list is incomplete.
