= Holy Trinity Church, Tattershall =

Church in Tattershall, Lincolnshire

Holy Trinity Church
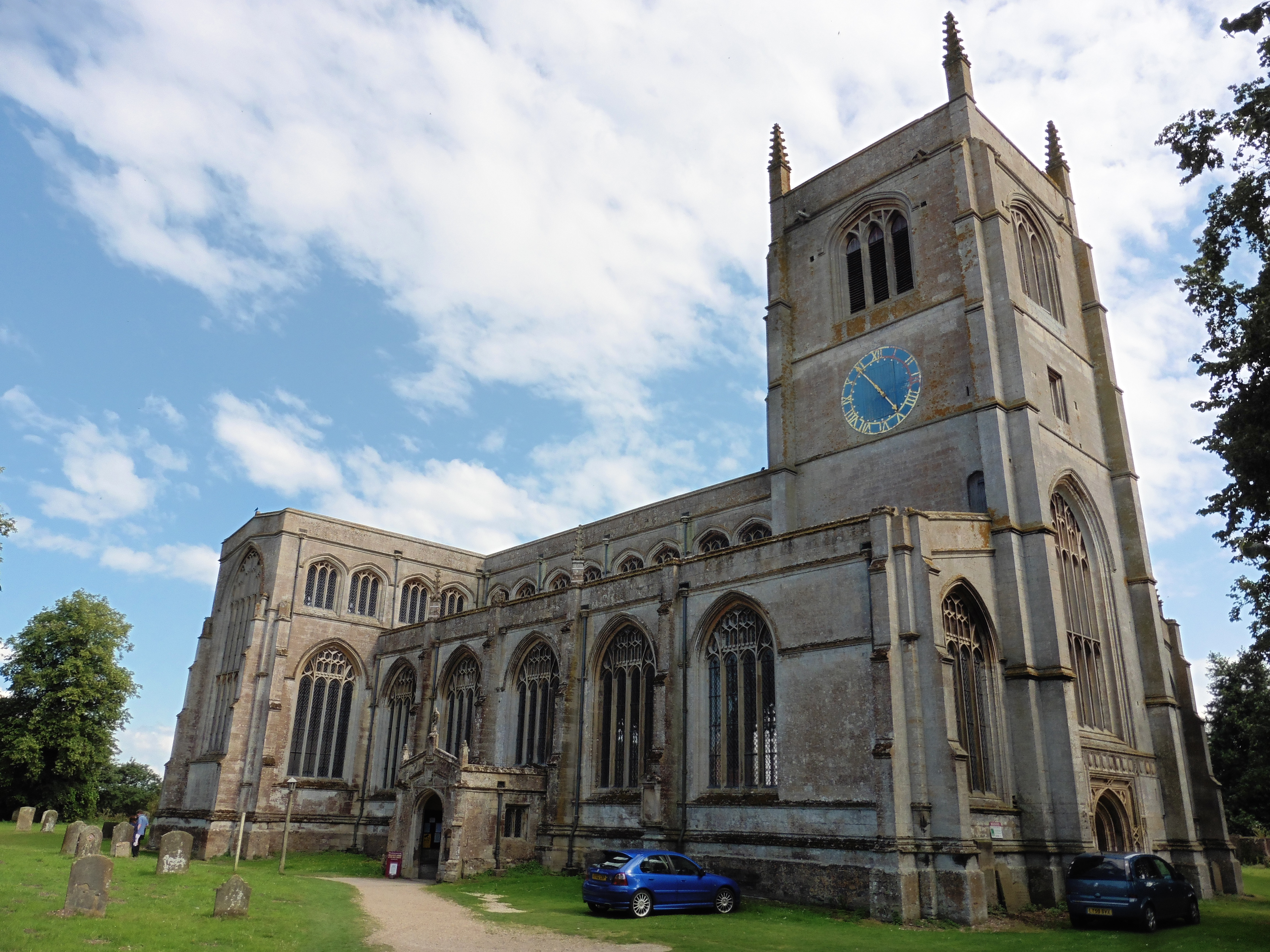

- Location within Lincolnshire
- 53.101713°N 0.190876°W
- OS grid reference: TF 21210 57584
- Location: Tattershall, Lincolnshire
- Country: England
- Denomination: Church of England
- Previous denomination: Roman Catholic

History
- Dedication: Holy Trinity

Architecture
- Heritage designation

Listed Building – Grade I
- Official name: Church of Holy Trinity
- Designated: 14 September 1966
- Reference no.: 1215320
- Style: Perpendicular Gothic

Administration
- Province: Canterbury
- Diocese: Lincoln
- Archdeaconry: Lincoln
- Deanery: Horncastle

Holy Trinity Church is an Anglican place of worship located in Tattershall, Lincolnshire, England. It belongs to the Church of England and is part of a united benefice with three nearby churches.

There was a Norman chapel at Tattershall, but no trace of this remains. The present building was begun in c. 1465 under the provisions of the will of Ralph Cromwell, 3rd Baron Cromwell, who owned Tattershall Castle, and was intended to serve a college of priests founded at Tattershall by Cromwell in 1440. The college was dissolved in 1545 as part of the English Reformation. In 1754 or 1757 most of the medieval stained glass in the church was removed and sold, being installed primarily in Burghley House and St Martin's Church, Stamford; the remaining glass at Tattershall has been re-assembled in the east window.

The church is known for its architecture, being described as "Lincolnshire's grandest Perpendicular church" by the National Churches Trust and as "built regardless of expense for a man who wanted size rather than pretty decoration" in the Buildings of England series. It retains some of its medieval furnishings, including a pulpit, pulpitum, and combined piscina and sedilia. It also contains seven monumental brasses, including particularly elaborate examples which commemorate Cromwell and his wife, Margaret Deincourt, and their nieces Joan and Maud Stanhope. The church is a Grade I listed building.

== Administration ==
Holy Trinity is part of a united benefice that also includes the churches of St Michael, Coningsby; St Margaret, Roughton; and St Mary, Kirkby on Bain as the Bain Valley Churches. The benefice works with the neighbouring Woodhall Spa Group, which unites an additional five churches; the nine churches share a priest in charge.

Tattershall is within the deanery of Horncastle, the archdeaconry of Lincoln, and the diocese of Lincoln. The church has a friends group, the Friends of the Collegiate Church of Holy Trinity.

== History ==
The present church stands on the site of a Norman chapel, of which no trace remains. In 1431 Ralph Cromwell, 3rd Baron Cromwell, the owner of the neighbouring castle, made provision in his will for a chantry chapel to be founded in the church. His ambitions soon increased, and by 1439 he had obtained a charter from Henry VI to found a collegiate church, which was established the following year. Cromwell died in 1456, however his will made provision for the church to be rebuilt and this was done between c. 1465 and c. 1485. The chancel was built by 1472 and glazed by 1480, and the transepts and nave between 1476 and 1479 with their glazing undertaken from 1480 to 1482; building accounts of 1482 indicate that the belfry stage of the tower was then being constructed and glass installed in the windows.

The college established in 1440 consisted of seven priests, six laymen, and six choristers, who were to pray for Cromwell, his grandmother Matilda, and the king. An almshouse for thirteen people was also established. The college was initially assigned nineteen manors, the moieties of four more, and the advowsons of five churches. When it was visited by William Smyth, bishop of Lincoln in 1501 it was found to be in good order, except that the choristers were not taught grammar and the priests were in the habit of dressing like laymen. The composer John Taverner was recorded as a "singing-man" of the college in 1524. As part of the English Reformation the master of the college signed the Act of Supremacy in 1534, and the college itself was dissolved on 4 February 1545.

Most of the medieval stained glass in the church was removed in 1754 or 1757 by the patron, Matthew Fortescue, 2nd baron Fortescue, after the minister complained that it made the church too dark to read the homily. It was sold primarily to the earl of Exeter, who used it in the great hall of Burghley House and St Martin's Church, Stamford, and a small amount went to Warwick Castle.

== Architecture ==
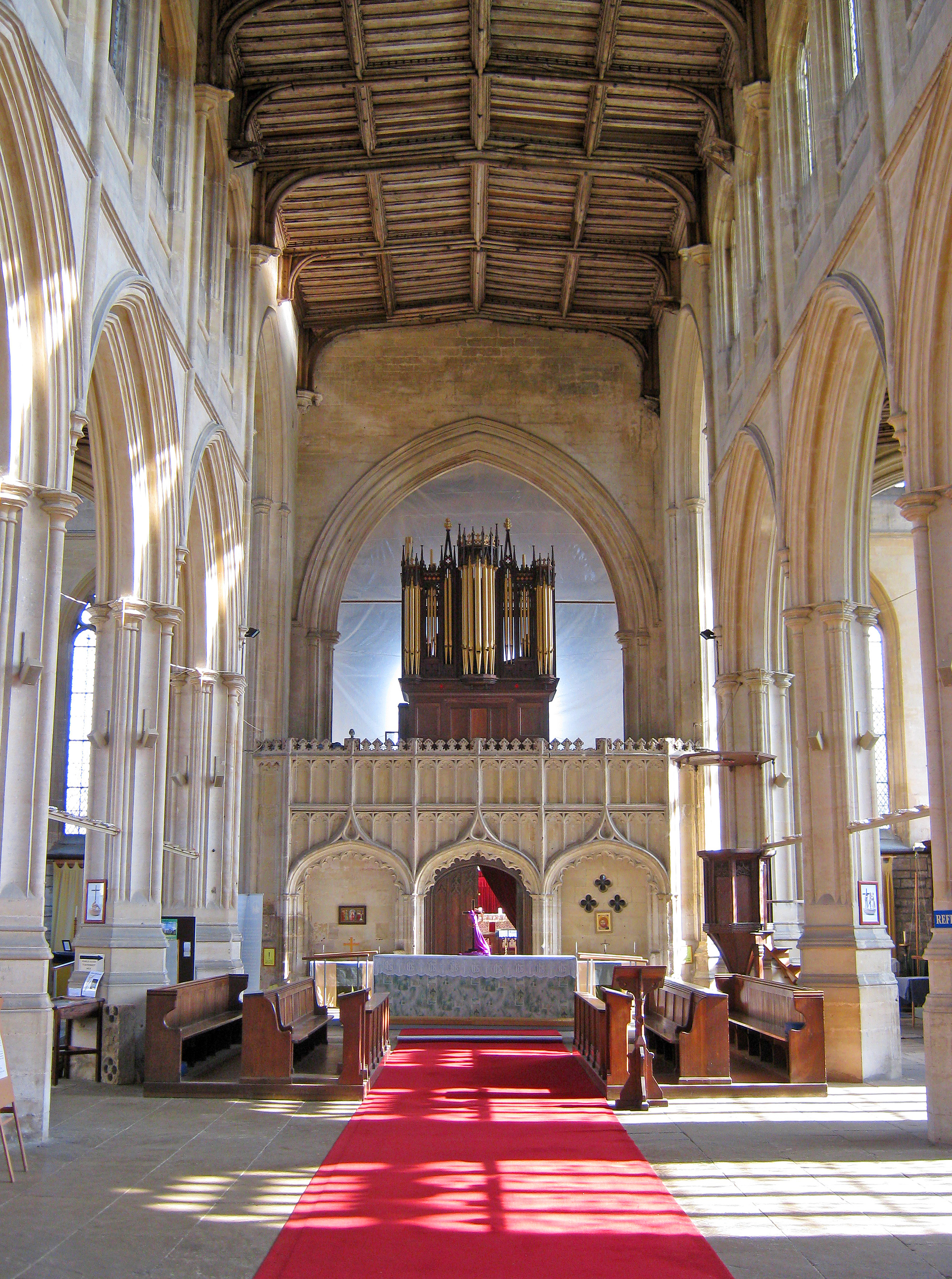
The nave interior looking east

The church is cruciform and dates almost entirely from the building campaign of c. 1465 – c. 1485. Is built in the Perpendicular Gothic style and uses Ancaster stone. It is described in The Buildings of England as "almost gaunt in its absence of ornament – to the extent of all the windows being left without cusping."

The nave is six bays long and aisled. The westernmost bay is slightly longer than the rest and contains the tower, and the easternmost is flanked by transepts. Each aisle has five four-light windows, and the nave a clerestory containing four pairs of three-light windows on each side. The tower is of four stages. The lowest contains the west door, which has tracery in the spandrels and panels which frame it and a row of blank shields above, and the second the five-light west window above. The third stage has rectangular single lights to three sides and a clock face to the north, and the belfry stage a three-light window to each side. There is a modest north porch; the south doors of the nave and south transept are not in their original context, the college having originally lay to the south of the church.

Internally, the westernmost bay of the nave is open to the tower and the easternmost is open to the transepts; there is no conventional crossing. The middle four bays contain an arcade, the piers of which are lozenge-shaped with triple shafts at the corners and convex diagonals; they also have unusually high plinths. The roof is of slight construction, and its arch braces terminate alternately on plain capitals and angel figures. The nave also contains a wooden pulpit which is probably contemporary with the church. The transepts are each of two bays with large six-light windows in their end walls, and are separated from the nave by arches which rise the full height of the interior.

The nave is separated from the chancel by a stone pulpitum, or screen, built by Robert de Whalley in 1528. The side facing the nave has three four-centred arches with ogee gables, that in the centre opening into the passage to the chancel and those to either side originally containing the reredoses of nave altars.

The chancel is of five bays with no aisles or clerestory, and its roof is a little lower than that of the nave. It is generously lit by five large three-light windows to north and south and a seven-light east window; The Buildings of England describes the church as "a glass house". The roof is an elaborated version of that in the nave, with the braces resting on angel corbels and tracery in the spandrels of the arch braces. There is a combined triple sedilia and piscina on the south wall, consisting of four four-centred arches with ogee gables. The exterior south wall contains ledges which originally supported a cloister roof.

== Stained glass ==
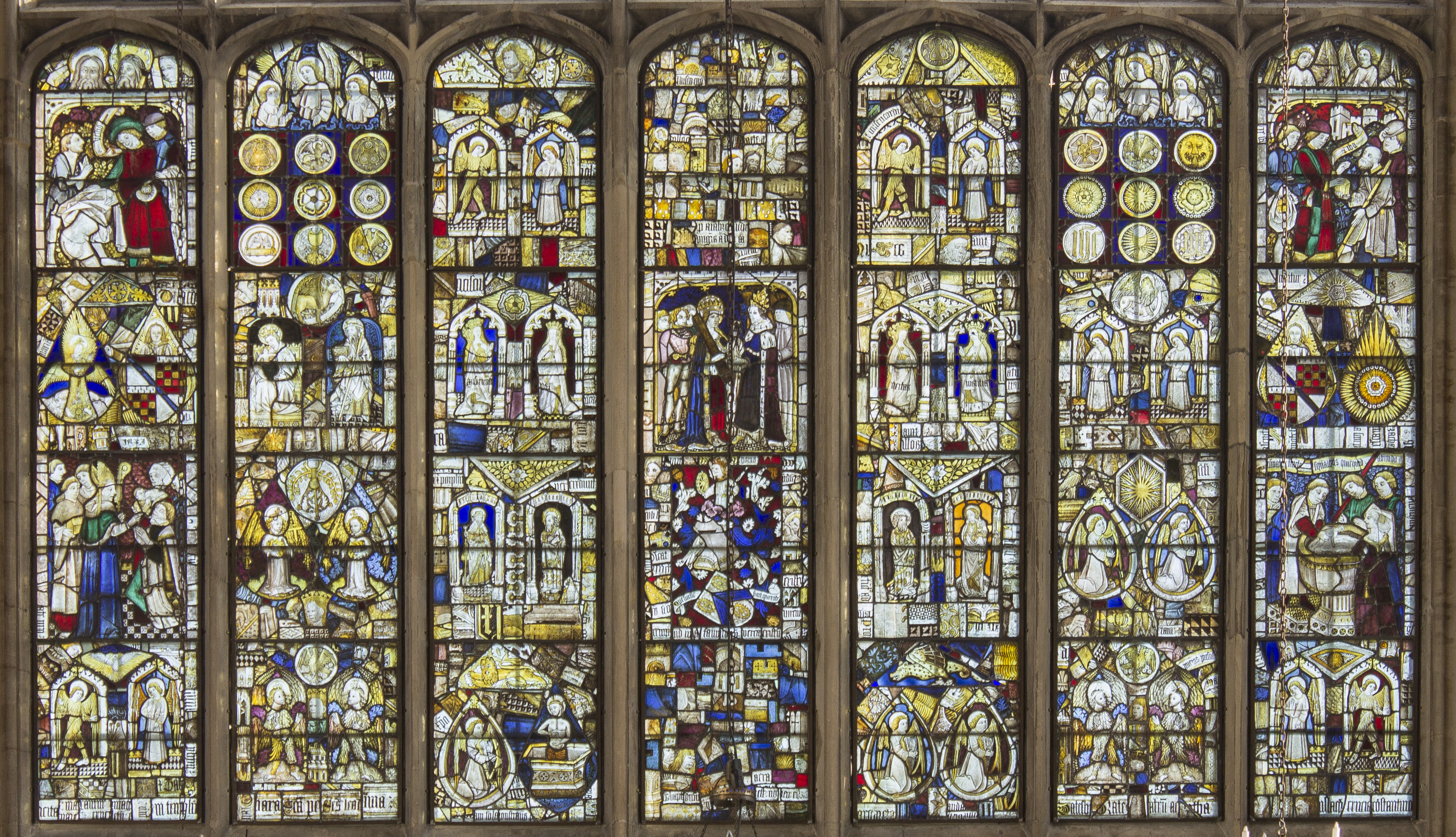
The medieval glass in the east window

The surviving medieval glass at Tattershall was reassembled in the east window c. 1894 and again in 1988. A significant amount of glass from the church survives at St Martin's Church, Stamford, the great hall of Burghley House, and the chapel of Warwick Castle.

The building accounts name the glass painters as Robert Power of Burton upon Trent, John Glasier of Stamford, John Wymondeswalde of Peterborough, and Richard Twygge and Thomas Wodshawe from the West Midlands. The workshops of Power, Glasier, and Wymondeswalde primarily produced glass in their respective locales, and Tattershall is a rare example of their work from further afield. Twygge and Wodshawe, on the other hand, worked across Gloucestershire, Herefordshire, Warwickshire, and Worcestershire as well as at Tattershall and Westminster Abbey.

Despite its fragmentary state, work which can be attributed to all five named glass painters is present in the east window. Twygge and Wodshawe painted the "works of mercy" and "seven sacraments" panels and some angels, Power the one complete and two fragmentary panels from the "holy cross" window and some other figures, and Glasier and Wymondeswalde some heads. The work of each artist is distinct, but their work was united in the use of "jewelled" inserts.

== Monumental brasses ==
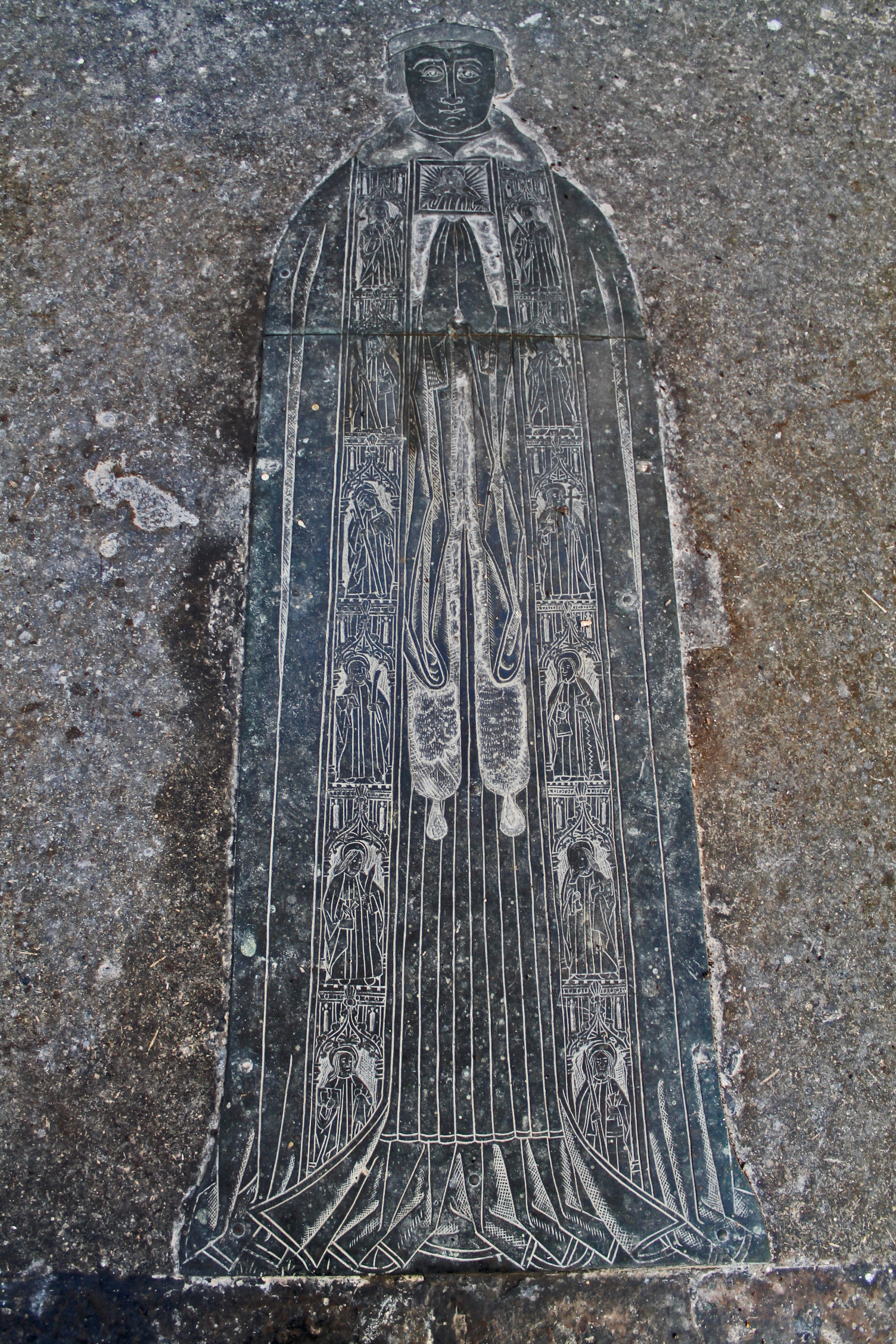
Brass of John Gygur

The church contains seven monumental brasses which commemorate eight individuals:

1. Hugh de Gondeby, d. 1411, steward of Tattershall
2. William Moor, d. 1456, second warden of Tattershall College
3. Ralph Cromwell, 3rd Baron Cromwell, d. 1455/56, and his wife Margaret Deincourt, d. 1454
4. Maud Stanhope, d. 1497, elder niece and co-heir of Ralph and Margaret
5. Joan Stanhope, d. 1490, younger niece and co-heir of Ralph and Margaret
6. John Gygur, d. 1504, warden of Tattershall College and Merton College, Oxford
7. William Symson, d. 1519, chaplain to Edward Hevyn

The brass commemorating Ralph and Margaret was originally a "magnificent" composition that depicted the couple richly dressed beneath an elaborate arched canopy, with an inscription beneath, armorial shields on the background, and a border containing depictions of saints. The complete brass is depicted in an antiquarian drawing now kept at Revesby Abbey, but the only elements to survive are parts of the figure of Ralph, part of the inscription, and part of the border. Despite dying in the 1450s, the couple were depicted in the fashions of the 1470s because the brass was not engraved until the church was complete enough that they could be buried in the chancel.

The brasses to Maud and Joan are also elaborate, and each retains its figure, border, inscription, and part of its canopy. Maud, who became Ralph's sole heir after the death of her sister, also outlived three husbands and is depicted in the dress of a widow; her inscription commemorates her as a benefactor of the college, to which she had given three manors in return for prayers for herself, Joan, their parents, and her three husbands. The brass of Joan depicts her in a similar fashion to that of her aunt, in the robes of a peeress.

Besides the surviving brasses, Tattershall contains seventeen indents, or slabs into which brasses were formerly affixed, and at least five more brasses have been entirely lost.

== Music ==
=== Organ ===
There has been an organ at Tattershall since 1855, when Farmer of Nottingham was paid £56 to build one. This was replaced in 1900 with a Bevington organ moved from the church of St Peter at Gowts, Lincoln, which was itself replaced in 1968 with the current organ from St Paul's Church, West Marsh, Grimsby.

=== Bells ===
The church tower contains six bells hung for full circle ringing. The tenor has a weight of 12 long cwt 1 qr 11 lb (1,383 lb or 627 kg) and is tuned to F♯, and the remaining five are tuned to G♯, A♯, B, C♯, and D♯ respectively. The oldest bells are the tenor and G♯, which were cast in 1691 by Tobias Norris III. The B and C♯ date from 1752 and were cast by Daniel Hedderley, and the A♯ by Charles and George Mears in 1857. The D♯ is the youngest, being cast in 1935 by John Taylor & Co.
