= Gervase Clifton (died 1471) =

English knight and landowner (died 1471)

Sir Gervase Clifton
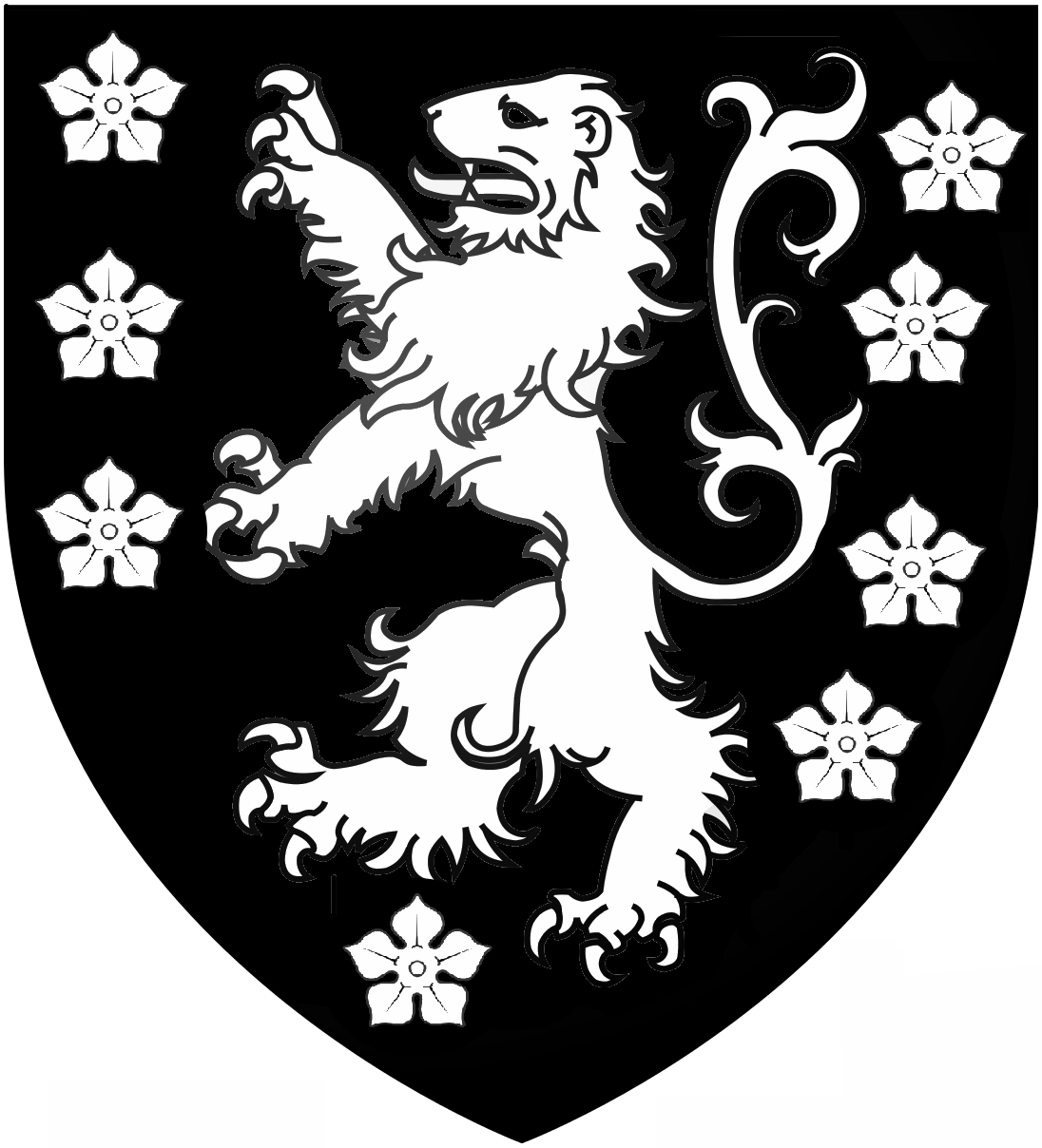
- Arms of Clifton of Clifton, Nottinghamshire (later arms of Clifton baronets (1611) and Baron Clifton (1608) of Leighton Bromswold): Sable semée of cinquefoils and a lion rampant argent
- Died: 6 May 1471; Tewkesbury
- Buried: Brabourne, Kent
- Noble family: Clifton
- Spouses: Isabel Vincent (alias Finche); Maud Stanhope
- Issue: Isabel Clifton; Joan Clifton
- Father: Sir Gervase Clifton
- Mother: Isabel Fraunceys

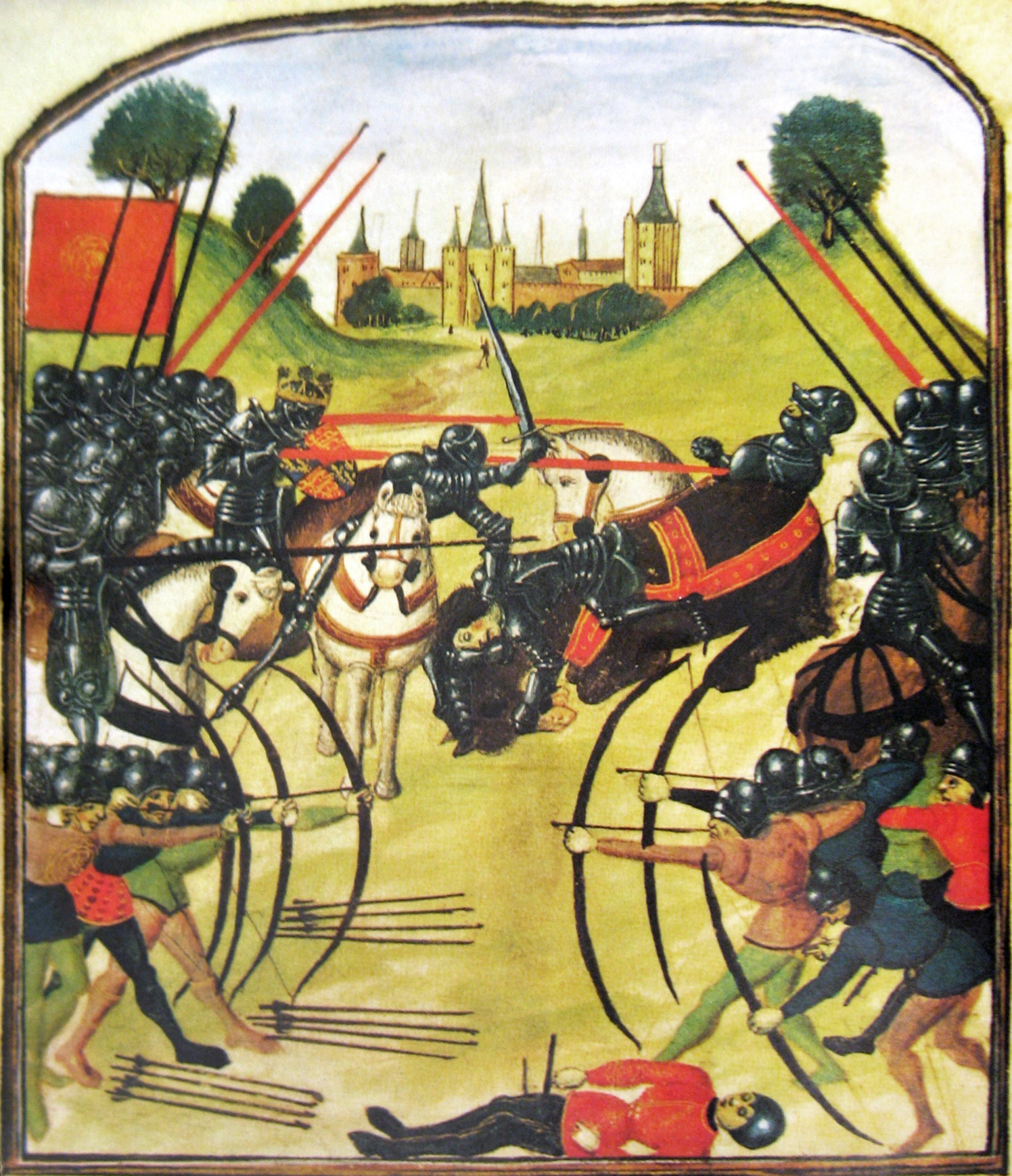
Depiction in Ghent manuscript of the Battle of Tewkesbury, after which Sir Gervase Clifton was beheaded

Sir Gervase Clifton (died 6 May 1471) of Clifton, Nottinghamshire and London was a 15th-century English knight and landowner. He was beheaded after the Battle of Tewkesbury.

== Origins ==
Gervase Clifton (II) was the son of Sir Gervase Clifton (I) (died 15 November 1453) of Hodsock and Clifton, Nottinghamshire, only son of Sir John Clifton (slain at the Battle of Shrewsbury on 21 July 1403), and his wife, Katherine Cressy. The younger Sir Gervase Clifton's mother was Isabel Fraunceys (d. 13 June 1457), the daughter of Sir Robert Fraunceys of Foremark, Derbyshire. His only sibling was a brother, Robert Clifton.

He was a junior member of the Clifton family of Nottinghamshire, descended from the 11th century Alvaredus de Clifton, warden of Nottingham Castle "in the time of William Peverell, bastard son of William the Conqueror".

== Career ==
Clifton served as Lieutenant of Dover Castle and as Captain of Pontoise, France where he was knighted. He came into an estate at Brabourne, Kent, by his marriage to an heiress, Isabel Herbert. He was Mayor of Canterbury in 1450, served as High Sheriff of Kent for 1439, 1450 and 1458 and represented Kent in the Parliament of 1455.

Clifton was not captain of Pontoise; he was not knighted there. There is no contemporary source that Clifton was ever at Pontoise; Hall is a Tudor historian. He was still an esquire when he became Treasurer of Calais in May 1451, not 1450.

He was briefly Treasurer of the Household of Henry VI and Treasurer of Calais in 1450–1460.

He was declared a traitor for his support of Margaret of Anjou. He took part in and was captured at the Battle of Tewkesbury during the Wars of the Roses and was beheaded in Tewkesbury market place along with other Lancastrian leaders on 6 May 1471.

== Marriages and children ==
Clifton married twice, leaving no sons, only two daughters and co-heiresses by his first wife.

=== First wife ===
Clifton's first wife was Isabel Herbert (died c. November 1457), widow of William Scott (died 5 February 1434) of Brabourne, Kent, and daughter of Vincent Herbert (alias Finche) of Netherfield, Sussex by his wife Isabel Cralle, daughter and coheiress of Robert Cralle. Their two daughters were:

- Isabel Clifton, who in 1459 married John Jerningham (died 1503) of Somerleyton, Suffolk, by whom she had two sons and several daughters, including:
  - Sir Edward Jerningham (died 1515), who married firstly Margaret Bedingfield (d. 24 March 1504), and secondly Mary Scrope (d. 25 August 1548).
  - Sir Richard Jerningham (died 1525/6), Gentleman of the Privy Chamber to King Henry VIII, who married Anne Sapcote (d. 14 March 1559), who survived him and remarried to John Russell, 1st Earl of Bedford, by whom she was the mother of Francis Russell, 2nd Earl of Bedford.
  - Margaret (or Mary) Jerningham, who married Thomas Stanhope of Rampton and was the grandmother of Anne Seymour, Duchess of Somerset (née Anne Stanhope).
- Joan Clifton, who married John Digges of Digges Court in Barham, Kent and was the grandmother of the scientist, Leonard Digges.

=== Second wife ===
Clifton's second marriage, before 20 March 1463, was to Maud Stanhope (died 30 August 1497), widow firstly of Robert Willoughby, 6th Baron Willoughby de Eresby (died 1452), and secondly of Sir Thomas Neville (killed at Battle of Wakefield 30 December 1460), second son of Richard Neville, 5th Earl of Salisbury, executed at Pontefract on 31 December 1460 after the Battle of Wakefield. Maud Stanhope was the daughter of Sir Richard Stanhope (died 1436) of Rampton, Nottinghamshire by his second wife, Maud Cromwell (died 30 August 1497), daughter of Ralph Cromwell, 2nd Baron Cromwell (died c. 2 May 1417). Maud Stanhope was the niece and coheiress of Ralph de Cromwell, 3rd Baron Cromwell (d. 4 January 1456), and the heiress of her sister, Joan Stanhope (died 10 March 1490), who had married firstly Sir Humphrey Bourchier (died 1471), slain at the Battle of Barnet on 14 April 1471, and secondly Sir Robert Radfcliffe of Hunstanton, Norfolk.

There were no children from Clifton's second marriage, and after his death his widow, Maud Stanhope, alleged that he had 'wasted and destroyed' more than £1000 worth of jewels, plate and household goods which she brought to the marriage as her dowry. She died 30 August 1497, and was buried in the Collegiate Church at Tattershall, Lincolnshire.;
