= Hemingby =

Dispersed village and civil parish in Lincolnshire, England

Coordinates: 53.252698°N 0.145719°W

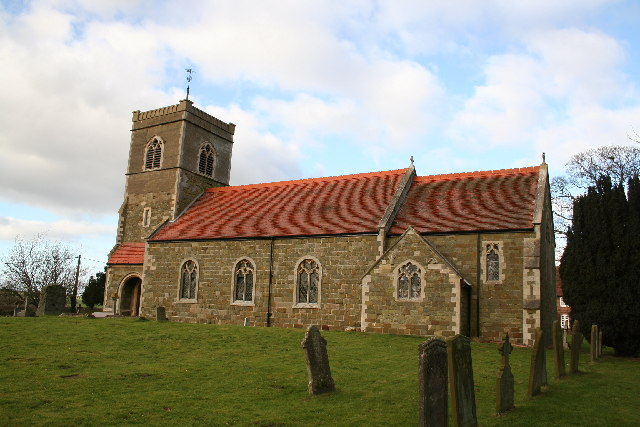
- St Margaret's Church, Hemingby

- Location within Lincolnshire
- Population: 232 (2011)
- OS grid reference: TF238744
  - London: 120 mi (190 km) S
- Civil parish: Hemingby
- District: East Lindsey
- Shire county: Lincolnshire
- Region: East Midlands
- Country: England
- Sovereign state: United Kingdom
- Post town: HORNCASTLE
- Postcode district: LN9
- Dialling code: 01507
- Police: Lincolnshire
- Fire: Lincolnshire
- Ambulance: East Midlands
- UK Parliament: Louth and Horncastle

Hemingby is a dispersed village and civil parish in the East Lindsey district of Lincolnshire, England. It is situated approximately 3 miles (5 km) north from the market town of Horncastle and just west from the junction of the B1225 and A158 roads. It is surrounded by the villages of Baumber, Goulceby and West Ashby. The River Bain and its tributary, the Hemingby Beck, flow through the village. In 2011 the parish had a population of 232.

Hemingby Grade II listed Anglican parish church is dedicated to St. Margaret. Originating in the 14th century it was rebuilt in 1764, and again in 1895.

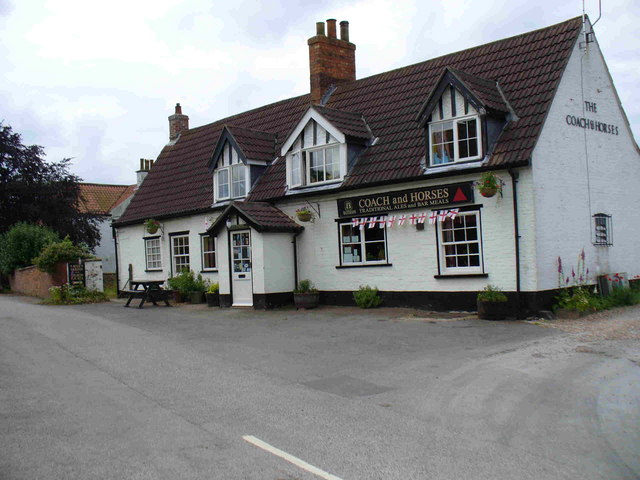
The Coach and Horses, Hemingby

In 1885 Kelly's noted that one of the principal landowners was Earl Manvers. The parish was of 2,527 acres (10 km^{2}) and chief agricultural production was of barley and turnips. A then reported 1859 Wesleyan Methodist chapel building still exists. A free school was founded in 1727 by Jane Lady Dymoke; her endowment provided for the employment of a school master and mistress, and for the clothing and apprenticeship of school children. She also established four almshouses for poor widows; these are today listed buildings. Further listed buildings are the late 18th-century Rookery cottage, and the mid-18th-century Old Rectory with its early 19th-century coach house.

The Methodist chapel existed as such until 1978, the building being converted to a private house in 2007.

The village Coach and Horses public house is a former coaching inn on the old Louth to Lincoln coaching route.

On 18 April 2007 Radio Lincolnshire briefly changed its name to BBC Radio Hemingby for a day, and broadcast from the village.
