= St Lawrence's Church, Hutton Bonville =

Coordinates: 54.3958°N 1.483°W

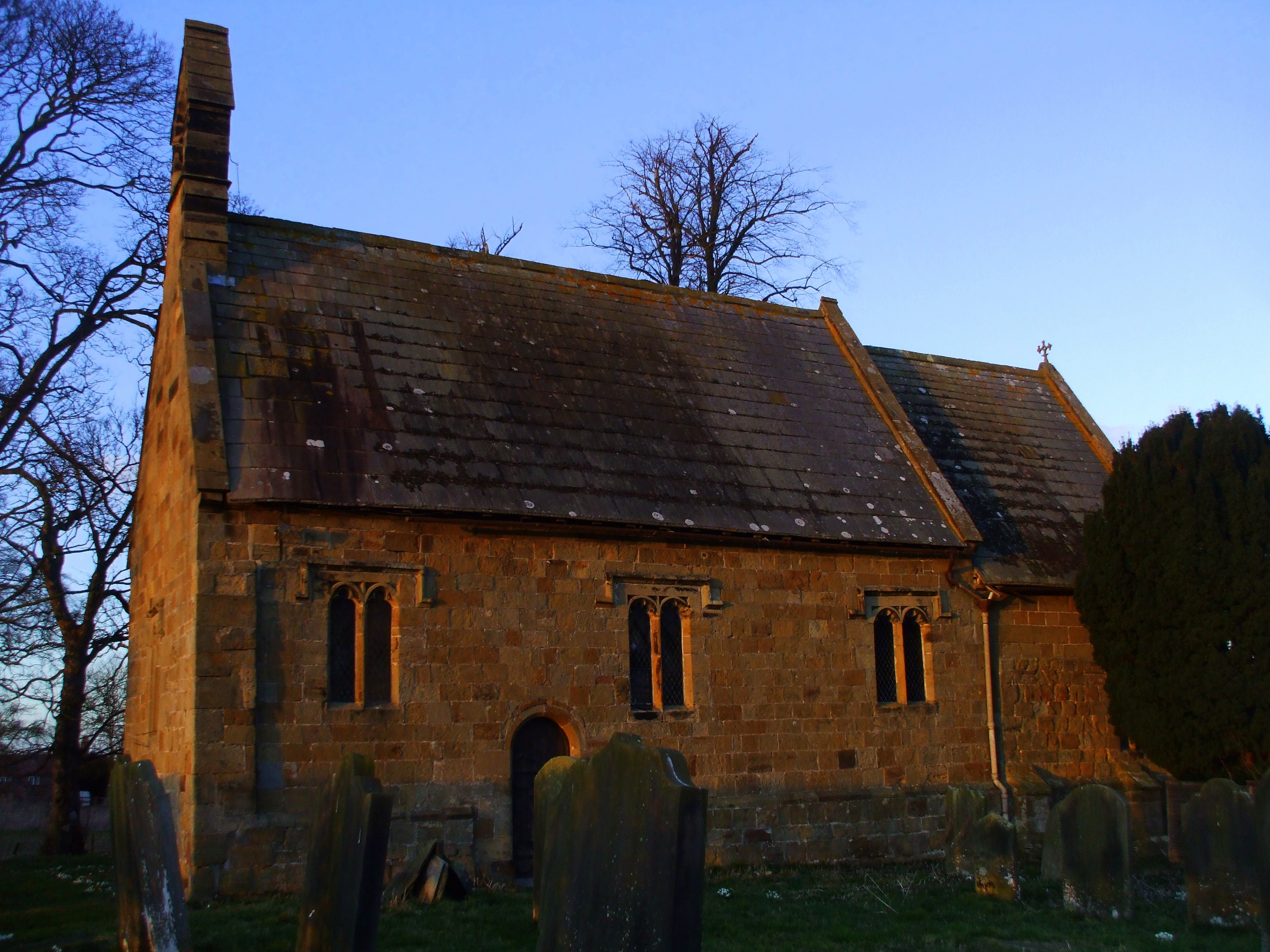

- Location in North Yorkshire
- OS grid reference: NZ 33662 00164
- Location: Hutton Bonville, North Yorkshire
- Country: England
- Denomination: Anglican

History
- Dedication: Saint Lawrence

Architecture
- Functional status: Redundant
- Heritage designation: Grade II
- Designated: 31 March 1970
- Architectural type: Church
- Style: Gothic Revival

Specifications
- Materials: Limestone

The Church of St Lawrence, Hutton Bonville, North Yorkshire, England is a redundant, former estate church which is now in the care of the Friends of Friendless Churches. The church is recorded in the National Heritage List for England as a designated Grade II listed building.

== History and description ==
The church of St Lawrence has origins in the 16th and 17th centuries but was almost completely rebuilt as the estate church for Hutton Bonville Hall in 1896. The rebuilding was undertaken for Sir Henry Beresford-Peirse and was so extensive that "nothing beyond some old walling" was left of the earlier foundation. When Nikolaus Pevsner visited in the early 1960s, to write the entry for his Yorkshire: The North Riding volume of the Buildings of England, the church was "away from anywhere except the decaying Hall". In 1962, Hutton Bonville Hall was demolished, and the church was closed and declared redundant in 2007. In October 2020 it passed to the care of the charity, Friends of Friendless Churches, which is now undertaking repairs.

The church comprises a three-bay nave and a chancel with a gabled bellcote at the western end. The font is Norman in origin and a single Victorian stained glass window remains. Pevsner recorded the presence of a cup and paten by Gabriel Sleath. St Lawrence is a Grade II listed building.

== See also ==
- Listed buildings in Hutton Bonville
- Photographic image of Hutton Bonville Hall published by England’s Lost Country Houses

== Sources ==
- Pevsner, Nikolaus (1966). Yorkshire: The North Riding. The Buildings of England. London: Penguin Books. OCLC 1156437241.
