= Haltham =

Village and civil parish in the East Lindsey district of Lincolnshire, England

Coordinates: 53.156120°N 0.136316°W

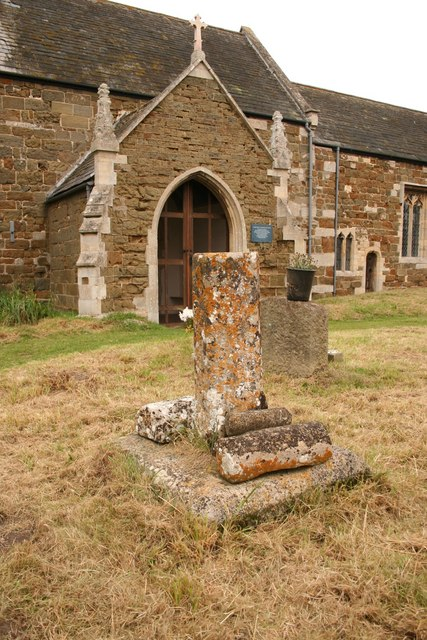
- Churchyard cross and St Benedict's Church, Haltham

- Location within Lincolnshire
- Population: 122 (2011)
- OS grid reference: TF247637
  - London: 110 mi (180 km) S
- Civil parish: Haltham
- District: East Lindsey
- Shire county: Lincolnshire
- Region: East Midlands
- Country: England
- Sovereign state: United Kingdom
- Post town: HORNCASTLE
- Postcode district: LN9
- Dialling code: 01507
- Police: Lincolnshire
- Fire: Lincolnshire
- Ambulance: East Midlands
- UK Parliament: Louth and Horncastle

Haltham is a village and civil parish in the East Lindsey district of Lincolnshire, England. The population of the civil parish at the 2011 census was 122. It is situated 4 miles (6.4 km) south from the town of Horncastle, and on the east bank of the River Bain in the Lincolnshire Wolds, a designated Area of Outstanding Natural Beauty.

== History ==
Haltham is listed in the Domesday Book of 1086 as "Holtha", with 15 households, and King William I as Lord of the manor.

=== Church ===
The parish church was dedicated to Saint Benedict, and is a Grade I listed building built of greenstone and red-brick dating from the 12th century, with restorations in 1881 and 1890. In 1964 Pevsner noted a chalice and flagon, dated 1765, by London silversmith Francis Crump. The church was closed by the Diocese of Lincoln in October 1977, and is now maintained by the Churches Conservation Trust.

In the churchyard is the base of a 14th-century cross which is Grade II listed and also a scheduled monument.

== Geography ==
The village was served by the Marmion Arms public house, a half-timbered thatched building.

In 1885 Kelly's Directory recorded that agricultural production in the then 2,380 acres (9.6 km^{2}) acre parish was chiefly wheat, oats and turnips, The 1881 population was 179.
