= Ranby, Lincolnshire =

Village and civil parish in the East Lindsey district of Lincolnshire, England

Coordinates: 53.290109°N 0.155707°W

Ranby
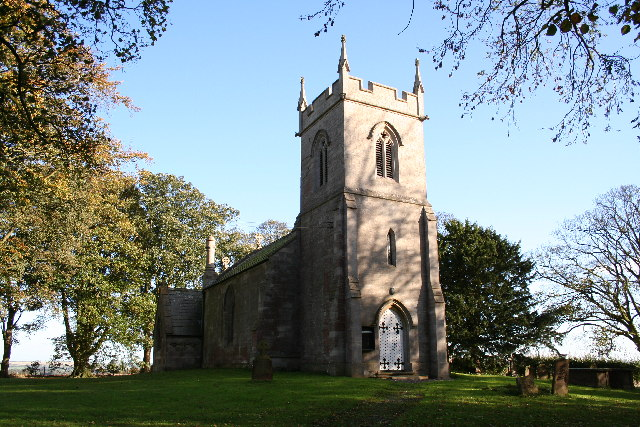
- St German's Church, Ranby

- Location within Lincolnshire
- OS grid reference: TF230786
  - London: 125 mi (201 km) S
- District: East Lindsey
- Shire county: Lincolnshire
- Region: East Midlands
- Country: England
- Sovereign state: United Kingdom
- Post town: Market Rasen
- Postcode district: LN8
- Police: Lincolnshire
- Fire: Lincolnshire
- Ambulance: East Midlands
- UK Parliament: Louth and Horncastle

Ranby is a village and civil parish in the East Lindsey district of Lincolnshire, England. It is situated about 6 miles (10 km) north-west from the market town of Horncastle. It is in the civil parish of Market Stainton.

"Randebi" is listed in the 1086 Domesday Book, consisting of 29 households, a mill and one church.

The parish church, a Grade II listed building dedicated to Saint German (Saint Germain), dates from the 12th century, although it was rebuilt in 1861 by James Fowler reusing earlier fragments.

Ranby Hall is a Grade II listed brick country house dating from 1868.
