= Tattershall College =

Dissolved grammar school in Tattershall, Lincolnshire

Coordinates: 53°6′14.4″N 0°11′22.8″W

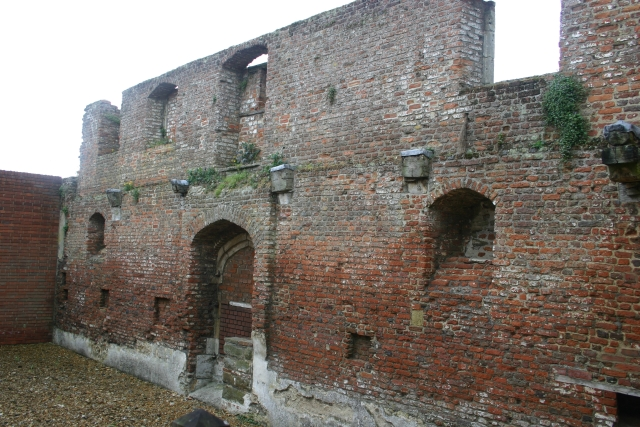
- The remains of the college

Information
- Established: 1439
- Closed: 1545

Tattershall College was a grammar school in Tattershall, Lincolnshire. The college was established in 1439 and the building that still stands today was constructed between 1454 and 1460. This building was built by the 3rd Baron Cromwell for the education of the church choristers and was once a splendid example of the perpendicular style of Gothic architecture.

It was a two-storey, brick-built building with arched doorways and one large room above another large room. It was similar in form to the 1484 built, Grammar School in Wainfleet.

In the 1530s, due to benefactions of fellows, the ex-choristers were given precedence to apply for scholarships at St John's College, Cambridge.

Although the school was formally dissolved in 1545, when it was owned by Charles Brandon, 1st Duke of Suffolk. It is thought that teaching may have continued for some years afterwards.

A timber almshouse attached to the college was built by a carpenter Henry Halsebroke for the warden John Gigur in 1486. It was sited near the churchyard. It had a hall, chapel, and buttery and rooms for 13 pensioners or bedesmen.

In the late 18th century, it was converted into a brewery before being left empty and allowed to deteriorate into the ruin that it now is with those walls that remain standing shored up by modern brick. Heritage Lincolnshire is managing the site.
