= Hutton Bonville =

Hamlet and civil parish in North Yorkshire, England

Coordinates: 54.396840°N 1.482760°W

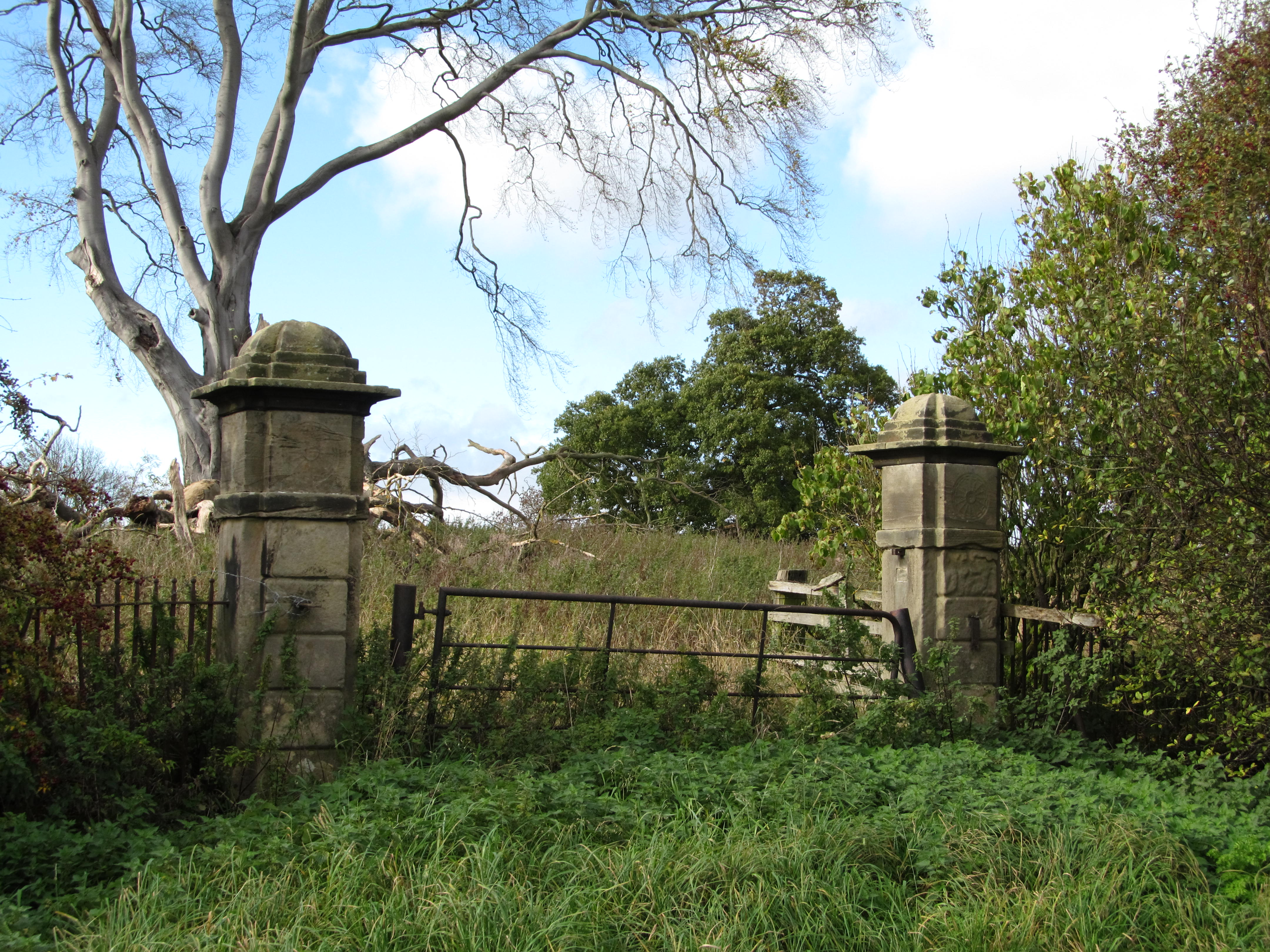
- The gatepiers to the now-demolished Hutton Bonville Hall

- Location within North Yorkshire
- OS grid reference: NZ336002
- Civil parish: Hutton Bonville
- Unitary authority: North Yorkshire
- Ceremonial county: North Yorkshire
- Region: Yorkshire and the Humber
- Country: England
- Sovereign state: United Kingdom
- Post town: NORTHALLERTON
- Postcode district: DL7
- Police: North Yorkshire
- Fire: North Yorkshire
- Ambulance: Yorkshire

Hutton Bonville is a hamlet and civil parish in the county of North Yorkshire, England. The population of the civil parish as of the 2011 census was less than 100. Details are included in the civil parish of Danby Wiske with Lazenby. It is on its own road and near the A167, 6 miles (9.7 km) north of Northallerton.

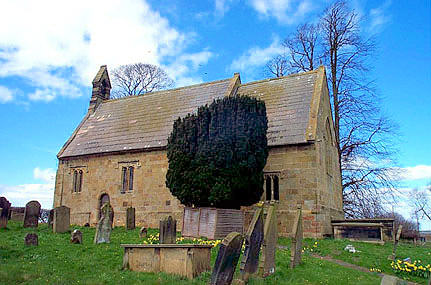
Hutton Bonville, St Lawrence's Church

== History ==
The settlement is listed in the Domesday Book, although it does not record any population. The name derives from Old English hōh (a spur of land by a hill) and tun (town), with the surname of Robert de Boneville, a local landowner during the reign of Henry III, providing the suffix. In the Imperial Gazetteer of England and Wales (1870–72) John Marius Wilson described Hutton Bonville:

HUTTON-BONVILLE, a chapelry in Birkby parish, N. R. Yorkshire; on the river Wiske and the Northeastern railway, 3 miles SSE of Cowton r. station, and 4 NNW of Northallerton. It contains the village of Lovesome-Hill, and its post town is Northallerton. Acres, 1, 080. Rea property, £1, 776. Pop., 129. Houses, 22. Hutton-Bonville Hall is a chief residence. The place is a meet for the Bedale hounds. The living is a p. curacy in the diocese of York. Value, £53. Patron, Mrs. M. A. Pierse. The church is good, and has a bellturret.

About 1785, the manor was sold to the Hammond family of Richmond, Yorkshire, and then in 1874 it was bought by the tenant, J. R. W. Hildyard, who altered the Hall to make it into a country seat.

The church appears to have Norman origins, although what can be seen now largely dates from the later Middle Ages, the 17th, and 19th centuries. Its beginnings were a two-cell structure of nave and chancel, with a later north aisle; but in 1896 that was completely rebuilt as part of restoration works in memory of J. R. W. Hildyard.

From 1974 to 2023 it was part of the Hambleton District, it is now administered by the unitary North Yorkshire Council.

When Nikolaus Pevsner visited the hamlet in the early 1960s, to write the entry for his Yorkshire: The North Riding volume of the Buildings of England, he described the estate church of St Lawrence as "away from anywhere except the decaying Hall". The Hall was demolished in the 1960s, although the gate piers at the start of the drive remain and are a Grade II listed structure. St Lawrence's was declared redundant in 2007. It is now in the care of the Friends of Friendless Churches.

== See also ==
- Listed buildings in Hutton Bonville

== Sources ==
- Pevsner, Nikolaus (1966). Yorkshire: The North Riding. The Buildings of England. London: Penguin Books. OCLC 1156437241.
