= Robert Radcliffe of Hunstanton =

English landowner

Sir Robert Radcliffe or Radclyffe (died 1497) was an English landowner.

Radcliffe was a son of Thomas Radcliffe, and not, as is sometimes stated, a member of the Attleborough branch of the family. His estates were at Hunstanton in Norfolk. He was Steward of the Lincolnshire estates of the Duke of York.

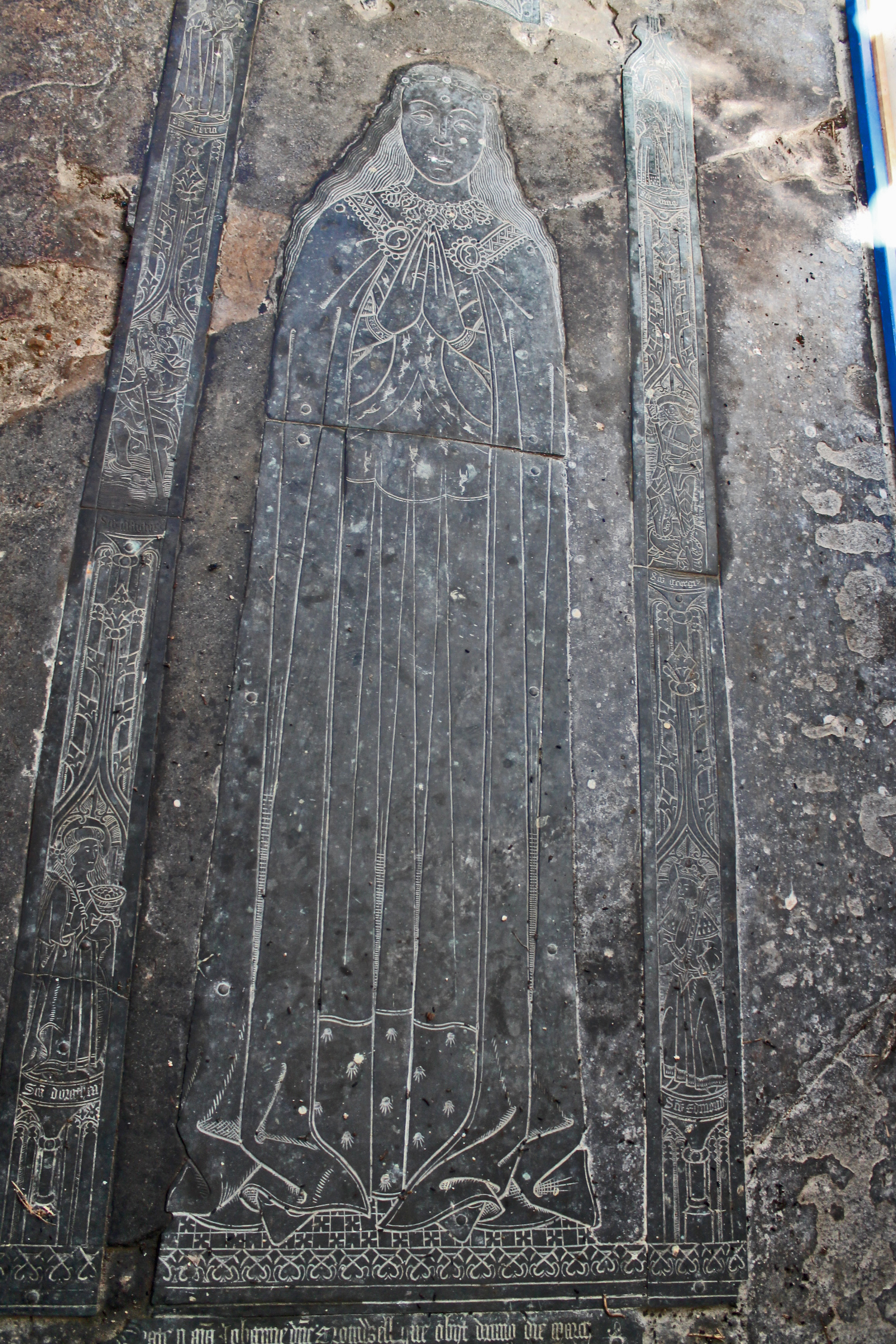
Robert Ratcliffe married Joan, Lady Cromwell, commemorated by a brass at Tattershall

Radcliffe married Joan Stanhope in 1472. She was a daughter of Sir Richard Stanhope and Maud Cromwell, a sister of Ralph Cromwell, 3rd Baron Cromwell. Joan Stanhope's first husband was Sir Humphrey Bourchier, son of Henry Bourchier, 1st Earl of Essex, who was killed at the battle of Barnet in 1471. Joan was an heir of Ralph Cromwell and was known as "Lady Cromwell". Robert Radcliffe became lord of the manor of Tattershall.

Joan Stanhope, Lady Cromwell died on 10 March 1489–90 and was buried at Holy Trinity, Tattershall, near Ralph Cromwell's home at Tattershall Castle, where there is a commemorative brass image formerly including the Radcliffe coat of arms. Radcliffe subsequently married Katherine Drury, a daughter of Roger Drury of Hawstead in Suffolk. Her first husband was Henry Le Strange (died after 1483) of Hunstanton.

Katherine's children by Robert Radcliffe included Ann Radcliffe and Elizabeth Radcliffe. In his will, written in 1496, Robert Radcliffe bequeathed Ann four gold rings, one engraved with an image of the five wounds of Christ, with a bed of gold or gold beads. Elizabeth was given an enamelled gold jewel or beads decorated with Catherine wheels. Ann would keep an embroidered purse containing holy relics and let Elizabeth have it when needed. He gave a vestment embroidered with Joan Stanhope's arms to the church at Tattershall and also paid for the painting and gilding of an image of the Virgin Mary in the collegiate church. Radcliffe left his own gown of crimson velvet (but not its fur collar) to Hunstanton Church, to make a cope with a cloth of gold orphrey embroidered with his and "Dame Kateryne's" heraldry. The tomb and brass, "latten", he mentions in his will for Hunstanton may never have been erected.
