= Burgh on Bain =

Village and civil parish in the East Lindsey district of Lincolnshire, England

Coordinates: 53.360265°N 0.164538°W

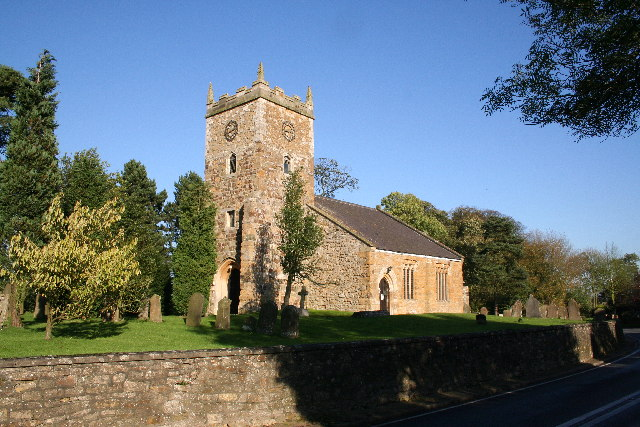
- Church of St Helen, Burgh on Bain

- Location within Lincolnshire
- Population: 172 (Including Gayton le Wold and Grimblethorpe) 2011)
- OS grid reference: TF222863
  - London: 130 mi (210 km) S
- District: East Lindsey
- Shire county: Lincolnshire
- Region: East Midlands
- Country: England
- Sovereign state: United Kingdom
- Post town: Market Rasen
- Postcode district: LN8
- Police: Lincolnshire
- Fire: Lincolnshire
- Ambulance: East Midlands
- UK Parliament: Louth and Horncastle

Burgh on Bain is a village and civil parish in the East Lindsey district of Lincolnshire, England. It is situated on the A157 road, 7 miles (11 km) west from Louth and 7 miles east from Market Rasen. According to the 2001 census it had a population of 114, increasing to 172 at the 2011 census. The parish includes the hamlet of Girsby.

Burgh on Bain Grade II listed Anglican church is dedicated to St Helen.

== Toponymy ==
"Burgh" comes from "burh", meaning fortification, while Bain refers to the River Bain.

== Archaeology ==
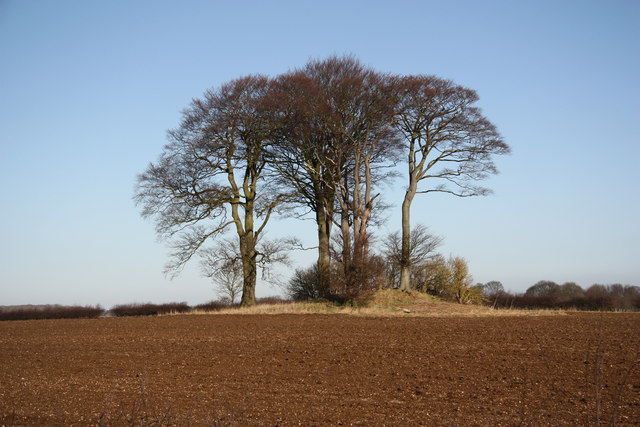
Tumulus surrounded by trees, seen from the High Street

Located on a slope overlooking the Bain Valley is a Neolithic long barrow, marked on maps as a "Tumulus". On the smaller side compared to others found in Lincolnshire, the mound is 27 metres long by 14 metres wide. Today, it is obscured by a cluster of trees and has been burrowed by small animals. In addition, there are several Bronze Age round barrows.

Several artefacts have been discovered in Burgh on Bain's fields, such as a polished flint celt and several arrowheads on the grounds of Baxter Square Farm. These have been preserved in Lincoln Museum and Louth Museum.

== History ==
Burgh on Bain was recorded in the Domesday Book (1086) as part of the wapentake of Wraggoe. Local Bishop's transcripts date back to 1561, while parish records begin in 1575.

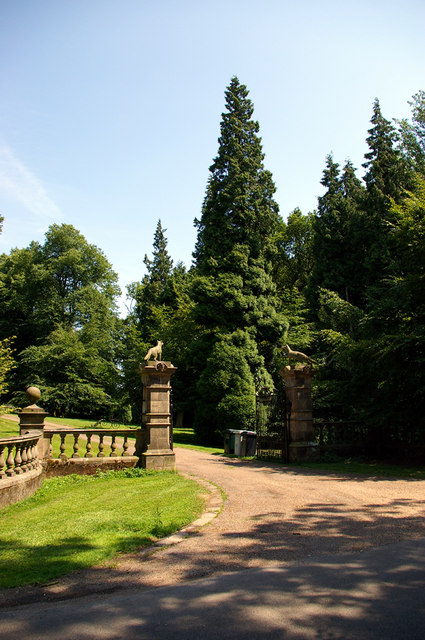
The remaining gateway to the demolished Girsby Manor

There was a manor at Girsby (a medieval settlement), which was owned by the Fox family in the 19th century. It was abandoned before being demolished in the mid 20th century and replaced with a new house.

One of Burgh on Bain's Bronze Age round barrows was excavated when RAF Ludford Magna was built in 1942. From the late 1950s to 1991, another round barrow was used as a Royal Observer Corps monitoring post.
