= Ralph Cromwell, 3rd Baron Cromwell =

English politician and diplomat (1403–1455)

The Right Honourable The Lord Cromwell

Treasurer of England
- In office 1433–1443
- Monarch: Henry VI
- Preceded by: The Lord Scrope of Masham
- Succeeded by: The Lord Sudeley

Chamberlain of the Household
- In office 1450–1455
- Monarch: Henry VI
- Preceded by: The Lord Saye and Sele
- Succeeded by: Thomas Stanley
- In office 1425–1432
- Monarch: Henry VI
- Preceded by: The Lord FitzHugh
- Succeeded by: The Lord Bardolf

Personal details
- Born: Ralph de Cromwell c. 1393 Lambley, Nottinghamshire
- Died: 4 January 1456 South Wingfield, Derbyshire, England
- Resting place: Tattershall, Lincolnshire, England
- Occupation: Politician and diplomat

Arms of Cromwell of Tattershall: Argent, a chief gules overall a bend azure. Tattershall Castle, Lincolnshire was the seat of Ralph de Cromwell, 3rd Baron Cromwell (1403–1455)

Ralph de Cromwell, 3rd Baron Cromwell (c. 1393 – 4 January 1456) was an English politician and diplomat. A Privy Councillor from 1422, he served as Treasurer of England (1433–1443) and twice as Chamberlain of the Household (1425–1432 and 1450–1455) during the reign of Henry VI.

He also owned and developed a number of properties, including Tattershall Castle in Lincolnshire.

== Origins ==
He was the son of Ralph de Cromwell, 2nd Baron Cromwell by his wife Joan Grey, daughter of the chronicler Thomas Grey.

== Early life ==
In his youth, he served in the household of Thomas, Duke of Clarence and joined him when his army crossed into Normandy in August 1412.

Cromwell served Henry V at the Battle of Agincourt in 1415, and throughout the reign, he continued fighting in France. In 1417 he was present when Henry took Caen by assault, and subsequently acted as Clarence's lieutenant and constable of the army. He was present at the capture of Courtonne on 6 March 1418, of Chambrays on the 9th, and of Rivière-Thibonville on the 11th. In May 1420 he was one of the commissioners who assisted Henry in negotiating the Treaty of Troyes.

== Politics ==
Cromwell gained the confidence of Henry V and of his brother John, Duke of Bedford, and during the minority of Henry VI, he gained an important position among the lords of the council.

He was first summoned to parliament on 29 September 1422, and in November he was one of the lords appointed in parliament to form the council of regency. Soon afterwards he was appointed Chamberlain of the Household, and on 29 January 1426, he was one of those sent to mediate with Humphrey, Duke of Gloucester and reconcile him with Cardinal Beaufort.

He seems to have generally sided with Beaufort against Gloucester, and on 1 March 1432, during Beaufort's absence in France, Gloucester seized the opportunity to remove the cardinal's friends from office and Cromwell lost the Chamberlainship. In the following May he was warned not to bring more than his usual retinue to parliament, but on 16 June, following Beaufort's example, he laid his case before the House of Lords.

He complained that he had been dismissed without cause shown and contrary to the ordinances of 1429, by which the council's proceedings were regulated. He appealed to testimonials from Bedford as to the value of his services in France, but an assurance that he left office without a stain on his character was all the satisfaction he could get.

In the summer of 1433, Bedford returned to England, and during his visit, the disgraced ministers were restored to power, with Cromwell made Treasurer of England. During his tenure, the French war was the single biggest drain on resources, and the crown debt significantly increased despite his attempts to rein in spending and introduce reforms. Cromwell's tenure as Lord High Treasurer also occurred during the Great Bullion Famine and the beginning of the Great Slump in England. In July 1443 Cromwell resigned his post as Treasurer, possibly due to the rising influence of William de la Pole, Duke of Suffolk, who now succeeded Beaufort as the most influential adviser of the king. Instead he took the position of Chamberlain of the Exchequer, a post he held until 1455.

Cromwell does not again come prominently forward until 1449. One of Suffolk's partisans was William Tailboys, a Lincolnshire squire, with whom Cromwell had had some local disputes; and on 28 November 1449, Cromwell was attacked by Tailboys. Cromwell began legal proceedings against Tailboys, but was blocked by Suffolk, against whom Cromwell seemingly began impeachment proceedings. Tailboys was sent to the Tower of London and later convicted in February 1450. Suffolk was impeached by the Commons in January 1450 and later murdered on crossing to France. Cromwell was reappointed Chamberlain of the Household in the same year.

The fall of Suffolk let loose a flood of personal jealousies, and among Cromwell's enemies were Yorkists as well as Lancastrians, though he seems to have belonged to the former party. This included a bitter disagreement over lands with Henry Holland, Duke of Exeter.

== Landholdings ==
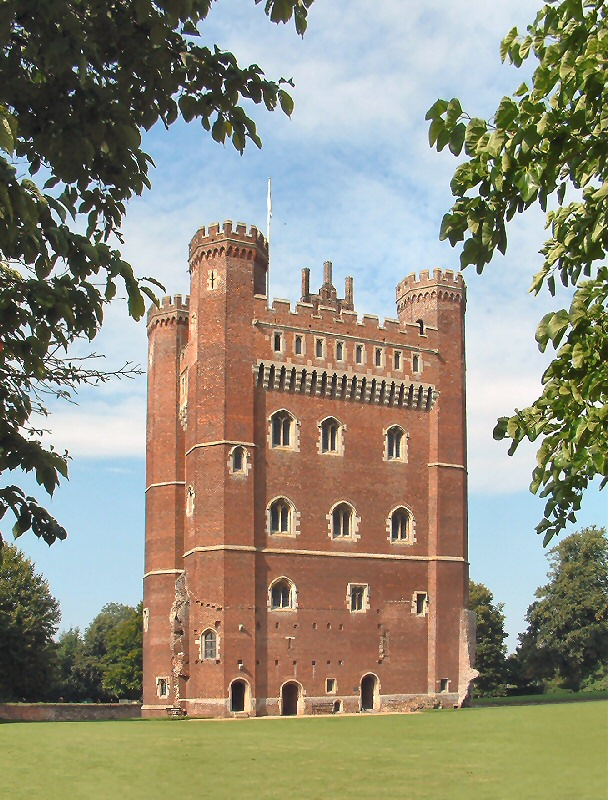
The Grand Tower of Tattershall Castle in Lincolnshire

Cromwell financed a number of projects in his lifetime. These included properties at Collyweston in Northamptonshire and at South Wingfield in Derbyshire. He instructed in his will that the church at Lambley in Nottinghamshire be rebuilt, where his parents and grandparents were buried.

He inherited Tattershall Castle in Lincolnshire, which became his primary residence. Here, he funded the construction of several buildings, including the Grand Tower at the castle, the college, the Holy Trinity church and two almshouses. The Grand Tower is described by the National Trust, to whom it was given in 1925, as "a masterpiece of early English brickwork" and as "one of the three most important surviving mid-15th-century brick castles in England".

Cromwell acquired a manor in Wymondham in Norfolk which still bears his name today.

== Marriage, death and burial ==
At some time before 1433, he married Margaret Deincourt (d.1454), daughter and co-heiress with her sister Alice of John Deincourt, 12th Baron Deincourt, without children.

Cromwell died on 4 January 1456 at South Wingfield in Derbyshire and was buried at Holy Trinity Church, Tattershall.

== Succession ==
As he died without children the barony fell into abeyance between his two nieces, daughters of his only sister Maud, second wife of Sir Richard Stanhope:

- Maud Stanhope (d.1497), elder niece and eventual sole heiress, who married firstly Robert Willoughby, 6th Baron Willoughby de Eresby; secondly Sir Thomas Neville, son of Richard Neville, 5th Earl of Salisbury; and thirdly Sir Gervase Clifton.
- Joan Stanhope (d.1490), younger niece, who married firstly Sir Humphrey Bourchier, son of Henry Bourchier, 1st Earl of Essex, who was summoned to Parliament from 1461 to 1471 as Lord Cromwell or Lord Bourchier de Cromwell; and secondly Sir Robert Radcliffe of Hunstanton. Following Joan's death in 1490, Maud became the sole heiress and succeeded to the barony. Tattershall Castle was inherited by Joan, but was confiscated by the crown following the death of her husband.

Political offices
Preceded by The Lord FitzHugh	Chamberlain of the Household; 1425–1432	Succeeded by The Lord Bardolf
Preceded by The Lord Scrope of Masham	Treasurer of England; 1433–1443	Succeeded by The Lord Sudeley
Preceded by The Lord Saye and Sele	Chamberlain of the Household; 1450–1455	Succeeded by Thomas Stanley
Peerage of England
Preceded by Ralph de Cromwell	Baron Cromwell; 1417–1455	In abeyance Title next held by Maud Stanhope
