= Listed buildings in Hutton Bonville =

Hutton Bonville is a civil parish in the county of North Yorkshire, England. It contains three listed buildings that are recorded in the National Heritage List for England. All the listed buildings are designated at Grade II, the lowest of the three grades, which is applied to "buildings of national importance and special interest". The parish contains the village of Hutton Bonville and the surrounding area, and the listed buildings consist of the gate piers to a demolished house, a milepost and a church.

== Buildings ==
Name and location	Photograph	Date	Notes
Gate piers south of Hall Farm; 54.39678°N 1.48299°W		Late 18th century	The gate piers to The Hall, now demolished, are in stone with a cruciform plan, and are about 2 metres (6 ft 7 in) high. Each pier is rusticated on the front, and has a band, a frieze with paterae, a coved cornice, and a stepped domed top.
Milepost; 54.39308°N 1.44832°W		Late 19th century	The milepost is on the east side of the A167 road. It is in cast iron, and has a triangular plan, and a sloping top. On the top is the distance to London, on the left side is the distance to Darlington, and on the right side to Northallerton.
St Lawrence's Church; 54.39586°N 1.48301°W		1896	The church was virtually rebuilt, incorporating material from the 16th and 17th centuries. It is in stone with a stone slate roof, and consists of a nave, a north aisle, and a lower chancel. On the west gable is a gabled bellcote. The doorway has a round arch, most of the windows have two lights, and the east window has three lights with Perpendicular tracery, a chamfered pointed arch and a hood mould.
