= West Ashby =

Village and civil parish in the East Lindsey district of Lincolnshire, England

Coordinates: 53.233115°N 0.10549°W

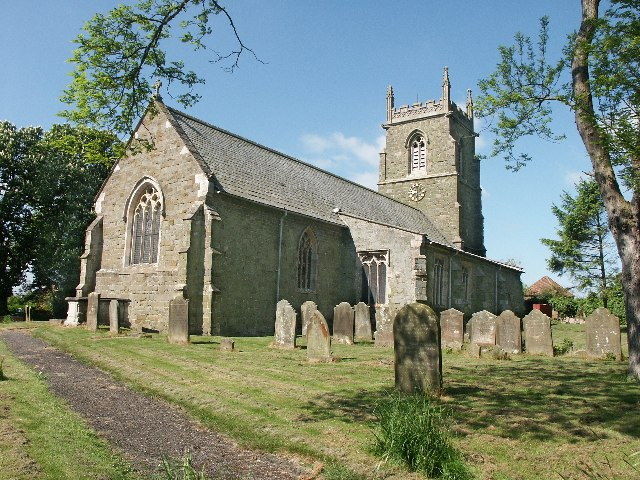
- All Saints' Church, West Ashby

- Location within Lincolnshire
- Population: 252 (2011)
- OS grid reference: TF265723
  - London: 120 mi (190 km) S
- Civil parish: West Ashby
- District: East Lindsey
- Shire county: Lincolnshire
- Region: East Midlands
- Country: England
- Sovereign state: United Kingdom
- Post town: HORNCASTLE
- Postcode district: LN9
- Dialling code: 01507
- Police: Lincolnshire
- Fire: Lincolnshire
- Ambulance: East Midlands
- UK Parliament: Louth and Horncastle

West Ashby is a village and civil parish in the East Lindsey district of Lincolnshire, England. It is situated on the Horncastle to Louth A153 road, and 2 miles (3.2 km) north from the centre of Horncastle. Farthorpe, Middlethorpe, and Furzehills are hamlets within the parish. According to the 2001 Census, and 2011 Census, West Ashby had a population of 252.

The name 'Ashby' derives from the Old Norse askr-by meaning 'ash tree farm/settlement'. The remains of a henge monument can be found just west of the village, off Docking Lane. Furze Hills is the site of the plague village of Northorpe.

All Saints parish church was extensively restored between 1848 and 1873.

Horncastle's golf club is located at West Ashby Country Park, where Shearman's Wath road crosses the River Bain.
