= Francis Crump =

- Born: 1711
- Died: 1800s
- Occupation: Silversmith

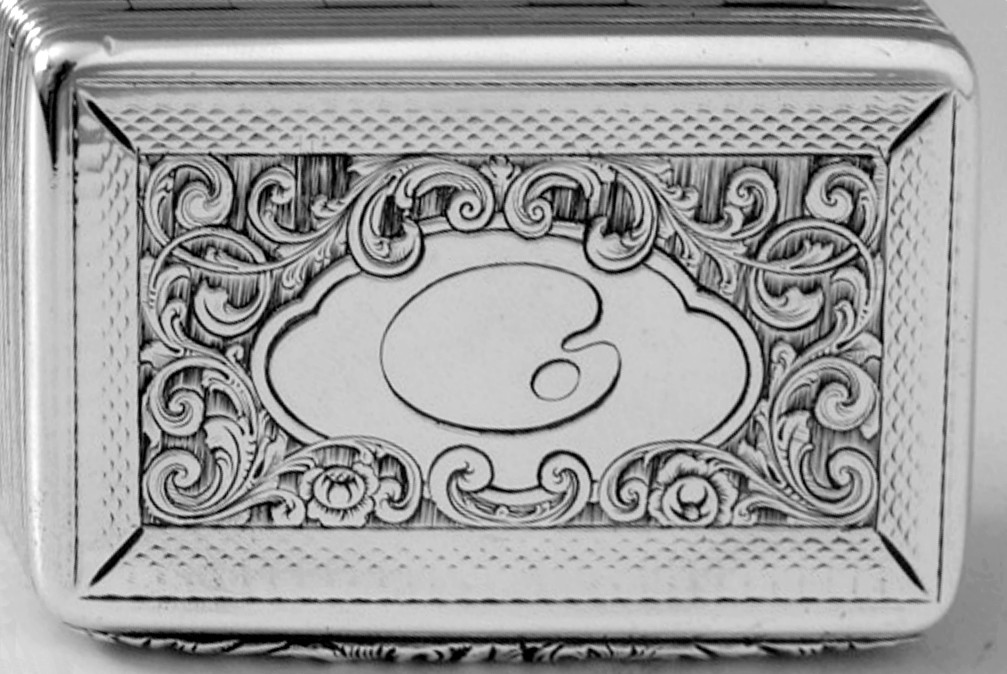
Victorian silver snuff box (1838)

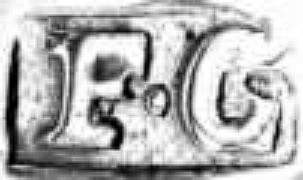
London maker's mark for Francis Crump, registered March 1756

Francis Crump (1711–1800s) was a London silversmith producing mostly hollowware. He was apprenticed to Gabriel Sleath (1674–1756), who objected to Huguenot goldsmiths working in England, and on 23 November 1753 entered into a partnership with him.

A marriage licence was issued on "19 May 1741 to Francis Crump of St. Foster's, City of London, silversmith, bachelor, 30, and Hester Dolling of the parish aforesaid, spinster, 21; at Compton."
