= Gabriel Sleath =

English silversmith and goldsmith (1674-1756)

- Born: c. 1674; Chipping Barnet, England, Kingdom of England
- Died: c. 24 March 1756 (aged c. 82); Chipping Barnet, England, Great Britain
- Occupation(s): gold- and silversmith

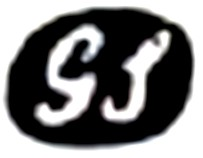

Georgian silver coffee pot by Gabriel Sleath (1731)

Gabriel Sleath (c. 1674 - c. 24 March 1756), the son of a tallow chandler, was a London gold- and silversmith and an outspoken critic of Huguenot goldsmiths' working in England.

Sleath was born and died in Barnet, London. In 1753, he entered into a partnership with Francis Crump, his former apprentice. He signed a petition in 1711 complaining of the competition of "necessitous strangers", and in 1716 against assaying work by foreigners who had not served seven years apprenticeship.

He was buried from St Vedast Foster Lane.
