= Asterby =

Hamlet in Lincolnshire, England

Coordinates: 53.29658700°N 0.10467522°W

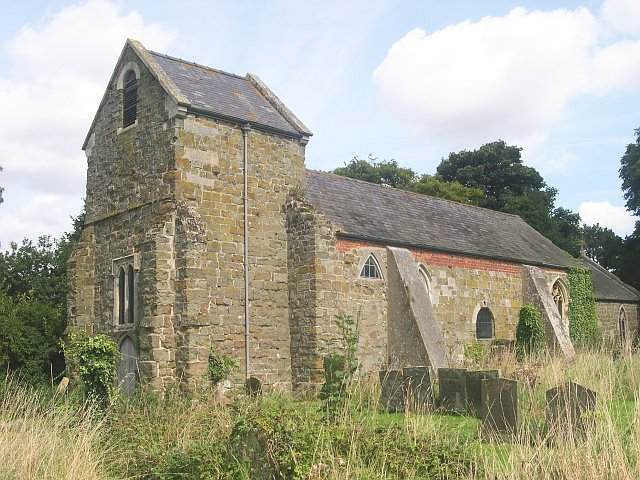
- St Peters Church, Asterby

- Location within Lincolnshire
- Population: 159 (2011)
- OS grid reference: TF264794
  - London: 120 mi (190 km) S
- District: East Lindsey
- Shire county: Lincolnshire
- Region: East Midlands
- Country: England
- Sovereign state: United Kingdom
- Post town: Louth
- Postcode district: LN11
- Police: Lincolnshire
- Fire: Lincolnshire
- Ambulance: East Midlands
- UK Parliament: Louth and Horncastle

Asterby is a hamlet between Goulceby and Scamblesby, west of Louth, in the East Lindsey district of Lincolnshire, England. The civil parish of Asterby had a population of 103 according to the 2001 census, increasing to 159 (including Stenigot) at the 2011 census.

Asterby is listed in the 1086 Domesday Book with 18 households and 120 acres (0.5 km^{2}) of meadow. Three human skeletons and a dagger were dug up in 1821 in a field near the church.

Asterby church, which was dedicated to St Peter, is no longer open to the public, having been sold into private ownership. The churchyard burial ground is open to the public, and is used for local burials. It dates from the 14th century, with alterations around 1900 by W. Mortimer and Son.
