= Market Stainton =

Village and civil parish in the East Lindsey district of Lincolnshire, England

Coordinates: 53.301358°N 0.158395°W

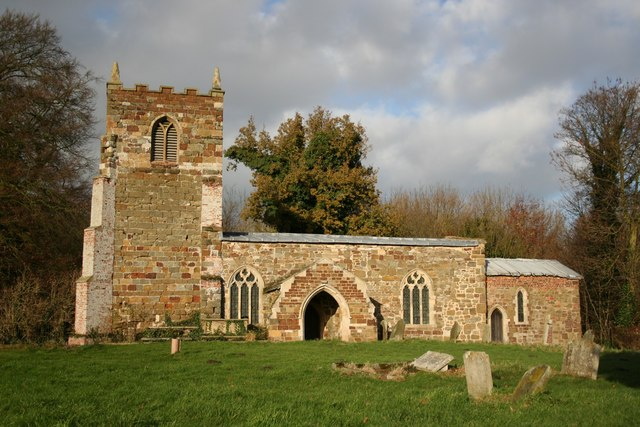
- St Michael's Church, Market Stainton

- Location within Lincolnshire
- Population: 139 (Including Ranby, Lincolnshire and Sotby. 2011)
- OS grid reference: TF228798
  - London: 125 mi (201 km) S
- District: East Lindsey
- Shire county: Lincolnshire
- Region: East Midlands
- Country: England
- Sovereign state: United Kingdom
- Post town: Market Rasen
- Postcode district: LN8
- Police: Lincolnshire
- Fire: Lincolnshire
- Ambulance: East Midlands
- UK Parliament: Louth and Horncastle

Market Stainton is a village and civil parish in the East Lindsey district of Lincolnshire, England. It is situated approximately 7 miles (11 km) north from the market town of Horncastle.

== History ==
A hoard of Roman coins was found in 1916, dated between CE 296 and CE 305. The coins are held in Grantham museum.

The village is listed in the 1086 Domesday Book as "Staintone", with 28 households, 80 acres (0.3 km^{2}) of meadow, and two mills.

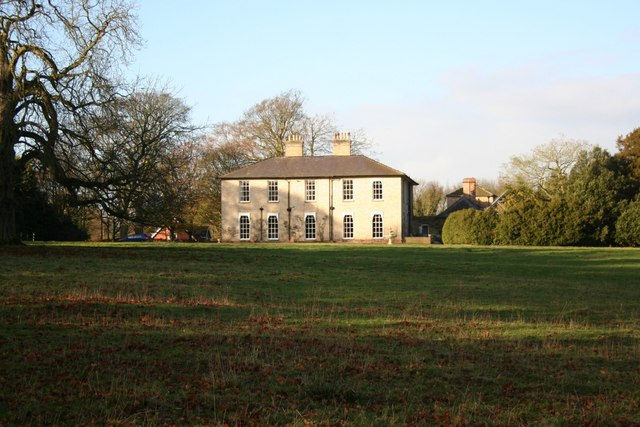
Market Stainton Hall

A Tumulus, Ranby Hoe, survived until the 19th century, when it was removed to permit ploughing – on 1924 Ordnance Survey maps it is shown as Beacon Hill.

The parish church, dating from the 13th century, is a Grade II listed building dedicated to St Michael, and built of greenstone, limestone and red brick. The church is now disused and it may be made redundant by the Diocese of Lincoln.

Market Stainton Hall is a Grade II listed brick-built country house. In 1872 there was a Wesleyan chapel.

From 1943 to 1948 the RAF operated an ammunition depot, RAF Market Stainton.

== Community ==
Market Stainton is a village of 35 residents, but has no amenities. Lincolnshire InterConnect buses provide local public transport.

The ecclesiastical parish is part of The Asterby Group of the Deanery of Horncastle. Services are held at St Mary's church at Horncastle, as St Michael's is in disrepair – there are plans to refurbish the building.
