= Goulceby =

Village and civil parish in the East Lindsey district of Lincolnshire, England

Coordinates: 53.298951°N 0.112821°W

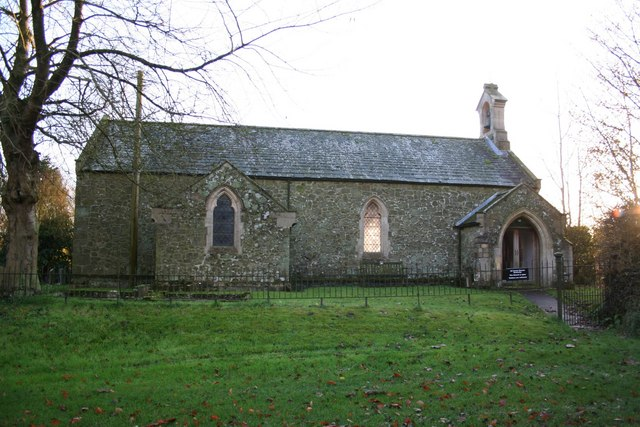
- Church of All Saints, Goulceby

- Location within Lincolnshire
- Population: 135 (2011)
- OS grid reference: TF258797
  - London: 120 mi (190 km) S
- District: East Lindsey
- Shire county: Lincolnshire
- Region: East Midlands
- Country: England
- Sovereign state: United Kingdom
- Post town: LOUTH
- Postcode district: LN11
- Police: Lincolnshire
- Fire: Lincolnshire
- Ambulance: East Midlands
- UK Parliament: Louth and Horncastle

Goulceby (/ˈɡɒlsbi/ GOLSS-bee) is a village and civil parish in the East Lindsey district of Lincolnshire, England. It is situated 7 miles (11 km) south-west from the market town of Louth, and lies in the Lincolnshire Wolds, an Area of Outstanding Natural Beauty.

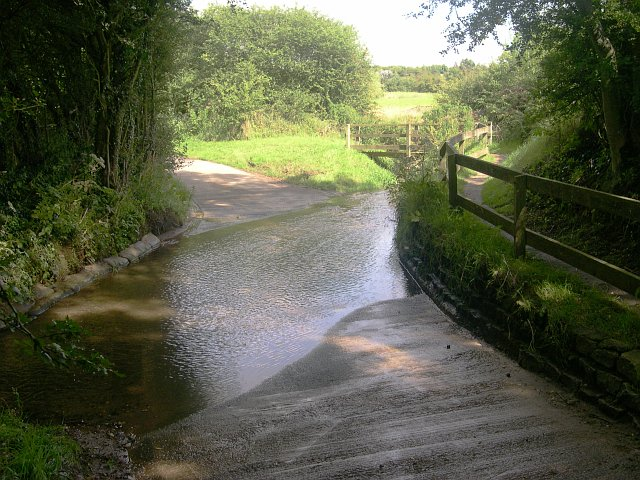
Goulceby Ford

Goulceby village is conjoined with the hamlet of Asterby, both marked on local road signs as one settlement, Goulceby with Asterby, although the two form separate civil parishes.

Goulceby was the birthplace of William Marwood, hangman, who invented the "long drop" system of execution.

== Community ==
Until 2012 local democracy took the form of the 'Asterby, Goulceby & Ranby Grouped Parish Council', but at the request of the people of Ranby, it was split to form the 'Asterby & Goulceby Parish Council' and the 'Ranby Parish Meeting'.

The Ecclesiastical parishes are also still separate, as Asterby, Goulceby and Ranby. All three are part of the Asterby group of the Deanery of Horncastle.
