= Tattershall Castle =

Castle in Tattershall, Lincolnshire, England

Coordinates: 53°6′4.8″N 0°11′33.4″W

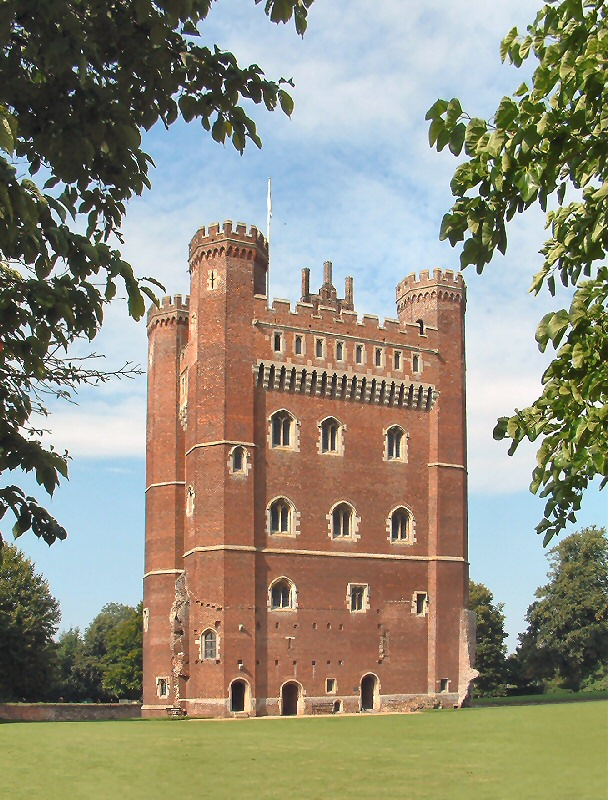
Great Tower of Tattershall Castle showing the three separate entrances

Tattershall Castle is a castle in Tattershall, Lincolnshire, England. Since 1925 it has been in the care of the National Trust.

== History ==
Tattershall Castle has its origins in either a stone castle or a fortified manor house, built by Robert de Tattershall in 1231. This was largely rebuilt in brick, and greatly expanded, by Ralph Cromwell, 3rd Baron Cromwell, Treasurer of England, in the 15th century. Tree ring dating indicates that construction was under way between 1406 and 1431.

Brick castles are less common in England than stone or earth and timber constructions; when brick was chosen as a building material it was often for its aesthetic appeal or because it was fashionable. The trend for using bricks was introduced by Flemish weavers. There was plenty of stone available nearby, but Cromwell chose to use brick. About 700,000 bricks were used to build the castle, which has been described as "the finest piece of medieval brick-work in England".

Of Lord Cromwell's castle, the 130 ft (40 m) high Great Tower and moat still remain. It is thought that the castle's three state rooms were once splendidly fitted out and the chambers were heated by immense Gothic fireplaces with decorated chimney pieces and tapestries. It has been said that the castle was an early domestic country mansion masquerading as a fortress. Cromwell died in 1456, and the castle was initially inherited by his niece, Joan Bouchier, but it was confiscated by the Crown after her husband's demise and remained in royal ownership from king Edward IV to king Henry VIII. Tattershall Castle was recovered in 1560 by Sir Henry Sidney, who sold it to Lord Clinton, later Earl of Lincoln, and it remained with the Earls of Lincoln until 1693. It passed to the Fortesques, but then fell into neglect.

It was put up for sale in 1910. Its greatest treasures, the huge medieval fireplaces, were still intact. When an American bought them they were ripped out and packaged up for shipping. Lord Curzon of Kedleston stepped in at the eleventh hour to buy the castle and was determined to get the fireplaces back. After a nationwide hunt they were found in London and returned. Curzon undertook restorations of the castle between 1911 and 1914, and was gifted to the National Trust, on his death, in 1925. It remains today one of the three most important surviving brick castles of the mid-15th century in the United Kingdom.

The experience of Tattershall led Curzon to push for heritage protection law in Britain; this was enacted as the Ancient Monuments Consolidation and Amendment Act 1913.

== Design ==
The plan of the castle is roughly rectangular; it is bounded by an inner moat surrounded by an outer moat. The inner enclosure, or Ward, was that of the original 13th-century castle, and the original entrance was on the north side towards the west end.

The Outer Ward, between the outer moat and inner moat, housed the stables. The Middle Ward, originally accessed by a bridge from the Outer Ward, housed a gatehouse and guardhouse. Today, access to the castle is via this Middle Ward. The Inner Moat encompasses the Inner Ward, where the Great Tower and the kitchens (now demolished) were situated.

=== The Great Tower ===
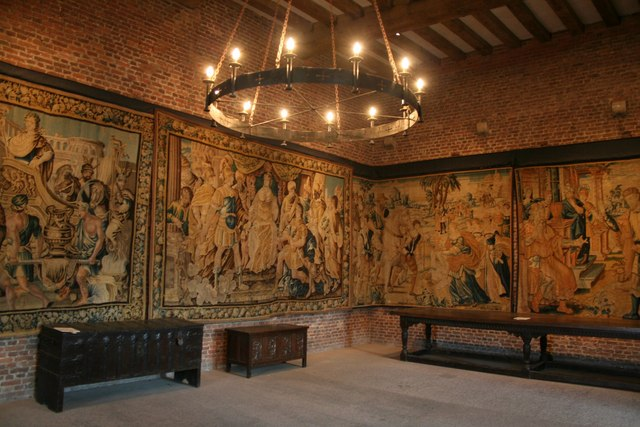
Interior of Tattershall Castle

The tower is about 66 feet (20 m) across. There are separate entrances to the basement, to the ground floor (Parlour), and to the spiral staircase leading to the upper floors of the tower. This suggests that the basement and ground floor were intended to provide communal accommodation, while the three great upper rooms were an independent private suite or solar. The design was extremely simple, with four floors, slightly increasing in size at each level by reductions in wall thickness. The fireplaces indicate that the rooms were not intended to be subdivided, but were kept as one great room at each level. One of the four corner turrets contains the staircase, but the other three provided extra accommodation rooms at each level.

The basement was used to store spices and other kitchen items. It is believed that during the Civil War it was used as a prison.

The ground floor was the Parlour and it was here that local tenants would come to pay their rent.

The first floor of the private suite was the Hall, which would have been used to entertain and wine and dine guests.

The second floor was the Audience Chamber, and only the finest of guests would have been admitted here. A brick vaulted corridor led to a small waiting room, before the great hall of the Audience Chamber, which today houses Flemish tapestries bought by Lord Curzon.

The third floor would have been the Private Chamber, where the Lord would have retired for the night.

Above these are the roof gallery and battlements, which provide good views across the Lincolnshire landscape, as far as Boston to the south, and Lincoln to the north. It is not possible today to access the turrets.

The brick foundations to the south of the great tower, projecting into the moat, mark the site of the 15th-century kitchens.

Today, the old guardhouse (about 330 feet (100 m) north-east of the tower) is the gift shop, and the grounds are home to a number of peacocks.

== The castle today ==
The castle is open to the public from 10:30 am every day, with last entry at 3.30 pm. The Parlour is licensed for civil wedding ceremonies for up to 80 guests.
