= Tattershall =

Village and civil parish in the East Lindsey district of Lincolnshire, England

Coordinates: 53.103980°N 0.190555°W

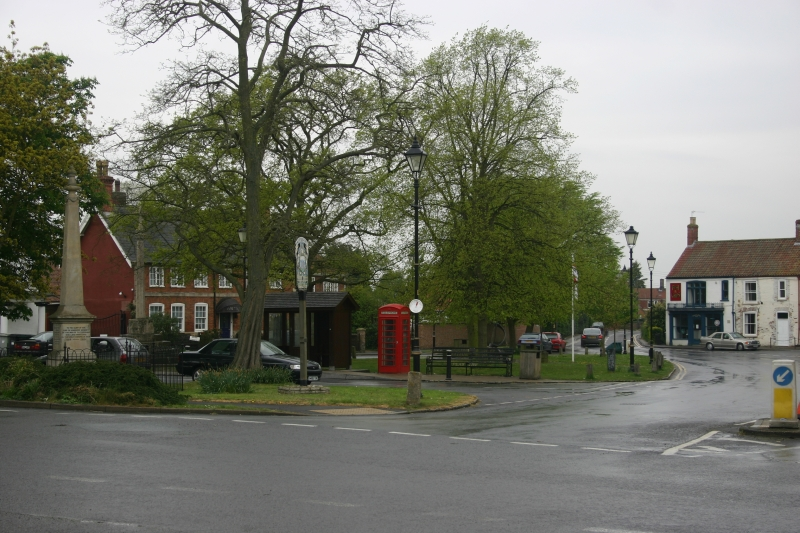
- Tattershall village

- Location within Lincolnshire
- Area: 6.91 km^{2} (2.67 sq mi)
- Population: 2,834 (Census 2011)
  - Density: 410/km^{2} (1,100/sq mi)
- OS grid reference: TF212578
  - London: 110 mi (180 km) S
- Civil parish: Tattershall
- District: East Lindsey
- Shire county: Lincolnshire
- Region: East Midlands
- Country: England
- Sovereign state: United Kingdom
- Post town: Lincoln
- Postcode district: LN4
- Police: Lincolnshire
- Fire: Lincolnshire
- Ambulance: East Midlands
- UK Parliament: Louth and Horncastle

Tattershall is a village and civil parish in the East Lindsey district of Lincolnshire, England. It is situated on the A153 Horncastle to Sleaford road, 1 mile (1.6 km) east from the point where that road crosses the River Witham at Tattershall Bridge. At its eastern end, Tattershall adjoins the town of Coningsby, with the two being separated by the River Bain and is 1 mile (1.6 km) south-east from the hamlet Tattershall Thorpe.

Tattershall has a history dating back to Roman times. Robert Eudo, in 1201, by means of a present of a well-trained goshawk, obtained from Richard II of England a grant to hold a weekly market here; and his son Robert obtained from Henry III of England a licence to build a castle here, together with a grant of free-warren in all his Demesne lands. Tattershall was a settlement listed in the Domesday Book of 1086, in the hundred of Horncastle and the county of Lincolnshire.

The 2011 census recorded a Tattershall civil parish population as 2,834, with the combined Tattershall and Coningsby area having a population of 6,698.

== Community ==
Local public houses are the Black Horse on the High Street and the Fortescue Arms in the Market Place. The Fortescue Arms dates from the 15th century and is a Grade II listed building. Barnes Wallis Academy (built 1954) is a secondary modern school on Butts Lane for pupils aged from 11 to 16. The school also serves Coningsby and Woodhall Spa.

The remaining wreckage of the Boeing 747-121 jet that was destroyed by a bomb, on 21 December 1988, over Lockerbie in Scotland is stored at a scrapyard near Tattershall. The remains include the aircraft's nose and flight deck.

Tattershall Carrs is a remnant of ancient alder woodland, with bat roosts made of converted bomb shelters.

== Landmarks ==
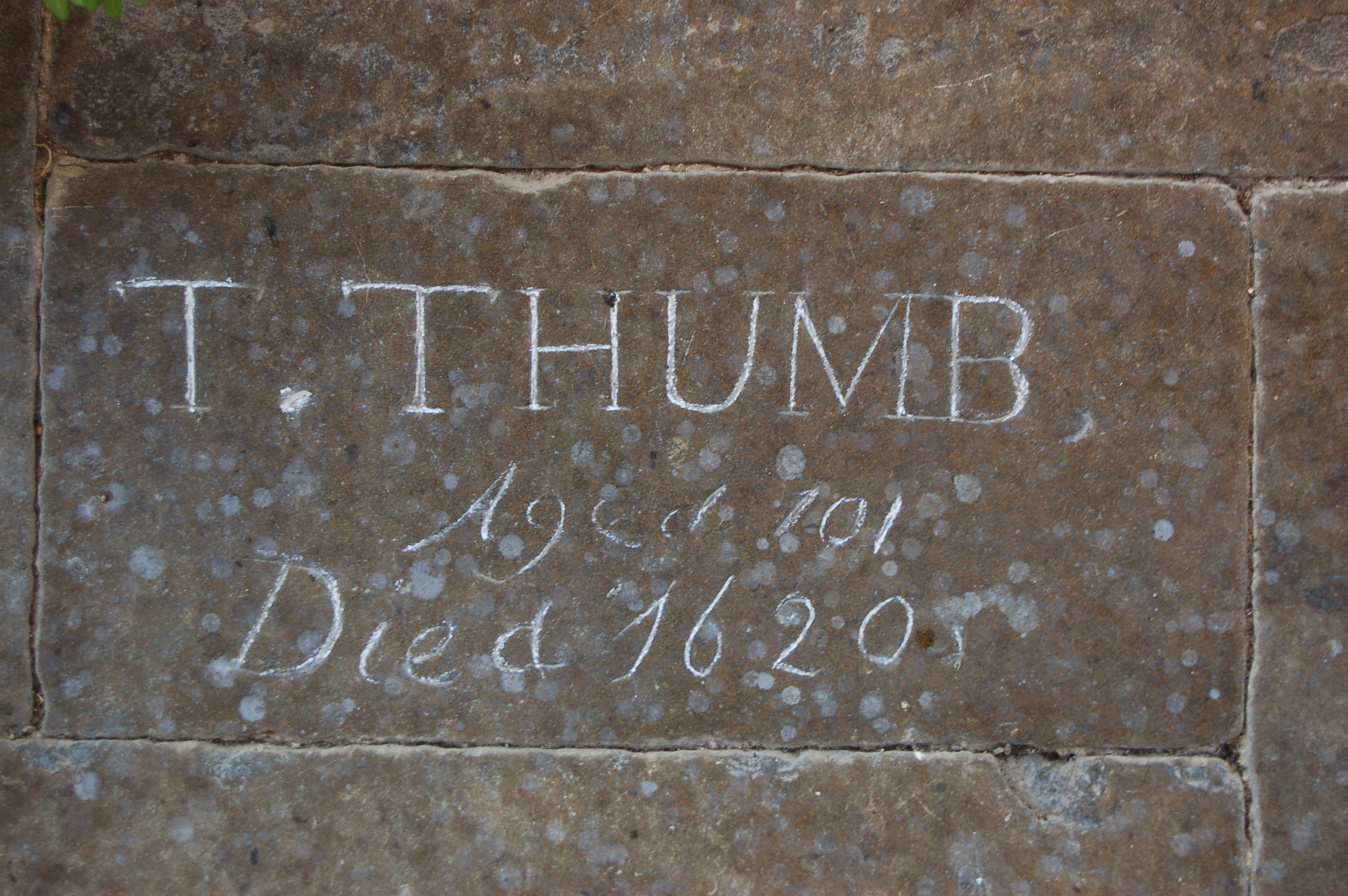
Grave of Tom Thumb

Village historic sites include the church of the Holy Trinity, a buttercross, Tattershall Castle, Collegiate College, and Tom Thumb's house and grave.

=== Tattershall Castle ===
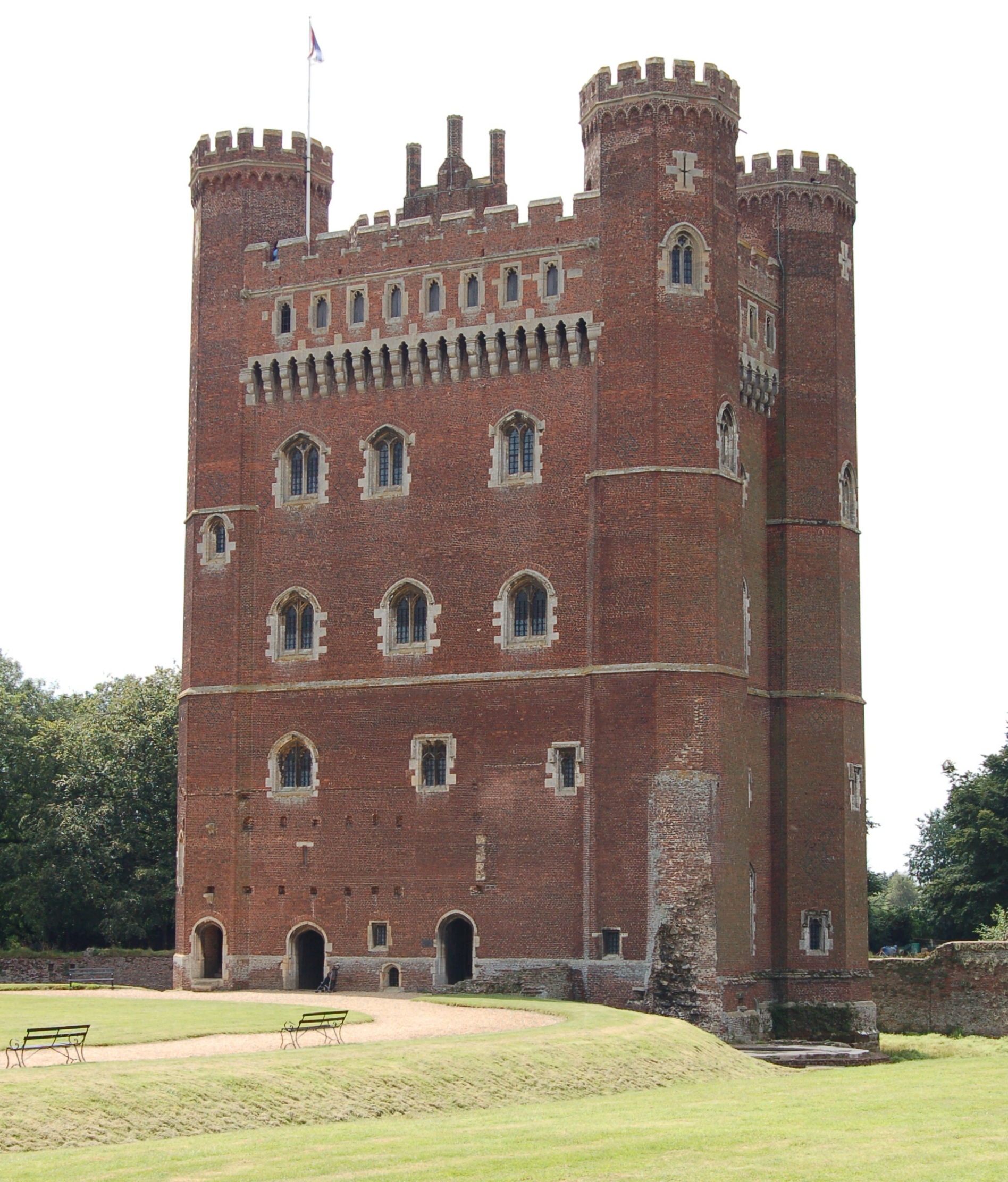
Tattershall Castle, the Grand Tower

Tattershall Castle was built in 1434 by Ralph de Cromwell, 3rd Baron Cromwell - Henry VI's Lord High Treasurer - on the site of an earlier 13th-century stone castle, of which some remains are extant, particularly the Grand Tower and moat.

=== Buttercross ===
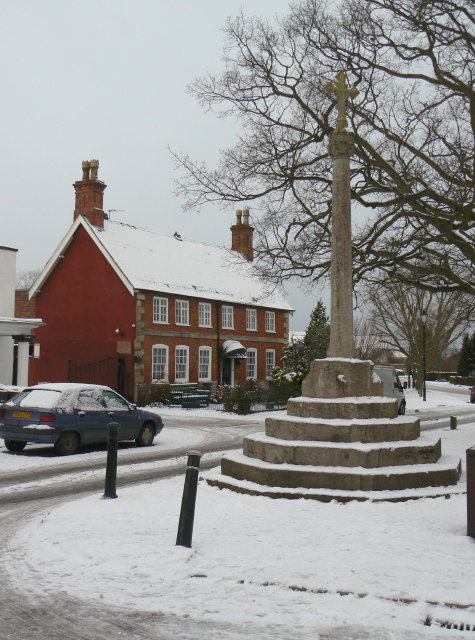
Tattershall Buttercross

An octagonal 15th-century buttercross stands in the Market Place. It is both a Grade I listed structure and an ancient scheduled monument. A charter to hold a weekly market was granted by King John in 1201 in return for an annual fee of a trained goshawk. Markets are no longer held but the buttercross remains at the centre of a shopping area.

=== Tattershall railway station ===
Tattershall railway station was a station on the line between Boston and Lincoln until closure. The Old Station House, a stationmaster's house and ticket office, is a Grade II listed building as is the former goods shed. The former railway line has been converted into a cycle path at a cost of £2 million. The path was officially opened in October 2008.

=== Holy Trinity Collegiate Church ===
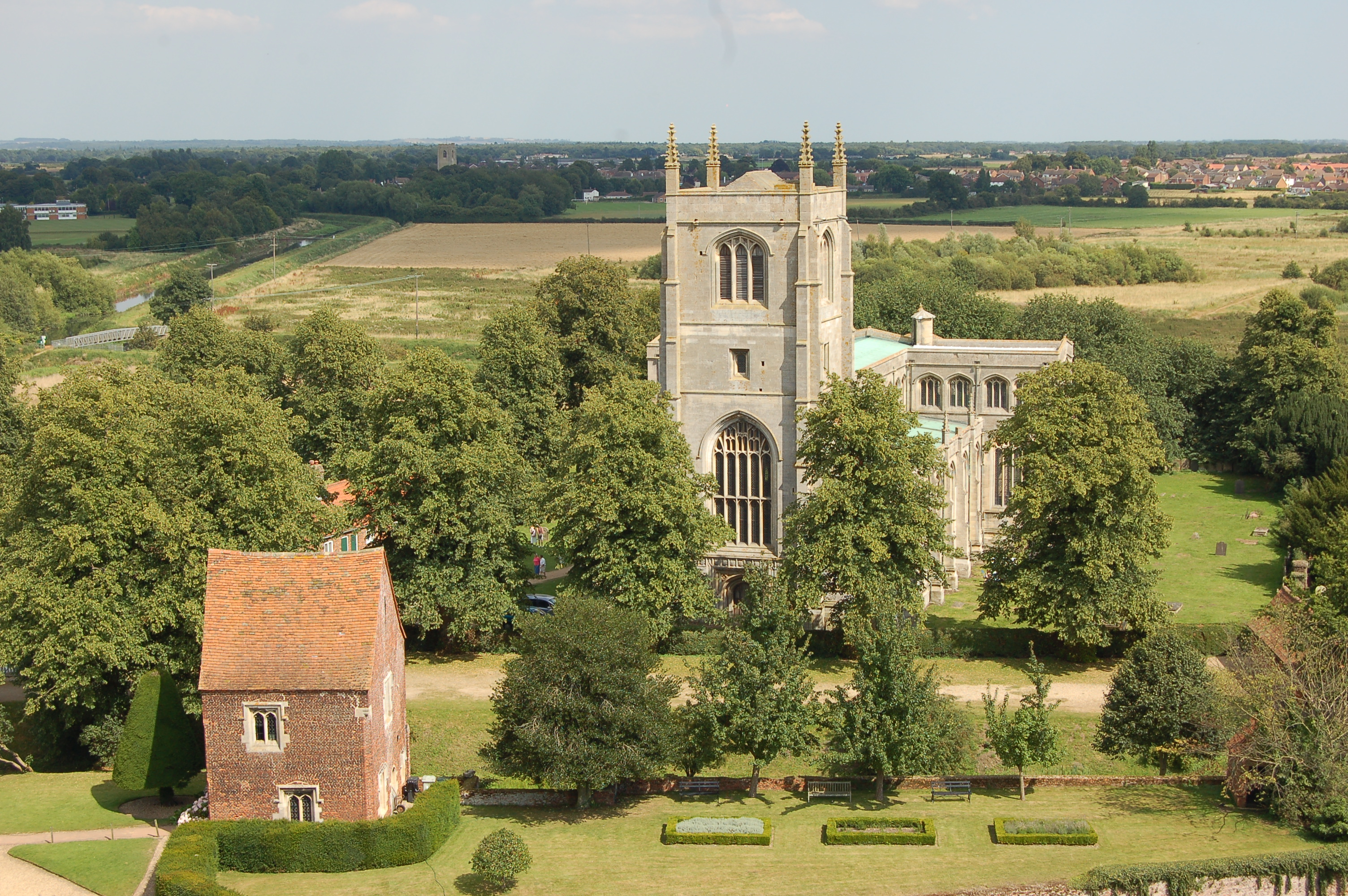
Holy Trinity Church

Adjacent to the castle is the Grade I listed Perpendicular-style Holy Trinity Collegiate Church, endowed by Ralph Cromwell, 3rd Baron Cromwell, but built after his death. It originally had a choir (which was seven priests, six lay clerks and six boy choristers). It received its charter from Henry VI in 1439 but building was not begun until 1472, reaching completion around 1500. The church has medieval stained glass, a collection of monumental brasses and an intact rood loft. It was restored between 1893 and 1897.

Near the font is a plaque marking the grave of the Tattershall resident Tom Thumb, reputedly 18.5 inches (47 cm) tall, who died in 1620 aged 101. Tom Thumb's small house can be seen on the roof of a larger house in the Market Place.

The churchyard contains a war grave of an officer of the Dorsetshire Regiment who died during the Second World War. Ralph Cromwell, founder of the church, is also buried here.

=== Tattershall College ===
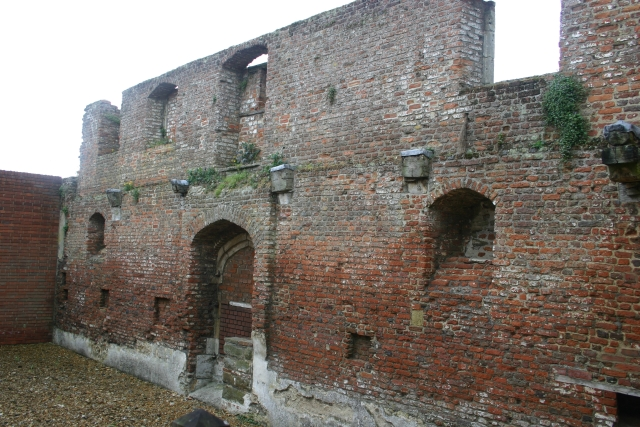
Ruins of Tattershall College

Adjacent to the Market Place are the remains of Tattershall College, which was built by Ralph Cromwell, 3rd Baron Cromwell for the education of the choristers of Holy Trinity Church. The college was an example of the Perpendicular style of Gothic architecture. In the late 18th century it was converted to a brewery, and later left empty – today it is a ruin. The walls that remain are supported by modern brick. Heritage Lincolnshire currently manages the site, which is Grade II* listed, and a scheduled ancient monument.

== Notable people ==
The current Lord of the manor of Tattershall is Julian Fellowes, actor, peer of the realm, screenwriter and youngest son of Peregrine Fellowes. The current Lady of the Manor, Emma Kitchener-Fellowes, is the great-great-niece of Lord Kitchener who was the adversary of Lord Curzon of Kedleston, the benefactor and restorer of Tattershall Castle. The most important English composer of the early 16th century, John Taverner, sang as a lay clerk at Holy Trinity Church in Tattershall for a time until he was appointed as informator choristarum at Cardinal College in 1526.

== See also ==
- Dogdyke Pumping Station
