= William Pool =

British inventor and whitesmith

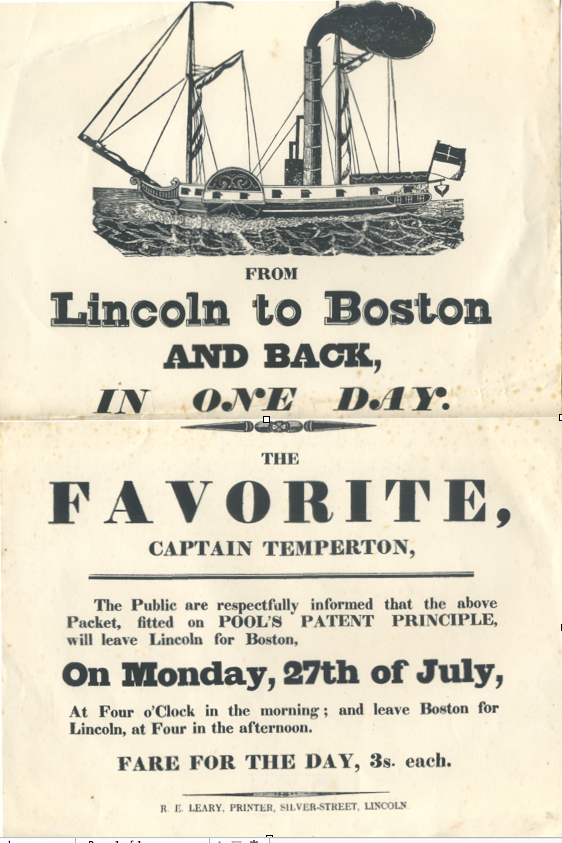
- Captain Temperton's Favorite Paddle Steamer with William Pool's Patent Principle Paddlewheels.
- Born: c. 1783; Thorne, South Yorkshire
- Died: 1856; Lincoln, England
- Spouse: Catherine Dobb
- Engineering career
- Discipline: Inventor and whitesmith
- Projects: Building an iron boat in 1820
- Significant design: Pool’s Patent Principle for ‘feathering’ paddle steamer wheels.

William Pool was an inventor and whitesmith who worked in Lincoln. He was most notable for building an iron boat in 1820 and Pool’s Patent Principle for feathering paddle steamer wheels, which he patented in 1829.

== Career ==
William Pool was born about 1783 at Thorne, Yorkshire, a shipbuilding port on the river Don. About 1812 Pool moved to Lincoln and married Catherine Dobb of Rotherham. Their second child was baptised at St Michael's on the Mount, when they were living at Hospital Gate or Christ's Hospital Terrace, just below Lincoln Cathedral. In this period he is known to have re-hung the Cathedral Bells and worked for Lord Monson, designing kitchen ranges and smoke jacks at Burton Hall near Lincoln. In 1820 he was to build an iron ship near the Pyewipe inn on the Fossdyke, which he successfully rowed.

With the increasing use of the River Witham as a route for transporting passengers between Lincoln and Boston there was demand for swifter transport between the two commercial centres. Pool came to know Henry Bell of Helensburgh and with his help, he worked on new designs for paddle steamers. In 1812 Bell built a steam powered paddle steamer called the PS Comet which was a development of William Symington's Charlotte Dundas which had been launched in 1803. The Charlotte Dundas had a stern paddle wheel, while Bell was placing paddle wheels on the sides of the vessel. It was this design of paddle steamer that William Pool was to develop.

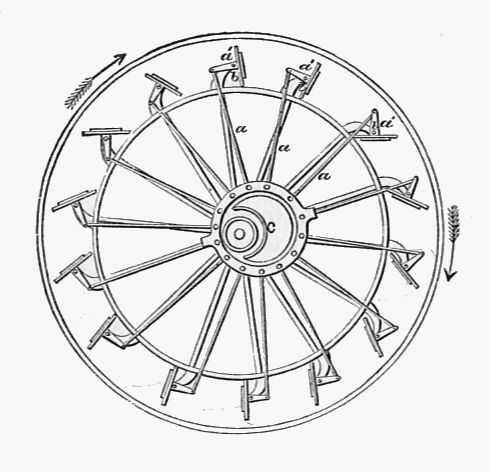
Diagram showing the working of a feathered paddle-wheel

He designed a feathered paddle wheel that would smoothly cut the water instead of the paddles "slapping" the water. Paddle steamers could virtually double their speed, reaching 7 to 8 miles per hour (11 to 13 km/h). In June and July 1829 his "Pool's Patent Principle" were fitted to Captain Temperton's steam packet The Favourite and the first voyage was made on the 27 July. A return journey from Lincoln to Boston could now be completed in one day.

On 16 September 1827 he was granted a patent by the Edinburgh Patent Office For certain improvements in machinery for propelling vessels and giving motion to mills and other machinery. His paddles were now fitted to other local paddle steamers such as the Countess of Warwick, The British Queen and the Celerity and there was widespread adoption of his design.

== Bibliography ==
- Obituary, Lincolnshire Chronicle.
