= Torksey Nunnery =

Nunnery in Lincolnshire, England

Torksey Nunnery was a nunnery in Torksey, Lincolnshire, England. It was founded at the south end of the town by the side of the Fossdyke. It housed a small community of Cistercian Nuns. Being appropriately dedicated to St Nicholas, the patron saint of sailors, it became known as the Priory of St Nicholas de Fossa, or the Fosse Nunnery.
