= Sincil Dike =

Stream in Lincolnshire, England

Coordinates: 53°13′35″N 0°32′17″W

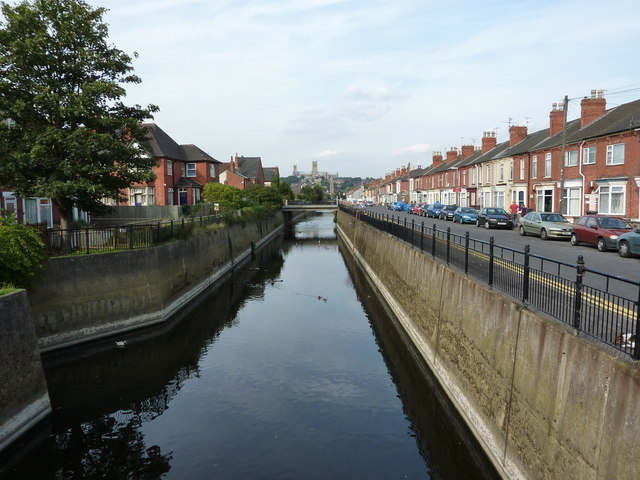
Sincil Dike in Lincoln

Sincil Dike also known as Sincil Dyke is a river in Lincolnshire, England.

== Course ==
The Sincil Dyke splits from the River Witham at Bargate Weir in Lincoln. It runs east for 1.5 miles (2.4 km), passing the west side of the Sincil Bank Stadium before flowing directly under the Lincoln railway station. The river then flows east, out of the city of Lincoln, running parallel to the River Witham as it passes Washingborough, and then rejoins the River Withham west of Bardney.

== History ==
The river used to rejoin the main channel at Stamp End in Lincoln, but was re-routed into the South Delph, a drainage ditch constructed by John Rennie in the early 19th century that joins the main channel below Bardney lock. The stream is known to have been used as a drainage channel in the mid-13th century and is thought to be pre-medieval or even Roman. Parts of it were culverted in 1847 to allow the construction of Lincoln Central railway station.
