= Listed buildings in Barnby in the Willows =

Barnby in the Willows is a civil parish in the Newark and Sherwood district of Nottinghamshire, England. The parish contains six listed buildings that are recorded in the National Heritage List for England. Of these, one is listed at Grade I, the highest of the three grades, and the others are at Grade II, the lowest grade. The parish contains the village of Barnby in the Willows and the surrounding countryside. The listed buildings consist of a church, a circular dovecote, a public house, a village hall and two houses.

== Key ==
Grade	Criteria
I	Buildings of exceptional interest, sometimes considered to be internationally important
II	Buildings of national importance and special interest

== Buildings ==
Name and location	Photograph	Date	Notes	Grade
All Saints' Church; 53.06007°N 0.71775°W		13th century	The church has been altered and extended through the centuries, and is built in stone with lead roofs, the body of the church rendered. It consists of a nave with a clerestory, north and south aisles, north and south porches, a chancel and a west tower. The tower has a single stage, a plinth with a string course, a two-light west window, and two-light bell openings. At the top is an embattled parapet with crocketed pinnacles. The north porch has a coped gable, crocketed pinnacles and gargoyles. There is unusual tracery in the chancel windows.	I
Dovecote; 53.06157°N 0.71899°W		Late 16th or early 17th century (probable)	The dovecote is in stone, with a course of brick under a conical tile roof. It is circular, 15 feet (4.6 m) high, and 63 feet (19 m) in circumference. On the northwest is a doorway, and under the eaves is a ledge, above which are pigeon holes. Inside there are nesting boxes in stone, brick and pantile.	II
School House; 53.06250°N 0.71688°W	—	Mid 18th century	A cottage in red brick with dentilled eaves, and a pantile roof with brick coped gables. There is a single storey and an attic, three bays, and a rear outshut. On the front is a trellis porch and a doorway with a plain surround. The windows are horizontally-sliding sashes, two with segmental heads on the front, and one in a gabled dormer.	II
Willow Tree Public House; 53.06279°N 0.72104°W		Mid 18th century	The public house is in red brick, partly painted, with a floor band, and a pantile roof with brick coped gables and kneelers. There is a single storey and an attic, and two bays, and a single-storey wing on the left. The central doorway has a plain surround, the windows are casements with segmental heads, and in the attic are two dormers with horizontally-sliding sashes.	II
Barnby House; 53.06243°N 0.71908°W		c. 1800	A house and a cottage combined into one house, it is in red brick with quoins, dentilled eaves, and a pantile roof with coped gables and kneelers. There are two storeys, and two doorways, the right one with an architrave and a flat canopy on brackets, and the left one with a plain surround. The windows are casements in the left part and sashes in the right part, the ground floor sash windows with segmental heads.	II
Jubilee School; 53.06257°N 0.71649°W		1850	The school, later a village hall, is in yellow brick with stone dressings, quoins and a slate roof, the gable end facing the street with decorative bargeboards and a finial. There is a single storey and three bays. On the front is a central gabled porch with plain bargeboards and a finial, and an arched opening with imposts, and a keystone. This is flanked by blind arched recesses with string courses, imposts and keystones, and above the porch is a segmental-headed casement window with imposts and a keystone.	II
