= Barnby in the Willows =

Village and civil parish in Nottinghamshire, England

Coordinates: 53.06°N 0.72°W

- Village and civil parish
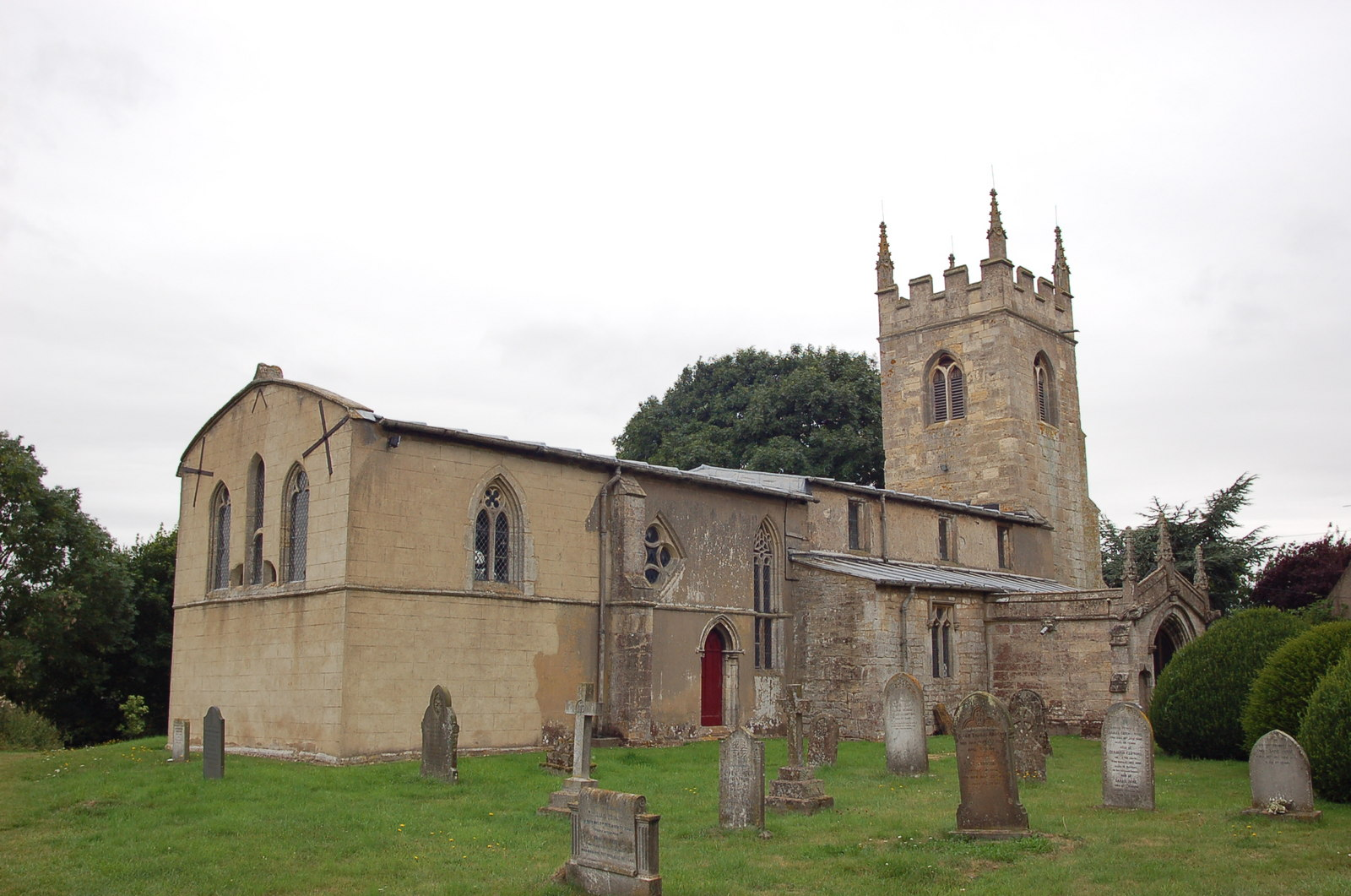
- All Saints' Church, Barnby in the Willows

- Location within Nottinghamshire
- Interactive map of Barnby in the Willows
- Area: 2.89 sq mi (7.5 km^{2})
- Population: 255 (2021)
  - Density: 88/sq mi (34/km^{2})
- OS grid reference: SK 8552
  - London: 110 mi (180 km) SSE
- District: Newark and Sherwood
- Shire county: Nottinghamshire
- Region: East Midlands
- Country: England
- Sovereign state: United Kingdom
- Post town: NEWARK
- Postcode district: NG24
- Dialling code: 01636
- Police: Nottinghamshire
- Fire: Nottinghamshire
- Ambulance: East Midlands
- UK Parliament: Newark
- Website: barnbyinthewillows.com

Barnby in the Willows is a village and civil parish in the Newark and Sherwood district of Nottinghamshire, England, just east of Newark-on-Trent. According to the 2001 census it had a population of 244, increasing to 272 at the 2011 census, with a reduction to 255 at the 2021 census. Just to the south of the village is the River Witham, which also forms the border with Lincolnshire here.

There are five streets composing Barnby: Front Street, Dark Lane, Cross Lane, Long Lane and Back Lane.

The parish church of All Saints consists of a chancel, nave and two aisles of the 13th century and a west tower which is 15th century. The altar rails are of the early 17th century.

== See also ==
- Listed buildings in Barnby in the Willows
