= Kirkstead Bridge =

Road bridge in Lincolnshire, England

Kirkstead Bridge is a concrete bridge in central Lincolnshire over the River Witham on the B1191.

== Position ==
The bridge carries Martin Dales Drove (B1191) over the River Witham into Woodhall Spa. Kirkstead, on the eastern side of the Witham, on the B1192, is now part of Woodhall Spa. The western side of the bridge is in Martin, Lincolnshire.

== History ==
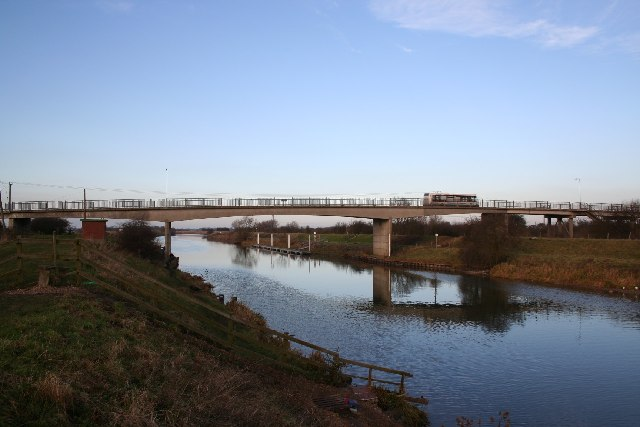
Kirkstead Bridge, looking north

The bridge was built in 1968. It replaced a former swing bridge.

=== Design ===
The bridge was built near the former Woodhall Junction railway station. The design was made by Lindsey County Council. The bridge has a central span of 114 ft, and two side spans of 71 ft. There are also fifteen viaduct spans of 47 ft. Overall the bridge is 961 ft long.

=== Construction ===
The contractor was A.Monk and Company. The precast concrete units of the bridge were made by Kingsbury Concrete of Bassetlaw, Nottinghamshire. The construction with precast concrete allowed overall costs to be lowered.
