= River Witham =

River in eastern England

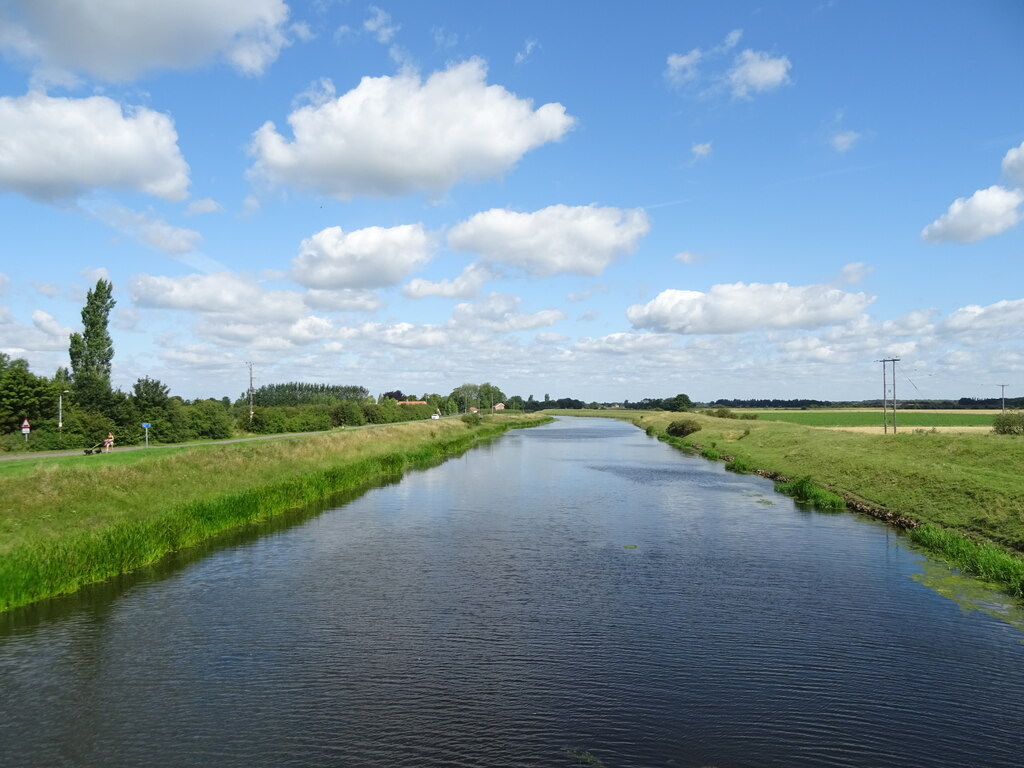
- A view of the river

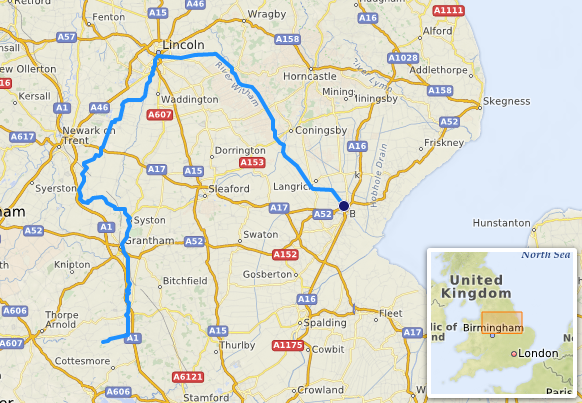
- Path of the River Witham

Location
- Country: United Kingdom
- Country within the UK: England
- Counties: Lincolnshire; Nottinghamshire; Leicestershire
- Cities: Lincoln
- Towns: Grantham, Boston

Physical characteristics
- Source
  - location: South Witham, Lincolnshire
  - coordinates: 52.755622°N 0.690858°W
  - elevation: 130 m (430 ft)
- Mouth
  - location: The Haven, Boston, Lincolnshire
  - coordinates: 52.964541°N 0.010042°W
  - elevation: 0 m (0 ft)
- Length: 132 km (82 mi)
- Basin size: 3,817 km^{2} (1,474 sq mi)
- Discharge
  - location: Claypole Mill
  - average: 1.86 m^{3}/s (66 cu ft/s)
  - maximum: 21.79 m^{3}/s (770 cu ft/s)
- Discharge
  - location: Colsterworth
  - average: 0.23 m^{3}/s (8.1 cu ft/s)

Basin features
- Tributaries
  - left: Foston Beck, Ease Drain, Shire Dyke, Fossdyke Navigation, Barlings Eau, Tupholme Beck, Bucknall Beck, Catchwater Drain, The Sewer, Engine Drain, Cut Dike, Newham Drain, Cowbridge Drain, Maud Foster, Hobhole Drain
  - right: Honington Beck, River Brant, Branston Delph, Middle Drain, Cathole Drain, Nocton Drain, Nocton Bankside Drain, Dunston Bankside Drain, Water Dike, Duns Dike, Metheringham Delph, Dales Drain, Blankney Town Drain, Black Horse Drain, Timberland Delph, Town Dike
- Progression : River Witham – The Haven – North Sea

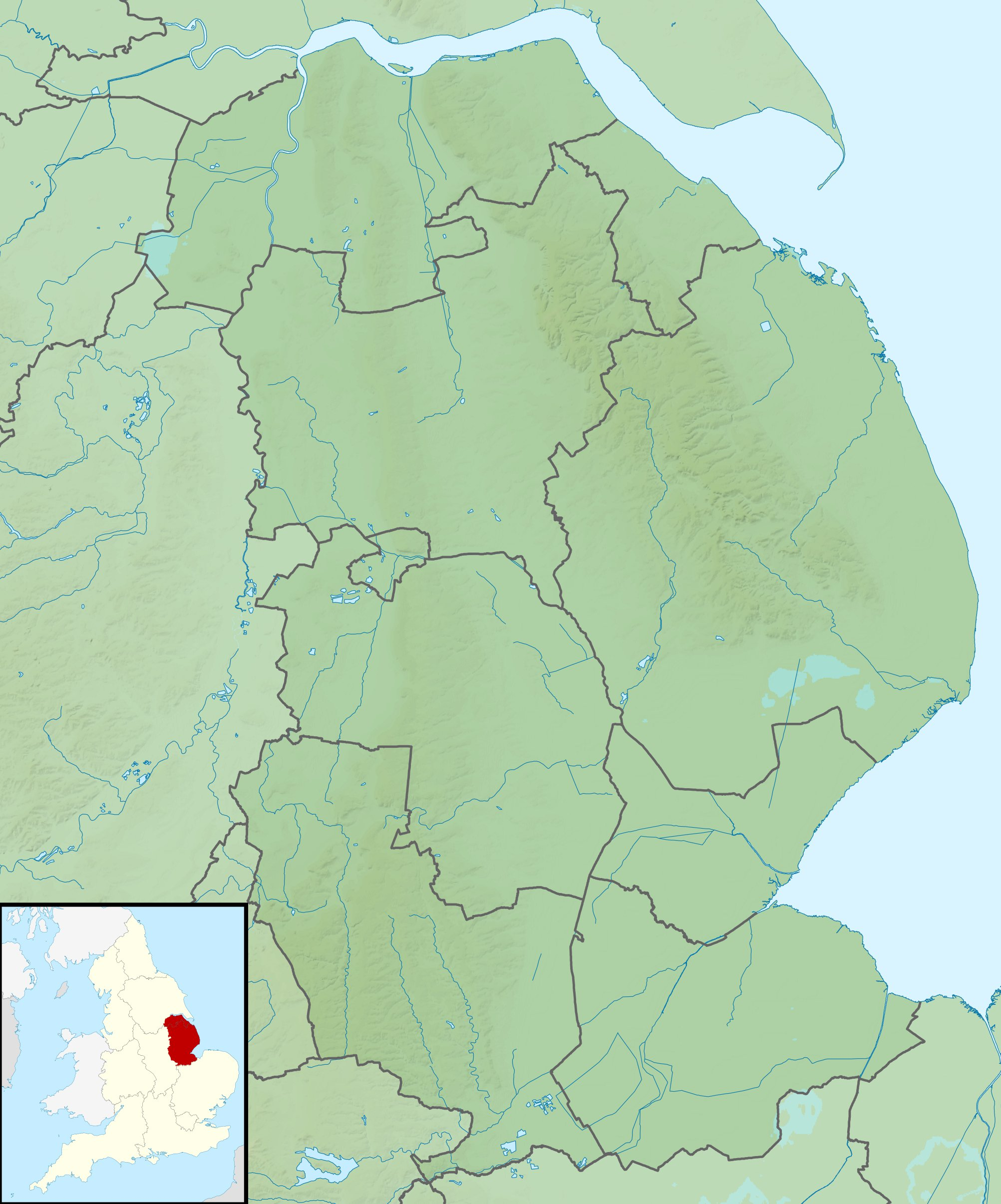
Map showing the course of the Witham and locations along its length

The River Witham is a river almost entirely in the county of Lincolnshire in eastern England. It rises south of Grantham close to South Witham at SK8818, passes through the centre of Grantham (where it may be closely followed using the Riverside Walk through Wyndham Park and Queen Elizabeth Park), passes Lincoln at SK9771 and at Boston, TF3244, flows into The Haven, a tidal arm of The Wash, near RSPB Frampton Marsh. The mouth of the river moved in 1014 following severe flooding, and Boston became important as a port.

Archaeological and documentary evidence shows the importance of the Witham as a navigable river from the Iron Age onwards. From Roman times it was navigable to the Brayford Pool in Lincoln, from where the Fossdyke was constructed to link it to the River Trent.

From 1142 onwards, sluices were constructed to prevent flooding by the sea, and this culminated in the Great Sluice, which was constructed in 1766. It maintained river levels above Boston, and helped to scour the channel below it. The land through which the lower river runs has been the subject of much land drainage, and many drains are connected to the Witham by flood doors, which block them off if river levels rise rapidly. The river is navigable from Brayford Pool in Lincoln to Boston. Its locks are at Lincoln, Bardney and the Grand/Great Sluice. Passage through the latter is restricted typically to 4-hour intervals during daylight when the tidal levels are suitable. The river provides access for boaters to the Witham Navigable Drains, to the north of Boston, and to the South Forty-Foot Drain to the south, which was reopened as part of the Fens Waterways Link, a project to link the river to the Nene flowing through the city of Peterborough.

The name "Witham" seems to be extremely old and of unknown origin.

== Route ==
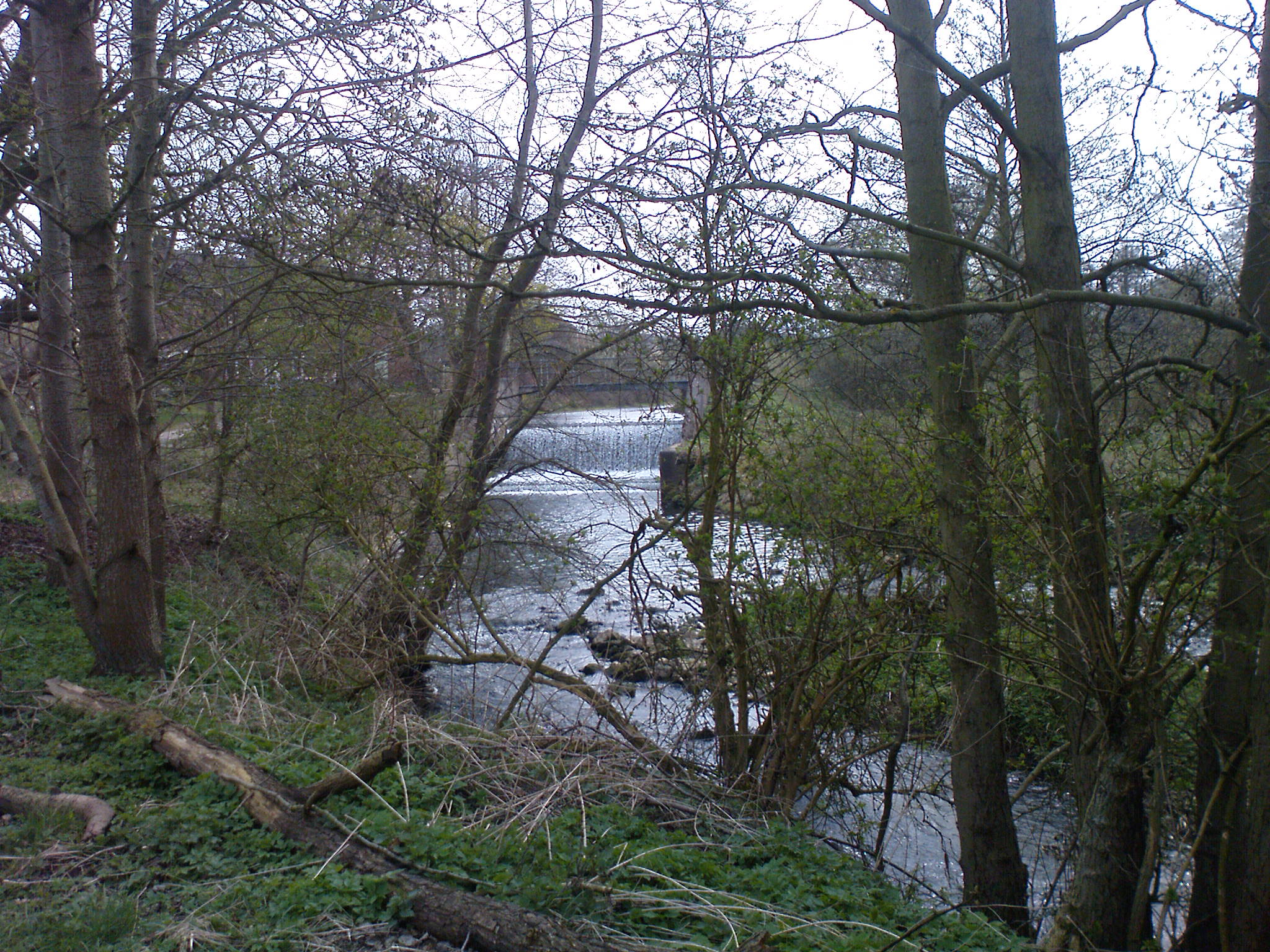
River Witham at Saltersford Bridge 1 mile south of Grantham. This part of the Witham is home to one of the last viable white clawed crayfish populations in the UK. (Credit: Mark A. O'Neill)

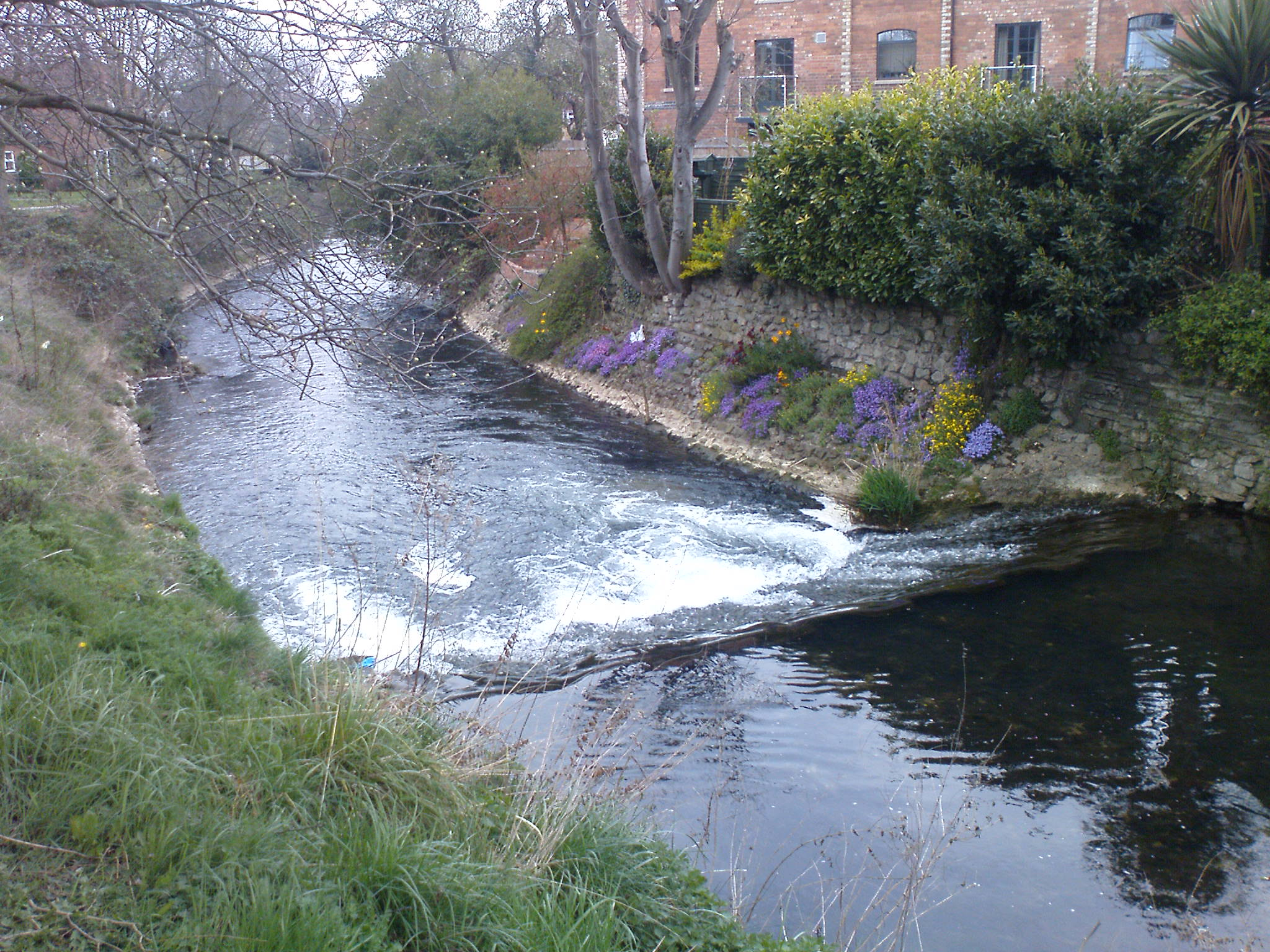
River Witham at New Somerby, Grantham

The Witham's course, which flows to the north and then to the south-east may be the result of glaciation (and possibly isostatic rebound) redirecting older rivers.

The source of the river is on high ground near South Witham, Lincolnshire, at around 340 feet (100 m) above ordnance datum (AOD). After briefly flowing to the east to reach South Witham, it flows generally north, passing through Colsterworth where it is crossed by the A1 road, which largely follows the line of the river to Newark on Trent. At Great Ponton, it is joined by the Cringle Brook on its left bank, and continues through Grantham, where it has already descended to 170 feet (52 m) AOD. After Barkston it turns to the west to pass through Marston. Foston Beck joins on the left bank, and at Long Bennington it resumes its northerly course. Beyond Claypole and near Barnby in the Willows it forms the border between Lincolnshire and Nottinghamshire for about 3 miles (4.8 km), before passing through an Army training area near Beckingham. The River Brant joins on the right bank, before it passes through North Hykeham to reach Lincoln, where it is only 16 feet (4.9 m) AOD.

The upper waters are important for agricultural water extraction, and for coarse fish such as roach, common bream and pike; small mammals like water voles, and native crayfish. The Ancaster Gap in the limestone scarp (see Lincolnshire Wolds) may represent an earlier course of the River Trent towards Boston, but is now occupied by the River Slea.

In Lincoln, the river flows into Brayford Pool and exits along a narrow channel that passes under the medieval High Bridge. The bridge not only restricts navigation due to its small size, but the volume of water that can pass through the gap is limited in times of flood. This is alleviated by the Sincil Dyke, which leaves the main channel at Bargate Weir and runs for 1.5 miles (2.4 km) through the industrial areas to the south of the main city centre. It used to rejoin the main channel at Stamp End, but was re-routed into the South Delph, a drainage ditch constructed by John Rennie in the early 19th century that joins the main channel below Bardney lock. The origins of the Sincil Dyke are unknown, but it is known to have been used as a drainage channel in the mid-13th century and is thought to be pre-medieval or even Roman. Parts of it were culverted in 1847 to allow the construction of Lincoln Central railway station.

From Lincoln, the river again turns first east, then south, making a cut, known as the Lincoln Gap, through a belt of upland. This section has also been suggested as a lower course of the Trent during and before periods of glaciation.

From Dogdyke near Coningsby to Boston, the north bank of the river was used by a section of the Great Northern Railway from Lincoln to Boston. A long-distance footpath, the Water Rail Way, follows the course of the river from Lincoln to Boston. The path uses sections of the river towpath and abandoned railway tracks, and has been opened in stages, with the final 2 miles (3.2 km) being completed in September 2008. The path is now part of Route 1 of the National Cycle Network and features a number of sculptures along its length, each commissioned from local artists. They include Lincoln longwool sheep at Stixwould, Lincoln Red cows at Washingborough, and Lincoln curly pigs, which became extinct in 1972, at Southrey.

== History ==
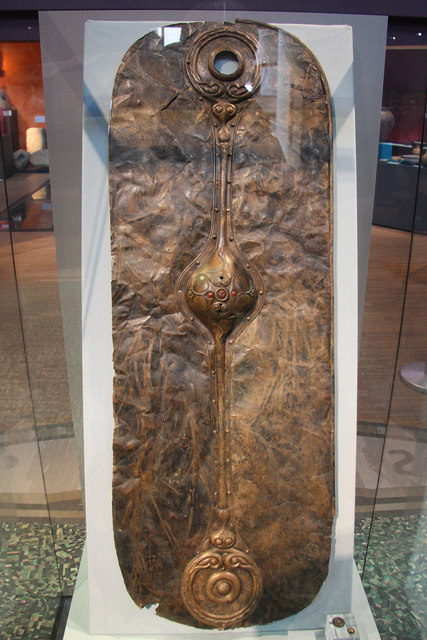
The Witham Shield, normally kept at the British Museum photographed during its visit to The Collection in 2013

The name "Witham" seems to be extremely old, apparently predating Anglo-Saxon, Roman, and even Celtic influence. The meaning is uncertain, although one possibility is Wye-om, meaning river plain, and the river has been known as the Witham since Saxon times. However, it was known as the Grant Avon in Ancient British times, meaning divine stream, and the fact that the main town on the upper river was Grant-ham may support this. John Leland writing in the 16th century noted that it was also called the Lindis, and others referred to it by that name. The present course may be a combination of two rivers, with the upper river originally emptying into Brayford Mere, to the west of Lincoln, and draining along the course of the Fossdyke, while the Langworth River emptied into another mere to the east of Lincoln, located between Washingborough and Chapel Hill. From there, the water flowed along a tidal creek to reach the sea. There was a ridge of high ground between the two meres, and the Romans cut a channel through it as part of some drainage works.

Archaeological evidence points to river navigation as far back as the Iron Age. Artefacts such as the Iron Age Witham Shield, found in the river near Washingborough in 1826, and the Fiskerton Boat, a log boat found near Fiskerton during flood defence work in 2001 have been recovered and are on display at the British Museum in London or The Collection in Lincoln.

The Witham was an important navigation in Roman times. Lincoln (Lindum)—the meeting point of Ermine Street, joining London to York, and Fosse Way, leading to Leicester and Bath—was an important Roman fort that became one of only four colonia in Britain. Most important Roman cities were situated near navigable water, which enabled goods to be transported in bulk, but Lincoln did not possess this advantage, and so the Romans constructed the Fossdyke from Lincoln to Torksey on the River Trent, improved the River Witham from Lincoln to The Wash, and built the Car Dyke from Lincoln to the River Cam near Cambridge. The Witham thus gave Lincoln access to the east coast, while the Fossdyke gave access to the Trent and further on to the Humber.

There have been claims that the Witham was originally tidal up to Lincoln, but that seems unlikely. Prior to the construction of the Grand Sluice, the lower river was affected by tides, but the highest they normally reached was Dogdyke or Chapel Hill, and Lincoln is considerably higher than these locations, by some 5 to 7 feet (1.5 to 2.1 m). Wheeler argues that it "would not have been possible for the tide to flow up to Lincoln," given the present geological conditions.

Trading continued throughout the medieval period evidenced by the importance of Torksey, which was then a flourishing town, now only a small village. However, the Fossdyke needed much maintenance to keep it clear of silt. Henry I had overseen the scouring of its channel, and there were inquiries in 1335, 1365 and 1518 to consider the state of the Fossdyke and to compel the inhabitants of the region to maintain it. Lincoln was a centre for the collection of business taxes, but this came at the cost of maintaining the waterways, and having finally decided it was too large a cost, James I presented the Fossdyke to the City of Lincoln.

The Witham originally flowed into The Wash at Bicker Haven, where the port of Drayton was established in the Welland estuary, and it was only as a result of massive flooding in 1014 that it diverted itself to flow into The Haven at Boston. This gave rise to the growth of Boston as a port in the 12th and 13th centuries, exporting wool and salt to the Hanseatic League, though Boston only received its charter in 1545.

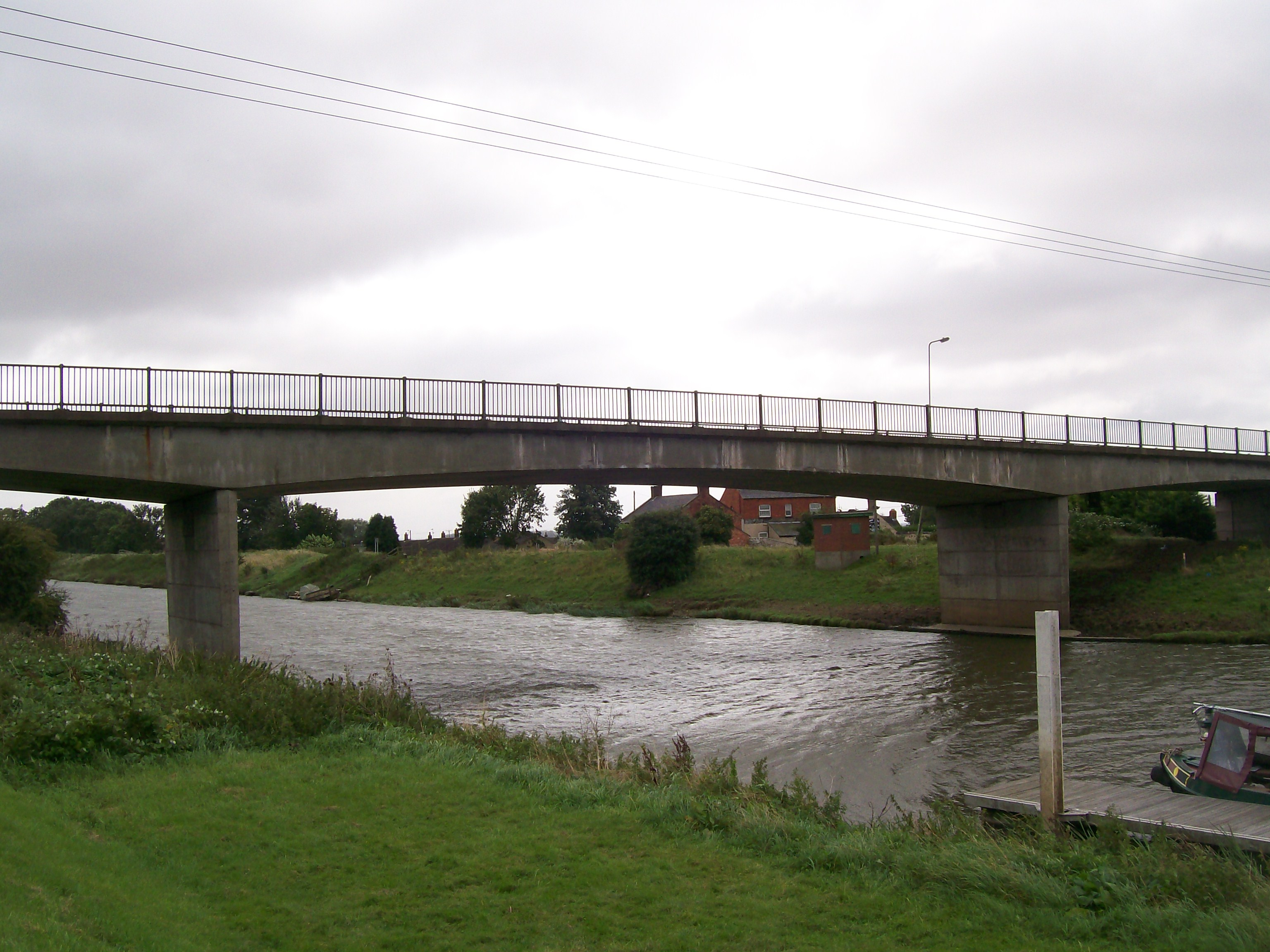
Kirkstead Bridge (B1191 road)

The river was affected by silting which restricted trade despite the construction of various sluices and barriers from 1142 onwards, when the first sluice was built below Boston. Other sluices were erected at Boston in 1500 and at Langrick in 1543, but navigation was again difficult on both the river and the Fossdyke by 1660. In 1671 an Act of Parliament was obtained for the improvement of the Navigation. In 1743, John Grundy, Sr. and his son John Grundy, Jr. were commissioned to produce a detailed survey of the river. They produced an engraved map in 1743 and a printed report, running to 48 pages, in the following year. The main recommendation was a 7-mile (11 km) new cut to eliminate the "prodigious meandering course" of the channel above Boston. Although the estimated cost of £16,200 dissuaded the landowners from taking action at the time, the report formed the basis for improvements in the 1760s.

=== Canalisation ===
Following meetings of Landowners held in 1752 and 1753, they asked John Grundy Jr, as his father had died in 1748, to re-evaluate his plans from 1744 and consider a plan for a "Grand Sluice" that had been produced by Daniel Coppin in 1745. Grundy suggested that the 1744 cut should be extended by a further 2 miles (3.2 km) into Boston, and that the sluice could then be built on the extension. The landowners moved the location of the sluice nearer to Boston, but otherwise approved his report, although no action was taken. John Grundy was again consulted in 1757, and Langley Edwards of King's Lynn was asked to review the positioning of the sluice in 1760. The landowners then asked John Smeaton to liaise with Grundy and Edwards, and the three engineers produced a joint report in 1761, with estimates of £38,000 for drainage works and £7,400 for improvements to navigation. The report was approved, although a meeting held in January 1762 decided that the new cut should revert to the alignment suggested by Grundy in 1753. The location of the Grand Sluice would be as suggested by Edwards in 1760. Grundy produced another engraved map, and parliamentary approval for the works was obtained in June 1762.

Once the Act of Parliament was obtained, Edwards became the engineer for the project, and drew up the detailed plans, which Grundy and Smeaton checked and altered slightly, after which they had no further involvement with the scheme. Construction was started in April 1763, and the drainage element of the project, which included the sluice, was finished in 1768, having cost £42,000. Work on three locks and other work connected with navigation cost £6,000 and continued until 1771. The locks were located at Stamp End, Kirkstead and Barlings. The Grand Sluice was a major construction which maintained the height of water above Boston to near normal high tide level and had massive flood gates to cope with any tides above this. It was completed in 1766 and was effective in scouring the Haven below it and increasing silting of the river above it.

The 1762 act created the Witham Navigation Commissioners and the Witham Drainage General Commissioners, who continued to promote drainage schemes actively, creating a drainage network known as the Witham Navigable Drains that transformed much of northern Lincolnshire from fen to farming land. Today many of these channels are managed by the Witham First, Third and Fourth District Internal Drainage Boards and Upper Witham Internal Drainage Board. These four internal drainage boards reduce the flood risk to the surrounding properties, land and environment.

In 1791, as part of the campaign to promote the construction of the Horncastle Canal, the Commissioners of the River Witham asked the engineer William Jessop to assess the state of the Fossdyke Navigation and the Witham, with particular reference to the problems of navigating through Lincoln, where the channel was restricted by a medieval bridge. He proposed two solutions; the first avoided the route through the city entirely, by utilising the course of the Sincil Dyke to the south, while the second involved lowering the bottom of the channel through the Glory Hole bridge, which was only 18 inches (46 cm) deep at normal water levels. The Commissioners had imposed a toll on all traffic passing under the bridge, but decided that a channel bypassing the city would have grave financial consequences. They opted for improving the existing channel and the work to remove the wooden floor, to lower the river bed under the bridge and to underpin its foundations was completed in 1795. The Commissioners dropped the collection of tolls at the bridge, but the amount they received from traffic passing through the locks increased as the volume of traffic grew in response to the easier passage through the bridge.

=== The Grand Sluice ===
When completed in 1766, Edwards' Grand Sluice consisted of three channels each 17 feet (5.2 m) wide, fitted with pointed gates on both sides, and a lock adjacent to the north bank, which could be used as an additional flood relief channel if required. The lock was originally very small, but was lengthened to its current 41 by 12 feet (12.5 by 3.7 m) in 1881. The pointed doors on the non-tidal side of the sluice were replaced by steel guillotine gates between 1979 and 1982.

=== Improvements ===
The state of the Witham had deteriorated by 1802, and the Commissioners asked John Rennie for advice. He stated that the Kirkstead lock was badly placed, and the associated staunch was in danger of collapse. He recommended that it be demolished and rebuilt elsewhere, and also suggested that access to Boston should be through the Witham Navigable Drains, rather than the Grand Sluice, or that a new cut should be built to the south of the sluice, to rejoin the river at Boston Harbour. In 1803, he suggested that High Bridge at Lincoln should be demolished and rebuilt. Four years later, he suggested that the locks at Kirkstead and Barlings should be removed, and replaced by one near Washingborough church. The Commissioners petitioned parliament in 1808, and a new Act of Parliament authorised the work, to be carried out by a company of proprietors. They could borrow £30,000 for the drainage element of the scheme and £70,000 for the navigation element. Two new locks were built, one at Stamp End and the other at Bardney, which replaced the original locks. A new channel was cut near Fiskerton, upstream of Bardney, and the plan for a lock at Washingborough was dropped. While Stamp End lock was being rebuilt, an alternative route was provided, utilising the Sincil Dyke and the South Delph. Rennie recorded that Branston Delph, Carlton Dike, Nocton Delph and Timberland Dike were navigable at the time. The proprietors obtained three more Acts of Parliament, in 1812, 1826 and 1829, all with the main aim of allowing more capital to be raised.

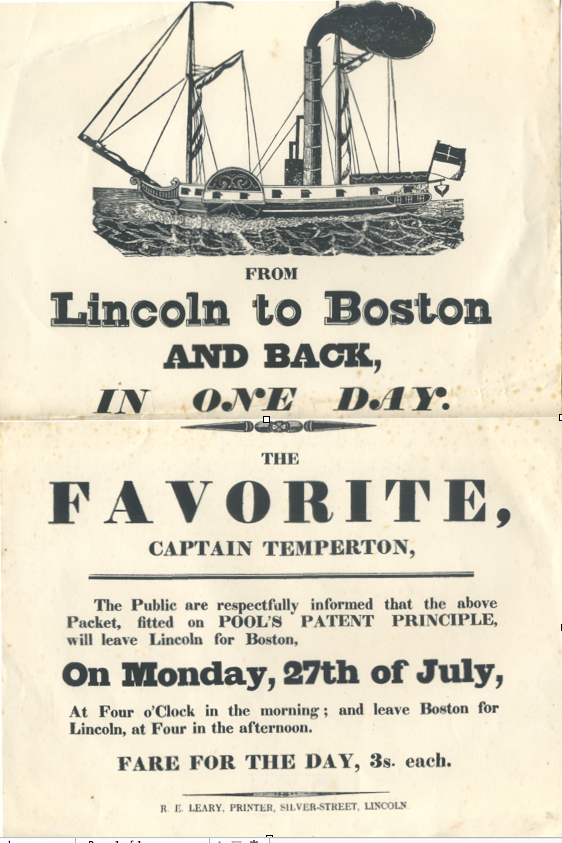
Poster for the Favorite Paddle Steamer between Lincoln and Boston, July 1829

Tolls on the Witham had gradually risen as improvements had been made. £263 was raised in 1763–4, and had reached £898 by 1790. In 1819, income exceeded £4,100 for the six months from March to September, and a five per cent dividend was paid in the following year. By 1826, over £180,000 had been spent on improvements, and another £40,000 was needed. However, the proprietors were still optimistic, and commissioned Sir John Rennie to investigate an extension to link the Witham to the River Ancholme, but although he made two proposals, neither was implemented. Most traffic was carried by sailing vessels or in barges hauled by horses, but in March 1816, the first steam packet boat arrived on the river. It was named Witham and had been built by Shuttleworth and Robinson, whose yard was on Sincil Dyke. Despite a boiler explosion in March 1817, fortunately without causing injury to any of the crew or the 30 passengers, a second steam packet was operating by July 1817, and they soon displaced the sailing packet boats. During a flood in 1828, one of them lost power when a floating hedge became jammed in the paddle wheels. In the following year, a Lincoln man, William Pool invented a new type of paddlewheel, which resulted in the boats travelling faster, and in 1836, wooden vessels were superseded by iron packet boats.

Railways reached Lincoln in August 1848, 15 years after the first proposal. The Wakefield, Lincoln and Boston Railway hoped to build railways in the area, and negotiated with the proprietors and those of the Fosdyke. Under the arrangement, they would take over both navigations, and guarantee a fixed income for the proprietors. They would then merge with the London and York Railway. Both proposals had been absorbed into the Great Northern Railway (GNR) by the time an Act of Parliament was obtained, but the original agreement was retained, and the GNR leased the Witham for 999 years for a payment of £10,545 per year to the proprietors. This figure represented the average profits for the previous three years, plus five per cent. The railway company also agreed to pay the interest on mortgages amounting to £24,692 which the proprietors held, but had redeemed them by 1857. The railway from Lincoln to Boston ran along the eastern bank of the river, and opened on 17 October 1848.

Most of the stations were located near to the landing stages which the steam packets used, and the railway did all it could to draw passengers away from the river. This included the provision of fourth-class carriages, with fares set at a halfpenny per mile, in 1850, and by 1863, the steam packet boats had ceased operation. Freight traffic also declined, with coal passing through the Grand Sluice dropping from 19,535 tons in 1847 to 3,780 tons in 1857. Nevertheless, the railway company had to maintain the river, and in 1871, spent £5,000 on making Bardney lock deeper by 5 feet (1.5 m) at the request of the drainage commissioners. The GNR leased the navigation to the Great Northern and Great Eastern Joint Committee in 1882, and in 1897, by which time the Manchester, Sheffield and Lincolnshire Railway had become the Great Central Railway, they built a large warehouse beside Brayford Pool, with a transhipment dock next to it. Total traffic on the river had fallen to 18,548 tons in 1905, and averaged 5,870 tons during the years of the First World War, mainly general merchandise and agricultural produce. With the nationalisation of the waterways following the Second World War, the navigation eventually became the responsibility of British Waterways as a result of the Transport Act 1962, and since 2 July 2012 has been managed by the Canal & River Trust.

== Current navigation ==
Today, commercial traffic, apart from tour boats, has ceased above the port of Boston (The Haven) and only pleasure craft carry on through the lock at the Grand Sluice into the Witham. Although the lock is only 41 feet (12 m) long, it is possible for longer boats to pass through it at certain states of the tide. Unlike many such sea locks, the reverse-facing gates close on every tide, as the normal high tide water level is higher than the level of the river, while at low tides there is insufficient water in the Haven to allow exit from the lock. Passage is therefore restricted to a brief period approximately two hours before or after high water. It is still possible to navigate many of the drains in small vessels, and a new lock, completed in December 2008, provides entry to the South Forty-Foot Drain from below the Grand Sluice so that vessels will be able to reach the Fens without venturing out to the Wash, as part of the Fens Waterways Link.

The Witham is navigable from Brayford Wharf in Lincoln to Boston. There are two locks between Boston and Lincoln – one at Bardney and the other in Lincoln itself, the Stamp End Lock which is unusually a guillotine lock. The main obstruction to navigation is the High Bridge or Glory Hole in Lincoln, a medieval structure which is only about 15 feet (4.6 m) wide and 8.5 feet (2.6 m) high at normal river levels. In times of flood it is unnavigable. The bridge spans the river for 87 feet (27 m), and consists of an arch built in c1160, with extensions added in 1235, 1540 to 1550 and 1762/3. It is the only British bridge which still has secular medieval buildings standing on it, and is believed to be the second oldest masonry arch bridge in the country. It is currently a Scheduled Ancient Monument and a Grade I Listed Building.

There are traffic lights on the short section between Brayford Pool and Stamp End Lock, which are used to indicate the state of the river in times of flood. Green indicates that flows are low or normal, and boats can proceed along this stretch. Red indicates that flows are high and that great care is required. Flashing red indicates that flows are very high and boats must not use the section.

=== Connecting waterways ===
There are a number of drains that connect to the River Witham and that are protected by flood doors. These consist of a single pair of mitre gates that are designed to close if the level in the river rises above the level in the drain. Several of these are navigable to the more adventurous boater. The river is also joined by the Kyme Eau, which connects to the Sleaford Navigation on which navigation will eventually be restored to Sleaford. At Antons Gowt, a lock drops down into the Witham Navigable Drains, a system of drainage ditches which are used to prevent flooding of the fens to the north of Boston. Since November 2008 there has been an active campaign by the Billinghay Skirth Regeneration Society to restore navigation on the River Skirth, and the project has won the support of Billinghay and other parish councils, the Inland Waterways Association, the Environment Agency, Lincolnshire County Council and the Lincolnshire Waterways Partnership.

== Water quality ==
The Environment Agency measure the water quality of the river systems in England. Each is given an overall ecological status, which may be one of five levels: high, good, moderate, poor and bad. There are several components that are used to determine this, including biological status, which looks at the quantity and varieties of invertebrates, angiosperms and fish. Chemical status, which compares the concentrations of various chemicals against known safe concentrations, is rated good or fail.

The water quality of the River Witham system was as follows in 2019.

Section	Ecological Status	Chemical Status	Length	Catchment	Channel
Witham – headwaters to conf Cringle Bk	Poor	Fail	13.3 miles (21.4 km)	24.38 square miles (63.1 km^{2})	
Witham – conf Cringle Bk to conf Brant	Moderate	Fail	35.4 miles (57.0 km)	60.50 square miles (156.7 km^{2})	heavily modified
Witham – conf Brant to conf Catchwater Drain	Moderate	Fail	4.1 miles (6.6 km)	6.90 square miles (17.9 km^{2})	heavily modified
Conf Catchwater Drain to conf Bain	Moderate	Fail	33.3 miles (53.6 km)	76.83 square miles (199.0 km^{2})	heavily modified
Lower Witham	Moderate	Fail	10.8 miles (17.4 km)	0.66 square miles (1.7 km^{2})	heavily modified
Witham	Bad	Fail			heavily modified

The reasons for the quality being less than good include sewage discharge affecting most of the river, physical modification of the channel for land drainage, and run-off from agricultural and rural land. Like most rivers in the UK, the chemical status changed from good to fail in 2019, due to the presence of polybrominated diphenyl ethers (PBDE), perfluorooctane sulphonate (PFOS) and mercury compounds, none of which had previously been included in the assessment.

In March 2018, the river suffered the worst incidence of pollution ever recorded in Lincolnshire, when Omex Agriculture released ammonia into the water. It resulted in over 100,000 fish dying between Bardney and the Wash, for which the company was given a remediation notice as defined by the Environmental Damage (Prevention and Remediation) Regulations 2015. They must carry out a range of improvements to the river to ensure that its habitat is restored. Once the ammonia had been flushed out, 1.5 million fish larvae and 70,000 roach and bream were released into the river. The remediation notice was only the second to be issued since the legislation was introduced.

== Points of interest ==
Point	Coordinates (Links to map resources)	OS Grid Ref	Notes
Source	52.7608°N 0.6914°W	SK884189	
South Witham bridge	52.7660°N 0.6275°W	SK927195	
A1 bridge, Colsterworth	52.8181°N 0.6235°W	SK928254	
A52 bridge, Grantham	52.9041°N 0.6317°W	SK921349	
Railway bridge, Barkston	52.9716°N 0.6309°W	SK920424	
Long Bennington bridge	52.9716°N 0.6309°W	SK920424	
A17 bridge, Beckingham	53.0764°N 0.6967°W	SK874540	
Haddington bridge	53.1545°N 0.6278°W	SK918628	
Jn with River Brant	53.1627°N 0.5769°W	SK952637	
Brayford Pool	53.2281°N 0.5438°W	SK973711	
Stamp End Lock, Lincoln	53.2280°N 0.5296°W	SK982711	
Bardney Lock	53.2164°N 0.3483°W	TF103700	
Jn with Horncastle Canal	53.0832°N 0.1967°W	TF208555	canal derelict
Jn with Sleaford Navigation	53.0695°N 0.1961°W	TF209539	
Jn with Witham Navigable Drains	53.0081°N 0.0641°W	TF299473	
Grand Sluice	52.9818°N 0.0306°W	TF323445	Start of The Haven
Jn with The Wash	52.9322°N 0.0768°E	TF396392	

Brayford Pool and River Witham, the navigable route from Lincoln to Boston
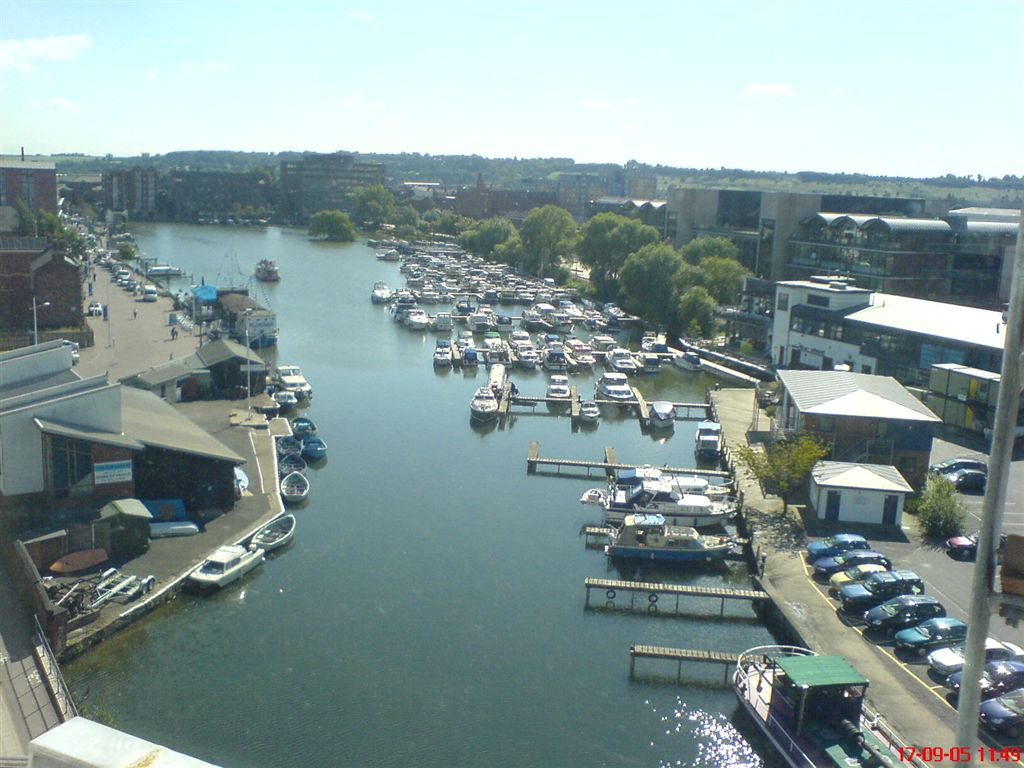
Brayford Pool: The junction of the navigable Witham with the Fossdyke

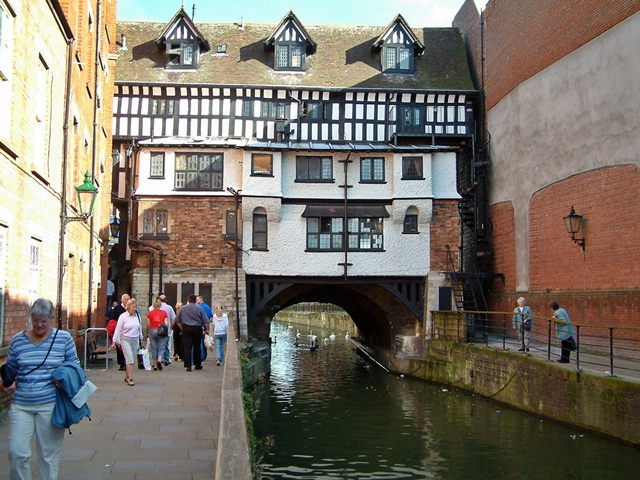
The medieval High Bridge in Lincoln, whose restricted air draft gives it the name The Glory Hole.

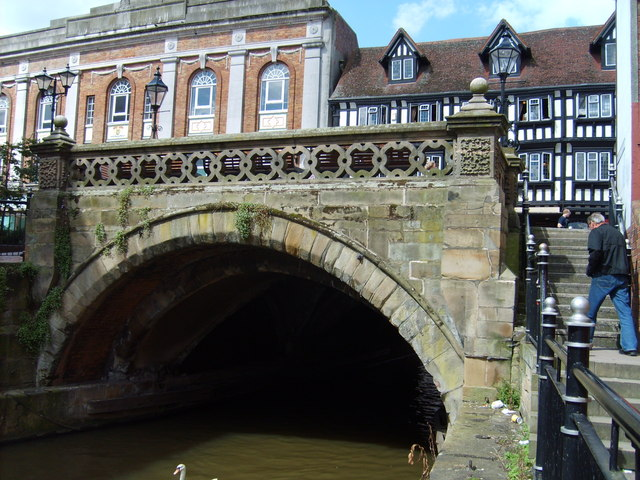
The downstream portal of the Glory Hole.

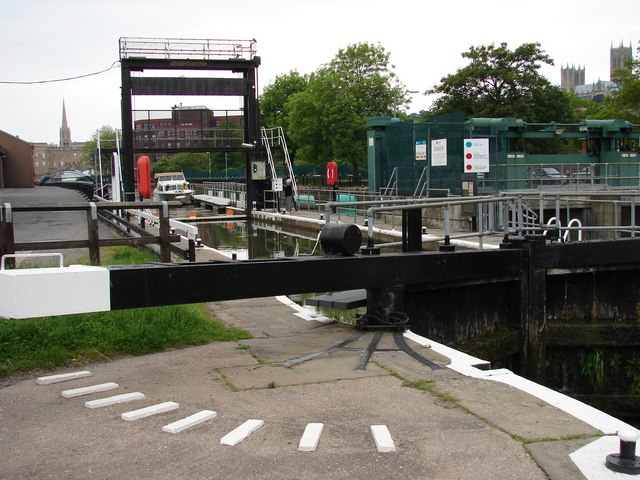
Stamp End Lock in Lincoln has a narrower gauge relative to Bardney Lock below.

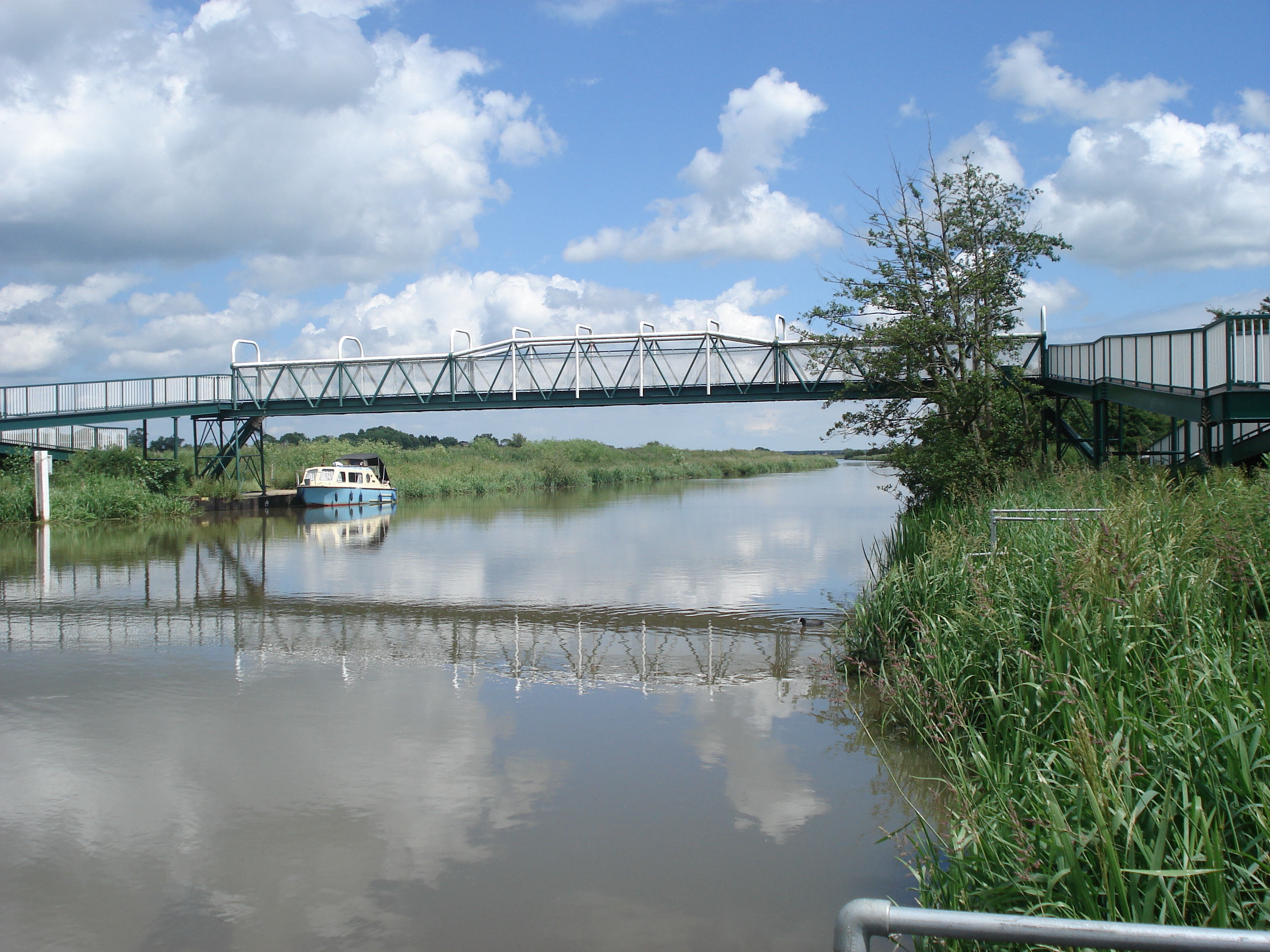
Five Mile Bridge, by Fiskerton

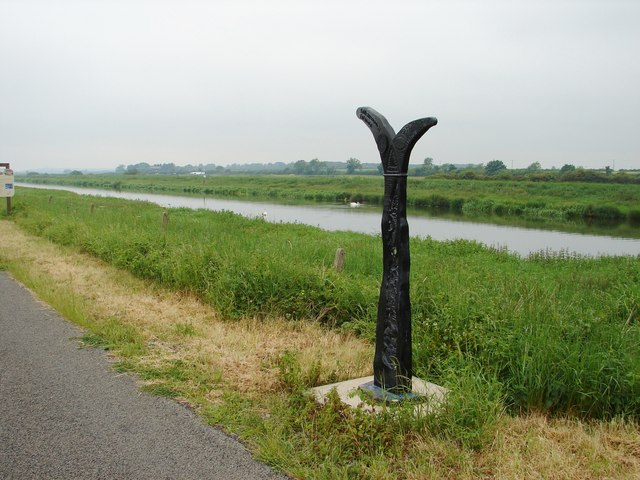
Sustrans signpost on long distance cyclepath next to Witham, once the main railway line

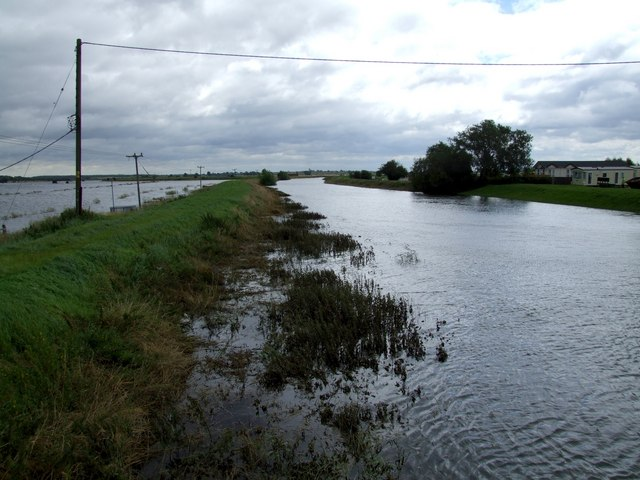
Flooding at Short Ferry on the old course, July 2007

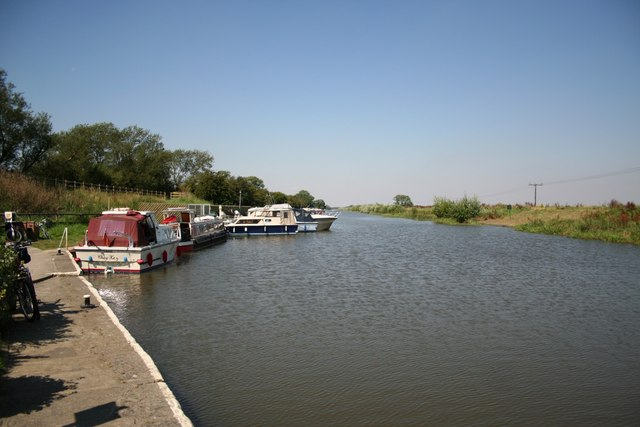
Moorings on the River Witham by Bardney Lock

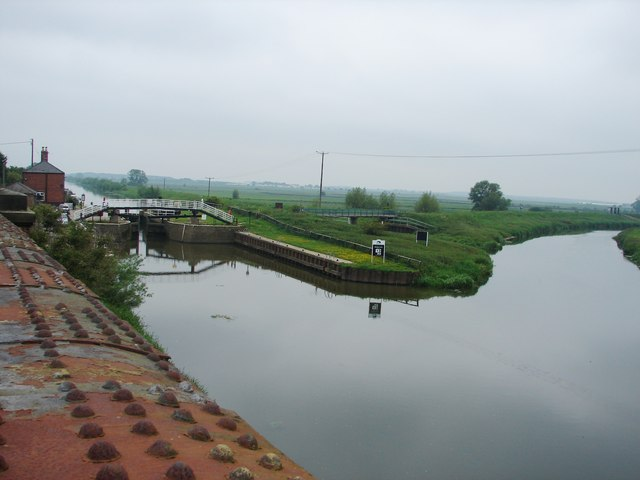
Both courses of the river at Bardney Lock

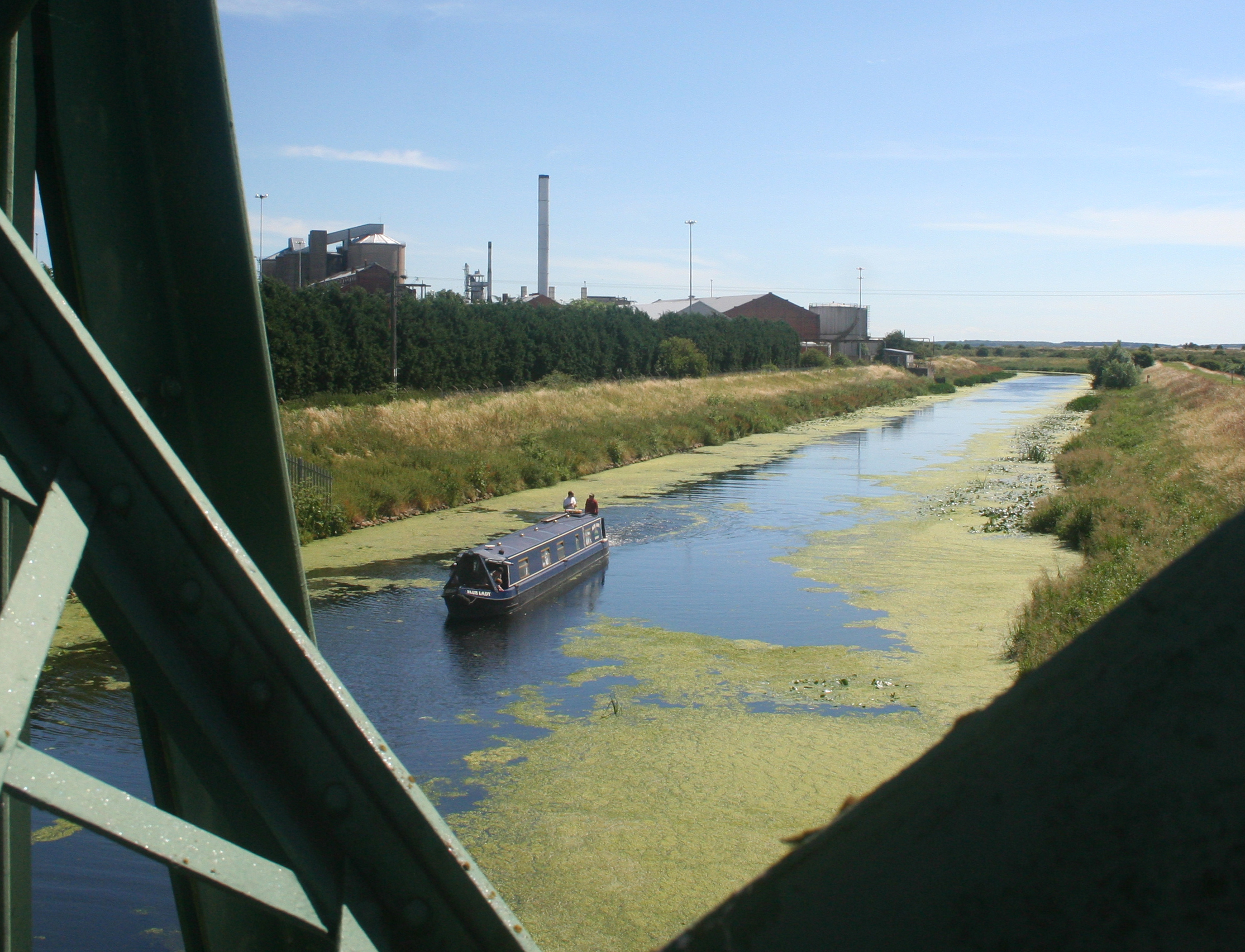
Bardney sugar factory, once a major user of river water and rail transport. now closed

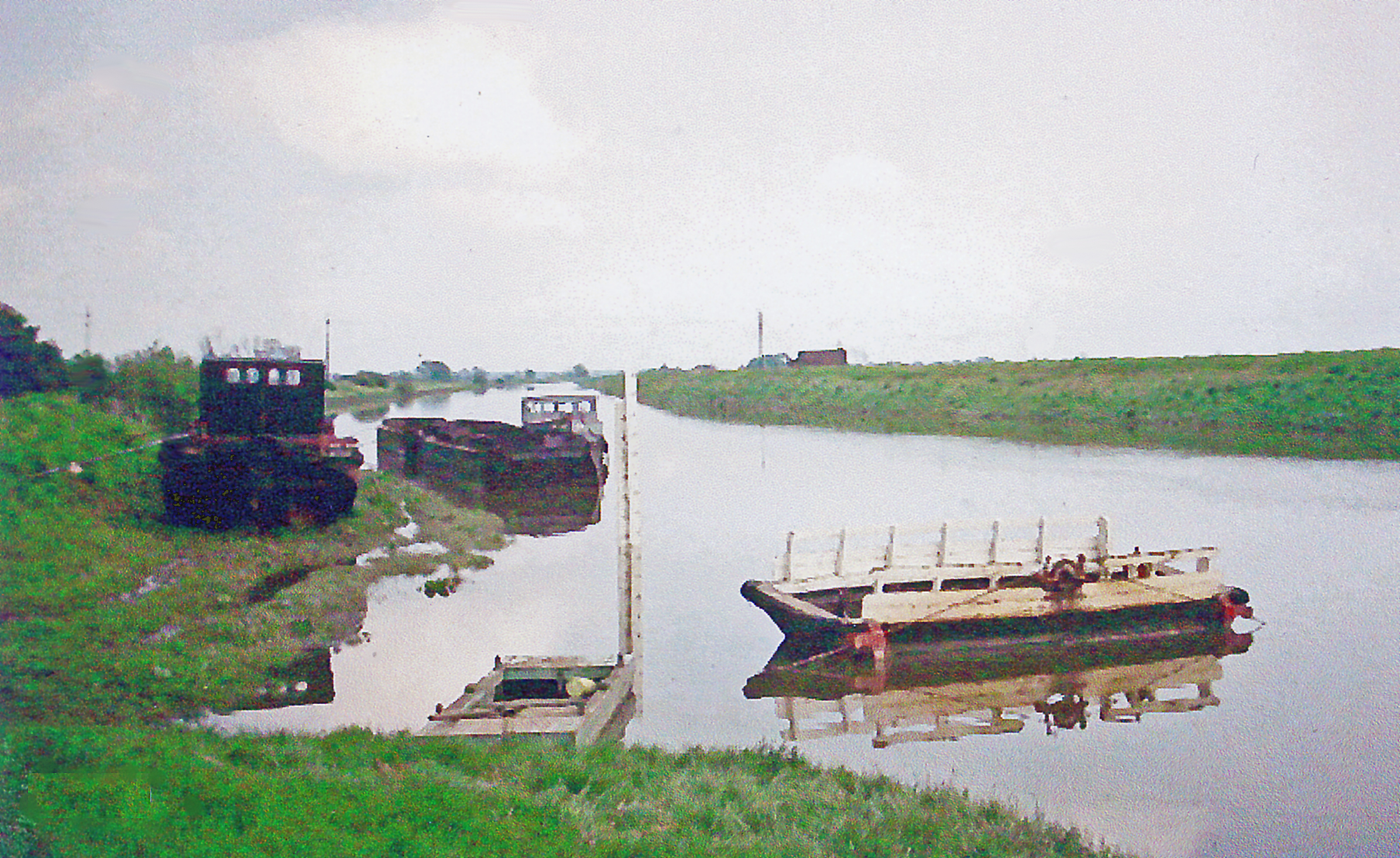
Stixwold Ferry in 1967. Several of the railway stations had these chain ferries provided.

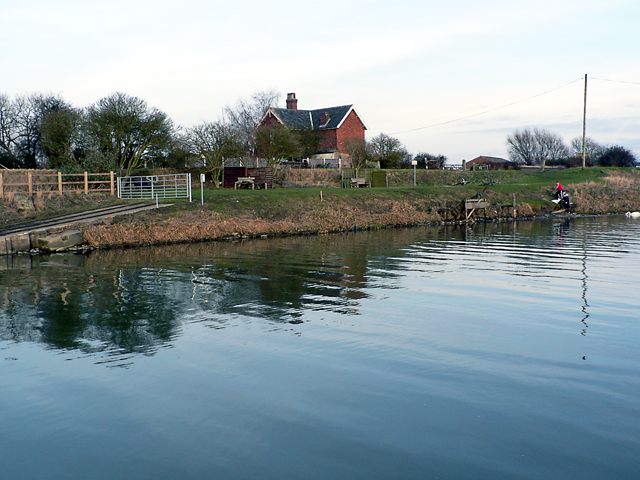
Former railway station, Southrey

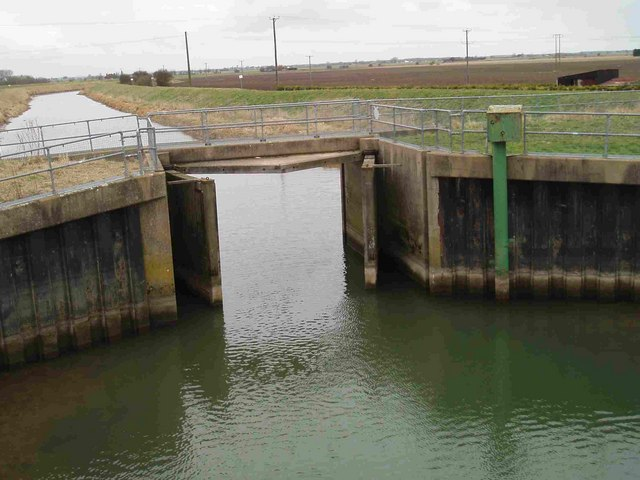
Sluice gate for the Kyme Eau, once the junction for the Sleaford canal

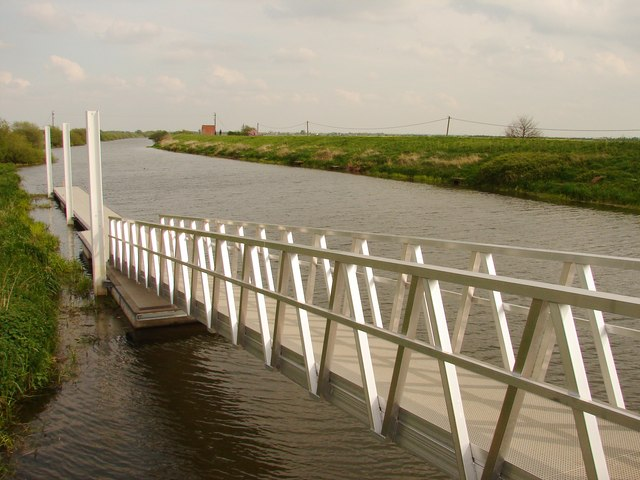
Day mooring at Southrey

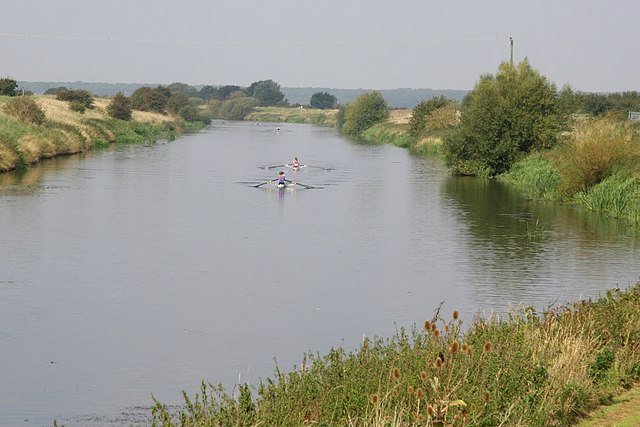
participants in the Boston Rowing Marathon near Stixwould

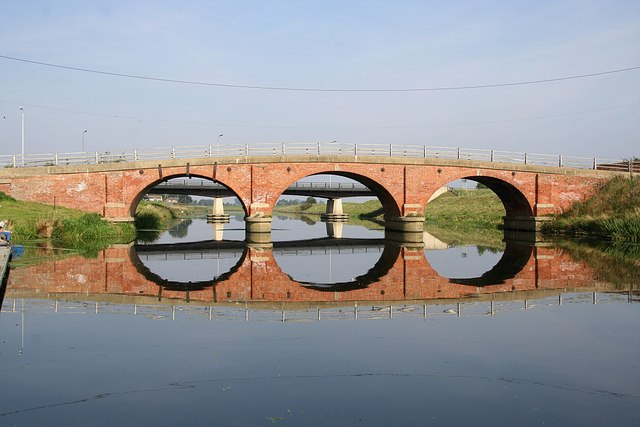
Old & new bridges at Tattershall

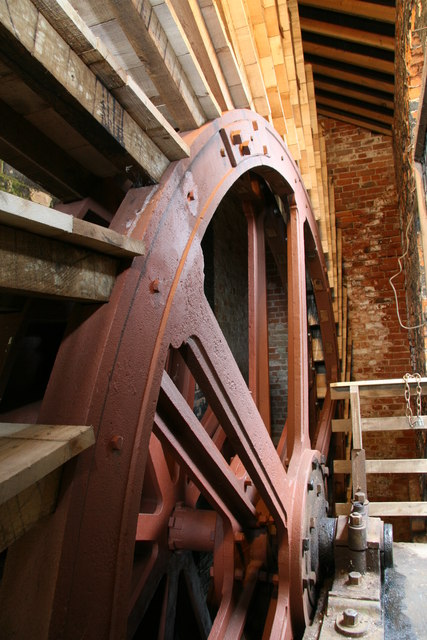
Scoop wheel of the Dogdyke Engine. Many land drains are pumped into the Witham. This is how it was once done.

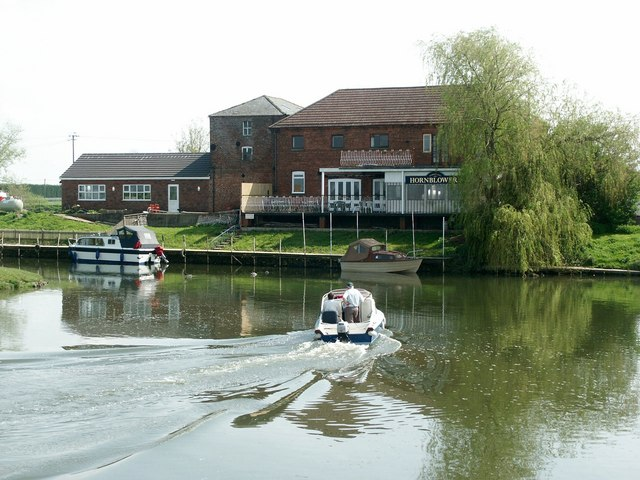
Riverside pub at Dogdyke, junction with the Horncastle Canal

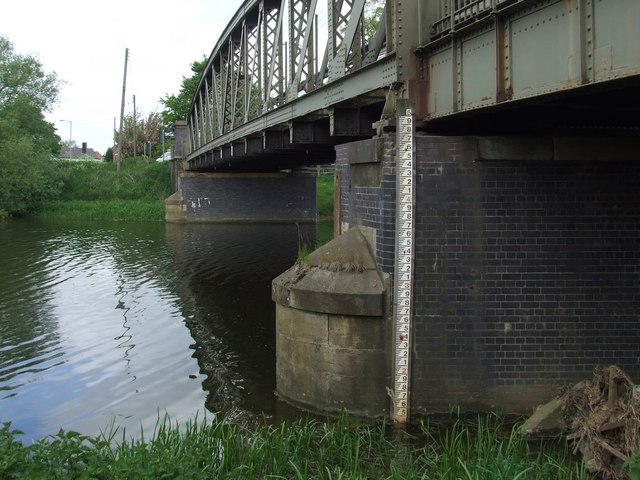
Langrick Bridge, which replaced a ferry once masted trading vessels no longer operated.

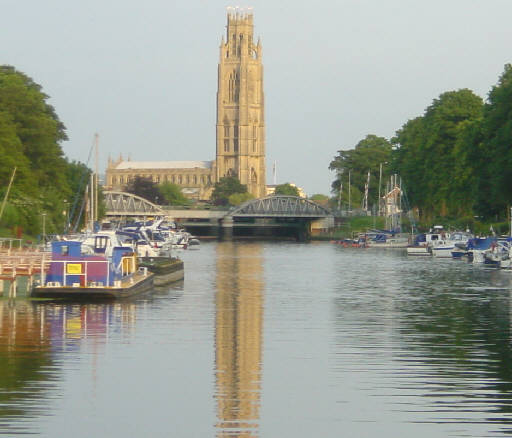
Boston

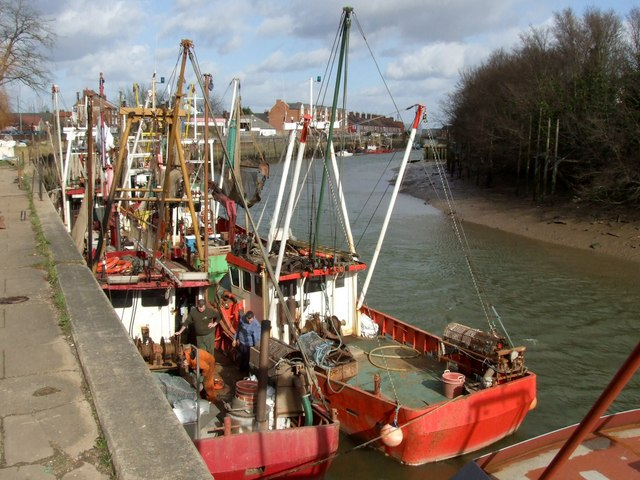
The Haven. Tidal waters below the Witham.

== Tributaries ==
- Foston Beck
- River Brant
- Fossdyke Navigation, a canalisation of the lower River Till
- Barlings Eau
- River Bain
- Kyme Eau, the fenland part of the River Slea

The following flow into The Haven:

- South Forty-Foot Drain
- Maud Foster Drain (part of Witham Navigable Drains)
- Hobhole Drain (part of Witham Navigable Drains)

== See also ==
- Kirkstead Bridge
- Rivers of the United Kingdom
- River Witham sword
- Witham Navigable Drains
- Witham First District IDB
- Witham Third District IDB
- Upper Witham IDB
