= All Saints' Church, Barnby in the Willows =

All Saints' Church, Barnby-in-the-Willows
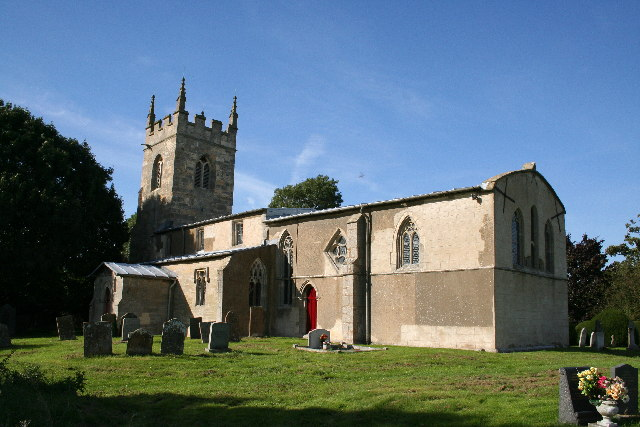
- All Saints' Church, Barnby-in-the-Willows
- All Saints' Church, Barnby-in-the-Willows
- 53°3′33.26″N 0°43′5.63″W
- OS grid reference: SK 86033 52189
- Location: Barnby in the Willows
- Country: England
- Denomination: Church of England

History
- Dedication: All Saints

Architecture
- Heritage designation: Grade I listed

Administration
- Diocese: Diocese of Southwell and Nottingham
- Archdeaconry: Newark
- Deanery: Newark and Southwll
- Parish: Balderton

All Saints' Church, Barnby in the Willows, is a Grade I listed parish church in the Church of England in Barnby in the Willows.

== History ==
The church dates from the 13th century. It comprises a chancel, nave and two aisles of the 13th century and a west tower which is 15th century. The altar rails are of the early 17th century.

The chancel windows have some very unusual tracery which may date from the 17th century. Inside is a Norman arcade and a delightful collection of 15th century poppy heads on bench ends.

It is part of a benefice with St Giles' Church, Balderton and All Saints' Church, Coddington.

== See also ==
- Grade I listed buildings in Nottinghamshire
- Listed buildings in Barnby in the Willows
