= Foss Dyke =

Canal that connects the River Trent to Lincoln

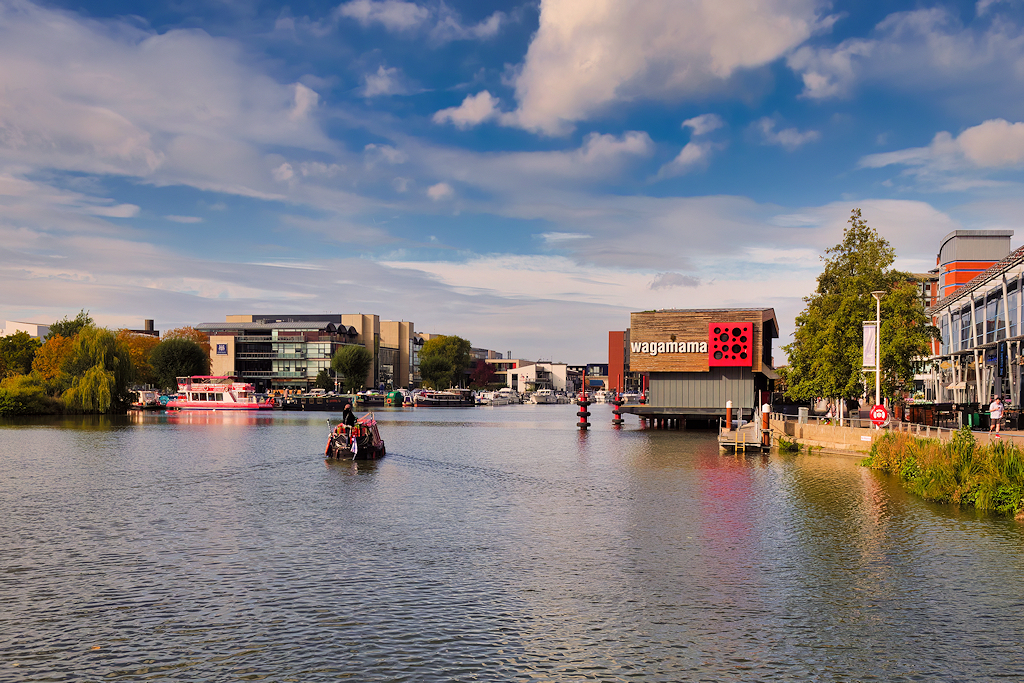
- Brayford Pool in Lincoln, where the Foss Dyke meets the River Witham
- Interactive map of Foss Dyke

Specifications
- Length: 11 miles (18 km)
- Maximum boat length: 74 ft 6 in (22.71 m)
- Maximum boat beam: 15 ft 2 in (4.62 m)
- Locks: 1
- Status: Operational
- Navigation authority: Canal and River Trust

Geography
- Start point: Lincoln
- End point: Torksey
- Connects to: River Trent, River Witham

The Foss Dyke, or Fossdyke, connects the River Trent at Torksey to Lincoln, the county town of Lincolnshire, and may be the oldest canal in England that is still in use. It is usually thought to have been built around AD 120 by the Romans, but there is no consensus among authors. It was refurbished in 1121, during the reign of King Henry I, and responsibility for its maintenance was transferred to the city of Lincoln by King James I. Improvements made in 1671 included a navigable sluice or lock at Torksey, and warehousing and wharves were built at Brayford Pool in the centre of Lincoln.

Connection to the River Witham at Brayford was hampered by the small bore and depth of High Bridge, a medieval structure just below the pool. The channel through it was made deeper in 1795, but John Rennie's plans to demolish it in 1803 were not adopted. The canal was leased to several generations of the Ellison family, who profited from the tolls but failed to maintain it. Although cargoes of coal and wool moved to the railway, the carriage of grain continued, and the last commercial operation was in 1972. The Brayford Mere Trust have turned Brayford Pool into a marina, and the Lincolnshire Waterways Partnership are opening a footpath and cycleway from Lincoln to Torksey; the section to Saxilby was officially opened on 26 July 2011.

== Route ==
The Foss Dyke joins the River Trent at Torksey. A branch leaves the main channel, passes under the A156 bridge, and immediately enters Torksey lock, which is the only lock on the canal. It has six sets of gates, three sets facing Lincoln, and three facing the river, which is tidal at this point, and so its level can be higher than the level of the canal. The gates allow the lock to be used at most states of the tide. A steel footbridge crosses the lock near the road, and both the footbridge and the lock are grade II listed structures. The canal runs to the east, and then turns south, passing to the east of Fenton and Kettlethorpe. Soon it is joined by the A57, and turns east again. The road runs along the south bank, until Saxilby is reached.

At Saxilby, the Manchester, Sheffield and Lincolnshire Railway crosses the waterway, to run along the south bank all the way to Lincoln. There was once a swing bridge beyond the railway bridge, which was removed in 1937, although the foundations are still obvious. Access over the canal at this point was reinstated in 1987, when a footbridge was installed. The original bridge was manufactured in 1884, and had crossed the Great Northern Railway at Newark-on-Trent for 103 years before it was put to this new use. The A57 crosses to the north bank soon after the railway bridge.

The River Till flows south and under the road to join the Foss Dyke, after which a new marina has been built at Burton Waters. Because the construction has breached the flood bank, it is protected by a flood gate. The canal passes under the A46 on the outskirts of Lincoln, and then intersects with a drainage ditch, to run alongside the Carholme golf club. The final bridge carries the B1273 Brayford Way over the canal as it enters Brayford Pool, once a busy commercial wharf in the centre of Lincoln, but now a marina, with the University of Lincoln on the southern bank. The unnavigable River Witham flows into the bottom end of the pool, and becomes the Witham Navigation when it flows out on its way to Boston.

== History ==
The Foss Dyke was long thought to have been constructed by the Romans around 120. Pointers include an inscribed statuette of the god Mars found in it at Torksey, which is now in the British Museum, but there is a lack of consensus among authors writing on the subject.

The first record of it comes from Symeon of Durham, whose Historia Regium notes the following for the year 1121:

In the same year, king Henry cut a large canal from Torksey to Lincoln, and by causing the River Trent to flow into it, he made it navigable for vessels.

Some take this to mean that the canal did not exist before Henry's construction work. Thus Kevin Leahy writes:

Even if the Fossdyke had been built by the Romans it needs a high level of maintenance and after a few hundred years of neglect it would have been difficult to find, let alone navigate.

Others, though, consider that Henry I merely scoured out an existing structure; Mark Bennett, writing for the East Midlands Archaeological Research Framework says:

The Foss Dyke is almost certainly Roman. No quay has been identified at Lincoln as yet although a length of wall suggestive of a quay was uncovered in the 1950s at the site of the Telephone Exchange east of the walled city and north of the Witham.

The canal is about 11 miles (18 km) long. It possibly follows an earlier line of the Trent, which emptied into the Wash prior to the end of the last Ice Age. Together with the 56-mile (90 km) Car Dyke it formed part an important transport route from Peterborough to York.

It was reputedly used by the Danes when they invaded England and by the Normans to carry stone to build Lincoln Cathedral in the 11th century. Following King Henry I's work discussed above, the canal deteriorated, until by the 17th century it was virtually impassable. Katherine Swynford, who lived in the area, is credited with having organized a protest to repair it, in 1375. King James I transferred ownership to the Corporation of Lincoln.

Foss Dyke and Witham Navigation Act 1670
- Act of Parliament
- Parliament of England
- Long title: An Act for improving the Navigation between the Town of Boston and the River Trent.
- Citation: 22 & 23 Cha. 2. c. 25 Pr.
- Territorial extent: England and Wales

Dates
- Royal assent: 22 April 1671
- Commencement: 24 October 1670 (Note: Start of session.)

Status: Current legislation

In 1671, during the reign of Charles II, Lincoln obtained an act of Parliament, the Foss Dyke and Witham Navigation Act 1670 (22 & 23 Cha. 2. c. 25 Pr.) which authorised improvements from Boston to the Trent. Work was carried out on the Foss Dyke, but only the first 100 yards (91 m) of the Witham, from Brayford Pool to High Bridge, received attention. The work was carried out by Samuel Fortrey, a man with previous experience of draining the fens. He was required to bear some of the cost himself, in exchange for some of the profits. The work was completed in 1672, and included a navigable sluice or lock at Torksey, which had first been proposed by Simon Hill in 1632. Warehouses and wharves were built at Brayford Pool, but by 1717, passage from Torksey was again difficult. Coal traffic averaged 1,357 long tons (1,379 tonnes) per year, bound for Lincoln, but tolls were insufficient to finance repairs. The city of Lincoln did not have the expertise to manage the waterway, and so leased it to Richard Ellison in 1741, who had experience with the River Don Navigation. He paid £75 per year for a navigation which generated around £100 in toll receipts. He dredged it to provide 3 feet 6 inches (1.07 m) of depth, and re-opened it in 1744. Two years later, the tolls were £595, and continued to increase. Under his son, the tolls were £2,367 in 1789, while his grandson collected £5,159 in 1811.

Navigation through Lincoln and on to Boston was hampered by the shallow draught available under the medieval High Bridge, just below Brayford Pool. Sir Joseph Banks, when proposing the construction of the Horncastle Canal knew that the problem needed addressing, and William Jessop was commissioned to survey the Witham and the Foss Dyke in 1791, with particular reference to the junction between the two. He proposed a bypass to the south of the city, using the Sincil Dyke, or excavating the channel beneath the bridge, although he recognized that this solution was not ideal, due to the narrow width of the bridge hole, and the lack of a towing path through it. However, the city was keen to keep trade within its limits, and improvements to High Bridge, which were completed by 1795, were authorised as part of the Horncastle Canal Act 1792 (32 Geo. 3. c. 107).

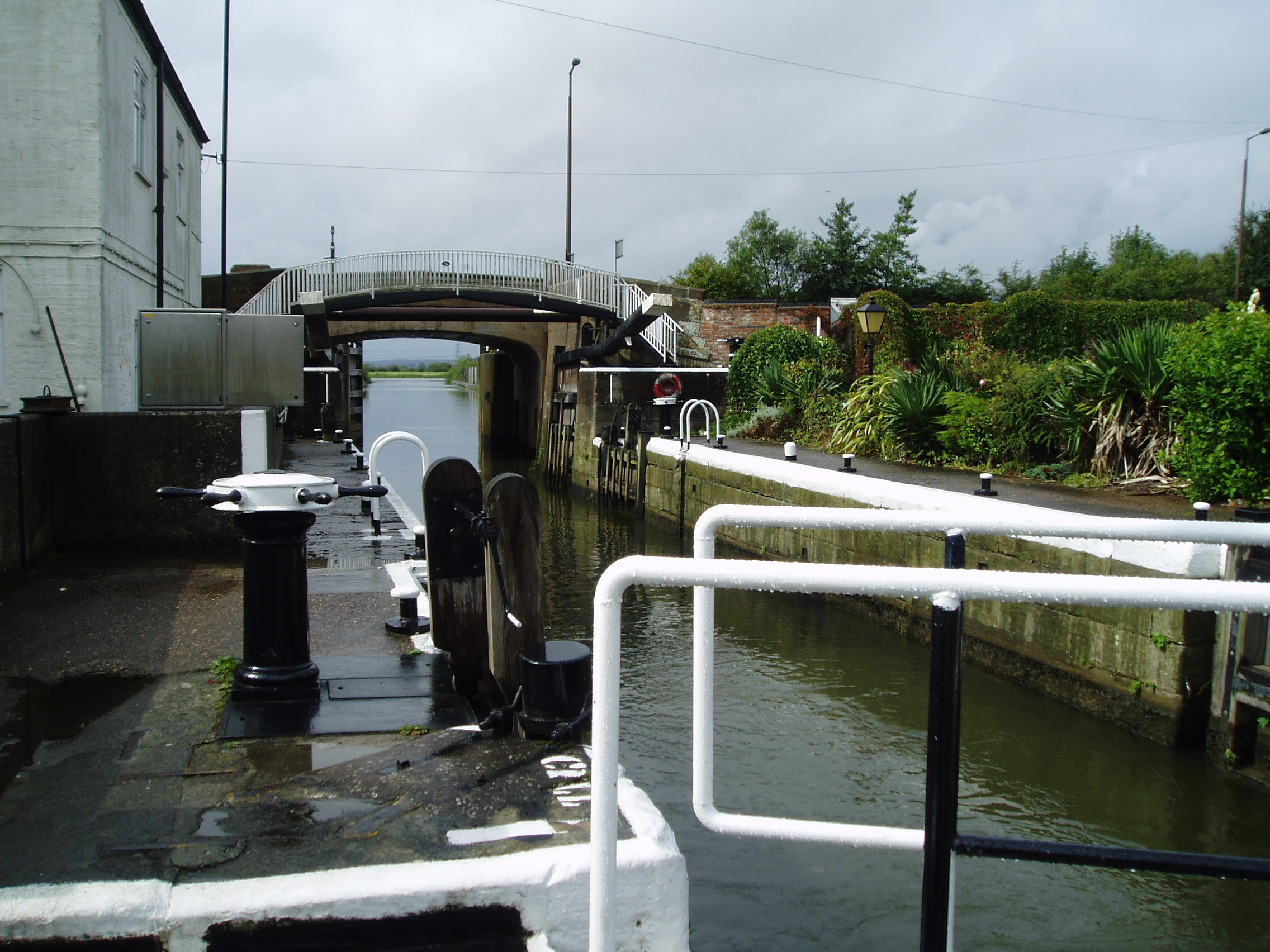
Torksey Lock, looking towards the River Trent. Four sets of gates are visible, and a further two sets are situated beyond the bridge.

The Witham Navigation was soon needing repairs, and the commissioners asked John Rennie for advice in 1802. His report, published in 1803, included recommendations to demolish High Bridge so that a waterway 34 feet (10 m) wide could be built under a new bridge, and improvements to the Foss Dyke costing £12,260. Neither action was followed. The canal was difficult to maintain, because much of it ran through sand and quicksand. The situation was more complex, because it had been leased to the Ellisons for three generations, and Richard Ellison III was not keen to spend any money on it. Income from tolls would have more than covered repairs, but there was little that could be done. A challenge to the legality of his lease was considered in the 1820s, but was not thought likely to succeed. He died in 1827, and Humphrey Sibthorp, his niece's husband, who was a proprietor on the River Witham, took over responsibility for it. He asked Isambard Brunel to survey it, and although he did so in 1833, no improvements were made.

Richard Ellison's Estate Act 1845
- Act of Parliament
- Parliament of the United Kingdom
- Long title: An Act for enabling Richard Ellison Esquire and his Trustees to grant Leases of the Fossdyke Navigation in the County of Lincoln; and for other Purposes.
- Citation: 8 & 9 Vict. c. 18 Pr.
- Territorial extent: United Kingdom

Dates
- Royal assent: 4 August 1845

Text of statute as originally enacted

Railways arrived in Lincoln in 1848. The Wakefield, Lincoln and Boston Railway had negotiated with the proprietors of the Witham and Foss Dyke in 1846, to guarantee them an income by leasing the waterways. Richard Ellison IV had agreed a lease for 894 years, at £9,570 per year, based on the average profit for the previous three years plus 5 per cent. This was authorised by the Richard Ellison's Estate Act 1845 (8 & 9 Vict. c. 18 Pr.). The line was built by the Great Northern Railway (GNR), who took over the leases already agreed. The Witham was affected more than the Foss Dyke, as the line followed its bank from Lincoln to Boston. The Manchester, Sheffield and Lincolnshire Railway (MSLR) passed through Saxilby to Lincoln a little later. Combined figures for the two waterways showed a drop in goods carried of two-thirds between 1848 and 1868. Cargoes of coal and wool were the first to transfer to the railways. However, the MSLR, by then renamed the Great Central Railway (GCR), built a dock and transshipment warehouse at Brayford in 1897. The Foss Dyke carried 75,881 long tons (77,099 tonnes) in 1905, and an average of 69,611 long tons (70,728 tonnes) between 1913 and 1917, most of it general goods and agricultural produce. A series of takeovers and mergers resulted in its ownership changing several times, before it was nationalised, and became the responsibility of the British Waterways Board in 1948.

Although its date of construction is unknown, the London and North Eastern Railway (successors of both the GNR and the GCR) built a small pumping station to the west of Torksey lock. It contained a steam-powered beam engine, which was probably made by Davy Brothers of Sheffield, and drove a double-acting bucket pump. It was situated close to the land drainage pumping station, which pumps into the tidal part of the Foss Dyke, draining some 13,000 acres (53 km^{2}) of low-lying land to the south of Torksey. Its job was to maintain the water levels in the navigation, but it was demolished in 1936, and no traces of it remain. A new pumping station at a similar location was commissioned in 1974. This forms part of the Trent–Witham–Ancholme transfer scheme. A pumping station at Short Ferry on Barlings Eau pumps water through an 11-mile (18 km) pipeline to Toft Newton reservoir, on the upper reaches of the Ancholme. The water is used to maintain the flow and level of the Ancholme during the summer months and other dry periods. When there is insufficient water in Barlings Eau and the Witham, Torksey pumping station transfers water from the Trent through a short pipeline into Foss Dyke. From there it flows for 10.8 miles (17.4 km) along the waterway to Brayford Pool and so into the Witham, to supplement the water available for pumping.

== Restoration ==
Unlike many waterways, the Foss Dyke never closed, and continued to carry grain traffic until 1972. However, the demise of general commercial traffic had left Brayford Pool in the centre of Lincoln as a derelict body of water, full of debris such as rubbish and sunken boats. The local Chamber of Commerce sought to address the issue in 1965, and formed Brayford Improvement Committee. Advice was sought from the Inland Waterways Association, and eventually the Brayford Mere Trust was constituted. They removed the wrecks from the pool, and have rebuilt the site, so that it offers facilities for visiting pleasure craft, now the major users of the waterway. A former lift bridge, which crossed the western entrance to the pool, was replaced in August 1996 by a new concrete flyover, as part of the redevelopment of the south bank, which included the opening of the University of Lincoln in the same year. 2 miles (3.2 km) to the west of Lincoln, a new 15-acre (6.1 ha) marina has been constructed at Burton Waters, as part of a 140-acre (57 ha) housing development.

Construction of a footpath and cycleway beside the canal from Lincoln to Saxilby has been carried out by the Lincolnshire Waterways Partnership, a joint initiative by Lincolnshire County Council, the Environment Agency and British Waterways. For much of its route it runs along the top of the northern floodbank, but drops down to a new crossing of the A57 road and a new bridge across the River Till near Saxilby. The route was officially opened on 26 July 2011. Extending the path to Torksey is a longer-term aim.

== Points of interest ==
Point	Coordinates (Links to map resources)	OS Grid Ref	Notes
Torksey Lock	53.2929°N 0.7439°W	SK838780	Junction with River Trent
Drinsey Nook	53.2586°N 0.6935°W	SK872743	Joined by A57 road
Saxilby railway bridge	53.2660°N 0.6609°W	SK894751	
River Till junction	53.2630°N 0.6257°W	SK917748	
Burton Waters marina	53.2484°N 0.5983°W	SK936732	
Catchwater Drain aqueduct	53.2364°N 0.5717°W	SK954719	
Brayford Pool	53.2287°N 0.5453°W	SK972711	Junction with Witham Navigation

== See also ==
- Canals of the United Kingdom
- History of the British canal system
- List of Roman canals
- Upper Witham IDB

== Bibliography ==
- Boyes, John; Russell, Ronald (1977). The Canals of Eastern England. David and Charles. ISBN 978-0-7153-7415-3.
- Clarke, J.N. (1990). The Horncastle and Tattershall Canal. Oakwood Press. ISBN 978-0-85361-398-5.
- Cumberlidge, Jane (2009). Inland Waterways of Great Britain (8th ed.). Imray Laurie Norie and Wilson. ISBN 978-1-84623-010-3.
- Greene, Kevin (1992). The archaeology of the Roman economy. University of California Press. ISBN 978-0-520-07401-9.
- Hill, Sir Francis (2008). Medieval Lincoln. Cambridge University Press. ISBN 978-0-521-07925-9.
- Hinde, K. S. G. (2006). Fenland Pumping Engines. Landmark Publishing Ltd. ISBN 978-1-84306-188-5.
- Itinerary (7 June 1996). Lincolnshire Catchment Panel Field Visit (PDF). Environment Agency. Archived (PDF) from the original on 4 March 2016.
- Leahy, Kevin (2007). The Anglo-Saxon Kingdom of Lindsey. Tempus. ISBN 978-0-7524-4111-5.
- Lower, John; Richardson, Christine (2008). Lincolnshire Waterways. Richlow. ISBN 978-0-9552609-5-7.
- McKnight, Hugh (1981). The Shell Book of Inland Waterways. David and Charles. ISBN 978-0-7153-8239-4.
- Nicholson (2006). Nicholson Guides Vol 6: Nottingham, York and the North East. Harper Collins Publishers. ISBN 978-0-00-721114-2.
- Skempton, Sir Alec; et al. (2002). A Biographical Dictionary of Civil Engineers in Great Britain and Ireland: Vol 1: 1500 to 1830. Thomas Telford. ISBN 978-0-7277-2939-2.
- Squires, Roger (2008). Britain's restored canals. Landmark Publishing. ISBN 978-1-84306-331-5.
- Stevenson, Joseph (trans) (1855). Church Historians of England. Vol. 3 Part 2. Seeleys.
