= Horncastle Canal =

Specifications
- Maximum boat length: 72 ft 0 in (21.95 m)
- Maximum boat beam: 15 ft 0 in (4.57 m)
- Locks: 12
- Status: Reverted to river

History
- Original owner: Horncastle Canal Company
- Principal engineer: William Jessop
- Other engineer: John Rennie
- Date of act: 1792, 1800
- Date of first use: 1795
- Date completed: 1802
- Date closed: 1889

Geography
- Start point: Horncastle
- End point: River Witham, Dogdyke

The Horncastle Canal was a broad canal which ran 11 miles (18 km) from the River Witham to Horncastle in Lincolnshire, England, through twelve locks largely following the course of the River Bain. The canal opened in 1802, and was abandoned for navigation in 1889.

== History ==
By the 1790s, the Manor of Horncastle was leased by Sir Joseph Banks, a man of both local and national standing, with a keen interest in agriculture and trade. He had plans which included an inclosure act for Horncastle and drainage of the Wildmore Fen, and was also influential in plans for the canalisation of the River Bain from Horncastle to the River Witham near Tatteshall. Tattershall was already served by a short canal from the River Witham, which had been constructed in 1786 by John Gibson, a merchant from Tattershall, and John Dyson, who was from Bawtry. The canal was about 1 mile (1.6 km) long, and had an entrance lock near to where it joined the river.

Tattershall Canal Act 1792
- Act of Parliament
- Parliament of Great Britain
- Long title: An Act for enlarging and improving the Canal called Tattershall Canal, from the River Witham to the Town of Tattershall, and extending the same into the River Bain, and for making the said River Bain navigable from thence to or into the Town of Horncastle, all in the County of Lincoln; and also for amending and rendering complete the navigable Communication between the said River Witham and the Fosdike Canal, through the High Bridge, in the City of Lincoln.
- Citation: 32 Geo. 3. c. 107
- Territorial extent: Great Britain

Dates
- Royal assent: 11 June 1792
- Commencement: 31 January 1792 (Note: Start of session.)
Other legislation
Amended by	Horncastle Navigation Act 1800; River Witham Drainage and Navigation Act 1808

Status: Amended

Text of statute as originally enacted

Sir Joseph Banks canvassed the support of local merchants and the owners of the estates that bordered the river, and formed a steering committee, which instructed Sir Joseph's solicitor to draft a parliamentary bill for the proposed canal. This was ready by March 1792, and was considered by a public meeting held on 4 April. That meeting approved the bill, which became an act of Parliament, the Tattershall Canal Act 1792 (32 Geo. 3. c. 107) on 11 June 1792. In addition to local supporters, the bill was also supported by the corporations of Boston and Lincoln, as it included a clause that would enable the channel beneath Lincoln High Bridge, a medieval structure which prevented navigation from the River Witham to the Brayford Pool, to be made deeper. The act also regularised the position of the Gibson Cut, which had been built without an act of Parliament on land owned by Lord Fortescue, and ensured that he would be compensated when the cut was taken over by the new company.

=== Construction ===
The company was authorised to raise £15,000 by the issuing of shares, and another £10,000 if required. While the major shareholders were Sir Joseph and Lord Fortescue, 294 others, mostly from the local area, bought shares. At this stage, the engineer William Jessop was asked to review the plans, and suggested two routes, one from Horncastle to Kirkstead, and the other following the course of the River Bain to Tattershall and joining the River Witham at Dogdyke. It was this latter scheme that was adopted, although Jessop's plans to build the locks to take boats of 54 ft by 14.3 ft (16.5m x 4.4m) with a draught of 3.5 ft (1m) was overruled in favour of locks 72 ft by 15 ft (22m x 4.6m), which enabled the boats already plying the River Witham and Trent to use the canal.

Gibson's Cut was bought for £840, but in order to extend it to join the main line at Tattershall, part of the terminal warehouse had to be demolished, as it obstructed the line of the extension. Sir Joseph expected Jessop to oversee the work, but he was too busy and suggested William Cawley from Cheshire as engineer. Cawley was engaged in April 1793, and work started immediately, but workmanship was poor. The lock at Tattershall collapsed when first filled with water, and Cawley was dismissed in October, to be followed by a series of other engineers, none of whom lasted for very long. Pressure was put on the builders of the locks at Tattershall and Tumby and the bridge at Butts Road in Coningsby, and they agreed to rebuild them, rather than lose contracts for other parts of the canal.

Horncastle Navigation Act 1800
- Act of Parliament
- Parliament of Great Britain
- Long title: An Act for enabling the Horncastle Navigation Company to raise a further Sum of Money to complete the said Navigation, and for amending an Act, passed in the thirty-second Year of the Reign of his present Majesty, for making and maintaining the said Navigation.
- Citation: 39 & 40 Geo. 3. c. cix
- Territorial extent: Great Britain

Dates
- Royal assent: 9 July 1800
- Commencement: 9 July 1800 (Note: The Acts of Parliament (Commencement) Act 1793.)
Other legislation
Amends	Tattershall Canal Act 1792

Status: Current legislation

Text of statute as originally enacted

The canal was opened from the River Witham northwards, as each section became available. Tolls of £250 were collected in 1795, but the company was experiencing financial difficulties. The decision was taken to build a wharf at Dalderby, and to terminate the canal there. All of the original capital, together with the £10,000 mortgage on tolls had been spent by early 1797, and there was no immediate prospect of continuing. The engineer John Rennie was consulted, and he suggested that a new cut from Dalderby to Horncastle would be better than trying to follow the winding course of the River Bain. Accordingly, a new act of parliament, the Horncastle Navigation Act 1800 (39 & 40 Geo. 3. c. cix) was obtained on 9 July 1800, authorising the raising of a further £20,000, but very little money was attracted to the scheme, and the company eventually borrowed £20,600 from Lord Fortescue and Sir Joseph, mortgaged against the tolls of the canal. Rennie declined to oversee the work, and so William Walker was appointed, although he was not a qualified engineer. The canal was finally opened throughout in 1802, having cost nearly four times the original estimate. The cost included £1,165 which was part of the cost for the work carried out at High Bridge, Lincoln in 1797

== Operation ==
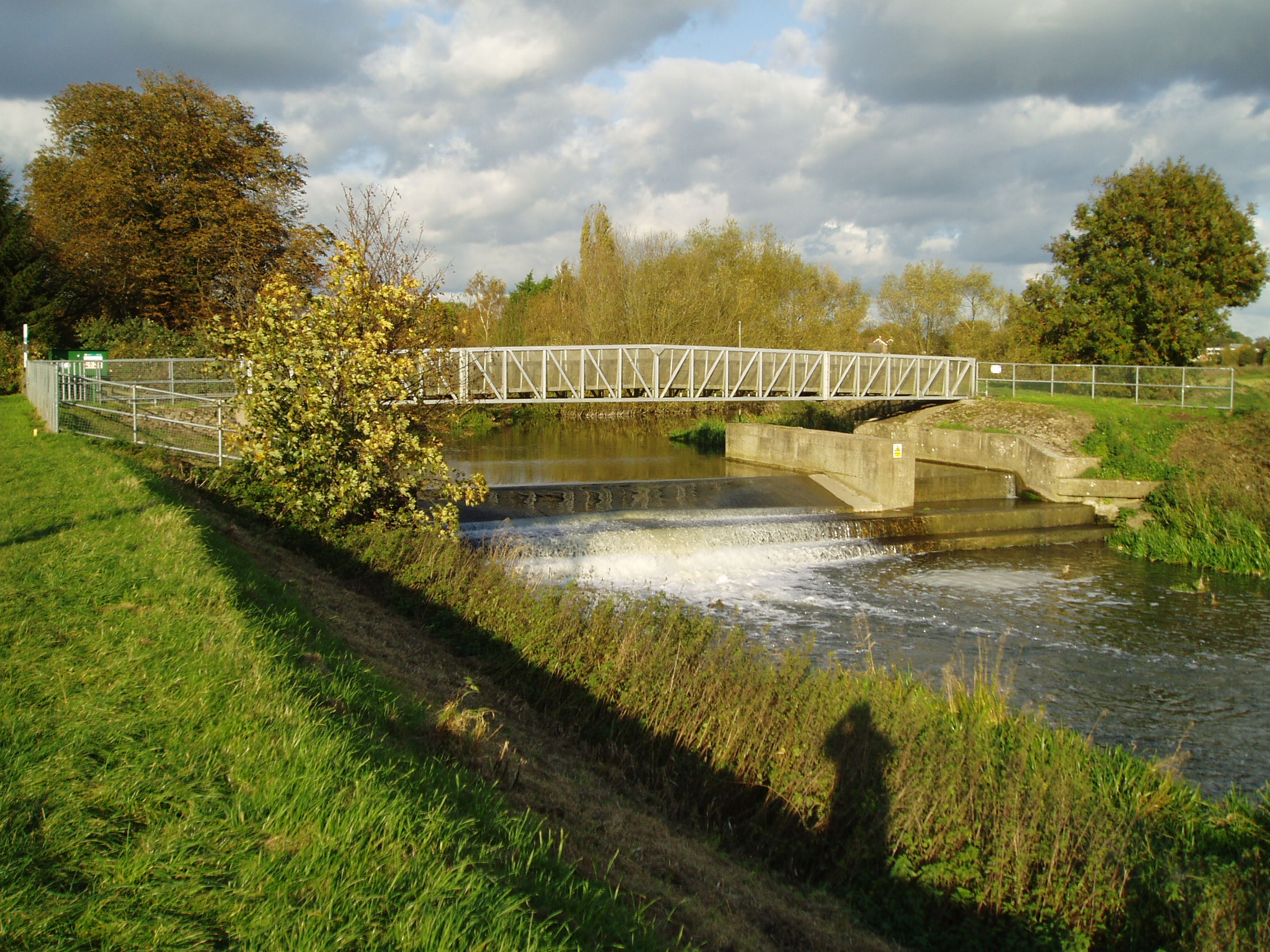
The weir and gauging station at Tattershall. Gibsons Cut turned off to the left, behind the green box.

"The Canal"
2011 recording of James Conway Walter's 1908 poem (full text)

The formal opening of the canal was on 17 September 1802, and the day was declared to be a public holiday in Horncastle, so that everyone could celebrate. Boats were decked with bunting and flags, a band played "rousing tunes", and the navvies were given free food and beer on boats in both the north and south basins.

Water levels in the canal were controlled by a sluice or staunch near the point at which the River Bain joined the River Waring. A new cut, called the South Ings Drain, which ran from below the sluice to join the old course of the River Bain near Thornton, was made under the terms of the Horncastle Enclosure Award in 1805. A cottage was erected next to the sluice to house the Staunchkeeper, as adjustment of the sluice was vital in times of drought or flood.

Tolls were collected, but for the first ten years were used to pay back the mortgage taken out in 1800, and it was not until 1813 that the first dividend was paid. Dividends were then paid every year as profits gradually increased. In the early 1850s, the canal carried around 9,710 tons of coal to Horncastle, and around 5,420 tons of goods, including corn and wool, in the other direction.

=== Decline ===
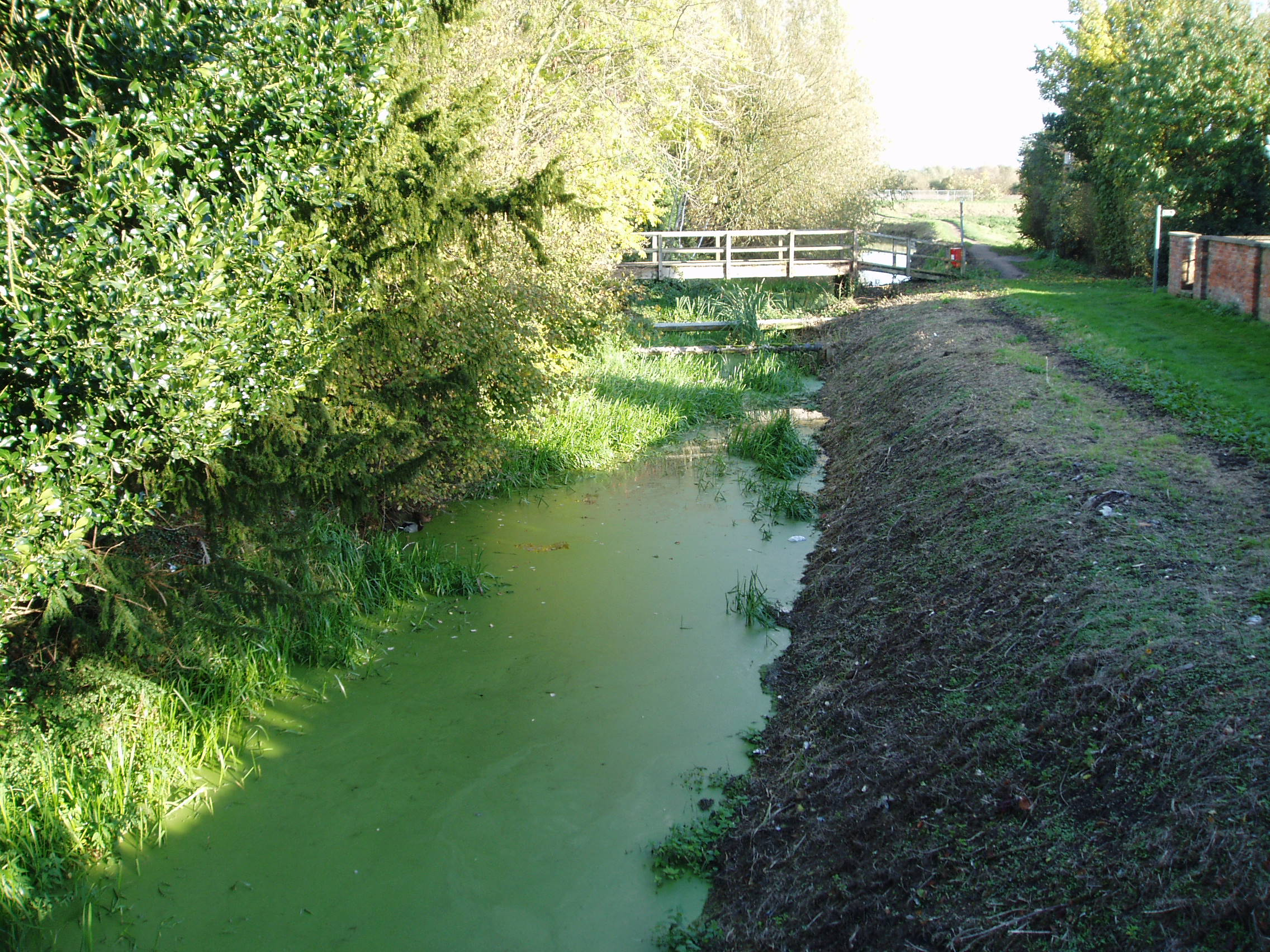
The remains of Gibsons Cut near its junction with the Dogdyke branch at Tattershall

In 1848, the Great Northern Railway opened a line from Lincoln to Boston, and built a coal wharf at Dogdyke in 1851. This resulted in increased traffic on the canal, but a branch line from Kirkstead to Horncastle via Woodhall Spa was opened in 1854, in direct competition to the canal, after which decline was rapid, with the last dividend being paid in 1873. Against this trend a short cut known as the Tumby Cut was built in 1876.

In 1888, the Board of Trade enquired about the status of the company, and Lindsey County Council suggested that it should be abandoned. The secretary sold Kirkby Watermill, which had been used as the company workshops, to raise some capital with which to clear debts, and notified the Board that the canal was effectively defunct. It was officially abandoned on 23 September 1889, but sand and gravel continued to be transported from Kirkby on Bain for another ten years, while the lower reaches of the canal remained in use until 1910 with boats taking coal from Goole to the Coningsby wharf of Laythorpe and Son, Coal Merchants.

=== Restoration ===
There have been several suggestions that the canal should be restored. The first was made in 1975 by the Lincolnshire Branch of the Inland Waterways Association, who recognised that the volume of pleasure traffic on the River Witham would need to increase before the scheme would be viable. In 1986, they prepared a more serious report, which concentrated on Gibson's Cut, but also looked at complete restoration in more general terms. From 1989, the Horncastle and Tattershall Conningsby Canal Heritage group (HATCH) began working on plans for restoration, which were presented at a public meeting held on 18 November 2003. The meeting agreed that funds should be raised to finance a proper feasibility study. Restoration plans are now supported by Lincolnshire County Council.

== Points of interest ==
Point	Coordinates (Links to map resources)	OS Grid Ref	Notes
North Wharf (River Bain)	53.2114°N 0.1164°W	TF258699	
South Wharf (River Waring)	53.2079°N 0.1153°W	TF259695	
Horncastle Lock	53.1977°N 0.1208°W	TF256683	
Thornton Lock	53.1934°N 0.1188°W	TF257679	
Martin Lock	53.1844°N 0.1310°W	TF249668	
Dalderby Lock	53.1765°N 0.1361°W	TF246659	
Roughton Lock	53.1674°N 0.1361°W	TF246649	
Haltham Lock	53.1560°N 0.1442°W	TF241637	
Kirkby on Bain Lock	53.1465°N 0.1451°W	TF241626	
Fulsby Lock	53.1316°N 0.1468°W	TF240609	
Tumby Lock	53.1189°N 0.1589°W	TF233595	
Coningsby Lock	53.1112°N 0.1663°W	TF228586	
Jn with Gibsons Cut	53.1031°N 0.1890°W	TF213577	modern weir
Tattershall Lock	53.0980°N 0.1884°W	TF213571	
Dogdyke Moorings	53.0840°N 0.1951°W	TF209556	Jn with River Witham
Gibsons Cut First Lock	53.0992°N 0.2124°W	TF197572	
Entrance to Gibsons Cut	53.0977°N 0.2186°W	TF193570	Jn with River Witham

== See also ==
- Canals of Great Britain
- History of the British canal system

== Bibliography ==
- Clarke, J. N. (1990). The Horncastle and Tattershall Canal. Oakwood Press. ISBN 978-0-85361-398-5.
- Cumberlidge, Jane (2009). Inland Waterways of Great Britain (8th Ed.). Imray Laurie Norie and Wilson. ISBN 978-1-84623-010-3.
- McKnight, Hugh (1981). The Shell Book of Inland Waterways. David and Charles.
- Priestley, Joseph (1831). "Historical Account of the Navigable Rivers, Canals, and Railways of Great Britain". Archived from the original on 4 March 2016.
- Squires, Roger (2008). Britain's restored canals. Landmark Publishing. ISBN 978-1-84306-331-5.
