= Surfleet =

Village in Lincolnshire, England

Coordinates: 52.837401°N 0.144259°W

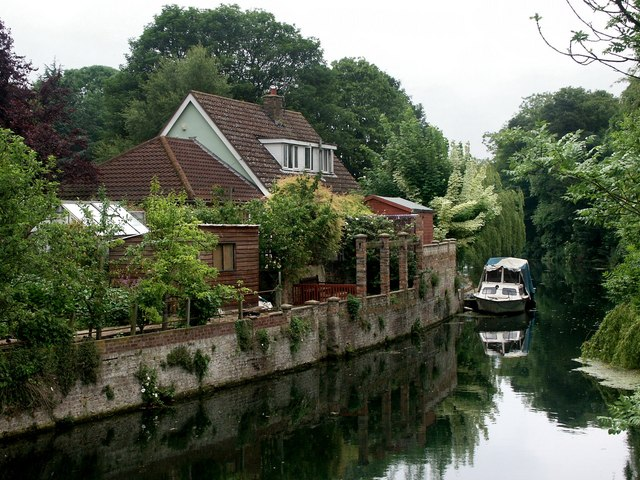
- River Glen at Surfleet

- Location within Lincolnshire
- Population: 1,338 (2011)
- OS grid reference: TF251282
  - London: 90 mi (140 km) S
- District: South Holland
- Shire county: Lincolnshire
- Region: East Midlands
- Country: England
- Sovereign state: United Kingdom
- Post town: SPALDING
- Postcode district: PE11
- Police: Lincolnshire
- Fire: Lincolnshire
- Ambulance: East Midlands
- UK Parliament: South Holland and The Deepings

Surfleet is a small village and civil parish in the South Holland district of Lincolnshire, England. It is situated on the B1356 road, 3 miles (4.8 km) north of Spalding, in the Lincolnshire fens.

The River Glen runs through the village to the east where it becomes tidal at the hamlet of Surfleet Seas End. The name Surfleet derives from the Old English sūr flēot meaning damp creek.

The parish had a population of 1,338 at the 2011 census.

== Landmarks ==
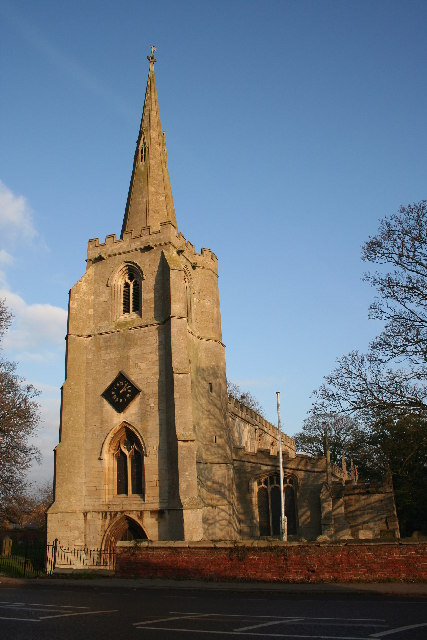
St Laurence's Church, Surfleet

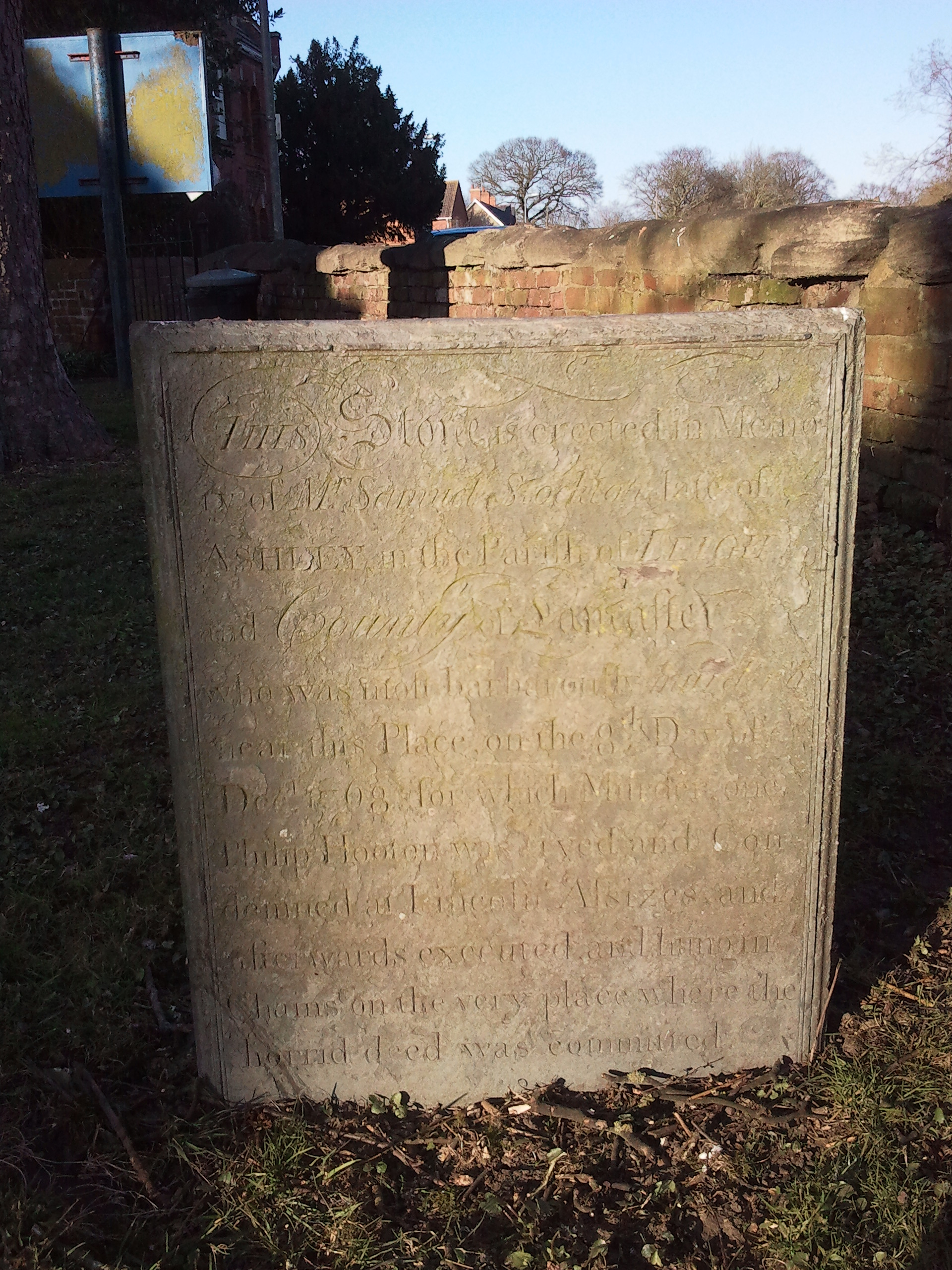
Samuel Stockton's inscribed headstone

Surfleet church is dedicated to Saint Laurence and includes a 15th-century font. The church tower leans 6 feet 4 1/2 inches (1.9 m) out of perpendicular. Remains of Roman sea banks and salt pans can also be seen near the village. The church is situated exactly 2.5 miles (4.0 km) between the nearby villages of Gosberton to the North and Pinchbeck to the South. The churchyard contains a gravestone in memory of a murder victim, Samuel Stockton. Stockton was lured from north-west England to Lincolnshire by a Gedney Hill farmer called Hooten in 1768. Hooten passed himself off as a preacher and brought Stockton to the Fens on the pretext of a business deal, but killed him for his money near the Common Marsh Bank. Hooten was executed at Lincoln for the crime and hanged in a gibbet cage near where he had committed the crime. The story is told in very faint letters on the stone, which is on the River Glen side of the churchyard.

Surfleet's Glen Park, 10 acres in size, has a public children's play area, outdoor gym equipment, picnic areas, a sensory garden, an out door class room and a busy forest school and a wheelchair friendly woodland trail. The park's all-weather and grass sports pitches are used by hockey and football teams.

== History ==
=== 1999 Harrier crash ===
On Friday 9 July 1999 at 2pm, next to the A16 bypass, Harrier 'ZD345' from RAF Cottesmore crashed.

The 39 year old pilot was taken to the Queen's Medical Centre with severe spinal injuries.

== Railway ==
The railway opened in Surfleet in the 1850s with the completion of the Great Northern Railway's Grimsby to Peterborough section of the Lincolnshire loop line. Surfleet railway station was situated to the east of the village in Surfleet Seas End. The station was a brick building with two platforms and sidings. Its signal box controlled the station, line points and signals. A small hotel, the Great Northern Hotel, was built and its name survived until the late 1980s, when it was renamed the Riverside Hotel.

Surfleet station was the first station north of the then much busier station in Spalding. Spalding was once a mainline station with lines from the north and west; now only the line from the north remains. It also had a line to Peterborough, which still exists, and a line from Norwich in the east, which was the first to be closed in the 1960s.

Regular trains linked Spalding to Boston and other destinations. The River Glen was used to transport goods from around Surfleet to the station, where they were transported throughout the country by rail. Goods consisted mostly of farm produce such as wheat, potatoes, flowers and barley, with sugar beet transported to Spalding's sugar beet factory. Fish and shellfish, caught in The Wash and landed at Surfleet Reservoir, were transported from Surfleet station, mostly on an early train to Billingsgate Market in London, for sale the same day. The line was owned and operated by the Great Northern Railway Company until the line was absorbed by the London & North Eastern Railway (LNER) in 1927.

British Railways closed the railway in Surfleet. The LNER disappeared with the nationalisation of British Railways by the 1948 Labour Government. The station was one of many lines across the country that was closed on recommendation of the Beeching Report—it closed to passengers in 1961 and to goods in 1963. The railway line between Spalding and Boston survived until late 1970 when, after more than 100 years of service, it was removed, leaving only station buildings. Spalding station was closed, but re-opened a year later to service areas that had lost their railway service.

The station buildings in Surfleet stood until 1994, when they were demolished to accommodate the building of the A16 Spalding Bypass. The A16 is built on the route of the old railway line from Boston to just beyond Surfleet, where it turns away to the left to avoid Spalding. The only remaining part of the station is the Riverside Hotel public house, which is on the original route of Station Road, itself re-routed to accommodate the A16.

== Education ==
Surfleet has a small primary school named the Surfleet Seas End County Primary School. It is in Station Road. It was built in 1878 and has the appearance of a typical Victorian School. The original school buildings are still used, as is the old schoolhouse, which has been refurbished and is now an administration office and visitor reception area.

The building has been extended since its first opening to improve and expand its facilities. It now has three internal classrooms, a multipurpose hall, a central library and a computer room. A further mobile building, in the rear playground, acts as the fourth classroom. It has two large hard surface playing areas, an environmental garden, a garden play area, and a large field used for sports and other recreational activities.

The school has under 90 pupils on roll, served by four full-time teaching staff and support and ancillary staff. After 2008 the school federated with Weston St Mary's Church of England Primary School.

== Notables ==
- Robinson Elsdale, writer and sailor
