= Algarkirk =

Village and civil parish in the Borough of Boston in Lincolnshire, England

Coordinates: 52.89°N 00.08°W

- Village and civil parish
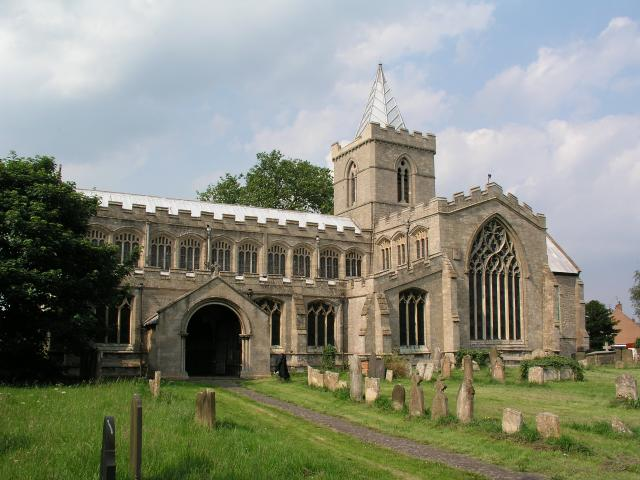
- Ss Peter and Paul Church, Algarkirk

- Location within Lincolnshire
- Population: 386 (2011)
- OS grid reference: TF291352
  - London: 95 mi (153 km) S
- District: Boston
- Shire county: Lincolnshire
- Region: East Midlands
- Country: England
- Sovereign state: United Kingdom
- Post town: Boston
- Postcode district: PE20
- Dialling code: 01205
- Police: Lincolnshire
- Fire: Lincolnshire
- Ambulance: East Midlands
- UK Parliament: Boston and Skegness

Algarkirk (/ˈældʒərkɜːrk/ AL-jər-kurk) is a village and civil parish in the Borough of Boston in Lincolnshire, England. It is situated 6 miles (9.7 km) south-south-west from Boston and near the A16 road. It has a population of 406, falling to 386 at the 2011 census. An alternative village spelling is 'Algakirk'.

== History ==
Before the Roman conquest the area was home to the Coritani; after Roman departure it became part of the Anglo Saxon kingdom of Mercia. Algarkirk has been claimed to be named after Ælfgar, Earl of Mercia, a son of Lady Godiva; he is reputedly buried in the graveyard of the parish church of St Peter and St Paul. The "kirk" element of the name comes from the Old English "circe" meaning church, which was later replaced by the Old Norse "kirk".

The 9th-century church itself is Early English and Norman with a double-aisle transept and a font of Purbeck marble. Under the tower are kneeling brass effigies of Nicholas Robertson (d. 1498), Merchant of the Staple of Calais, and his two wives Alice and Isabella. In 1492, he and Isabella glazed the church clerestorey. The church was heavily restored in 1851.

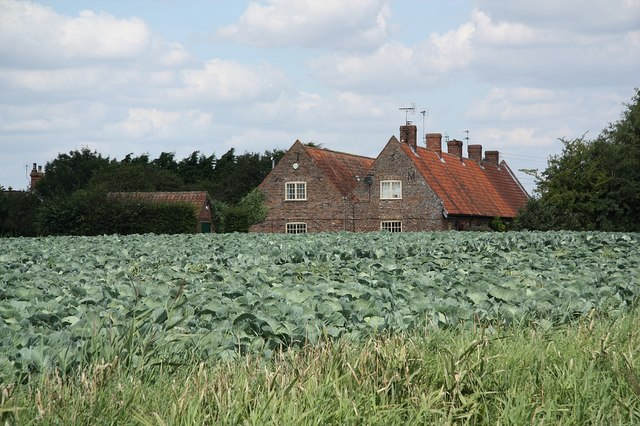
Middlecott's Hospital, Algarkirk Almshouses

Hitherto, the parish had formed part of Boston Rural District, in the Parts of Holland. Holland was one of the three divisions (formally known as parts) of the traditional county of Lincolnshire. Since the Local Government Act 1888, Holland had been, in most respects, a county in itself until the creation of Lincolnshire County Council in April 1974 by the combination of Holland, Lindsey (except for those areas transferred to Humberside) and Kesteven County Councils.

The Algarkirk woad mill closed down after the 1932 crop. The mill owner was George Nussey Snr.

== Demography ==
The population was recorded as 386 in the 2011 Census, a drop from 406 on the 2001 Census.

Historical population

| Year | Pop. | ±% |
|---|---|---|
| 1881 | 520 | — |
| 1891 | 469 | −9.8% |
| 1901 | 423 | −9.8% |
| 1911 | 485 | +14.7% |
| 1921 | 590 | +21.6% |

| Year | Pop. | ±% |
|---|---|---|
| 1931 | 593 | +0.5% |
| 1951 | 560 | −5.6% |
| 1961 | 534 | −4.6% |
| 2001 | 406 | −24.0% |
| 2011 | 386 | −4.9% |

== Geography ==
The village was once served by Algarkirk and Sutterton railway station on the now-closed Lincolnshire Loop Line that connected Boston and Spalding. The A16 has been rebuilt on the former railway line although the station building is now a showroom.

Algarkirk lies close to the B1397. The bypass, known as the Boston-Algarkirk Diversion, was built by Amey Construction, to take two years from February 1990. It was 5.5 miles long, and cost £8,961,439. The bypass opened on 29 October 1991.

The village primary school, the Fourfields school, is shared with Sutterton.

The village is close to the parish boundary with Sutterton, so that the two parish churches are six or seven hundred metres apart. While most of the parishes in Holland are more or less long and narrow so as to include both saltmarsh and fen, this was originally achieved in Algarkirk by having a detached fen about 12 kilometres away, in Holland Fen. This is now part of Amber Hill parish and ward.

It constitutes part of Five Villages electoral ward, one of eighteen rural wards in the borough, each comprising one or more parishes.
