= Algarkirk and Sutterton railway station =

Former railway station in Sutterton, Lincolnshire, England

Coordinates: 52°53′26.4″N 0°5′0.2″W

Algarkirk and Sutterton
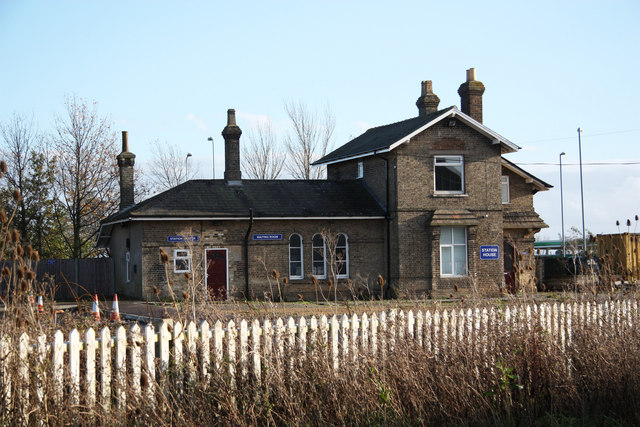
- Former station buildings

General information
- Location: Sutterton, Boston; England
- Platforms: 2

Other information
- Status: Disused

History
- Original company: Great Northern Railway
- Pre-grouping: Great Northern Railway
- Post-grouping: London and North Eastern Railway

Key dates
- 17 October 1848: Station opens as Sutterton, Swineshead and Donnington
- September 1850: Station renamed Algarkirk and Sutterton
- 11 September 1961: Station closes for passengers
- 15 June 1964: closed for goods
Location

Algarkirk and Sutterton railway station was a station which served the villages of Algarkirk and Sutterton in the county of Lincolnshire, England. It was served by trains on the line from Boston to Spalding.

Preceding station	Disused railways	Following station
Kirton	Great Northern Railway; Lincolnshire Loop Line	Surfleet

== History ==
Opened by the Great Northern Railway it became part of the London and North Eastern Railway during the Grouping of 1923, passing on to the Eastern Region of British Railways during the nationalisation of 1948. It was then closed by the British Transport Commission.

== The site today ==
The site today is New View Windows and Conservatories, who are now trying to replenish areas to their original state. This is on the roundabout between the A16 and A17.
