= York Street =

Football stadium in Boston, England

Coordinates: 52°58′36.43″N 0°1′8.82″W

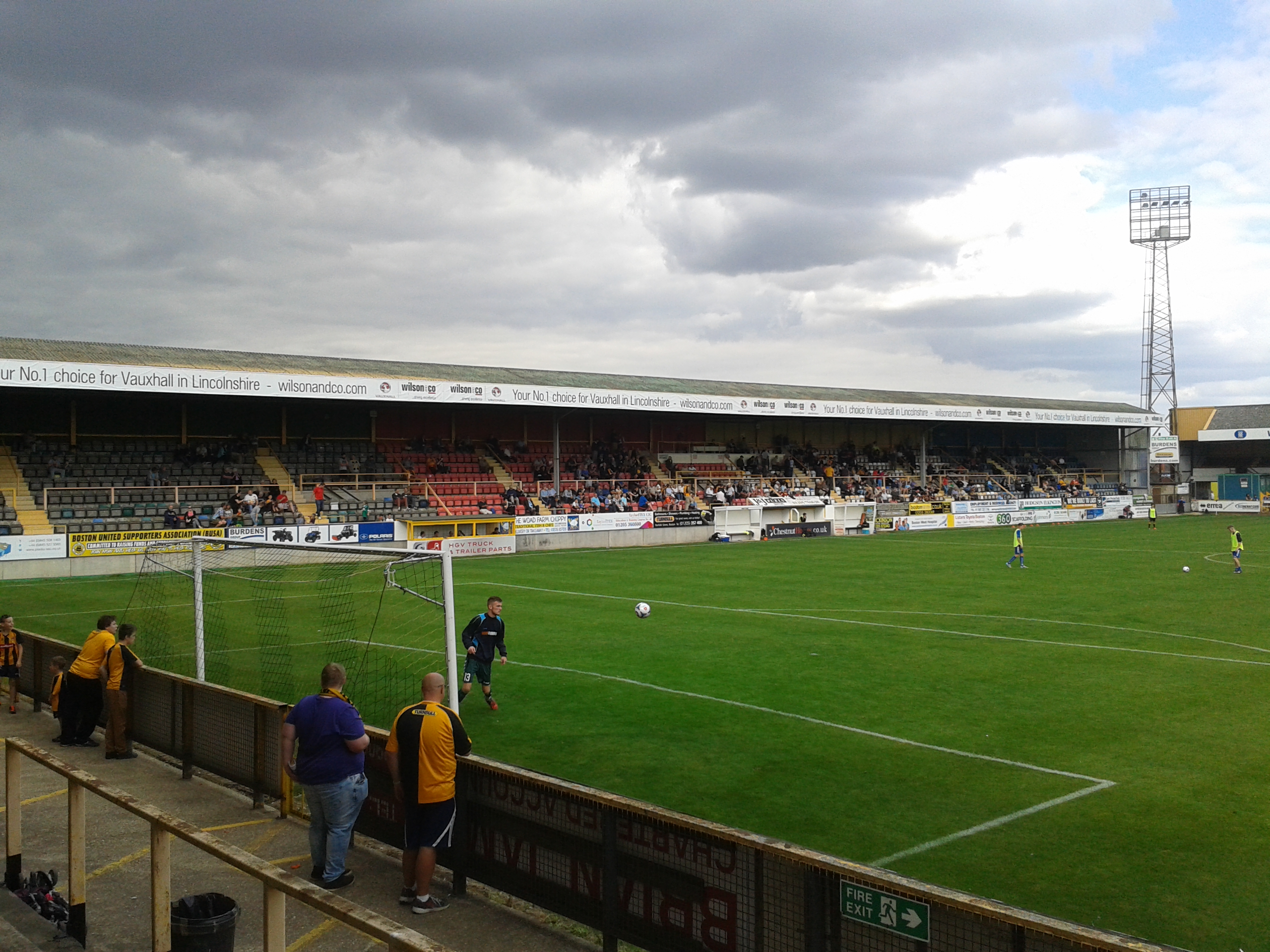
- Interactive map of York Street
- Location: York Street, Boston; PE21 6JN
- Owner: Malkinson Family
- Capacity: 6,643

Construction
- Opened: 1933
- Closed: 2022
- Demolished: 2026

Tenants
- Boston United F.C. (1933–2020); Railway Athletic (2021-22)

York Street, was a football stadium in Boston, England, and was the former home of Boston United. Originally called Shodfriars Lane and latterly for sponsorship reasons the Jakemans Stadium, football was first played on the site since the late 19th century by a variety of Boston teams, but it was only used by Boston United since 1933. In the late 1970s the ground was rebuilt. Although the ground most recently had a maximum capacity of 6,643, the record crowd was 11,000 against Derby County. 10 further attendances of more than 8,000 are on record. Boston United left the York Street ground at the end of the 2019/20 season. Railway Athletic FC played in the stadium in 2021-22, but the land was put up for sale in 2022 and the stadium has since been unused.

In January 2026 plans were approved to build a £24.9m NHS community diagnostic centre (CDC) on the site of the stadium. Demolition work on the site began in March 2026.

== History ==
The ground stood in the centre of the town of Boston since the 19th century, and was given a variety of names since its construction. For 40 years before York Street's long time tenants, Boston United, were founded it was known as 'Main Ridge'.

In the mid-1950s the York Street Stand was built, and the ground's first floodlights were installed. These were first played under in 1955, when over 9,000 fans watched Boston's first floodlit game against Corby Town. The new floodlights, erected in each of the four corners of the ground, allowed the Pilgrims to play in various floodlit competitions.

In 1977 York Street failed an inspection for league grading, leading to local fundraising in 1978 which resulted in new terracing, stands, floodlights, toilets, turnstiles and snack bars.

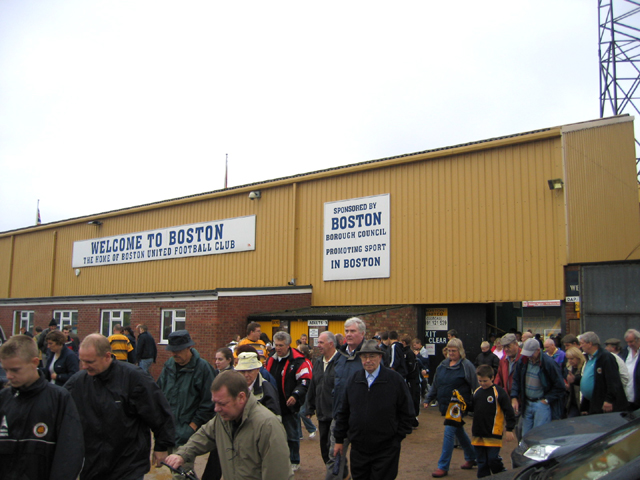
Spectators leave the ground after a match against Rochdale in 2005.

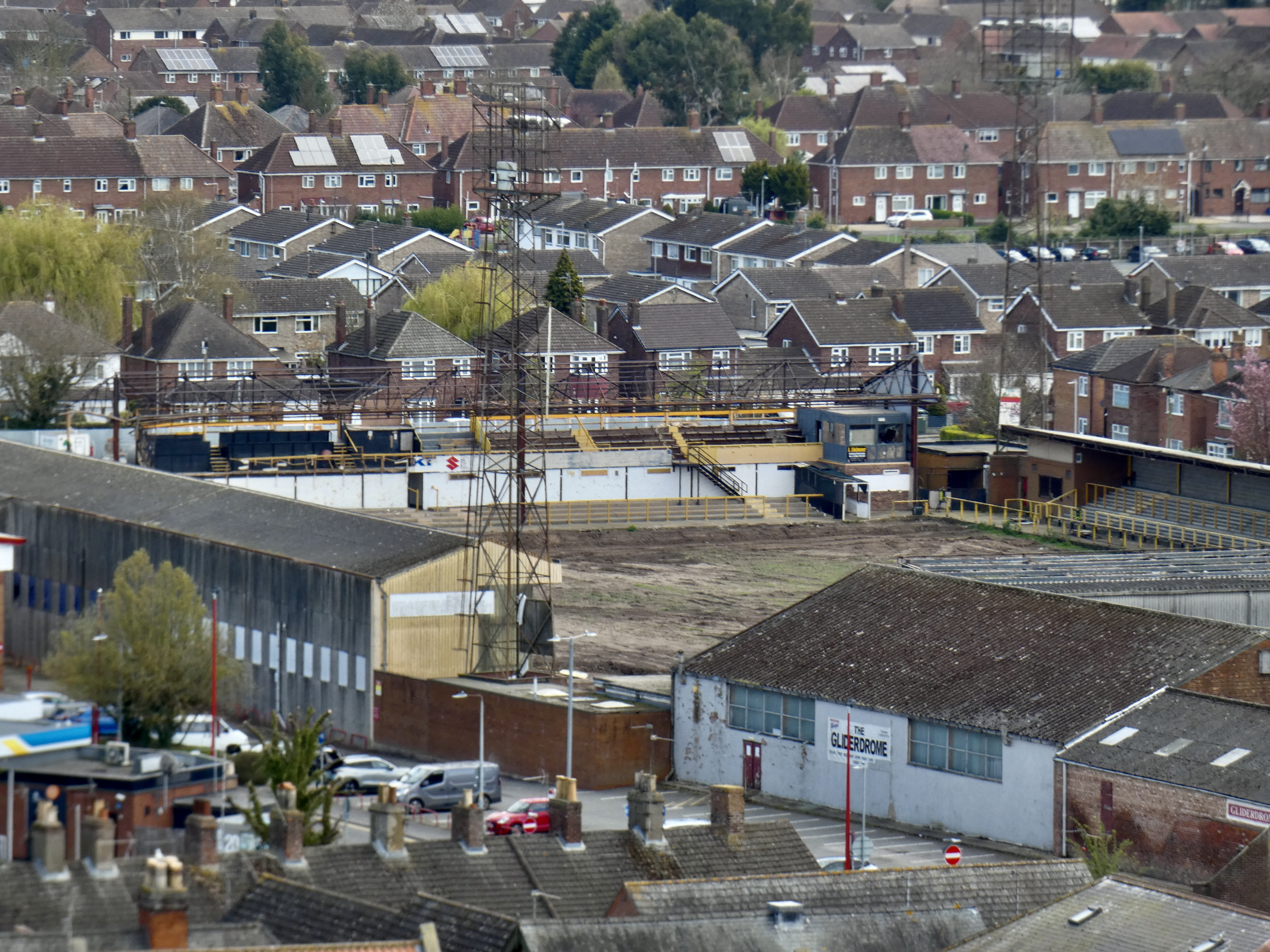
Viewed from Boston Stump in April 2026, just after the start of demolition work

In March 2009 Boston United F.C. announced that the ground had been renamed to 'the Jakemans Stadium', following a sponsorship deal with Sutterton-based Jakemans Confectioners

In August 2021, it was announced that Railway Athletic FC of the Boston & District League would play some matches at York Street. The following year, the stadium was put up for sale and it had since been empty.

In 2026, the Boston Borough Council approved the demolition of the York Street Stadium and the construction of a Community Diagnostic Centre by the United Lincolnshire Teaching Hospitals NHS Trust in its place.

== Other uses ==
The ground had been used for a variety of other purposes besides football matches, including as the club's offices, and for Supporters' Trust meetings. Public meetings were held inside the ground, as well as Community Days and fireworks displays.

York Street held its most recent international match on 5 March 2009. England Under-18 Schoolboys beat Wales Under-18 Schoolboys 3–0, with a pre-match Japanese drum display and half-time cheer-leading routine taking place on the pitch.

== Greyhound racing ==
Independent (unaffiliated to a governing body) greyhound racing took place around the pitch at Shodfriars Lane from 1932 until 1939. The company responsible for bringing greyhounds to the stadium were called the Boston Greyhound Racing Club. The first meeting was held on Wednesday 25 May 1932 and was attended by over 1,000. Due to the outbreak of war the track was forced to close and never re-opened.

== Transport ==
Boston is the nearest railway station to the ground; it is less than 1 mile (1.6 km) away and sign posted throughout the town.
