= Dogdyke railway station =

Station on the former Great Northern Railway

Coordinates: 53.0833°N 0.1952°W

General information
- Location: England
- Line: Boston to Lincoln (GNR)
- Connections: Transhipment point for River Bain and River Witham

Other information
- Status: Closed

History
- Opened: May 1849
- Closed: 1963
- Previous names: Great Northern Railway
Location

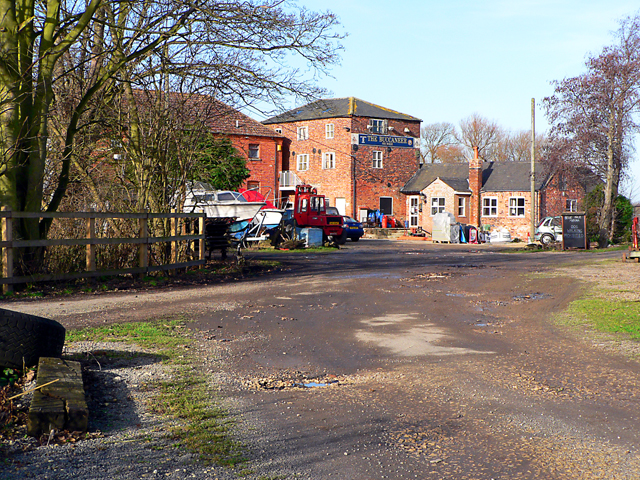
Former Dogdyke station buildings are now a marina and night club

Dogdyke railway station was a station on the former Great Northern Railway between Boston and Lincoln.

The station, and essentially the hamlet of Dogdyke itself, served a transhipment point at the confluence of the rivers Bain and Witham. Principal traffic was agricultural, but also included coals for the nearby Drainage engine whose fuel had always been delivered by water. Before the railway there had been traffic from the Bain and the Horncastle Canal

It served the village of Dogdyke in Lincolnshire, England until closure in 1963. The station was immortalised in 1964 in the song "Slow Train" by Flanders and Swann.

Former Services

Preceding station	Disused railways	Following station
Tattershall	Great Northern Railway; Lincolnshire Loop Line	Langrick

== See also ==
- Dogdyke Engine
