= Five Mile House railway station =

Former railway station in England

Coordinates: 53.2299°N 0.4161°W

Five Mile House
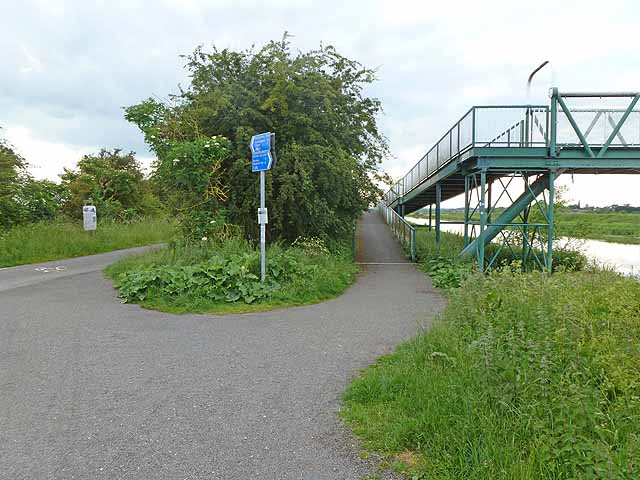
- Five Mile Bridge modern footbridge across the Witham. The cycle track on the left is the old trackbed. The old wooden platforms were a few yards from here.

General information
- Location: Fiskerton, West Lindsey; England
- Grid reference: TF058714
- Platforms: 2

Other information
- Status: Disused

History
- Original company: Great Northern Railway
- Post-grouping: London and North Eastern Railway; Eastern Region of British Railways

Key dates
- 17 October 1848: Opened
- 1 December 1850: Closed
- 1 September 1865: Reopened
- 15 September 1958: Closed to regular services
- 6 September 1964: Closed to all traffic
Location

Five Mile House was a railway station on the Lincolnshire Loop Line which served the village of Fiskerton in Lincolnshire between 1848 and 1964. Situated on the south bank of the River Witham, passengers on the north bank had to use a ferry to reach it. It closed two years after opening due to low traffic, but reopened fifteen years later. Passenger services were withdrawn in 1958, leaving the station open for anglers' excursions until 1964. The Water Rail Way footpath now runs through the site.

== History ==
The station was opened on 17 October 1848 on the south bank of the River Witham near the village of Fiskerton. It was constructed by Peto and Betts civil engineering contractors who, in November 1846, had agreed to construct the line including stations by 28 February 1848. It took its name from a public house near the river which served as a barge inn popular with horse-drawn packets. Two timber-built staggered platforms were provided either side of a crossing which led to a ferry across the river. Users on the north bank of the river were obliged to cross it using the ferry to reach the station, a journey which deterred many potential customers. Lack of traffic resulted in the station closing in 1850, only to reopen fifteen years later when a farmer was granted siding facilities. A footbridge replaced the ferry in 1957 when the latter closed.

Goods traffic was never heavy, and the station was mainly used for transporting potatoes, grain, hay and sugar beet. The station buildings were destroyed by fire in 1919 and were replaced by two small buildings; one was used as an office and the other as a waiting room. The July 1927 timetable saw seven up and five down services, and one Sunday service each way; destinations included Grantham, Skegness, Louth, Horncastle, Doncaster and Peterborough. Regular passenger services were withdrawn on 15 September 1958, but the station remained open until 6 September 1964 for anglers' specials on summer weekends from and to Rotherham Central, Sheffield Victoria and Wadsley Bridge. By September 1964, only one train each way called at the station.

Preceding station	Disused railways	Following station
Washingborough; Line and station closed	Great Northern Railway; Lincolnshire Loop Line	Bardney; Line and station closed

== Present day ==
The timber platforms remained intact until at least the early 1970s. The Water Rail Way footpath now runs through the site.

== Sources ==
- Butt, R. V. J. (October 1995). The Directory of Railway Stations: details every public and private passenger station, halt, platform and stopping place, past and present (1st ed.). Sparkford: Patrick Stephens Ltd. ISBN 978-1-85260-508-7. OCLC 60251199. OL 11956311M.
- Clinker, C.R. (October 1978). Clinker's Register of Closed Passenger Stations and Goods Depots in England, Scotland and Wales 1830-1977. Bristol: Avon-Anglia Publications & Services. ISBN 0-905466-19-5.
- Conolly, W. Philip (2004) [1958]. British Railways Pre-Grouping Atlas and Gazetteer. Hersham, Surrey: Ian Allan Ltd. ISBN 978-0-7110-0320-0.
- Croughton, Godfrey; Kidner, R. W.; Young, Alan (1982). Private and Untimetabled Railway Stations: Halts and Stopping Places. Trowbridge, Wilts.: The Oakwood Press. ISBN 0-85361-281-1.
- Ludlam, A.J. (1995). The Lincolnshire Loop Line (GNR) and the River Witham (Locomotive Papers No. 190). Headington, Oxford: The Oakwood Press. ISBN 0-85361-464-4.
