= Kirton railway station =

Former railway station in Kirton, Lincolnshire, England

Coordinates: 52.9269°N 0.0537°W

Kirton
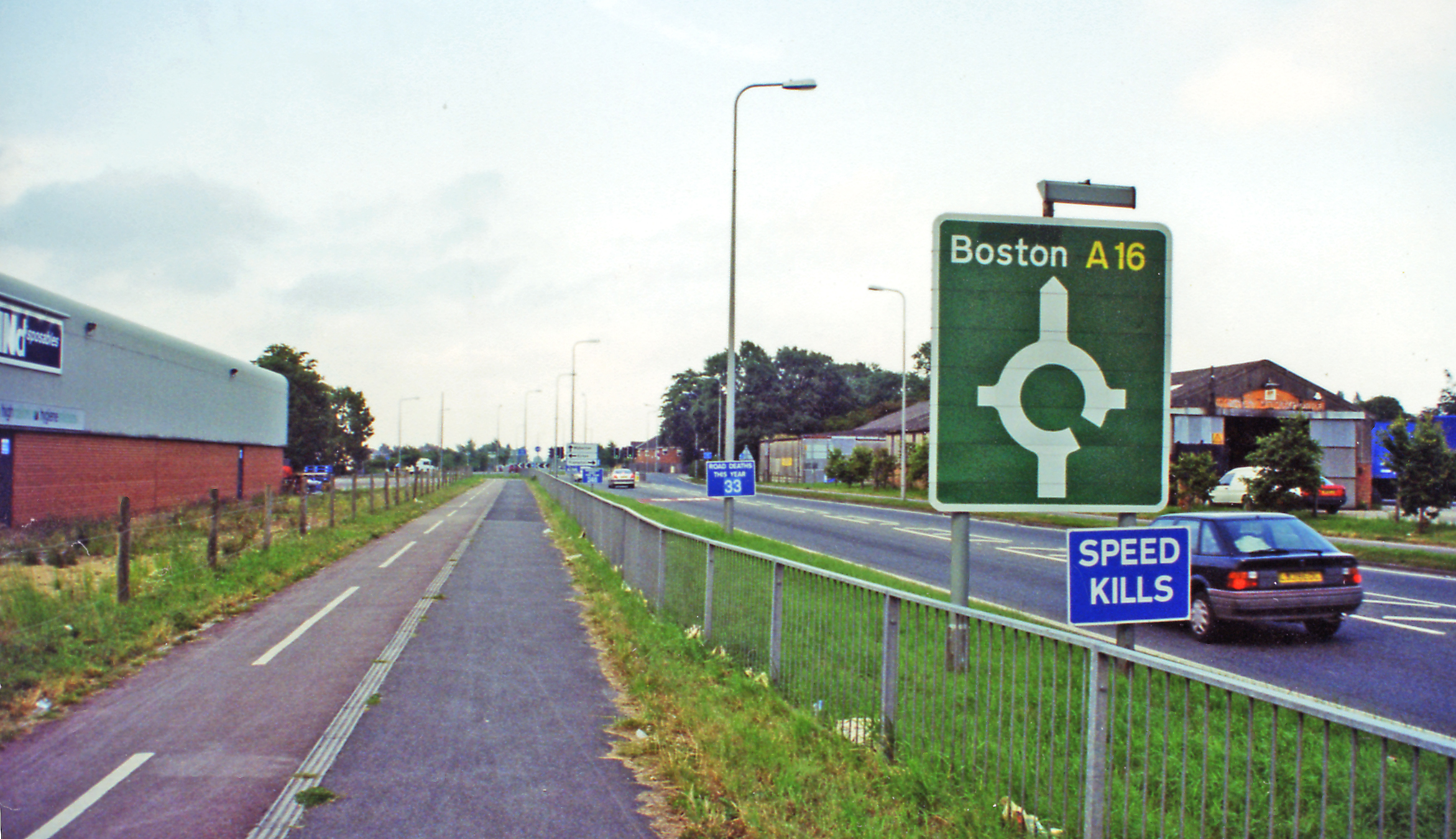
- Former station site, now part of the A16 road between Boston and Spalding

General information
- Location: Kirton-in-Holland, Lincolnshire; England
- Platforms: 2

Other information
- Status: Disused

History
- Original company: Great Northern Railway
- Pre-grouping: Great Northern Railway
- Post-grouping: London and North Eastern Railway

Key dates
- 17 October 1848: Station opens as Sutterton, Swineshead and Donnington
- 11 September 1961: Station closes for passengers
- 15 June 1964: closed for goods
Location

Kirton railway station was a station that served Kirton-in-Holland in Lincolnshire, England. It closed to passenger traffic on 11 September 1961 and freight traffic on 15 June 1964. It was served by trains on the line from Boston to Spalding.

Preceding station	Disused railways	Following station
Boston; Line closed, station open	Great Northern Railway; Lincolnshire Loop Line	Algakirk and Sutterton; Line and station closed
