= Robinson Elsdale =

English privateer and autobiographer

Robinson Elsdale (1744–1783), was an English privateer and autobiographer.

He was the son of Samuel Elsdale (1704–1788) and Mary Elsdale, of Surfleet, Lincolnshire. He was baptised on 25 December 1744 at Surfleet. His sister Mary (1739–1772) was the mother of John Molson who founded the Molson Brewery.

Elsdale entered the Royal Navy as a midshipman, but left early by reason of the slowness of promotion, and served in various privateers cruising against the French, chiefly off the coast of Hispaniola and the west coast of Africa, between 1762 and 1779, when he retired.

For the benefit of his wife he wrote an account of some of the most exciting adventures and experiences which he had met with during his sea life. Those episodes in a life of adventure are told in a fresh, simple, and lively style, and abound in hair-breadth escapes and romantic incidents. The manuscript fell into the hands of Captain Marryat, and was freely used by him in the earlier chapters of The Privateersman (1846), also known as Extracts from the Log of a Privateersman One Hundred Years Ago.

After his retirement from active service Elsdale lived quietly on an estate at Surfleet which had been in his family for many generations. He died on 15 October 1783.

== Family ==
Elsdale married on 31 March 1779 Miss Ann Gibbons, a lady of great beauty and intelligence, by whom he had two sons, Samuel and Robinson.

Samuel Elsdale was educated at Lincoln College, Oxford, graduating B.A. in 1803, M.A. 1809, took holy orders and a fellowship, and became the master of Moulton Grammar School, Lincolnshire, was a frequent contributor to magazines, and the author of a volume of sacred poetry entitled Death, Judgment, Heaven, and Hell; a Poem, with Hymns and other Poems, 1812, 8vo; 3rd ed. 1813. He died on 13 July 1827.

Robinson Elsdale junior (1783–1850) was educated at Uppingham School and Corpus Christi College, Oxford; he took holy orders and a fellowship and became the High Master of Manchester Grammar School.
