= St James Deeping railway station =

Former railway station in Lincolnshire, England

Coordinates: 52.6647°N 0.2559°W

St James Deeping
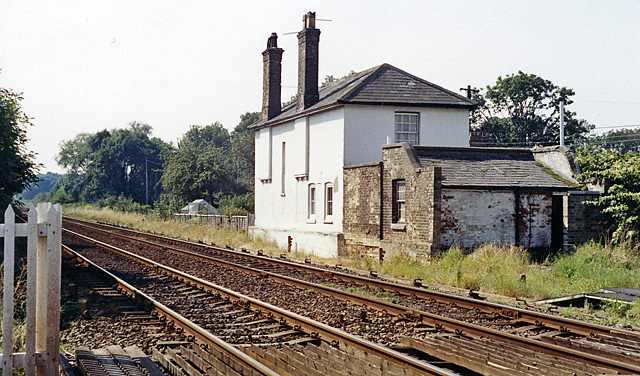
- The station in 1991

General information
- Location: Market Deeping, South Kesteven Lincolnshire; England
- Platforms: 2

Other information
- Status: Disused

History
- Pre-grouping: Great Northern Railway
- Post-grouping: London and North Eastern Railway

Key dates
- 1 August 1849: Opened as St James Deeping
- 1850: Renamed Crowland and St James Deeping
- 1851: Renamed St James Deeping
- 1961: Closed for passengers
- 15 June 1964: closed for freight
Location

St James Deeping is a former railway station which served the village of Deeping St James and town of Market Deeping in Lincolnshire, England. It was on the Lincolnshire Loop Line between Lincoln and Peterborough via Boston and Spalding.

It was also on the Peterborough-Lincoln Line which connected Peterborough to Lincoln, avoiding Boston, via Spalding and is still an active mainline through the station site.

Preceding station	Historical railways	Following station
Littleworth; Line open, station closed	Great Northern Railway; Lincolnshire Loop Line	Peakirk; Line open, station closed
