= Littleworth railway station =

Former railway station in Lincolnshire, England

Coordinates: 52.7210°N 0.2123°W

Littleworth
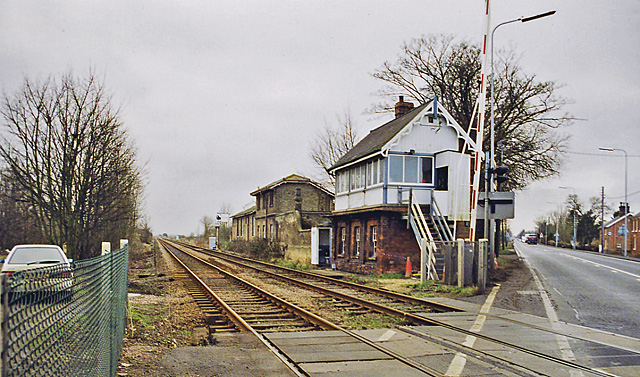
- Remaining buildings to the southwest of the level crossing

General information
- Location: Deeping St Nicholas, South Holland, Lincolnshire; England
- Grid reference: TF208152
- Platforms: 2

Other information
- Status: Disused

History
- Original company: East Lincolnshire Railway
- Pre-grouping: Great Northern Railway
- Post-grouping: LNER

Key dates
- 1848: Opened
- 11 September 1961: Closed for passengers
- 15 June 1964: closed for freight
Location

Littleworth railway station is a former railway station in Deeping St Nicholas, Lincolnshire, on the Peterborough to Lincoln Line. It opened in 1848 and was closed for passengers in 1961.

Some of the station buildings and goods shed are still standing and are used as commercial premises.

The line is still open and is used by passenger services between Peterborough, Spalding and Lincoln.

== History ==
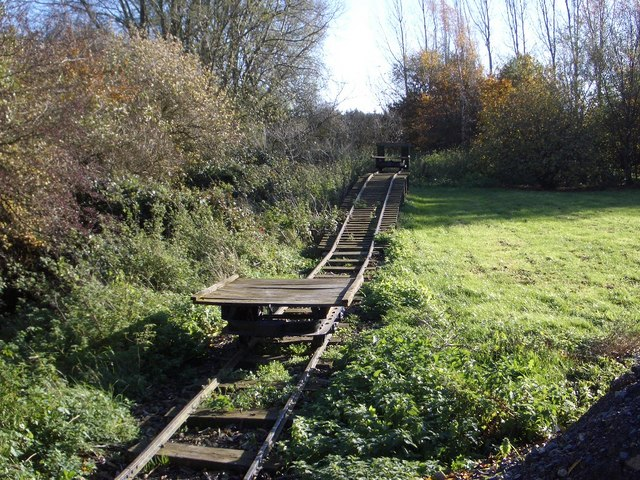
Fragments of Narrow Gauge railway and components preserved at Vine Farm

The line was built in 1848. The station was closed in 1961 but the line through the station remained open for passenger trains until 5 October 1970 and re-opened on 7 June 1971 for Peterborough-Spalding services. The intermediate stations, including Littleworth, were not re-opened.

Much of the goods traffic was agricultural produce, including potatoes, From the Dennis family farms. A Narrow gauge railway was used to bring potatoes in from the fields to a depot across the road from the goods shed. The Narrow gauge line crossed the road at Littleworth, and portions could still be seen in the 1960s. The same family owned the Nocton potato railway, much of whose equipment was re-used for the Lincolnshire Coast Light Railway. The line at Littleworth was the same gauge. A film from the 1930s in the Huntley Film Archive shows an internal combustion locomotive at work.

Preceding station	Disused railways	Following station
Spalding	Great Northern Railway; Lincolnshire Loop Line	St James Deeping

== The future ==
Some residents of Deeping St Nicholas are keen to see the station re-open to serve the village with a commuter service to Peterborough.
