= Peakirk railway station =

Former railway station in Lincolnshire, England

Coordinates: 52.6424°N 0.2733°W

Peakirk
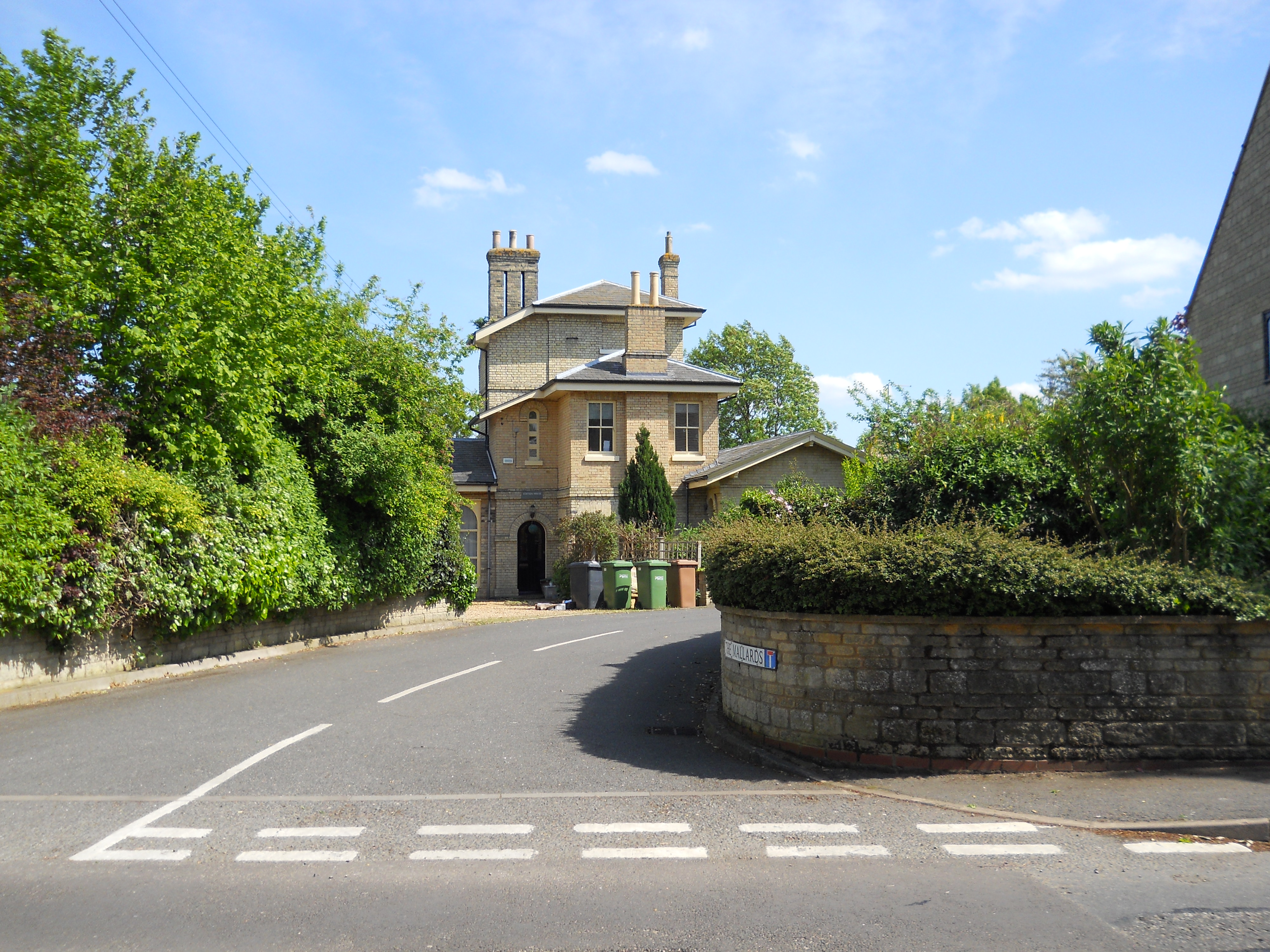
- The site of the station in 2013

General information
- Location: Peakirk, City of Peterborough; England
- Platforms: 2

Other information
- Status: Disused

History
- Pre-grouping: Great Northern Railway
- Post-grouping: London and North Eastern Railway

Key dates
- 17 October 1848: Opened as Peakirk and Crowland
- February 1871: Renamed Peakirk
- 11 September 1961: Closed for passengers
- 27 April 1964: closed for freight
Location

Peakirk railway station served the parish of Peakirk in Cambridgeshire.

The station building was converted into a private residence in the early 1990s. It is notable for having few external alterations, excluding a recent extension. Many of the original features are intact, though the platform and good yards have been removed and been replaced with housing.

Former Services

Preceding station	Disused railways	Following station
St James Deeping	Great Northern Railway; Lincolnshire Loop Line	Peterborough North
