= Langrick railway station =

Former railway station in Lincolnshire, England

Coordinates: 53.0133°N 0.1163°W

Langrick

General information
- Location: Langrick, East Lindsey; England
- Grid reference: TF264478
- Platforms: 2

Other information
- Status: Disused

History
- Original company: Great Northern Railway
- Pre-grouping: Great Northern Railway
- Post-grouping: London and North Eastern Railway

Key dates
- 17 October 1848: Opened
- 17 June 1963: Closed
Location

Langrick railway station was a station in Langrick, Lincolnshire, England, on the line between Boston and Lincoln.

== History ==
Langrick station opened on 17 October 1848. It closed, along with the Lincolnshire Loop Line on 17 June 1963.

The station had two brick platforms immediately east of the level crossing on Ferry Road. The main building stood at right angles to the platform, with the booking office behind the station masters house which led to a waiting room facing onto the "up" platform. The signal box was sited at the east end of the station.

== Accidents and incidents ==
- On 8 March 1937, a passenger train, hauled by Ex-GNR Class H4 2-6-0 No. 126, was derailed due to the poor condition of the track.

== Site ==
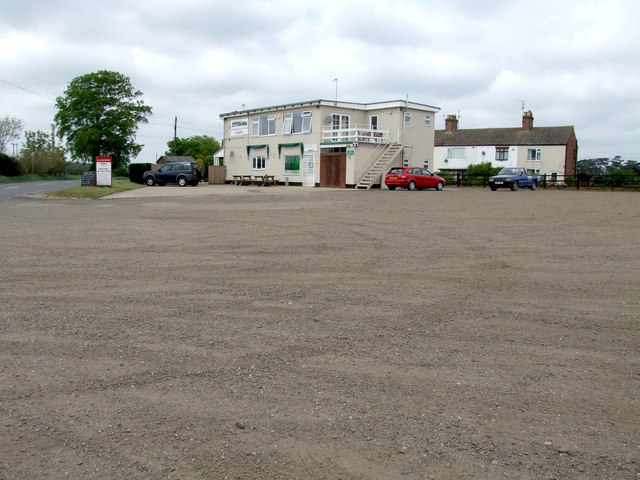
Langrick Station Café

Langrick Station Cafe now occupies what was the ticket office . The possibility that the building now standing is a much-converted original station office . The building does however stand on the same axis as the original, on Ferry Lane, in Langrick.

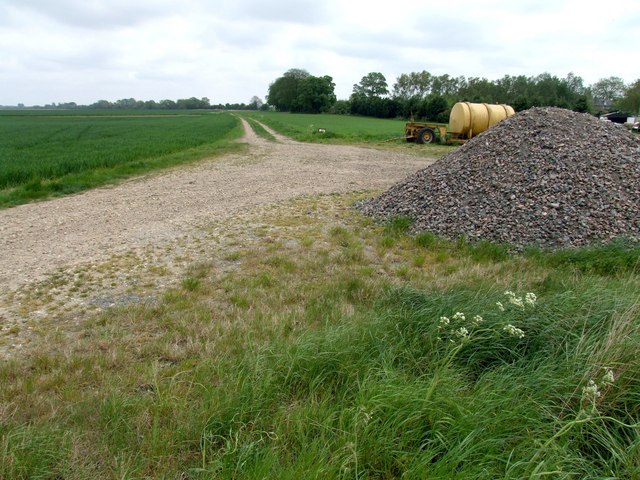
Former Railway line

The Water Rail Way is a Sustrans cycle route (number one) which follows the line of the former Lincoln to Boston railway line, including Langrick.

Former Services

Preceding station	Disused railways	Following station
Dogdyke	Great Northern Railway; Lincolnshire Loop Line	Boston
