= Stixwould railway station =

Former railway station in England

Stixwould
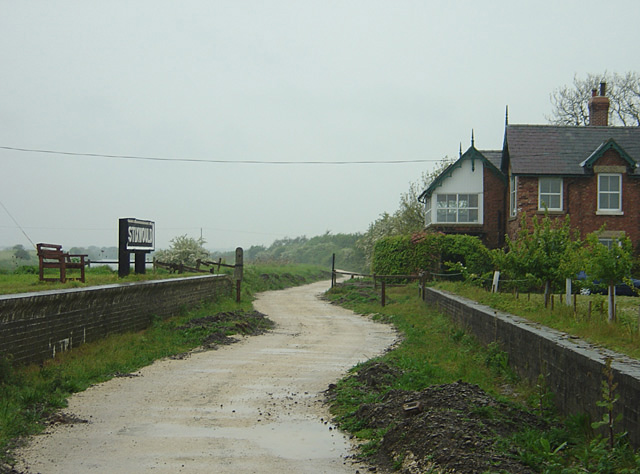
- Stixwould railway station in 2007

General information
- Location: Stixwould, Lincolnshire; England
- Coordinates: 53.16734°N 0.26730°W
- Grid reference: TF158648
- Platforms: 2

Other information
- Status: Disused

History
- Original company: Great Northern Railway
- Post-grouping: LNER

Key dates
- 1848: opened
- 1970: closed (passenger)
Location

Stixwould railway station was a station in Stixwould, Lincolnshire, England.

== History ==
The station was also the site of the Stixwould ferry across the River Witham, which closed in the 1960s.

The station building and signal box have been converted into a private dwelling and guest house called Time Away. The line has become part of the Water Rail Way, supported by Sustrans. The platforms survive and one has a station name board.

== Route ==
Preceding station	Disused railways	Following station
Southrey	Great Northern Railway; Lincolnshire Loop Line	Woodhall Junction

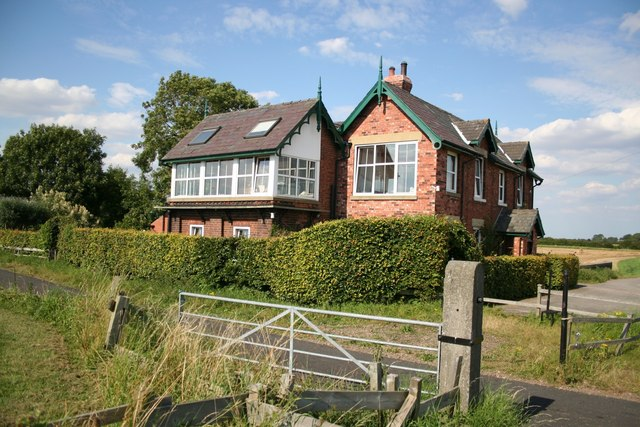
Station house and signal box converted to a house
