= Washingborough railway station =

Former railway station in Lincolnshire, England

Washingborough
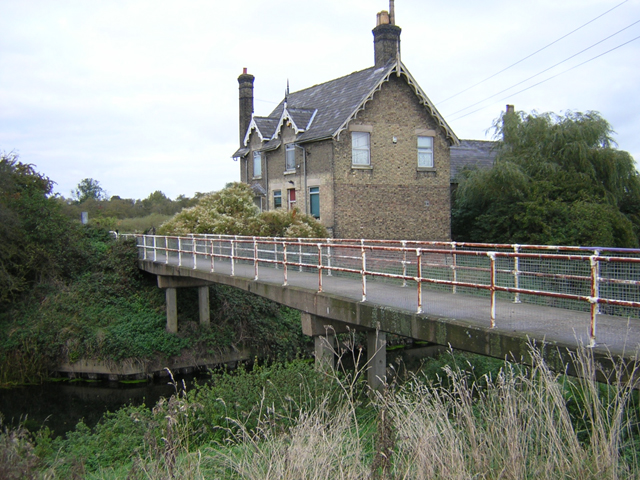
- Former station building

General information
- Location: Washingborough, Lincolnshire; England
- Coordinates: 53.22570°N 0.48042°W
- Grid reference: TF015709
- Platforms: 2

Other information
- Status: Disused

History
- Original company: Great Northern Railway
- Post-grouping: LNER

Key dates
- 17 October 1848: opened
- 29 July 1940: closed (passenger)
Location

Washingborough railway station was a railway station serving the village of Washingborough, Lincolnshire.

== History ==
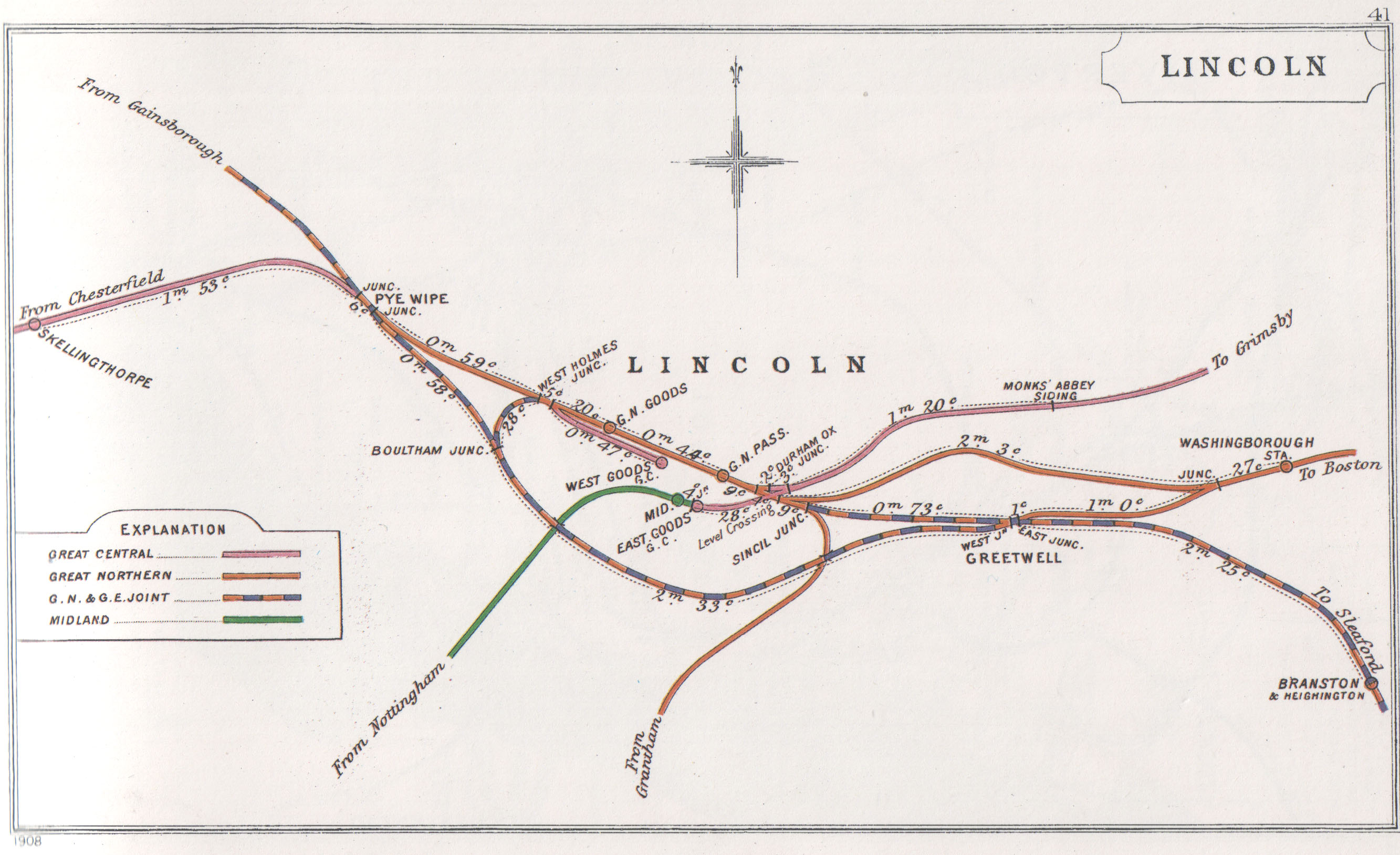
A 1908 Railway Clearing House Junction Diagram showing railways in the vicinity of Washingborough (right)

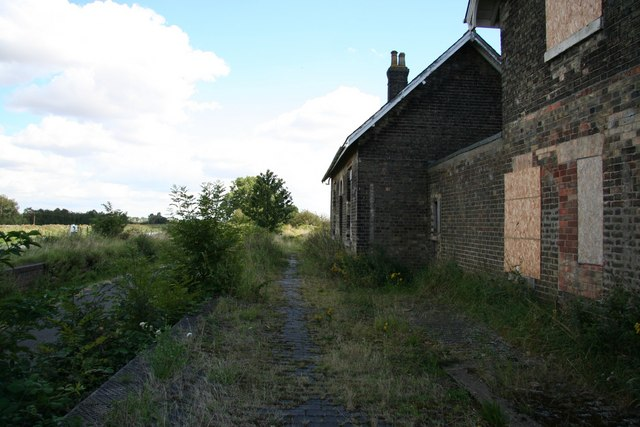
Former platforms

The station was opened by the Great Northern Railway (GNR) on 17 October 1848.

The GNR was a constituent of the London and North Eastern Railway (LNER) which was formed on 1 January 1923; and it was the LNER which closed the station on 29 July 1940.

Former Services

Preceding station	Disused railways	Following station
Lincoln; Line closed, station open	Great Northern Railway; Lincolnshire Loop Line	Five Mile House; Line and station closed
