= St Lawrence's Church, Bardney =

Parish church of Bardney in Lincolnshire, England

Bardney St Lawrence
- Church of St Lawrence, Bardney
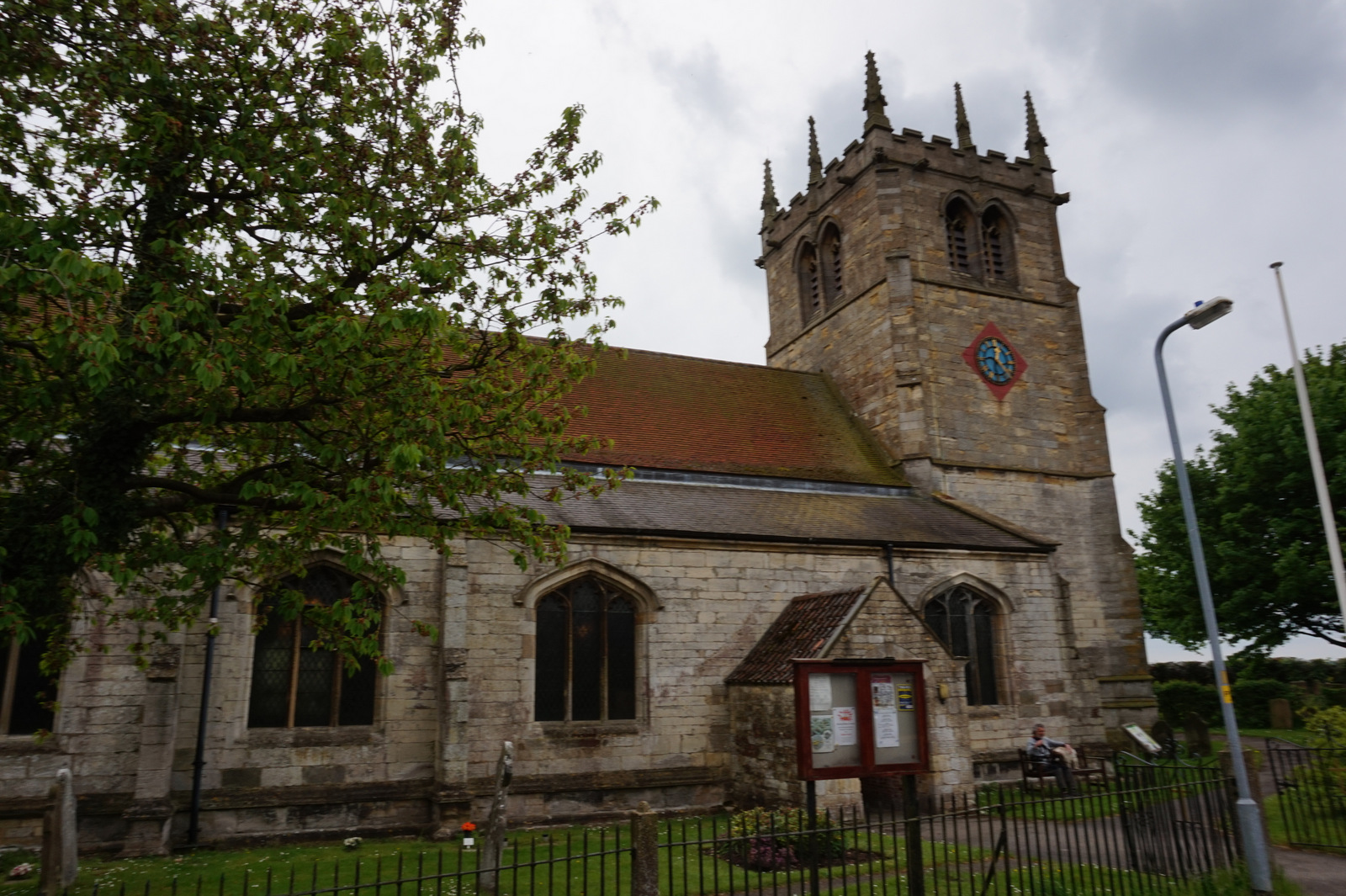
- St Lawrence Church, Bardney
- Bardney St Lawrence
- 53.209657°N 0.325458°W
- OS grid reference: TF 11939 69367
- Location: Bardney, Lincolnshire
- Country: England
- Denomination: Church of England
- Website: www.achurchnearyou.com/church/15030/

History
- Status: Active
- Founded: 1434
- Dedication: Saint Lawrence
- Dedicated: 1434
- Consecrated: 1434

Architecture
- Functional status: Active
- Heritage designation: Grade I
- Designated: 1966
- Architectural type: Gothic Revival
- Completed: 1434

Administration
- Parish: Bardney

St Lawrence's Church is the parish church of Bardney in Lincolnshire, England. It is one of the oldest buildings in the village and the only one with Grade I listed status.

== History ==
St Lawrence's Church was built in the mid to late 15th century. It replaced a former church on the site. As Bardney Abbey functioned until its destruction at the dissolution of the monasteries in 1538, for a period the village was provided with two places of worship. Many fragments from the abbey were incorporated into the fabric of the church. The church was restored in the seventeenth century and again between 1873-79. The church was given grade I listed status in November 1966 by Historic England.

== Architecture and description ==
St Lawrence's is constructed of limestone rubble with ashlar dressings and brick. The bricks are from the same source, and of the same date, as those used to construct Tattershall Castle. Nicholas Antram, in his revised Lincolnshire volume in the Pevsner Buildings of England series, notes stained glass by Charles Eamer Kempe.

== Sources ==
- Hayward, Guy; Mayhew-Smith, Nick (2020). Britain's Pilgrim Places: The first complete guide to every spiritual treasure. Heartwood Publishing. ISBN 978-0-9544767-9-3.
- Pevsner, Nikolaus; Harris, John; Antram, Nicholas (2002). Lincolnshire. The Buildings of England. New Haven, US and London: Yale University Press. ISBN 0-300-09620-8.
- Willsdon, Clare A. P. (2000). Mural Painting in Britain 1840-1940: Image and Meaning. Oxford University Press. ISBN 978-0-19-817515-5.
