= Southrey =

Village in Lincolnshire, England

Coordinates: 53.187125°N 0.298440°W

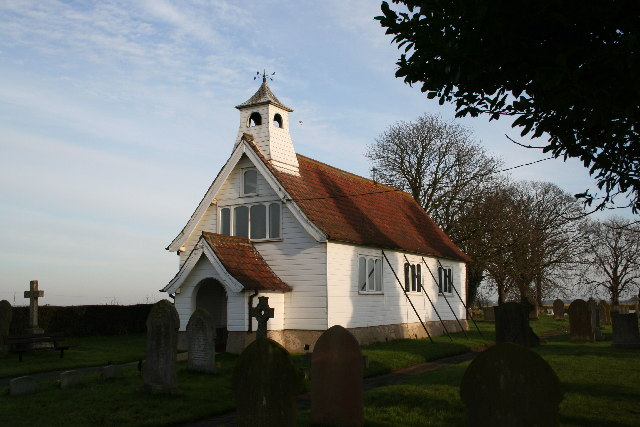
- Church of St John the Divine, Southrey

- Location within Lincolnshire
- OS grid reference: TF137669
  - London: 120 mi (190 km) S
- Civil parish: Bardney
- District: West Lindsey
- Shire county: Lincolnshire
- Region: East Midlands
- Country: England
- Sovereign state: United Kingdom
- Post town: Lincoln
- Postcode district: LN3
- Police: Lincolnshire
- Fire: Lincolnshire
- Ambulance: East Midlands
- UK Parliament: Gainsborough

Southrey is a village in the civil parish of Bardney in the West Lindsey district of Lincolnshire, England, and approximately 2 miles (3 kilometres) south-east from Bardney.

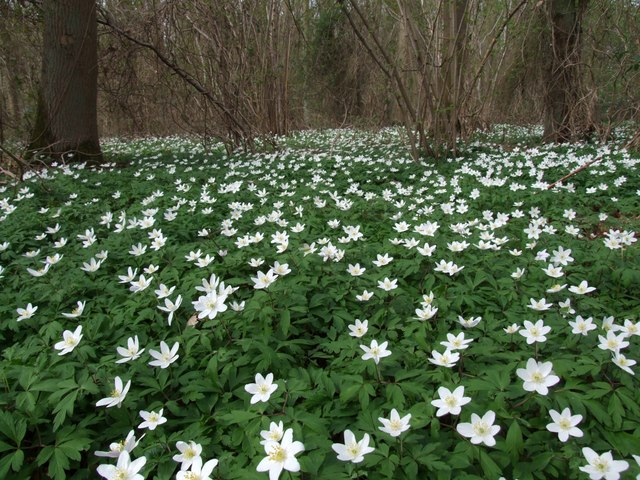
Southrey Woods

In the 1086 Domesday Book Southrey is listed as "Sutrei", comprising 11 households.

The little church dedicated to Saint John the Divine was built in 1898.

Southrey Wood Butterfly Reserve is managed by Butterfly Conservation. Southrey Woods cover 22 acres (9 hectares) and are part of Bardney Limewoods, a Site of Special Scientific Interest

Southrey railway station opened in 1848 and closed in 1970.
