= Tattershall railway station =

Former railway station in England

Coordinates: 53.0954°N 0.2037°W

Tattershall
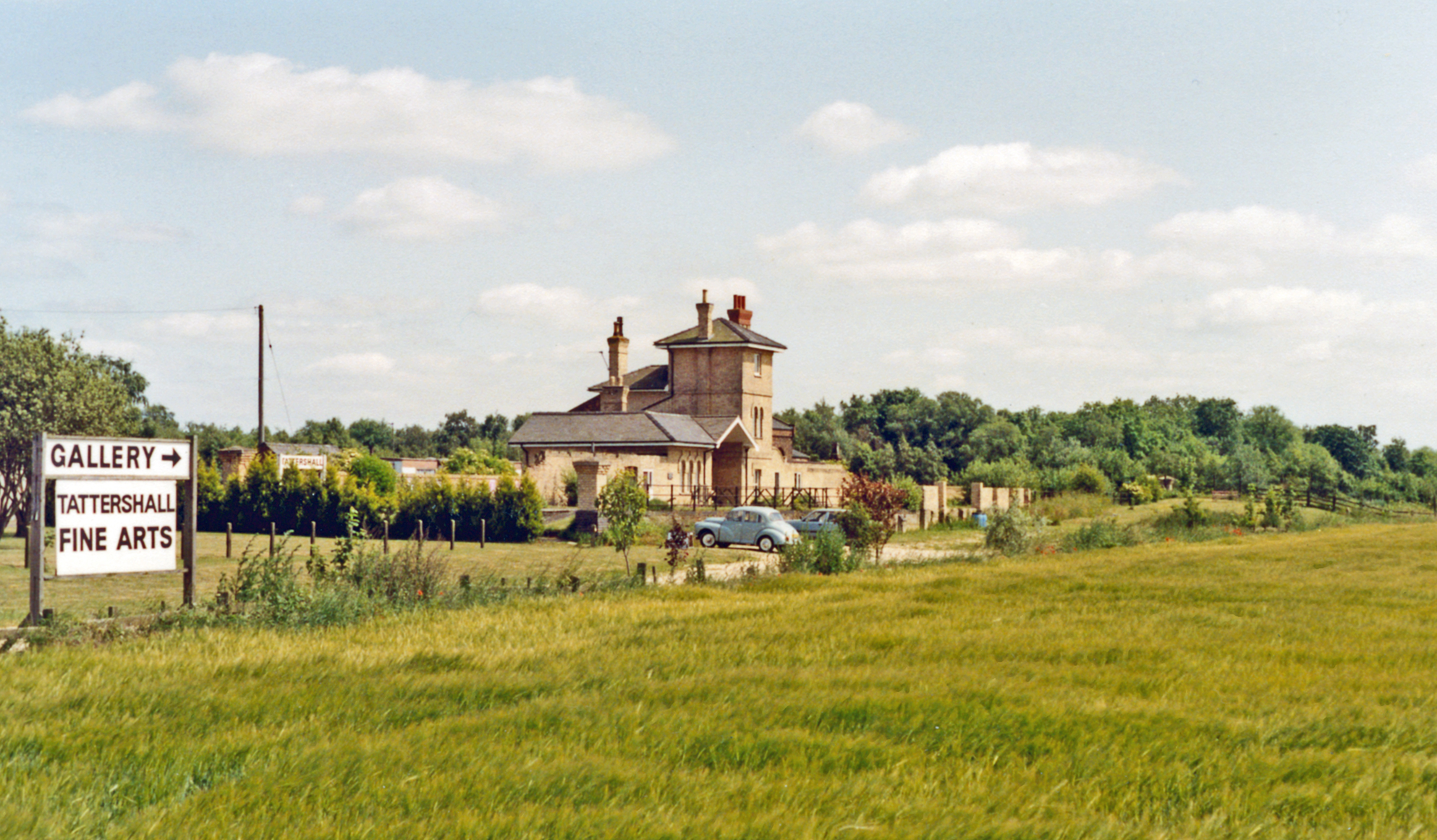
- The station in 1992

General information
- Location: England
- Grid reference: TF203568
- Platforms: 2

Other information
- Status: Disused

History
- Original company: Great Northern Railway (Great Britain)

Key dates
- 17 October 1848: Opened
- 17 June 1963: Closed
Location

Tattershall railway station was a station in Tattershall, Lincolnshire. It was closed in 1963. It is now an art gallery.

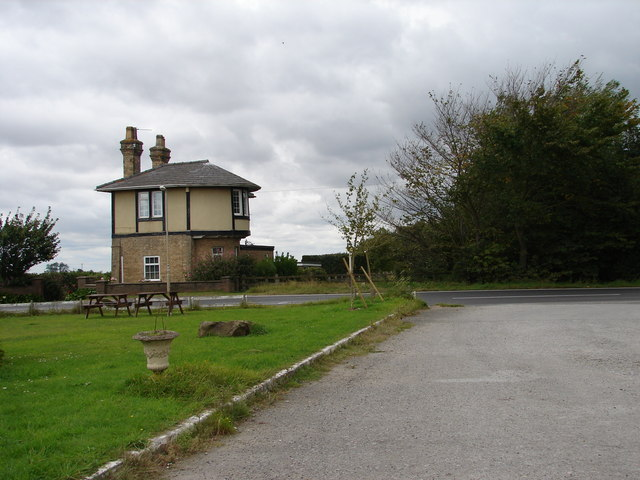
Former crossing keepers crossing adjacent to the station

Preceding station	Disused railways	Following station
Woodhall Junction	Great Northern Railway; Lincolnshire Loop Line	Dogdyke
