= Surfleet railway station =

Former railway station in Lincolnshire, England

Coordinates: 52.8419°N 0.1219°W

Surfleet railway station was a station in Surfleet, Lincolnshire, England. It closed to passenger traffic on 11 September 1961.

The rail line is now the A16 road, and no trace of the station can be found.

Preceding station	Disused railways	Following station
Algarkirk & Sutterton	Great Northern Railway; Lincolnshire Loop Line	Spalding
