= Southrey railway station =

Former railway station in England

Southrey
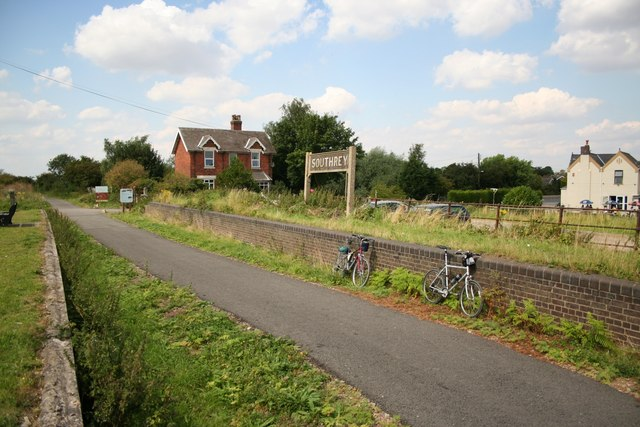
- Former platforms at Southrey railway station

General information
- Location: Southrey, Lincolnshire; England
- Coordinates: 53.18211°N 0.29855°W
- Grid reference: TF138663
- Platforms: 2

Other information
- Status: Disused

History
- Original company: Great Northern Railway
- Post-grouping: LNER

Key dates
- 17 October 1848: opened
- 5 October 1970: closed
Location

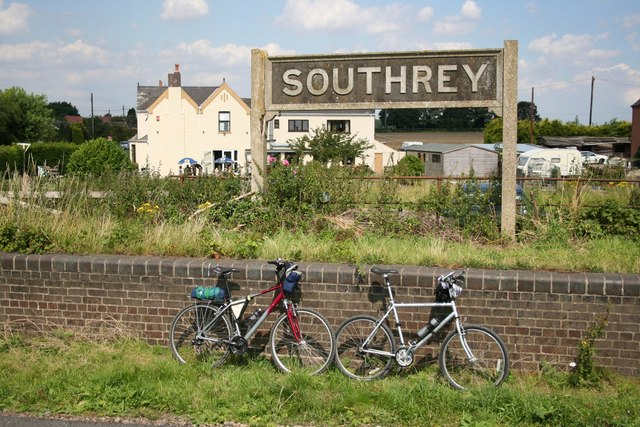
Former platform sign

Southrey railway station is a former station in Southrey, Lincolnshire.

== History ==
The station was opened on 17 October 1848 as part of the new 58 miles (93 km) Lincolnshire Loop Line, from Peterborough to Lincoln via Spalding and Boston. This line was authorised as part of the London and York Railway bill, which received Royal assent on 26 June 1846. The Great Northern Railway began construction of the loop line in 1847.

The station closed on 5 October 1970.

== Route ==
Preceding station	Disused railways	Following station
Bardney	Great Northern Railway; Lincolnshire Loop Line	Stixwould
