= Sutterton =

Village and civil parish in Lincolnshire, England

Coordinates: 52.89363°N 0.08161°W

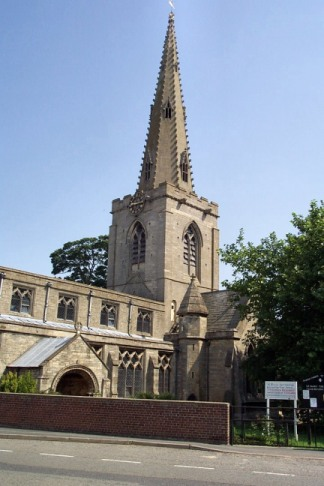
- St. Mary the Blessed Virgin Church, Sutterton

- Location within Lincolnshire
- Population: 1,124 (2001)
- OS grid reference: TF283357
  - London: 95 mi (153 km) S
- Shire county: Lincolnshire
- Region: East Midlands
- Country: England
- Sovereign state: United Kingdom
- Post town: BOSTON
- Postcode district: PE20
- Dialling code: 01205
- Police: Lincolnshire
- Fire: Lincolnshire
- Ambulance: East Midlands

Sutterton is a village and civil parish in the Borough of Boston in Lincolnshire, England, approximately 6 miles (10 km) south-west of Boston. The population of the parish at the 2021 census was 1,769, up from 1,585 in 2011.

Sutterton parish church is dedicated to St Mary the Blessed Virgin. The village has a post office and general store, one public house and restaurant, a fish-and-chip shop, a garden centre, a veterinary practice, a doctors' practice and a village hall used in conjunction with the primary school. Close to the east is Algarkirk, with which Sutterton shares Sutterton Fourfields Primary School.

== Governance ==
The village is one of eighteen parishes which forms part of the Borough of Boston. The parish forms part of the 'Five Villages' electoral ward.

Before local government reorganisation in 1974, the parish was part of the Boston Rural District in the Parts of Holland division of Lincolnshire.

== Transport ==
Sutterton is near the junction of the A16 and A17 roads and on the B1397. The Spalding bypass opened as the 'Spalding-Sutterton Improvement' in 1995.

The contract was given to May Gurney for £4,402,863 in June 1993 for 3 miles. Work started in July 1993. The bypass was opened on Friday 30 June 1995 by Lawrie Haynes, chief of the Highways Agency.

Until its closure in 1961, the village was served by Algarkirk and Sutterton railway station on the Spalding to Boston line.
