= Woodhall Junction railway station =

Former railway station in Lincolnshire, England

Coordinates: 53.1424°N 0.2419°W

Woodhall Junction
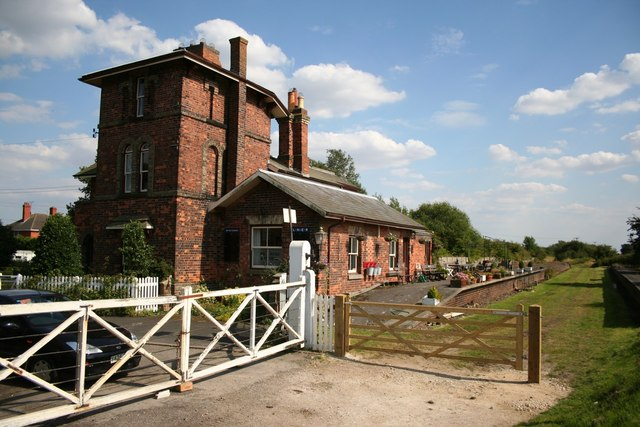
- Woodhall Junction station building and platforms

General information
- Location: Kirkstead, East Lindsey, Lincolnshire; England
- Platforms: 2

Other information
- Status: Disused

History
- Pre-grouping: GNR
- Post-grouping: LNER; Eastern Region of British Railways

Key dates
- 1848: Opened
- 1970: Closed for passengers
- 1971: closed completely
Location

Woodhall Junction railway station (previously Kirkstead railway station) is a former station in Woodhall, Lincolnshire. It served as a junction where several different lines met, none of which are still open.

The station opened as Kirkstead (Kirkstead and Horncastle according to the notice in "The Times") on 17 October 1848 as part of the "Lincolnshire Loop Line" between Lincoln and Boston which largely followed the course of the River Witham.

A branch line was opened from Kirkstead to Horncastle via Woodhall Spa by the Horncastle Railway on 11 August 1855 by which time the station was known as Kirkstead.

The Kirkstead and Little Steeping Railway, known locally as the "New Line", opened in 1913 leaving the Loop Line just south of Woodhall Junction and cut across the fens to Midville allowing faster journey times to Skegness.

The renaming of the station from Kirkstead to Woodhall Junction in 1922 was an attempt to increase the profile of Woodhall Spa as a holiday destination.

The station was host to a LNER camping coach for the 1935 season.

The lines through the station closed at different times:

- The branch line to Horncastle closed to passengers on 13 September 1954.
- The Lincolnshire Loop Line route from Lincoln to Boston via Tattershall closed to passengers on 17 June 1963.
- The station closed to passengers on 5 October 1970 when the Lincoln Central to Firsby via Midville was closed to passengers.
- On 5 April 1971 the Goods Service between Lincoln - Bardney - Woodhall Junction and Horncastle was withdrawn - the last line to stay open through the station.

It is now a private residence, but the platforms and former goods yard are clearly still visible

Former Services

Preceding station	Disused railways	Following station
Stixwould	Great Northern Railway; Lincolnshire Loop Line	Tattershall
Terminus	Great Northern Railway; Kirkstead and Little Steeping Railway	Coningsby
Terminus	Great Northern Railway; Horncastle Railway	Woodhall Spa
