= Peterborough railway station =

Railway station in Cambridgeshire, England

Peterborough
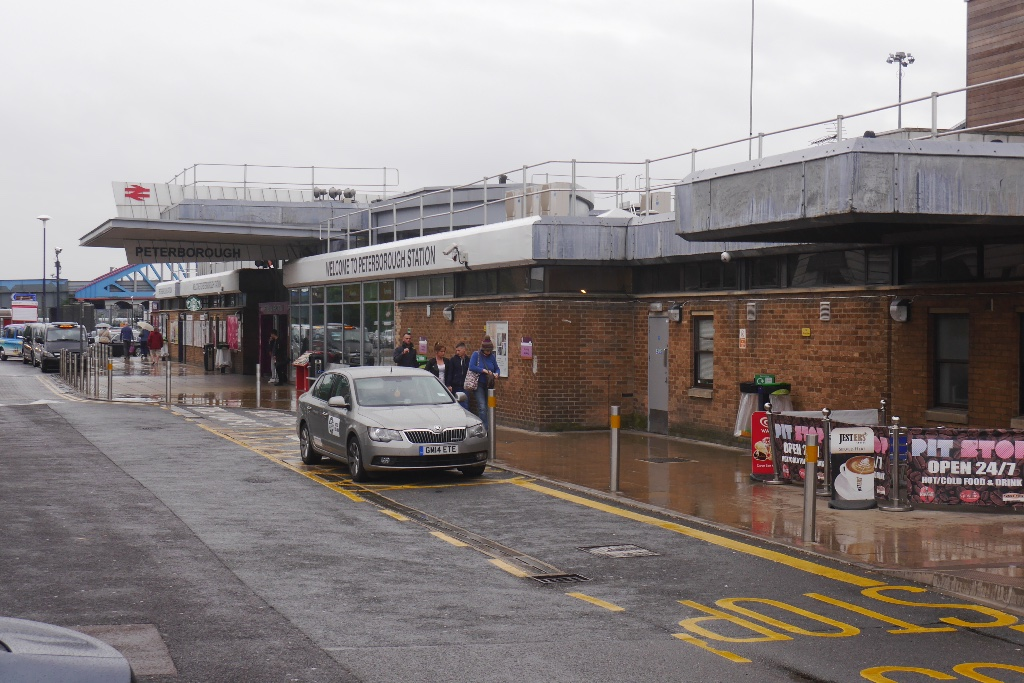

General information
- Location: Peterborough, City of Peterborough, Cambridgeshire; England
- Coordinates: 52°34′29″N 0°15′01″W
- Grid reference: TL186988
- Manager: London North Eastern Railway
- Platforms: 7
- Tracks: 9

Other information
- Station code: PBO
- Classification: DfT category B

Key dates
- August 1850: Opened

Passengers
- 2020–21: ▼1.089 million
- Interchange: ▼0.145 million
- 2021–22: ▲3.720 million
- Interchange: ▲0.548 million
- 2022–23: ▲4.519 million
- Interchange: ▲0.773 million
- 2023–24: ▲4.721 million
- Interchange: ▲0.870 million
- 2024–25: ▲5.300 million
- Interchange: ▲0.960 million
Location
Notes
- Passenger statistics from the Office of Rail and Road

Peterborough railway station serves the cathedral city of Peterborough, Cambridgeshire, England. It is sited 76 miles 29 chains (122.9 km) north of London King's Cross. The station is a major interchange serving both the north–south East Coast Main Line, as well as long-distance and local east–west services. The station is managed by London North Eastern Railway. Ticket gates came into use at the station in 2012.

== History ==
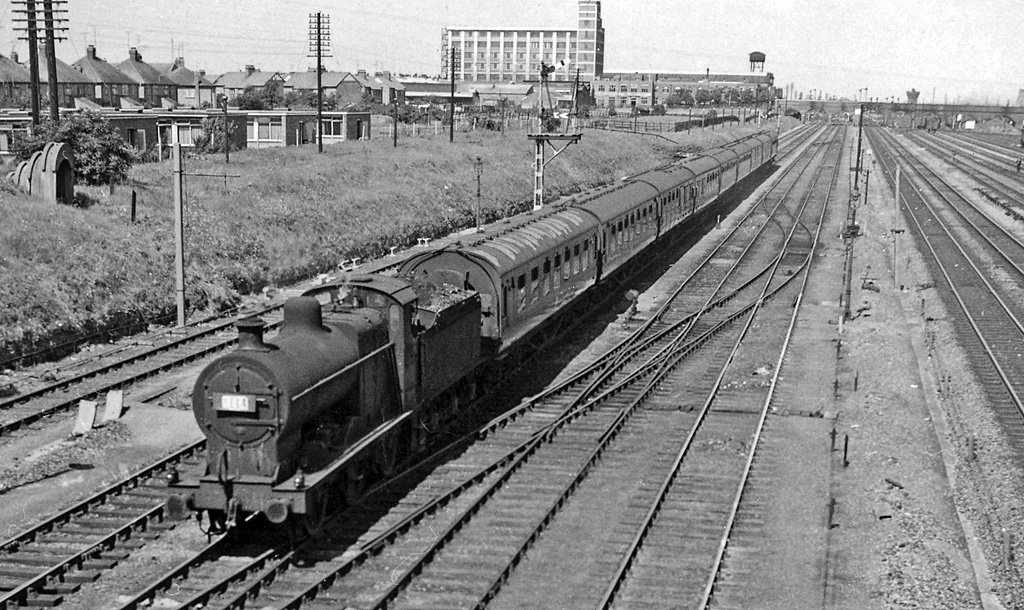
Derby – Lowestoft holiday express approaching by the Midland's Melton Mowbray line in 1962

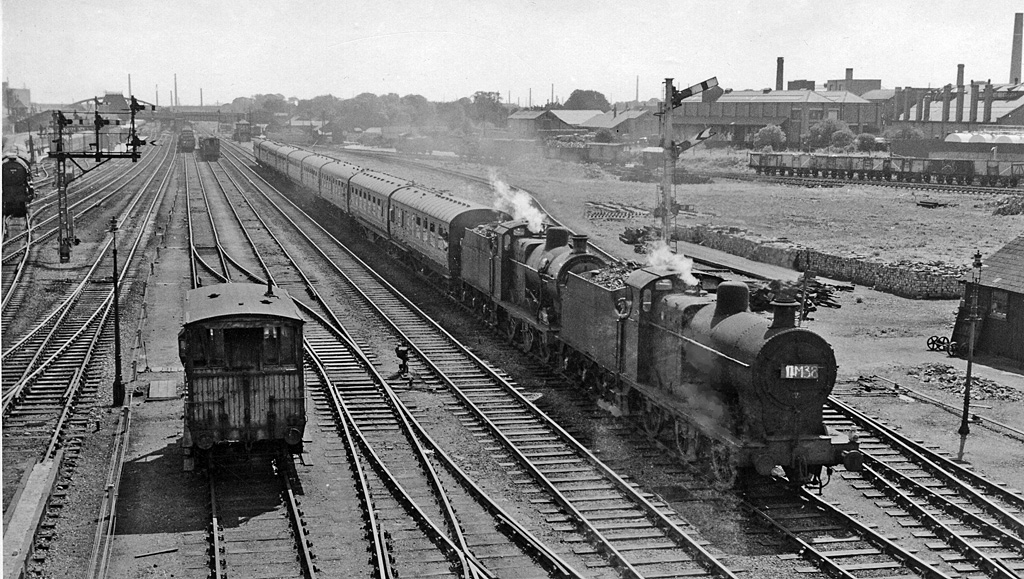
View southward, towards Peterborough North station from Spital Bridge in 1962

There have been a number of railway stations in Peterborough: Peterborough East (1845–1966), the current station which opened in 1850 (previously known by various names including Peterborough North); and briefly Peterborough Crescent (1858–1866).

Peterborough was the site of the first mast to be installed as part of the ECML electrification project, which is located behind platform 1.

=== Openings ===
Peterborough East opened on 2 June 1845 along with the Ely to Peterborough Line built by Eastern Counties Railway (ECR) and the Northampton and Peterborough Railway built by the London and Birmingham Railway, both of which provided routes to London. The Syston and Peterborough Railway by Midland Railway was opened in 1846. On 7 August 1862, the ECR became part of the Great Eastern Railway (GER).

The Great Northern Railway (GNR) arrived in Peterborough with the opening of the major portion of its "loop line" between Peterborough, Spalding, Boston and Lincoln, which opened on 17 October 1848; at first GNR trains used the ECR station at Peterborough East. During the construction of the GNR line south to London, it was decided that the GNR would need their own station at Peterborough; this was decided upon in December 1849, and opened on 7 August 1850 together with the new line, which originally terminated at Maiden Lane, the permanent London terminus at King's Cross not being ready until 14 October 1852. The GNR's Peterborough station is the current station, but it has had several names: originally simply Peterborough, it later became Peterborough Priestgate, then Peterborough Cowgate in 1902, reverting to Peterborough in 1911.

On 1 January 1923 the GER and GNR became constituents of the London and North Eastern Railway (LNER), which found itself with two similarly named stations in Peterborough; to distinguish them, they were given new names on 1 July 1923: the ex-GER station became Peterborough East, and the ex-GNR station Peterborough North. After Peterborough East closed on 6 June 1966, Peterborough North once again became Peterborough, the name by which it is still known.

The Great Northern Railway heading north to Grantham and Doncaster (the Towns Line) opened in 1853 using the GNR station. This line was built alongside the Midland Railway as far as Helpston, resulting in adjacent but separate level crossings at various places, including the Crescent level crossings in Peterborough city centre.

Interchange between Peterborough East and the GNR station was inconvenient, so on 1 February 1858 the Midland Railway opened Peterborough Crescent station, a short distance from the GNR station and close to the level crossing of the same name. Some GER trains were working through to the GNR Station by 1863. and the Crescent station closed on 1 August 1866 when Midland Railway trains began using the GNR station instead.

The Midland and Great Northern Joint Railway (M&GNR) branch to Wisbech and Sutton Bridge opened in 1866. To access this line trains headed north and diverged left at Westwood junction, then continued north adjacent to the Midland Railway line but gaining height, then curved east and bridged over the Midland line, the GNR line and Lincoln Road and headed off towards Eye Green along approximately the route of the current A47 Soke Parkway.

Services to Rugby (by the London and North Western Railway from Peterborough East) and to Leicester (by the GNR from their Station) started in 1879 when the London and North Western Railway (LNWR) built a line from Yarwell junction near Wansford and Seaton linking the Northampton and Peterborough Railway and the Rugby and Stamford Railway. Also the Fletton curve via Woodston to Orton Waterville by the GNR.

In 1913 the two troublesome Crescent level crossings were finally abolished when Crescent Bridge was opened.

=== Train services in 1910 ===
Rail services from the station were at their peak in 1910, before economies were made during World War I, most of which were never reversed.

The express services calling at Peterborough were mainly those between London and Leeds or York, but there were also through coaches to Grimsby via Spalding and Boston, to Cromer via the M&GNR line, to Sheffield Victoria and Manchester London Road via Retford and the Great Central line, and to Hull, Halifax, Blackburn, Harrogate and Bradford via Doncaster.

Bradford trains used a direct route either using the GNR line via Morley Top, or the LYR line via Thornhill.

Most trains between London and Newcastle, and further north, passed through Peterborough without stopping, so it was usually necessary to change at Doncaster or York.

In 1910, the GNR were still running trains to Leicester via Wansford and Seaton, in direct competition with the Midland Railway which ran via Stamford. The GNR route and times were competitive but in 1910 they offered only three trains compared to six by the Midland Railway, and they did not serve any significant population centres en route.

Services to Northampton and Rugby ran from the East station.

=== Engine sheds ===
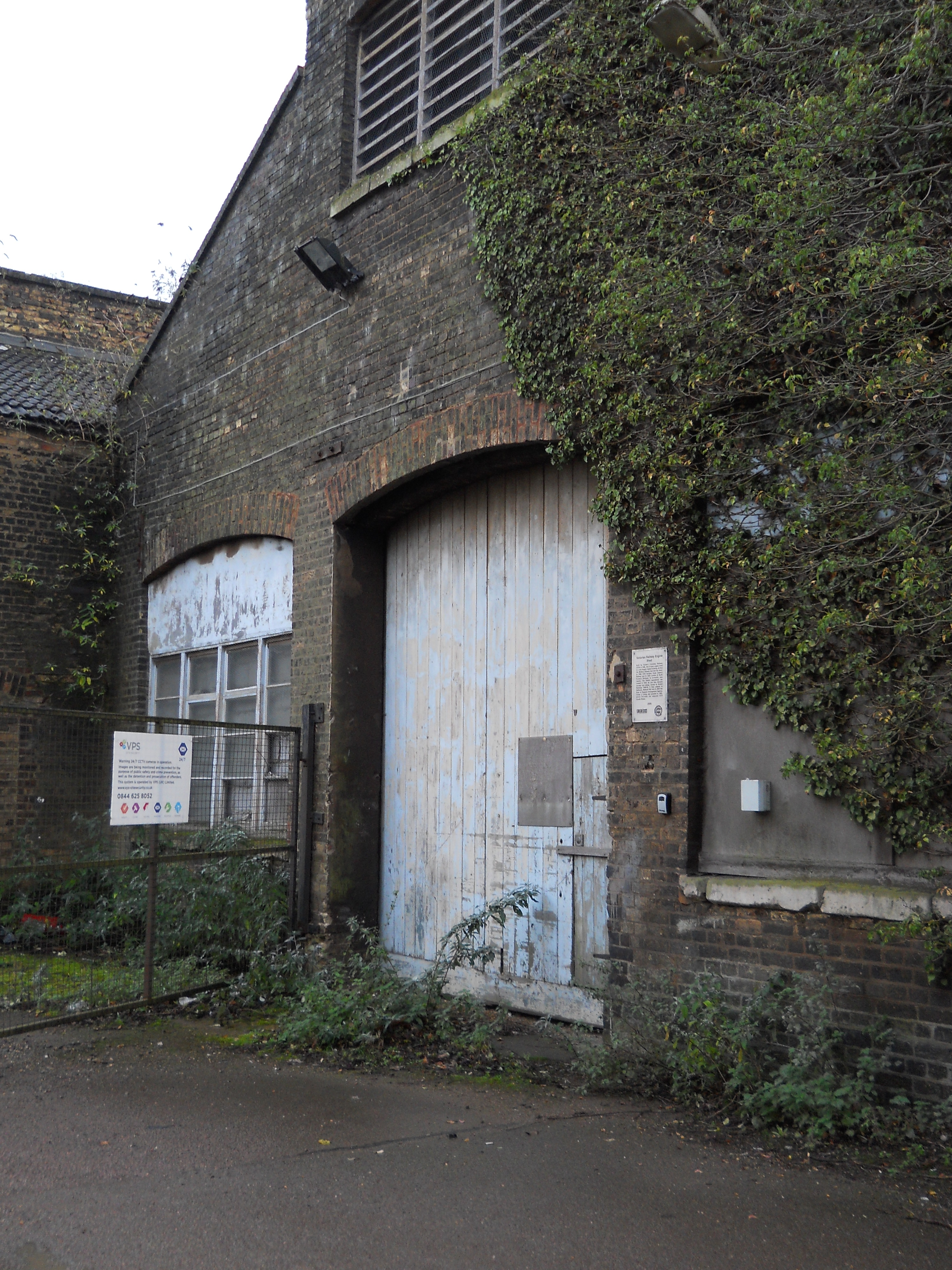
Former Great Eastern engine shed.

Each of the pre 1923 companies had a local locomotive shed:

- The first steam shed is the Great Eastern's 1846 shed, just to the east of its East station. It was a 4-road shed. The shed is now used by City Council offices, as part of the Fletton Quays development.
- The Great Northern's New England shed had 9 engine roads. Construction of a new GB Railfreight depot, beside their New England House offices, began in November 2022 and opened in 2023.
- The Midland Railway's 2-road Spital Bridge shed opened in 1872 and closed in February 1960. It had a 70 ft (21 m) high concrete coaling tower, which was demolished on 20 March 1960 to make way for offices, a workshop and stores. The steam sheds were replaced by a diesel fuelling point at Spital Bridge.
- The London and North Western Railway had a 6-road shed from 1885 to 1932, which is now the site of the Nene Valley station.

=== Closures ===
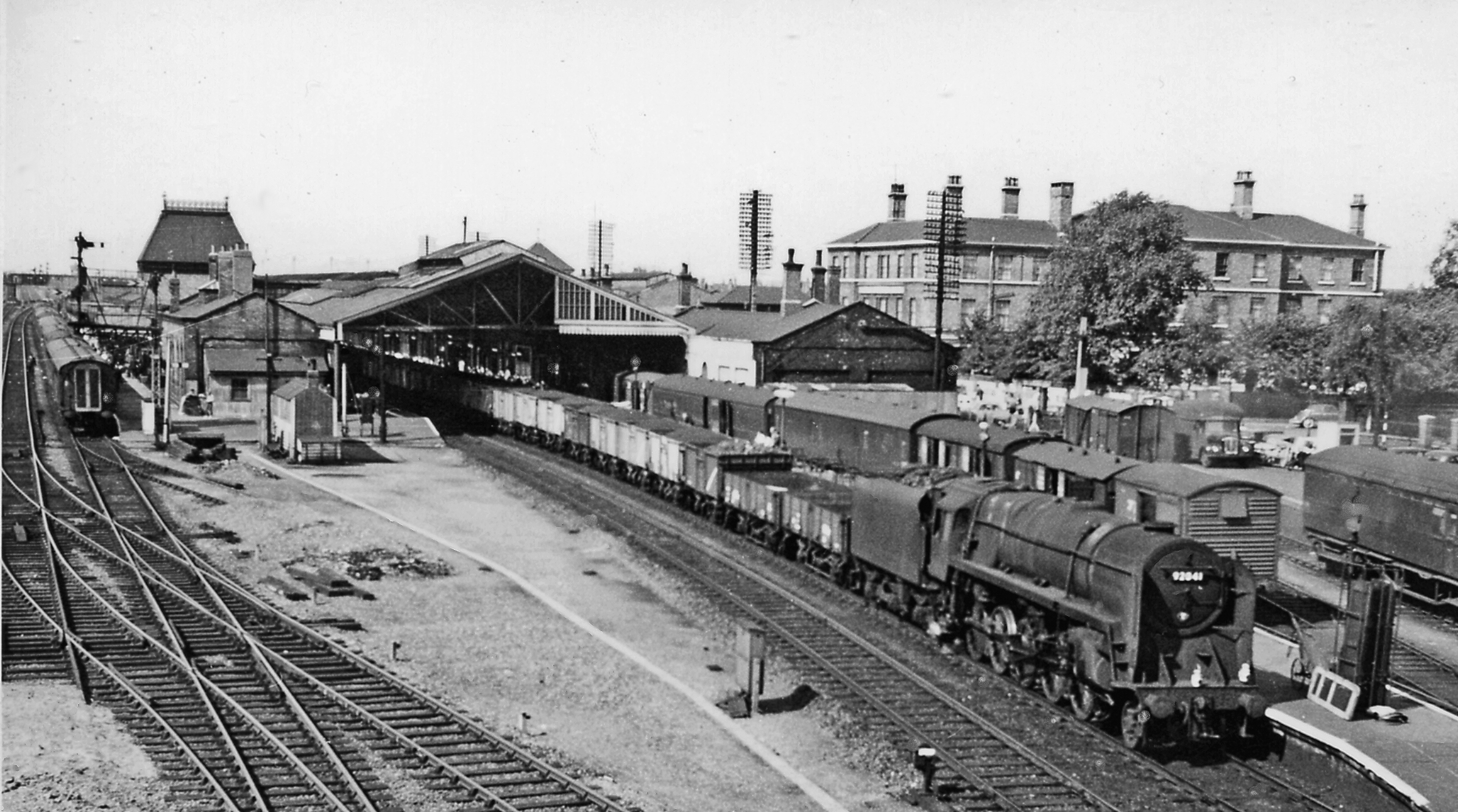
Peterborough station in 1962. The nineteenth-century station design with just three through platforms was a severe bottleneck, leading to rebuilding in the 1970s.

GNR service to Leicester ended in 1916 during World War I. In March 1959 the line to Wisbech and to Sutton Bridge closed along with most of the rest of the M&GNR and local services on the GNR main line ended with a number of minor stations including Yaxley and Farcet and Tallington being closed.

The Northampton and Peterborough Railway closed in May 1964, followed 2 years later by the closure of Peterborough East station and the passenger services to Rugby in June 1966 (part of this line was eventually reopened as the Nene Valley Railway heritage line). In the same year several minor stations on the Birmingham line were closed including Helpston and Ketton & Collyweston.

The final closure came in October 1970 when the lines to Spalding, Boston and Grimsby were closed, although the Peterborough to Lincoln Line to Spalding was reopened on 7 June 1971 with a shuttle service of 3 trains each way per day. This service was improved in 1982 with the closure of the March to Spalding section of the former Great Northern and Great Eastern Joint Railway when the Lincoln to Cambridge service became the Lincoln to Peterborough service.

=== Renewal ===
In the 1970s major alterations occurred under British Rail to the former North station. In 1972 the track layout was remodelled, to provide high speed through lines and two new platforms. GNR bay platforms 4 and 5 (redundant since the withdrawal of East Lincolnshire line services) and through platform 6 were removed, together with all of the buildings between platforms 3 and 6, the new through lines scything through the site of the latter. New platforms 4 and 5, an island to the west of the fast lines, on the site of the former Midland Railway lines, were opened.

In 1976, the life-expired GNR booking hall and east side buildings were demolished, due to their condition, and were replaced by Portakabins. A contract was awarded to local company, Bernard Stokeley Ltd., to provide replacement buildings (which, with alterations, are those in use today) and these were opened a couple of years later.

Further new facilities were provided, post privatisation, as part of Great North Eastern Railway's £10 million station improvement programme to modernise facilities at key stations along the ECML. The modern travel centre is part of a £1 million upgrade which includes new passenger lounges on platforms 2 and 3 (since renumbered 1 and 2, following the closure of the original bay platform at the south end of the former platform 2), new toilet facilities on platforms 2 (now 1), 4 and 5, new customer information screens and improved security including the installation of CCTV cameras within the station and car park.

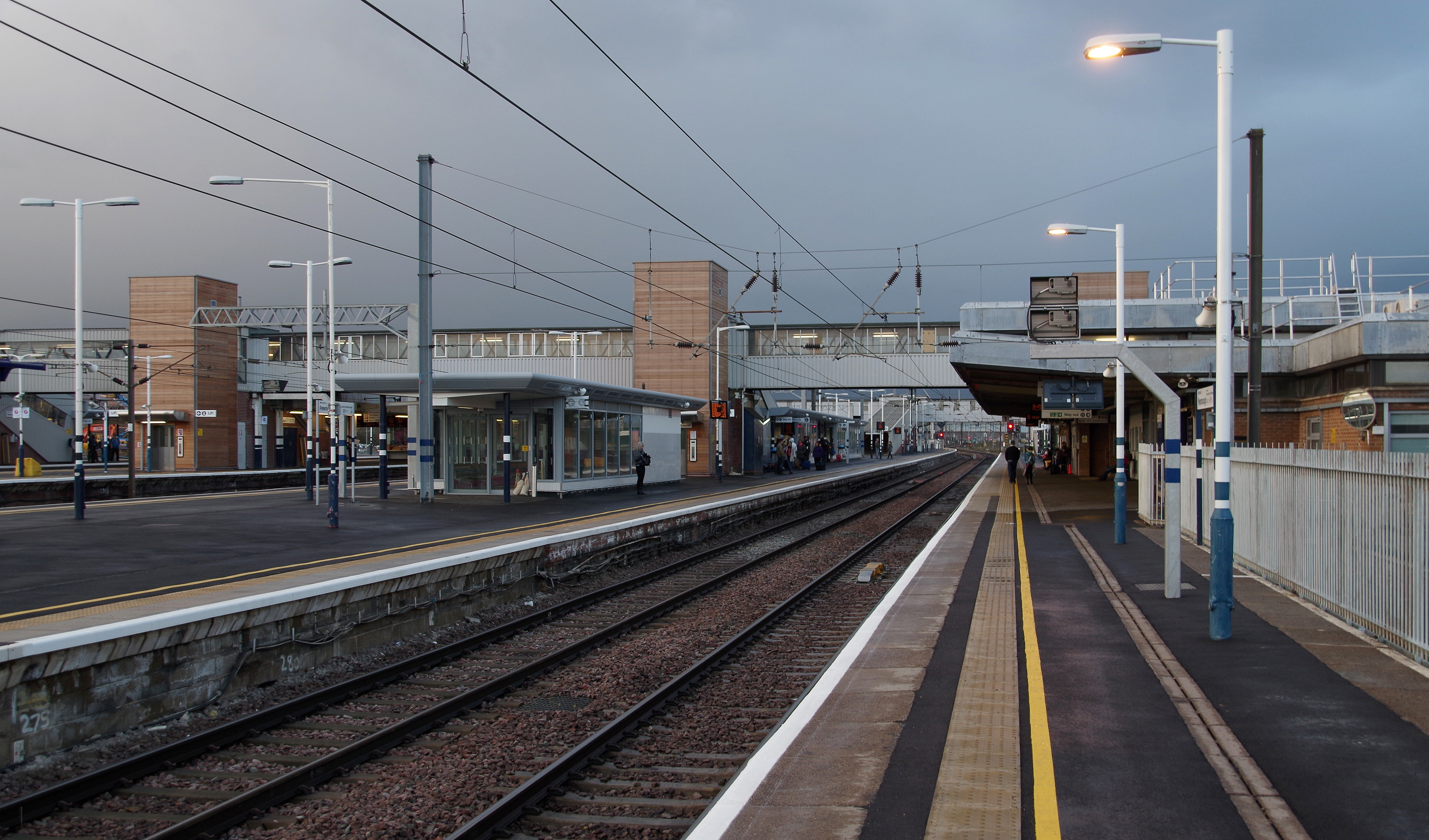
Peterborough railway station in 2014, following the addition of platforms 6 & 7 the previous year.

A further major remodeling occurred in 2013, when three new platforms were opened and the original platform 1 bay was removed. Original platforms 2 and 3 were renumbered 1 and 2. A new platform face on the southbound through line was opened and numbered 3, together with a new island platform to the west of the station, on the site of the former fly-ash sidings and reversible freight line, these being numbered 6 and 7. Both the passenger footbridge and the former parcels bridge at the north end of the station were extended to the new island, lifts being added to the passenger footbridge.

=== Changes in 2014 ===
Network Rail spent a reported £2.5 million on Peterborough station and its surroundings, in a move that is intended to increase passenger capacity on trains and ease freight movements through the station. This upgrade has seen changes to the booking office and station concourse building along with the introduction of ticket gates. In addition some refurbishment work and changes have been made to the waiting rooms and other facilities on platform 4/5.

== Facilities ==
The station has a concourse and ticket office area which was internally redesigned and reopened in mid-2012. The concourse features both a newsagents and a cafe. For general assistance there is a customer information point located on platform 1 by the concourse, as well as customer service offices on platform 5 and near the toilets on platform 2. All platforms are accessible by means of a passenger footbridge with lifts and also by a ramp bridge at the north end of the station.

There is on site car parking. Within a few minutes walk is Peterborough city centre, and the Queensgate shopping centre. As of March 2013, there is an automated cycle hire scheme outside the south end of the station building.

== Services ==
There are regular services to and from London King's Cross, operated by London North Eastern Railway and by Great Northern, although Great Northern now only operates services in the weekday peaks. Southbound LNER services run either non-stop to the capital or call only at Stevenage: northbound destinations include Edinburgh Waverley, Leeds, Lincoln Central, and Newcastle (though many Scottish services now run non-stop from London to York).

Great Northern trains start and terminate at Peterborough (weekday peak times only) and serve most intermediate stations southwards. This was a regular service in the past, but most of these off-peak weekday and Saturday services were incorporated into the Thameslink network, largely between Peterborough and Horsham via London St Pancras International and East Croydon These run every 30 minutes. Some early morning and late evening weekday/Saturday trains terminate or start at Kings Cross.

CrossCountry regional services run hourly between Birmingham via Leicester to Cambridge and Stansted Airport.

East Midlands Railway also operate hourly, between Norwich and Liverpool via Nottingham, Sheffield and Manchester Piccadilly. EMR also operate local services to Spalding, Sleaford and Lincoln on an approximately hourly frequency. Some of these trains are extended to/from Doncaster.

Greater Anglia operate a two-hourly service to Ipswich via Ely and Bury St Edmunds. A small number of services are extended to Colchester via Manningtree, with three direct services per day operating on weekdays.

Sunday services run less frequently on the ECML, but run on similar frequencies on the regional routes. There are no through Thameslink trains to Horsham (these run to/from Kings Cross only) or local services to Spalding, Sleaford and Lincoln.

== Station layout ==
Video of LNER Azuma 801 229 passing Peterborough on the Down Fast line between platforms 3 and 4 (seen from the latter), at speed, in September 2026

- Platform 1: Through platform, predominantly used by terminating Thameslink services from Horsham via St. Pancras International, as well as Great Northern (peak times only) and London North Eastern Railway services to King's Cross. The East Midlands Railway shuttle services to/from Spalding occasionally use this platform. Renumbered from 2 in December 2013. A south-facing bay platform, former Platform 1, was decommissioned & lifted in December 2013.
- Platform 2: An island through platform (formerly numbered 3), predominantly used by terminating Thameslink services from Horsham via St. Pancras International, as well as Great Northern (peak times only) and London North Eastern Railway services to King's Cross. It is also used by the hourly East Midlands Railway service to Spalding & Lincoln, typically operated by Class 170 DMUs.
- Platform 3: New through island platform alongside the up fast line, commissioned in December 2013. Used almost entirely by London North Eastern Railway fast services to London, though some Great Northern suburban trains also use it; non-stop southbound trains also pass through this platform.
- Down Fast: Through track between Platforms 3 and 4 for non-stop passenger services. These are used by northbound non-stop London North Eastern Railway, Hull Trains, Grand Central and Lumo services.
- Platform 4: Through island platform, used predominantly by northbound London North Eastern Railway services to Leeds, Newcastle and Edinburgh Waverley. It is also used, albeit infrequently, by some East Midlands train services.
- Platform 5: Through island platform, adjacent to platform 4, used predominantly for freight; East Midlands Railway between Norwich and Liverpool and northbound London North Eastern Railway services can be diverted to platform 5 if required.
  - Platforms 4 & 5 are used in the evening peak by terminating Great Northern services from King's Cross, so the stock can be taken to Nene Carriage Sidings, located to the south of the station.
- Platforms 6 & 7: These new platforms were commissioned over the Christmas break 2013, and are now used by CrossCountry services between Stansted Airport/Cambridge via Ely and Birmingham New Street via Leicester; East Midlands Railway services between Norwich and Liverpool; and Greater Anglia services to Ipswich. No overhead line electrification.
  - Greater Anglia uses platform 6 only for services to Ipswich due to the current track layout.
- Two-Way Goods Line: bi-directional freight loop located beyond platform 7. This is frequently used by the many freight services that pass through Peterborough along with Platforms 4–7. Much freight is to/from Felixstowe although other destinations are served.

== Route ==
Below are the routes that Peterborough is currently on, as well as those that it has been on in the past:

Preceding station	National Rail	Following station
London King's Cross	London North Eastern Railway; London-Edinburgh/Scotland	York or Newark Northgate
London King's Cross or Stevenage	London North Eastern Railway; London-Leeds/West Yorkshire	Grantham or Doncaster
London King's Cross or Stevenage	London North Eastern Railway; London-Edinburgh/York/Newcastle	Grantham, York or Newark Northgate
London King's Cross or Stevenage	London North Eastern Railway; London-Newark/Doncaster/Hull/Peterborough	Grantham or Terminus
London King's Cross or Stevenage	London North Eastern Railway; London-Lincoln (Limited Service)	Grantham or Newark Northgate
London; King's Cross	Grand Central; West Riding	Doncaster
London; King's Cross	Grand Central; North East	York
Huntingdon	Thameslink Thameslink (Peterborough to Horsham Line)	Terminus
Huntingdon	Great Northern Great Northern (Peterborough to King's Cross Line) Peak times and weekday evenings only	Terminus
Stamford	CrossCountry Birmingham-Peterborough line	March
Stamford	CrossCountry Birmingham-Peterborough line	Whittlesea Limited Service
Grantham	East Midlands Railway Liverpool-Norwich	Ely
Grantham	East Midlands Railway Liverpool-Norwich	March Limited Service
Grantham	East Midlands Railway Liverpool-Norwich	Whittlesea Limited Service
Stamford	East Midlands Railway Nottingham-Norwich (via Loughborough) Limited Service	March
Terminus	East Midlands Railway Peterborough-Lincoln Line Mondays-Saturdays only	Spalding
Terminus	Greater Anglia Ely to Peterborough Line	Whittlesea
Historical railways
Tallington Line open, station closed	Great Northern Railway East Coast Main Line	Yaxley and Farcet Line open, station closed
Peakirk Line open, station closed	Great Northern Railway Lincolnshire Loop Line	Terminus
Walton Line open, station closed	Midland Railway Syston and Peterborough Railway	Peterborough East Line open, station closed
Peterborough East Line open, station closed	Great Eastern Railway Ely to Peterborough Line	Terminus
Disused railways
Orton Waterville Line and station closed	London and North Western Railway To Leicester Belgrave Road	Terminus
Terminus	Midland and Great Northern Joint Railway Sutton Bridge line	Eye Green Line and station closed

== See also ==
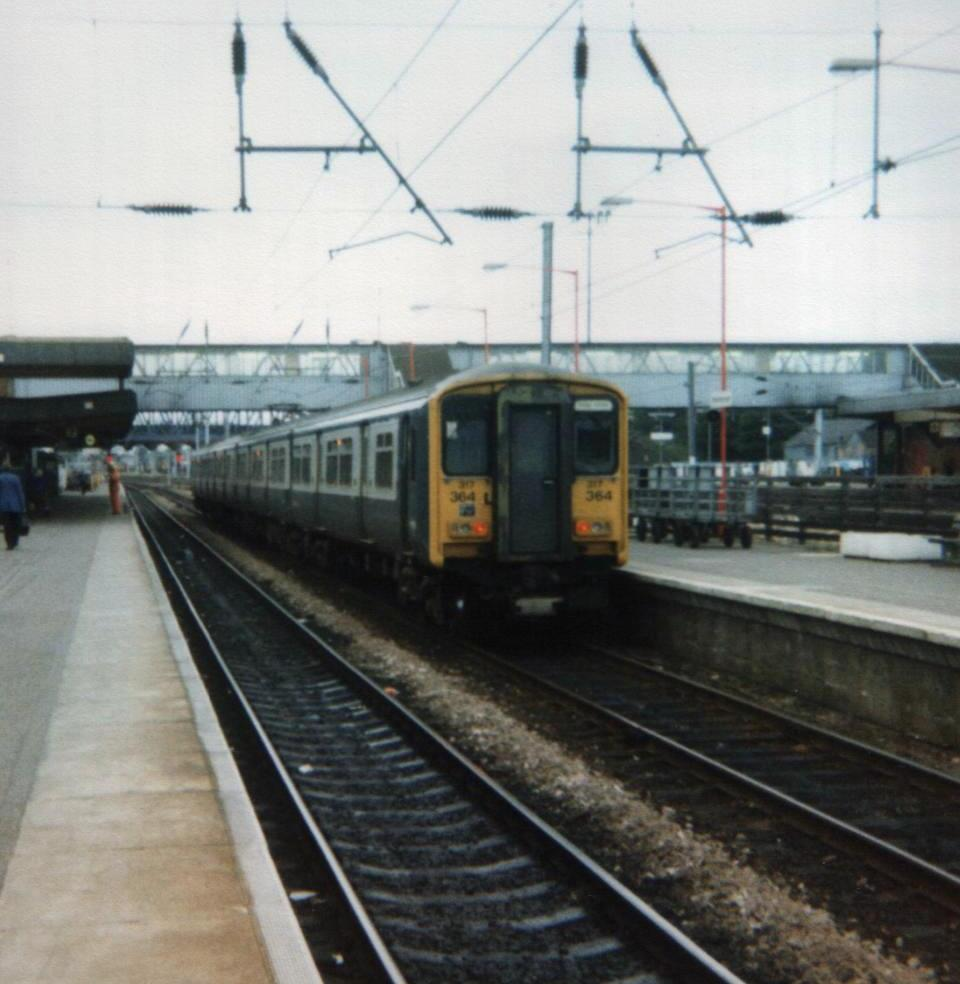
British Rail Class 317 in Peterborough.

- Peterborough East railway station
- Peterborough Nene Valley railway station and Nene Valley Railway (preserved railway)
- Peterborough to Lincoln Line
- Birmingham to Peterborough Line
- Ely to Peterborough Line
