= Lincolnshire loop line =

Railway line in England

Coordinates: 53.1424°N 0.2419°W

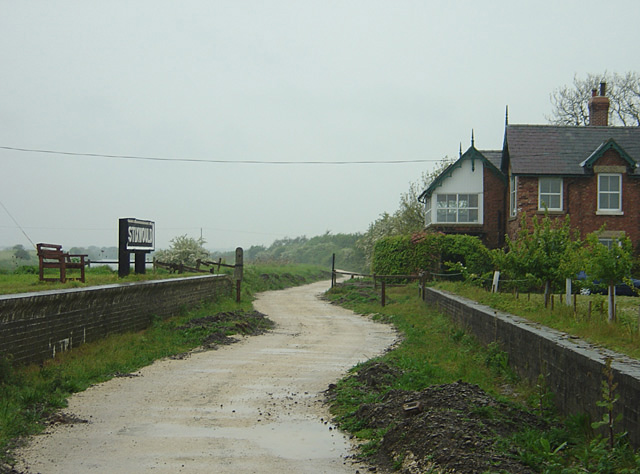
- Former station at Stixwould. The trackbed here is part of the Water Rail Way.

Overview
- Locale: Lincolnshire
- Dates of operation: 1848–1963
- Predecessor: Great Northern Railway
- Successor: London and North Eastern Railway

Technical
- Track gauge: 4 ft 8 1/2 in (1,435 mm)
- Length: 58 miles (93 km)

The Lincolnshire loop line was a railway built by the Great Northern Railway, that linked Peterborough to Gainsborough via Spalding, Boston and Lincoln. It ran through the counties of Lincolnshire and Northamptonshire (then the Soke of Peterborough, now Cambridgeshire)

== History ==
The Lincolnshire loop line was authorised on 26 June 1846 as part of the Great Northern Railway Act 1846 (9 & 10 Vict. c. lxxi). The Great Northern Railway purchased the Witham Navigation and all navigation rights the same year and began construction of the new line, partly beside the river, in 1847. The line opened in 1848 and was for a short period the main route to the north and Scotland until the line from Peterborough to Retford was opened in August 1852. Closure came in sections: the first was Woodhall Junction to Boston which closed to passengers and goods on 17 June 1963. Followed by the section from Boston to Spalding and finally from Lincoln to Woodhall Junction as well as to Firsby and Horncastle.

== Route ==
The line from Lincoln to Boston was known as the Witham loop because it followed the course of the River Witham, passing through Washingborough, Five Mile House, Bardney, Southrey, Stixwould, Tattershall, Dogdyke, and Langrick. The line from Boston to Spalding passed through three intermediate stations, Kirton, Algarkirk and Sutterton, and Surfleet; much of this section is now under the A16 road. The final section to Peterborough also had three intermediate stations, Littleworth, St James Deeping, and Peakirk. This section is the only part of the line that remains in operation, although most of the stations have long been closed and disused.

Six stations, Gainsborough Lea Road, Saxilby, Lincoln, Boston, Spalding and Peterborough North remain open, and are still part of the national network.

=== List of railway stations ===
- Gainsborough – line and station open.
  - Lea (opened 1 August 1849) – line open; station closed.
  - Stow Park – line open; station closed.
- Saxilby – line and station open.
  - Skellingthorpe (opened 1 January 1865) - line open; station closed.
- Lincoln Central – line and station open.
  - Washingborough – closed and disused.
  - Five Mile House – closed and disused.
  - Bardney – closed and disused.
  - Southrey – closed and disused.
  - Stixwould – closed and disused.
  - Woodhall Junction – closed and disused.
  - Tattershall – closed and disused.
  - Dogdyke (opened September 1849) – closed and disused.
  - Langrick – closed and disused.
- Boston (opened 2 October 1848) – line and station open.
  - Kirton (opened 3 April 1849) – line and station site lost under bypass.
  - Algarkirk and Sutterton – line lost under bypass, former station building still stands near A16/A17 Sutterton roundabout.
  - Surfleet (opened 3 April 1849) – line and station site lost under bypass.
- Spalding – line and station open.
  - Littleworth – line open; station site closed.
  - St. James Deeping (opened 1 August 1849) – line open; station site closed.
  - Peakirk – line open; station site closed.
- Peterborough (opened 7 August 1850) – line and station open.

The stations between Lincoln (inclusive) and Peterborough mostly opened on 17 October 1848, and those between Gainsborough (inclusive) and Lincoln mostly opened on 9 April 1849, except where otherwise shown. Boston was opened before the other stations, since it was already in use as the southern terminus of the East Lincolnshire Railway, opened in stages between 1 March and 2 October 1848. At Peterborough, the GNR initially used the Eastern Counties Railway's station, latterly known as Peterborough East, which was reached via a connection near Walton to the Midland Railway, whose line between Stamford and Peterborough was opened on 2 October 1846. The GNR's own Peterborough station opened with the main line between Werrington Junction and London in August 1850.

== Present day ==
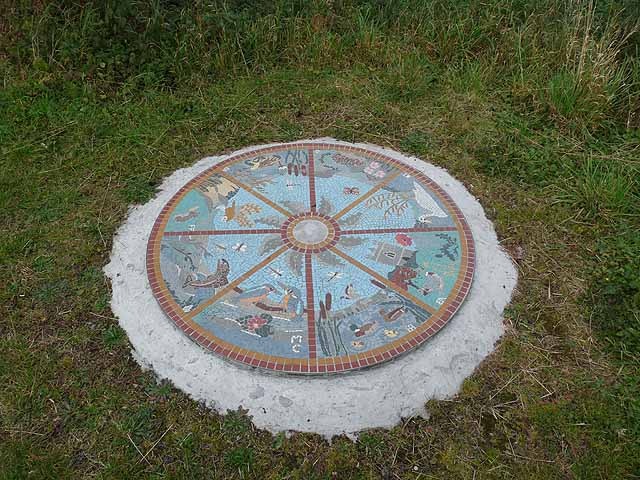
There is a variety of art along the cycle route. Much is whimsical sculpture, but this mosaic commemorates a Bronze Age Craft site archaeologists discovered on the South Delph

The line from Lincoln to Woodhall Junction now forms part of National Cycle Route 1, and is known as Water Rail Way. From Woodhall Junction to Boston, the entire line is private and has no permissive paths or access. From Boston to Spalding, the line is occupied by the A16. At Spalding, the line is still open to Peterborough.
