= Boston railway station =

Railway station in Lincolnshire, England

Boston
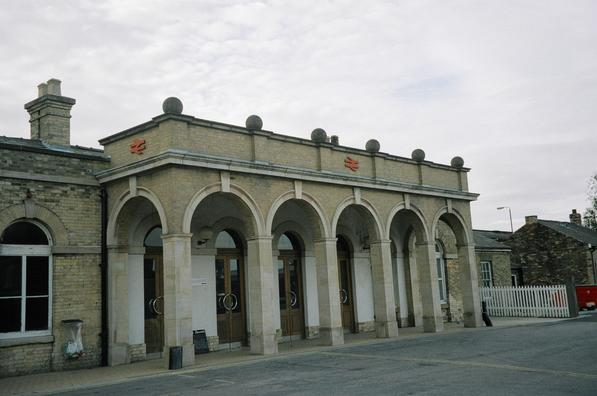

General information
- Location: Boston, Borough of Boston, England
- Coordinates: 52.978°N 0.031°W
- Grid reference: TF323441
- Managed by: East Midlands Railway
- Platforms: 2

Other information
- Station code: BSN
- Classification: DfT category E

History
- Opened: 17 October 1848

Passengers
- 2020/21: ▼59,220
- 2021/22: ▲0.171 million
- 2022/23: ▲0.200 million
- 2023/24: ▲0.225 million
- 2024/25: ▲0.267 million
Location
Notes
- Passenger statistics from the Office of Rail and Road

Boston railway station serves the town of Boston, in Lincolnshire, England. It is a stop on the Poacher Line, which connects Grantham with Skegness. The station is owned by Network Rail and managed by East Midlands Railway, which provides all services.

== History ==
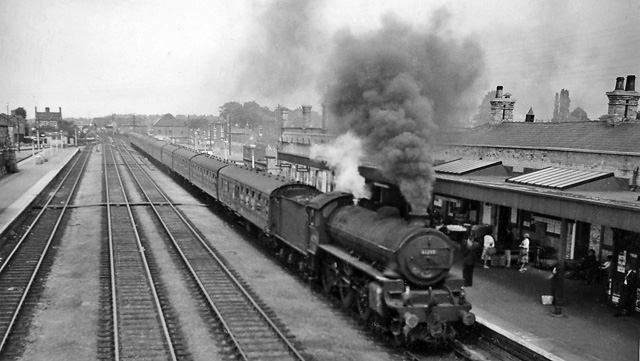
View northward, towards Firsby and Grimsby in 1964

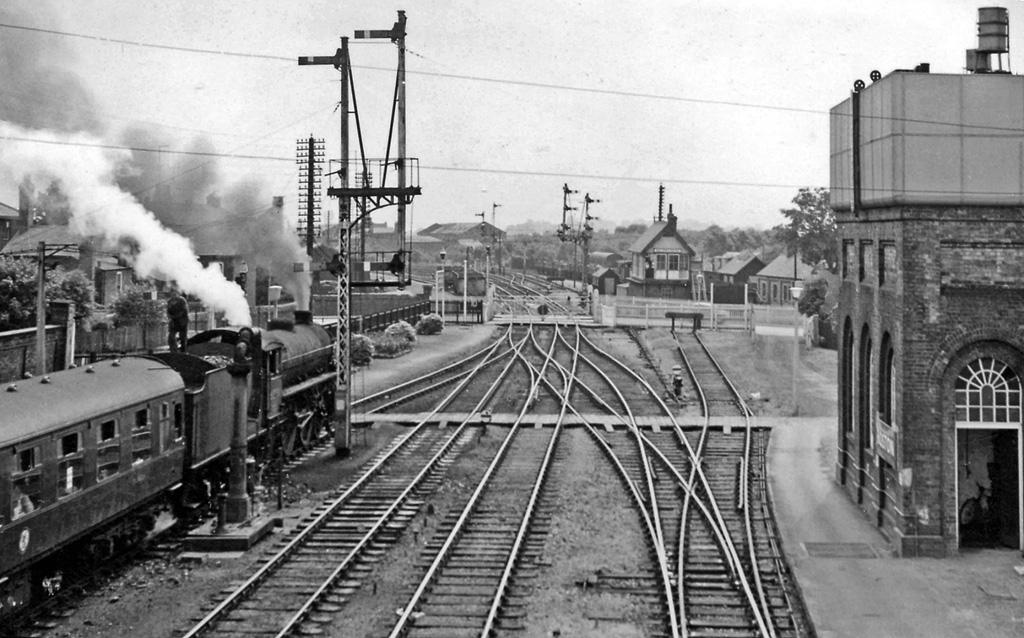
View southward, towards Sleaford in 1964

The station opened on 17 October 1848, with the opening of the Great Northern Railway's East Lincolnshire Line.

The station has declined in importance since the 1960s. In its heyday, the station employed over 50 staff with two through tracks and cover over the platform tracks. The Skegness-bound platform had classic Great Northern Railway (GNR) architecture buildings, which have since been replaced with plastic shelters. The station frontage remains, albeit altered in a partially reconstructed manner, and some of the buildings have found new uses.

Boston station was once an important junction, with two lines diverging in either direction. Today, only the eastbound line to Skegness and the westbound line towards Sleaford remain in use. There was previously a southbound line to Spalding, which closed in October 1970; it joined the line to Peterborough and formed part of the original GNR main line from London King's Cross to York. In addition, there was a north-westbound line to Woodhall Junction (closed in June 1963) and thence on towards Lincoln Central, Horncastle or Louth. Both surviving routes are single tracked, with a passing loop at the station.

To the south of the station, the access to Boston Docks, via the swing bridge, and the site of the Broadfield Lane depot remain; the rail link into the docks still sees occasional use. To the north along the old Lincoln to Boston and Horncastle route, about 2 miles (3.2 km) north of the town is the old Hall Hills sleeper depot.

== Services ==
All services at Boston are operated by East Midlands Railway. The station is served by:

- 1 train per hour westbound to Nottingham, via Grantham
- 1 train per hour eastbound to Skegness.

Preceding station	National Rail	Following station
Heckington	East Midlands Railway Poacher Line	Wainfleet
Hubberts Bridge Limited Service	East Midlands Railway Poacher Line	Thorpe Culvert Limited Service
	Historical railways	
Sibsey	Great Northern Railway East Lincolnshire Line	Terminus
	Disused railways	
Langrick	Great Northern Railway Lincolnshire Loop Line	Kirton
