= Spalding railway station =

Railway station in Lincolnshire, England

Spalding
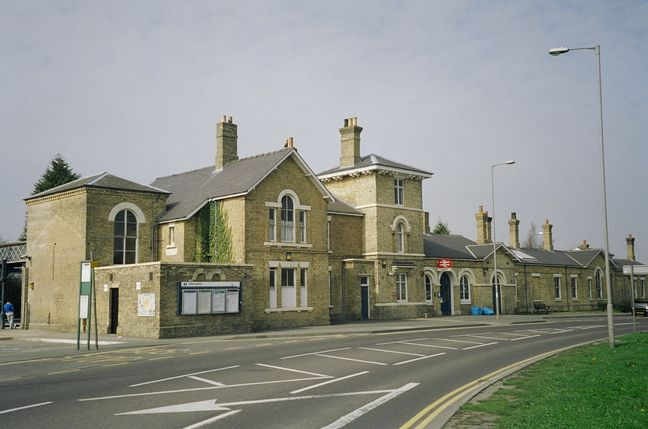
- The station viewed from the road

General information
- Location: Spalding, South Holland; England
- Coordinates: 52.7889°N 0.1569°W
- Grid reference: TF243228
- Manager: East Midlands Railway
- Platforms: 2

Other information
- Station code: SPA
- Classification: DfT category E

History
- Original company: Great Northern Railway
- Pre-grouping: Great Northern Railway
- Post-grouping: London and North Eastern Railway

Key dates
- 17 October 1848: Opened as Spalding
- 1 December 1948: Renamed Spalding Town
- 5 October 1970: Peterborough line closed
- 7 June 1971: Peterborough line reopened

Passengers
- 2020/21: ▼44,986
- 2021/22: ▲134,834
- 2022/23: ▲166,860
- 2023/24: ▲186,122
- 2024/25: ▲207,774

Listed Building – Grade II
- Feature: Spalding Town Station
- Designated: 16 March 1990
- Reference no.: 1063914
Location
Notes
- Passenger statistics from the Office of Rail and Road

Spalding railway station serves the town of Spalding, Lincolnshire, England. It lies on the Peterborough–Lincoln line.

== History ==
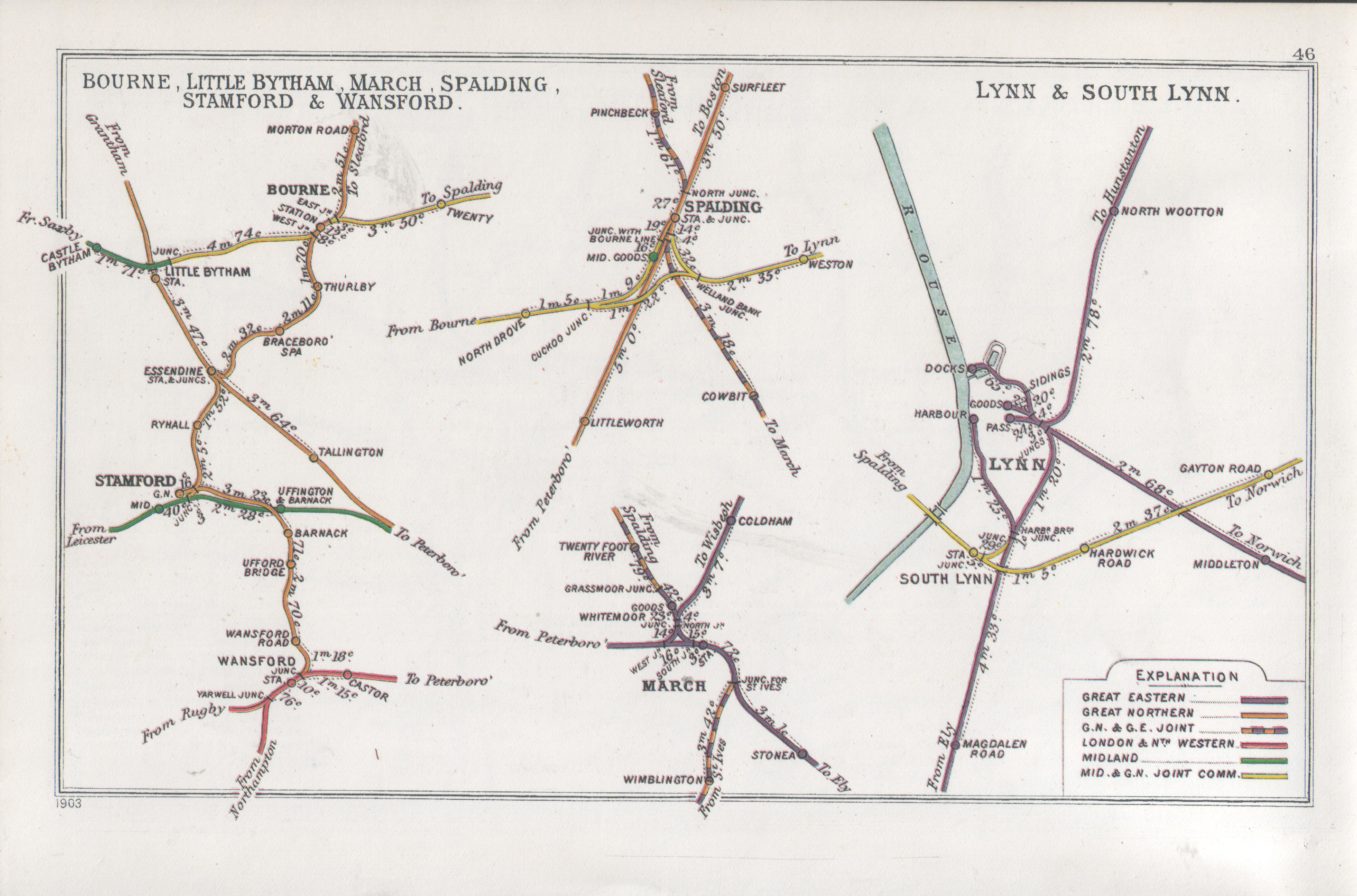
A 1903 Railway Clearing House map of railways in the vicinity of Spalding (upper centre)

Spalding gained its first rail links to Peterborough, Boston and Lincoln in 1848, courtesy of the Great Northern Railway (GNR) who built their main line from London to Doncaster through the town; Spalding railway station opened on 17 October 1848. This route was superseded by the direct line via Grantham within four years, but it remained well used by traffic heading towards Louth and Grimsby over the former East Lincolnshire Railway.

The GNR subsequently added a line eastwards to Sutton Bridge via Holbeach (the Norwich & Spalding Railway) in stages between 1858 and 1862, a westward route to Bourne in 1866 and another to March the following year in an attempt to thwart the ambitions of the competing Great Eastern Railway (GER). These efforts did not succeed however and the company eventually agreed to work these routes jointly with the Midland Railway (the former pair forming the backbone of the Midland and Great Northern Joint Railway system) and the GER (March line) by the beginning of the 1870s. The collaboration between GNR and GER also led to the construction of the last route out of the town, the GE&GN Joint line to Sleaford which opened to traffic on 1 August 1882.

By the end of the nineteenth century the town had become a major rail crossroads and the station had grown to reflect this, having more than doubled in size from its opening half a century earlier. It would also later become a popular destination in its own right, with the annual Tulip Festival bringing excursion trains into the town from all over the country from the late 1950s onwards.

British Railways was formed on 1 January 1948, and Spalding station was renamed Spalding Town on 1 December 1948. The Midland & Great Northern routes into the town were heavily used, particularly in the summer months, well into the 1950s, but they were the first to suffer from the BR economy drive of the time, closing to passengers on 28 February 1959. The East Lincolnshire line to Boston was to suffer a similar fate a decade later, with the last trains to Grimsby and Peterborough running on 3 October 1970. This left the Joint Line as the only surviving route through the town; typically just three trains per day each way between Lincoln and March/Cambridge called at the station in this period. However, its status as a junction was restored within months, the line to Peterborough regaining a limited (thrice daily, peak hours only) passenger service from 7 June 1971.

The Joint line remained a busy freight artery for the next few years, serving as one as the main outlets for the marshalling yard complex at Whitemoor but the general decline in freight traffic in the area would ultimately lead to the Spalding to March portion's closure to all traffic on 27 November 1982. This left the town effectively with the same rail access as it had back in 1848, albeit with trains to Lincoln running via Sleaford rather than Boston. Services to and from Peterborough did improve following the closure of the March line, with the existing service from Lincoln diverted to start and terminate there and some extra trains being added to the timetable.

The station, known in steam days as Spalding Town, was honoured on 3 May 2002 when a main line locomotive was dedicated to it. Class 31 diesel No. 31106, owned by Cambridgeshire businessman and enthusiast Howard Johnston, who was born nearby, arrived on a Tulip Parade day special train, and a short stopover was arranged for Colin Fisher, Chairman of South Holland District Council, to unveil the cast Spalding Town nameplate (which includes the authority's crest within it) on the side of the engine. He was also presented with a replica plate as a permanent reminder of the occasion. Although intended for public display, this has not yet taken place.

== Facilities ==
The station is owned by Network Rail and managed by East Midlands Railway who provide all rail services.

The station is staffed part-time and offers limited facilities other than two shelters, bicycle storage, timetables, platform departure screens and Help Points. There is also a ticket machine on platform 1. Other than a snack machine in the booking hall, there are no other retail facilities on the station; however local shops are within walking distance.

As of September 2020, new lifts are in operation allowing step free access to platform 2. A new waiting shelter was opened in March 2022.

Spalding has two platforms. Platform 1, adjacent to the station building, is mainly used for southbound services towards Peterborough and terminating trains from Peterborough, but is also used by some northbound through services towards Sleaford and Lincoln; Platform 2 can only be used by northbound services. The station used to have seven platforms: five through faces (up main and two islands) and two terminal bays, with services to March and Sleaford on the Great Northern and Great Eastern Joint Railway, Bourne and Kings Lynn on the Midland & Great Northern Joint Railway and the Great Northern "Lincolnshire Loop" line to Boston and then onwards to Louth and Grimsby. There was also, past the Northern Junction a freight line going off to the former British Sugar plant. Only the routes to Werrington Junction, Peterborough and Sleaford are still in use and the station has been remodelled and downsized considerably since the demise of the March line in 1982.

The bridge connecting Platforms 1 and 2 to the rest of the station still exists, but the old platform 5 has been fenced off, the bays filled in and the walk through on the bridge to platforms 6 and 7 bricked up. The tracks meanwhile have been lifted, the western island platforms cleared and the site now used for housing. Though very little remains of the old station, the façade remains as it was when first built.

Only 22 minutes from Peterborough, Spalding railway station is a few minutes away from the bus station connecting Spalding to Boston, King's Lynn and Peterborough.

== Services ==
All services at Spalding are operated by East Midlands Railway.

On weekdays and Saturdays, the station is generally served by an hourly service northbound to Lincoln via Sleaford and southbound to Peterborough. Five trains per day are extended beyond Lincoln to Doncaster. The station is also served by a single daily service to and from Newark North Gate.

There is no Sunday service at the station.

Preceding station	National Rail	Following station
Sleaford	East Midlands Railway: Peterborough to Lincoln Line; Monday-Saturday only	Peterborough
	Historical railways	
Surfleet Line and station closed	Great Northern Railway Lincolnshire Loop Line	Littleworth Line open, station closed
Pinchbeck Line open, station closed	Great Northern and Great Eastern Joint Railway	Cowbit Line and station closed
	Disused railways	
North Drove Line and station closed	Midland and Great Northern Joint Railway	Weston Line and station closed
