= Wragby railway station =

Disused railway station in Lincolnshire, England

Wragby
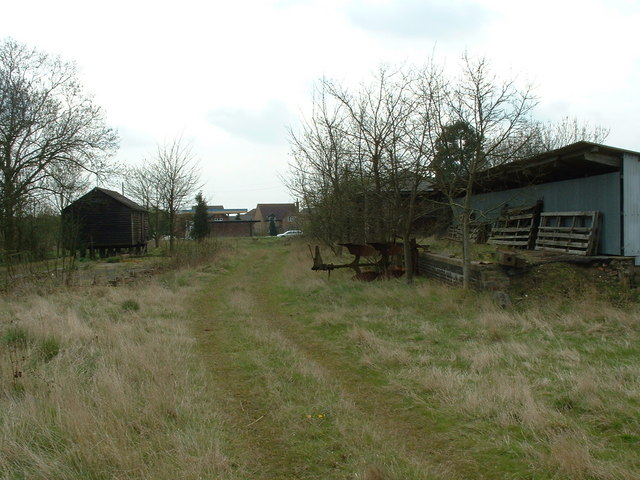
- Former station yard

General information
- Location: Wragby, East Lindsey; England
- Coordinates: 53.2862°N 0.2933°W
- Grid reference: TF139779
- Platforms: 2

Other information
- Status: Disused

History
- Original company: Louth and Lincoln Railway
- Pre-grouping: Great Northern Railway
- Post-grouping: London and North Eastern Railway

Key dates
- 9 November 1874: Opened (goods)
- 1 December 1876: Station opened to passengers
- 5 November 1951: closed (passenger)
- 1 February 1960: Line closed to all traffic
Location

Wragby railway station was a railway station that served the town of Wragby, Lincolnshire, England between 1874 and 1960, on the Louth to Bardney line.

== History ==
The Louth and Lincoln Railway planned and built a branch line from Bardney to Louth in stages, the first stage between Bardney and South Willingham and Hainton opened to goods traffic on 9 November 1874. South Willingham acted as a terminus until South Willingham Tunnel was completed. The line then opened to Donington on Bain on 27 September 1875, still goods traffic only.

The line was completed through to Louth for goods traffic on 6 August 1876 and opened to passengers on 1 December 1876. It was absorbed by the Great Northern Railway in 1882.

The station was located 135 miles 06 chains from London Kings Cross via Spalding, Boston and Bardney. The branch was mostly single track but at Wragby there was loop to allow trains to pass one another; two platforms were provided, one on each leg of the loop. A small waiting room was provided on the second platform. A timber signal box was located at half way along the loop, to control the block, and the goods yard. The yard had three long sidings serving a cattle dock. At the road entrance to the goods yard was a weighbridge and office; a provender store (a shed on short legs to prevent access by rodents) was used for storing grain and other perishables. Wragby Signal Box was provided with two electric token machines. These machines, along with their partners at Donington and Bardney, prevented two trains from entering the single line sections in opposite directions. A token, known as a ticket on this branch, would need to be carried by the driver of every train. The signalman at Wragby would have leave his box to collect the token from each train as it arrived and issue another token for the next section.

The station building included living accommodation for the Station Master and his family as well as a booking office and waiting room. Architecturally, the building was in the same style as others on the line; built of brick with a number of brick string courses of a contrasting colour. The number and appearance of the string courses differed on each station; at Wragby, the general bricks were a lighter colour with darker string course bricks.

=== Passenger service ===
When the line opened five passenger trains a day were provided, but this was quickly reduced to 4, with 5 on Fridays. At the start of the Second World War the service was suspended for three months. When it was reinstated in December 1939 the timetable was reduced to three trains in each direction and the 1950 timetable shows that this arrangement continued after the war until closure. Although originally intended to run to Lincoln, trains on the line only ran between Louth and Bardney; passengers had to change at Bardney to get to Lincoln. Trains were timetabled to get to Bardney in 11 minutes, with a connection to Lincoln taking a further 25 minutes. In the other direction, trains took 13 minutes to get to Donington on Bain and 33 minutes to arrive in Louth (these are sample times and varied during the day and in the direction travelled).

Passenger services ended on 5 November 1951, goods traffic on 1 February 1960.

=== After closure ===
The track was lifted in 1961. The station building remains standing adjacent to the A158 road on the outskirts of the village, along with its platform, and has been converted into a private residence. The trackbed towards Louth is built on by houses and to Bardney is agriculture.

== Route ==
Preceding station	Disused railways	Following station
Kingthorpe; Line and station closed	Great Northern Railway; Louth to Bardney line	East Barkwith; Line and station closed
