= Hallington railway station =

Former railway station in Lincolnshire, England

Hallington
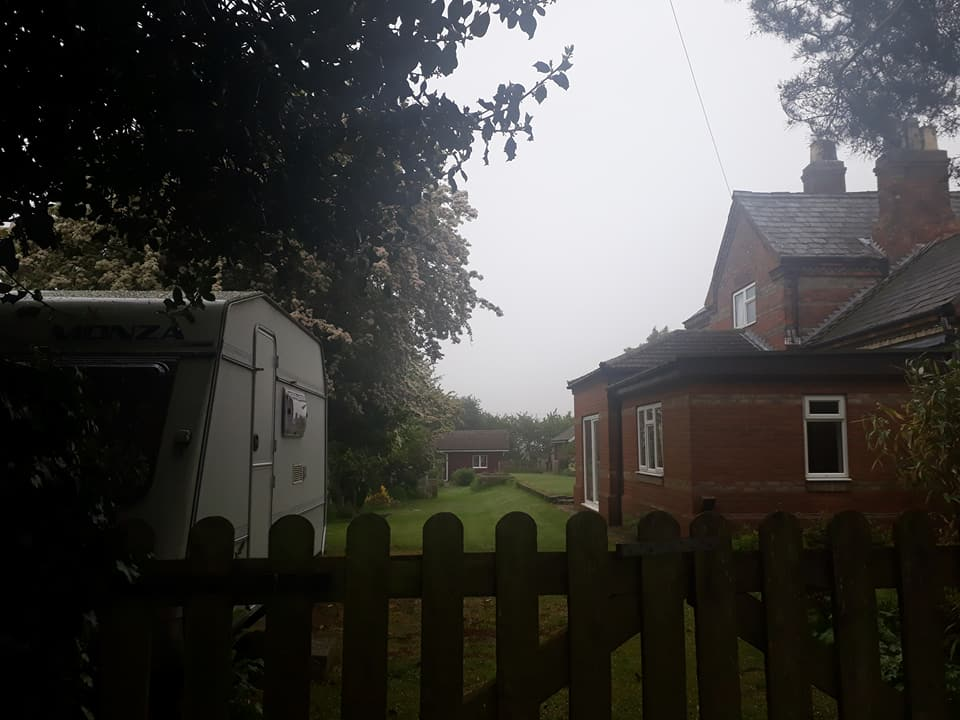
- Hallington railway station in 2018

General information
- Location: Hallington, East Lindsey; England
- Coordinates: 53.3474°N 0.0429°W
- Grid reference: TF304851
- Platforms: 1

Other information
- Status: Disused

History
- Original company: Louth and Lincoln Railway
- Pre-grouping: Great Northern Railway
- Post-grouping: London and North Eastern Railway

Key dates
- 28 June 1876: opened (goods)
- 1 December 1876: opened (passenger)
- 5 November 1951: closed (passenger)
- 17 December 1956: closed (goods)
Location

Hallington railway station was a station in Hallington, Lincolnshire.

== History ==
The Great Northern Railway planned and built a branch line from Bardney to Louth in stages, the final stage between Donington on Bain and Louth opening to goods on 28 June 1876 and passengers on 1 December 1876. Hallington railway station was the first station west of Louth on this line.

Passenger services ended on 5 November 1951, goods traffic on 17 December 1956.

The station buildings still stand and are now a private dwelling.

== Route ==
Preceding station	Disused railways	Following station
Withcall	Great Northern Railway; Louth to Bardney line	Louth
