= Withcall railway station =

Former railway station in England

Withcall
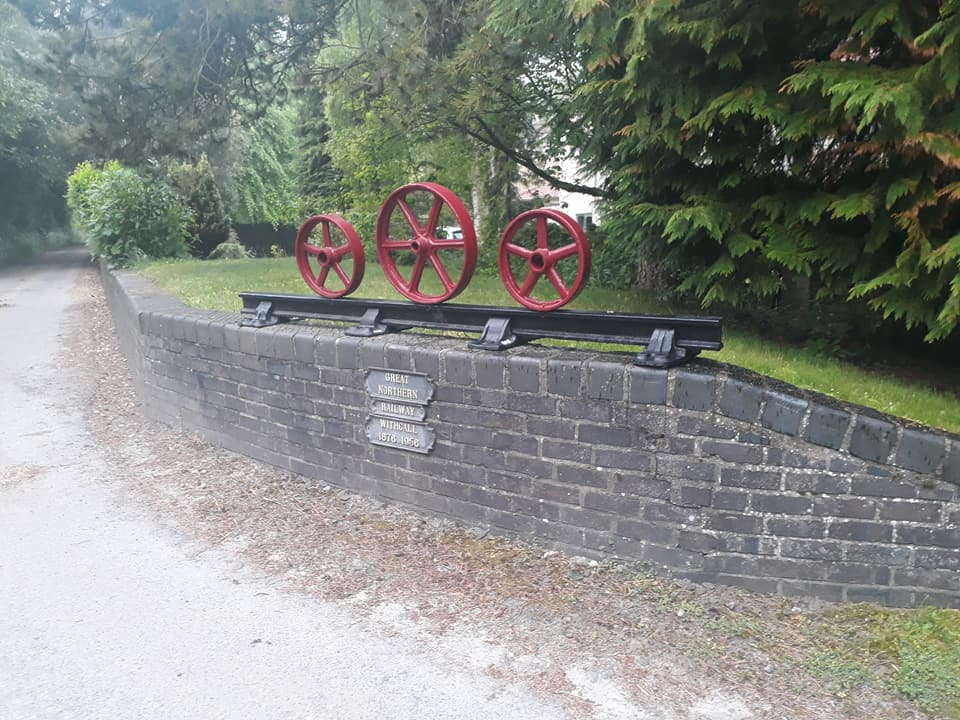
- Withcall station platform in 2018

General information
- Location: Withcall, East Lindsey; England
- Coordinates: 53.3341°N 0.0754°W
- Grid reference: TF284836
- Platforms: 1

Other information
- Status: Disused

History
- Original company: Louth and Lincoln Railway
- Pre-grouping: Great Northern Railway
- Post-grouping: London and North Eastern Railway

Key dates
- 28 June 1876: opened (goods)
- 1 Aug 1882: opened (passenger)
- 5 Nov 1951: closed (passenger)
- 17 Dec 1956: closed (goods)
Location

Withcall railway station was a station in Withcall, Lincolnshire, England.

== History ==
The Great Northern Railway planned and built a branch line from Bardney to Louth in stages, the final stage between Donington on Bain and Louth opening to goods on 28 June 1876 and passengers on 1 August 1882 Withcall railway station was the second station west of Louth on this line.

Passenger services ended on 5 November 1951, goods traffic on 17 December 1956.

== Route ==
Preceding station	Disused railways	Following station
Donington on Bain; Line and station closed	Great Northern Railway; Louth to Bardney line	Hallington; Line and station closed
