= Bardney =

Village and civil parish in the West Lindsey district of Lincolnshire, England

Coordinates: 53.210952°N 0.324362°W

- Village and civil parish
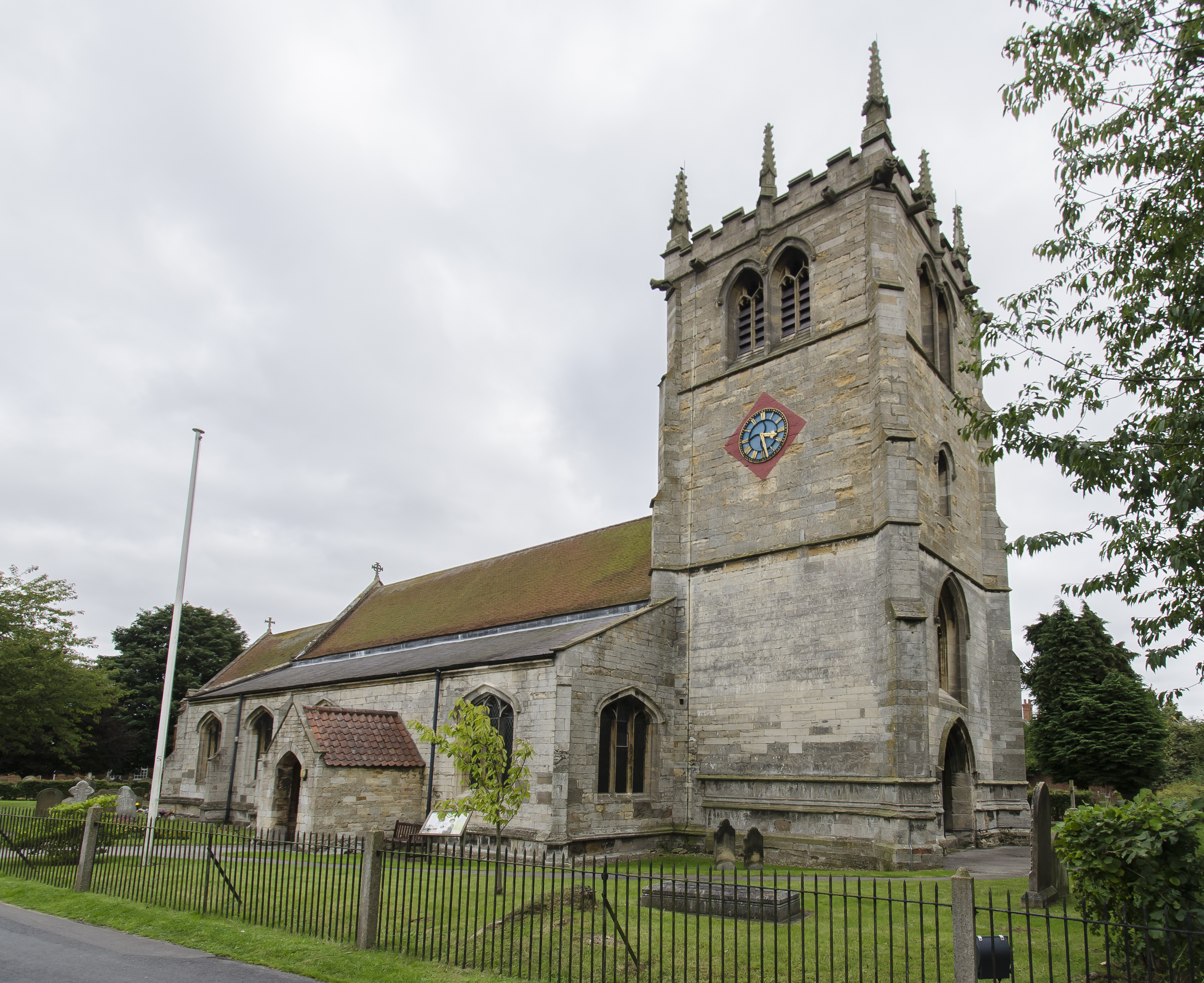
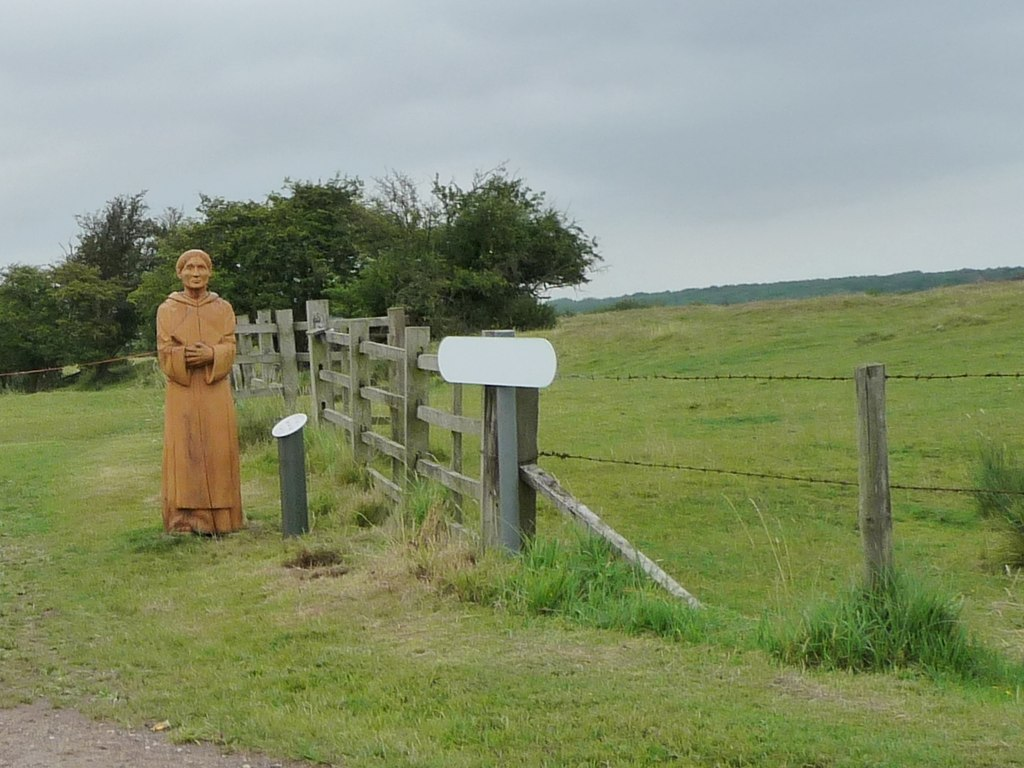
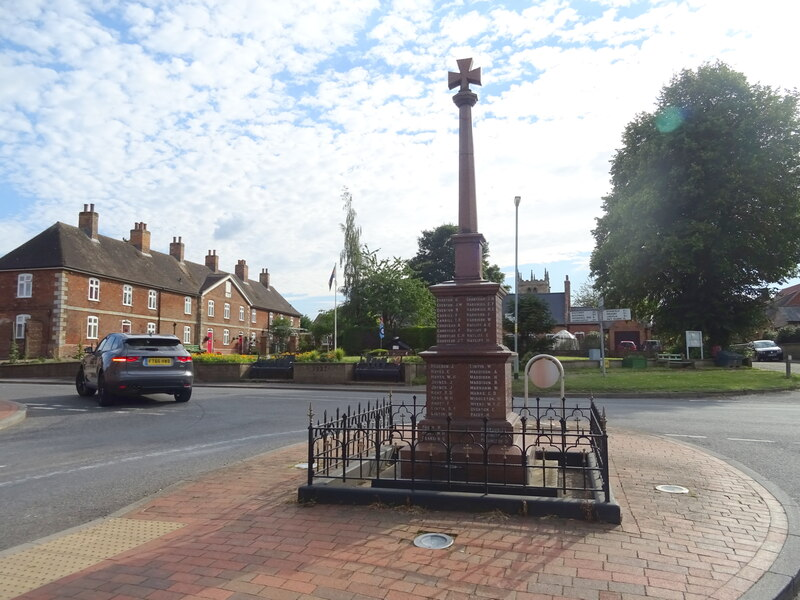
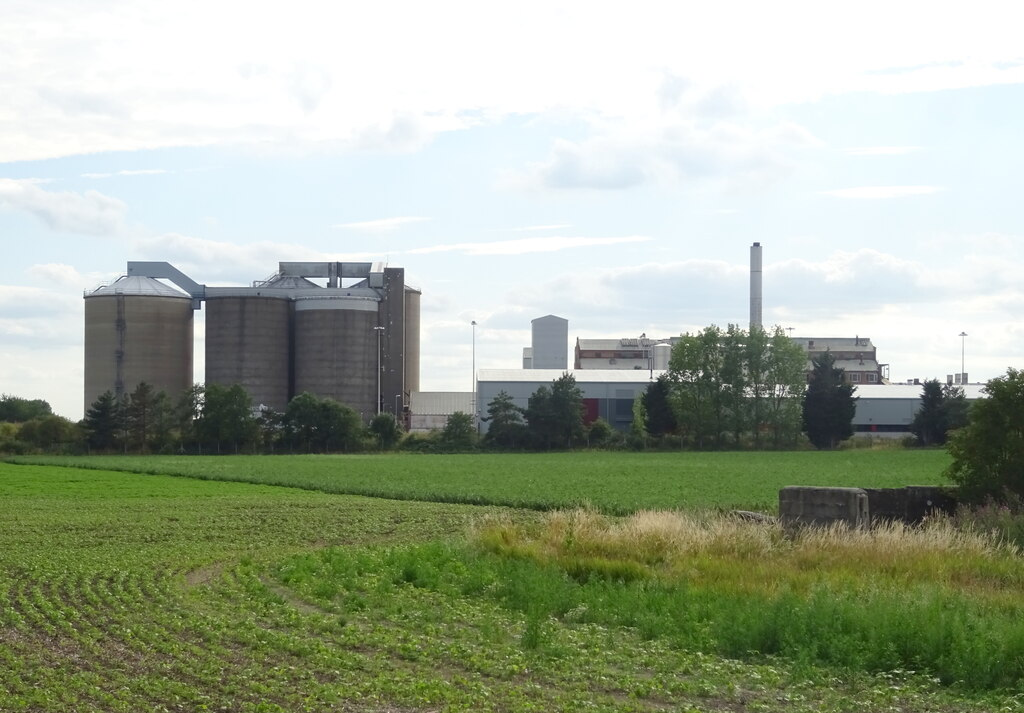
- Clockwise from top: Bardney St Lawrence's Church, War Memorial, Jordans and Ryvita Co Factory and Abbey Site

- Location within Lincolnshire
- Population: 2,069 2021 Census
- OS grid reference: TF120695
  - London: 115 mi (185 km) S
- Civil parish: Bardney
- District: West Lindsey
- Shire county: Lincolnshire
- Region: East Midlands
- Country: England
- Sovereign state: United Kingdom
- Areas of the village: List: Bardney Dairies; Bucknall (Village); Kingthorpe; Southrey (Village); Tupholme (Village); Waddingworth (Village)
- Post town: LINCOLN
- Postcode district: LN3
- Dialling code: 01526
- Police: Lincolnshire
- Fire: Lincolnshire
- Ambulance: East Midlands
- UK Parliament: Gainsborough

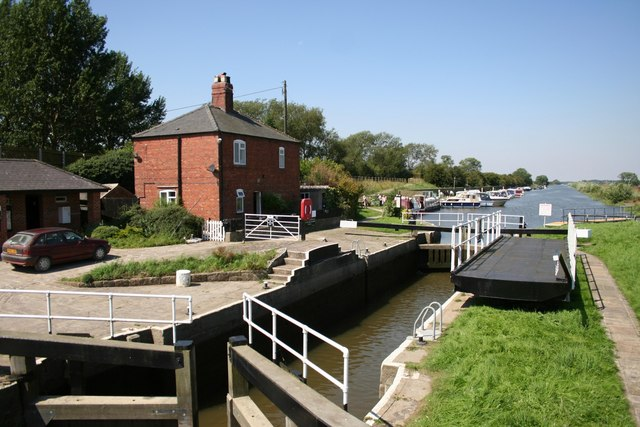
Bardney lock, where old and new courses of the Witham meet.

Bardney is a village and civil parish in the West Lindsey district of Lincolnshire, England. The population of the civil parish was 1,643 at the 2001 census increasing to 1,848 (including Southrey) at the 2011 census. The village sits on the east bank of the River Witham, 9 miles (14 km) east of Lincoln.

== History ==
Two Roman artefacts have been found in Bardney: a gemstone and a coin. Nearby villages show evidence of Roman settlement, particularly Potterhanworth Booths and Branston Booths.

The place-name is Old English in origin, and means "island of a man called Bearda". It occurs in the Anglo-Saxon Chronicle, under the year 716, as "Bearddanig", and in the Domesday Book of 1086 as "Bardenai".

Once the site of a mediaeval abbey, ruined in Henry VIII's dissolution of the monasteries, the village became prosperous through agricultural improvement in the 19th century. Improved transport, first on the river and then with the arrival of several railways, caused considerable expansion between the traditional centre of the village and the former riverside settlement of Bardney Ferry. In 1894 the ferry was replaced by the present bridge. A British Sugar factory, built in 1927, survived the closure of the railways but ceased processing on 9 February 2001.

=== Bardney Abbey ===
Bardney Abbey was founded before 679, perhaps as a double house of monks and nuns, and perhaps as a minster. It was destroyed by the Danes circa 860. Refounded 1087 as a priory, it became a Benedictine Abbey in 1115, and was dissolved in 1538.

=== Lost villages ===
Near the Abbey is the site of the deserted medieval village of Butyate, which was demolished in 1959, and converted to farmland.

Another abandoned village, north of modern Bardney, is associated with the former chapels of St Lawrence and St Andrew.

== Demographics ==
At the 2021 census, Bardney's built up area had a population of 2,069. Of the findings, the ethnicity and religious composition of the ward was:

Bardney: Ethnicity: 2021 Census
Ethnic group	Population	%
White	2,024	97.8%
Mixed	28	1.4%
Asian or Asian British	15	0.7%
Other Ethnic Group	1	0.1%
Arab	1	0.1%
Total	2,069	100%

The religious composition of the ward at the 2021 Census was recorded as:

Bardney: Religion: 2021 Census
Religious	Population	%
Christian	1,133	58.2%
Irreligious	789	40.5%
Other religion	12	0.6%
Buddhist	4	0.2%
Hindu	4	0.2%
Sikh	3	0.2%
Jewish	2	0.1%
Muslim	1	0.1%
Total	2,069	100%

=== Transport ===
The river Witham has been used for commercial shipping for centuries, and has been straightened and improved many times including in 1753 and 1812. A straight course (new cut) was made at Bardney and the lock built in 1770 was re-built in 1865.

In 1870, Bardney had a station which was a junction for the Branch Line to Louth via Wragby and the Lincolnshire Loop Line. The Louth to Bardney Line closed as well as the Loop Line in 1970 although the section north of Wragby closed prior to 1958–1969. The station building survives and is a listed building. The route of the old railway has been converted into a cycle-track, known as Water Rail Way, which follows the river between Lincoln and Boston. The name of the cycle track refers to the river, the railway, and a wetland bird found in the area, the water rail.

=== Great Western Express Festival ===
In 1972, the nearby ruin of Tupholme Abbey was the setting for the Great Western Express Festival, a four-day pop concert (also known as the Bardney Festival). Funded by Lord Harlech and the actor Stanley Baker (amongst others), the event attracted 30,000 people. Amongst the artistes playing were Roxy Music and Status Quo and, for two nights running, the Rory Gallagher Band. Despite its popularity the show lost money, due mainly to bad weather which blighted the event.

== Community ==
The grade I listed Church of St Lawrence is part of the Bardney Group of the Deanery of Horncastle in the Diocese of Lincoln. There is also an active Methodist chapel on Church Lane. The present building has been in use from 1903 and it replaced an early church. The current minister is the Rev'd Gordon Davis.

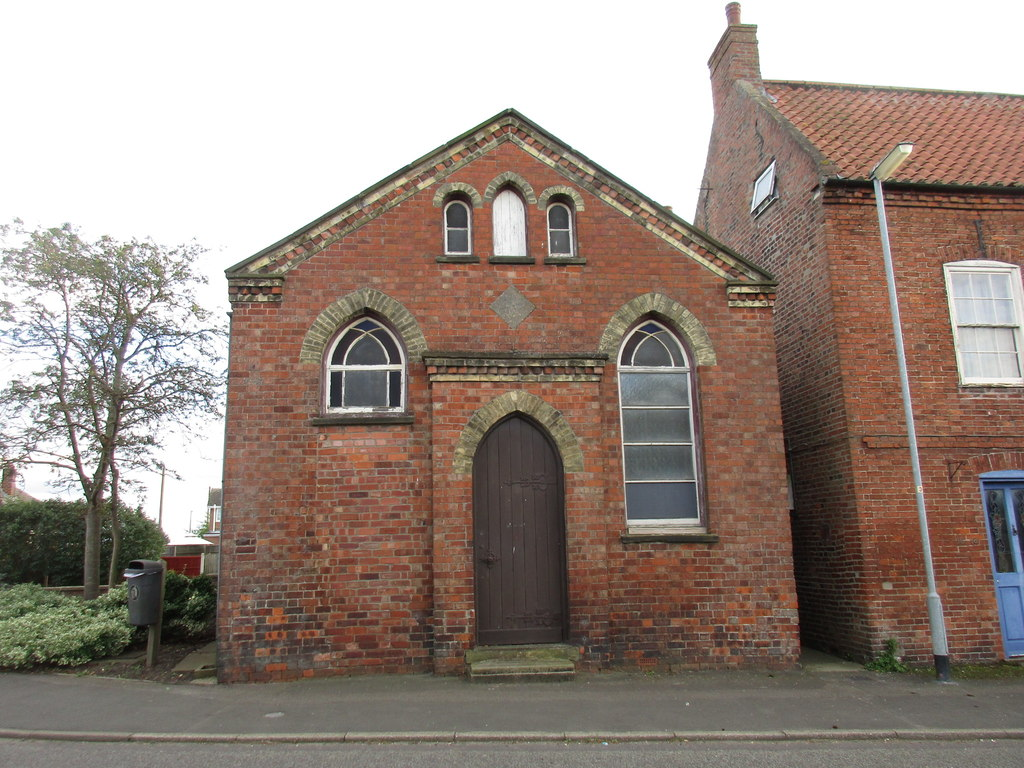
Salvation Army Chapel

The former Salvation Army Chapel was originally built in 1882 and later converted from a place of worship to a teacher training school before being closed and seemingly abandoned. It is not a listed building but is within the Bardney conservation area.

The modern primary school, Bardney Church of England and Methodist Primary School, was opened in 1983. It replaced two earlier schools merged in 1964. The village has pre-school facilities, including Bardney Mother and Toddler Group which meets at the Methodist Hall, a butcher's shop, a general store and one public house

The tenth anniversary of Bardney Gala took place in 2018 on August Bank Holiday Sunday. It is a traditional event consisting of crafts, trade and community stands, funfair rides, bar and BBQ, sports, children's races, car boot sale, classic vehicle display, and an Exemption Dog Show.

=== Administration ===
Originally part of the Wraggoe Wapentake, and of the Lincoln poor law union in the Parts of Lindsey, the parish is now part of West Lindsey District, and Lincolnshire County Council.

The civil parish has become part of a group that consists of Bardney, Apley and Stainfield parishes. The villages of Southrey and Kingthorpe are also included.

The 2011 electoral arrangements are:

- West Lindsey District Council, Bardney ward councillor: Ian Fleetwood
- Lincolnshire County Council councillor: Ian Fleetwood
- Westminster, Gainsborough constituency Member of Parliament: Edward Leigh
- Until 2020 Bardney was also represented in the European Parliament, by the East Midlands MEPs:

== Sister city ==
- (fr) (France) – La Bazoge, Sarthe

== Geography and ecology ==
Bardney lies between 7 and 17 metres above sea level, on the edge of the present-day Lincolnshire Fens, but its name indicates that before the fens were drained for agriculture (from the 17th century onwards) it was surrounded with wet fenland. Nowadays the Lincolnshire Fens are mostly unflooded, very flat and very productive arable farmland. Wildlife observed on the fens near Bardney includes barn owl, red fox and hemlock.

Bardney is surrounded by ancient woodlands composed primarily of lime trees, known collectively as Bardney Limewoods. Lime forests are rare in the United Kingdom, where oak is generally the dominant climatic climax species. The flora of the woodlands is indicative of ancient woodland, including Allium ursinum, Hyacinthoides non-scripta and Circaea lutetiana, as well as several species of wild orchids. Wildlife in the limewoods includes deer, Eurasian jay, European hornet and purple hairstreak butterfly.

In 2017 a white-billed diver was observed on the River Witham at Bardney. This is an Arctic species which seldom visits the United Kingdom.

== See also ==
- The Fens
- RAF Bardney
- Tupholme
- Bardney Abbey
- River Witham
- National Cycle Route 1#Norwich to Lincoln
- Louth to Bardney Line
- Lincolnshire loop line
- Bardney railway station
- Bardney Limewoods
