= East Barkwith railway station =

Disused railway station in Lincolnshire, England

East Barkwith
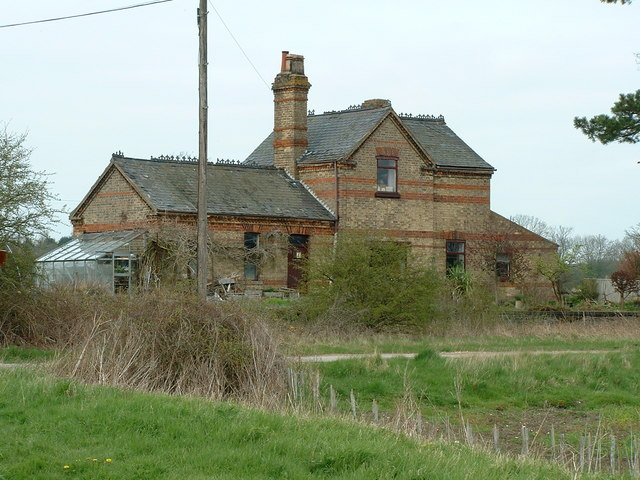
- Former station building

General information
- Location: East Barkwith, East Lindsey; England
- Coordinates: 53.3141°N 0.2426°W
- Grid reference: TF171812
- Platforms: 1

Other information
- Status: Disused

History
- Original company: Louth and Lincoln Railway
- Pre-grouping: Great Northern Railway
- Post-grouping: London and North Eastern Railway

Key dates
- 9 Nov 1874: Opened (goods)
- 1 Dec 1876: Station opened to passengers
- 5 Nov 1951: closed (passenger)
- 1 Dec 1958: closed to all traffic
Location

East Barkwith railway station was a railway station that served the village of East Barkwith, Lincolnshire, England between 1874 and 1958, on the Louth to Bardney line.

== History ==
The Louth and Lincoln Railway planned and built a branch line from Bardney to Louth in stages, the first stage between Bardney and South Willingham and Hainton opened to goods traffic on 9 November 1874. South Willingham acted as a terminus until South Willingham Tunnel was completed. The line then opened to Donington on Bain on 27 September 1875, still goods traffic only.

The line was completed through to Louth for goods traffic on 6 August 1876 and opened to passengers on 1 December 1876. It was absorbed by the Great Northern Railway in 1882.

The station was located 137 miles 73 chains from London Kings Cross via Spalding, Boston and Bardney. The branch was mostly single track and the station had only one platform. A signal box was located at East Barkwith, to control the block, the level crossing over Panton Road and the small goods yard. The yard had a siding serving a cattle dock. There was no loop at East Barkwith to allow trains to pass one another but connections to the sidings allowed the train's engine to run round a few wagons. At the road entrance to the goods yard was a weighbridge and office.

The station building included living accommodation for the Station Master and his family as well as a booking office and waiting room. Architecturally, the building was in the same style as others on the line; built of brick with a number of brick string courses of a contrasting colour. The number and appearance of the string courses differed on each station; at East Barkwith, the general bricks were a lighter colour with darker string course bricks.

The signal box was of timber construction.

=== Passenger service ===
When the line opened five passenger trains a day were provided, but this was quickly reduced to 4, with 5 on Fridays. At the start of the Second World War the service was suspended for three months. When it was reinstated in December 1939 the timetable was reduced to three trains in each direction and the 1950 timetable shows that this arrangement continued after the war until closure. Although originally intended to run to Lincoln, trains on the line only ran between Louth and Bardney; passengers had to change at Bardney to get to Lincoln. Trains were timetabled to get to Wragby in 7 minutes, and Bardney in 18 minutes, with a connection to Lincoln taking a further 25 minutes. In the other direction, trains took 13 minutes to get to Donington and 29 minutes to arrive in Louth (these are sample times and varied during the day and in the direction travelled).

Passenger services ended on 5 November 1951, goods traffic on 1 December 1958.

=== After Closure ===
The track was lifted in 1961 and the signal box demolished. The station building became a private residence but has generally retained its original appearance. The platform mostly remains, and a farm track uses the course of the railway to both sides of Panton Road.

== Route ==
| Preceding station | Disused railways | Following station |
|---|---|---|
| Wragby; Line and station closed | Great Northern Railway; Louth to Bardney line | South Willingham; Line and station closed |
