= Kingthorpe =

Hamlet in the West Lindsey district of Lincolnshire, England

Coordinates: 53.2601°N 0.308302°W

- Location within Lincolnshire
- OS grid reference: TF129750
  - London: 125 mi (201 km) S
- District: West Lindsey
- Shire county: Lincolnshire
- Region: East Midlands
- Country: England
- Sovereign state: United Kingdom
- Post town: Market Rasen
- Postcode district: LN8
- Police: Lincolnshire
- Fire: Lincolnshire
- Ambulance: East Midlands
- UK Parliament: Gainsborough

Kingthorpe is a hamlet in the West Lindsey district of Lincolnshire, England. The hamlet is in the civil parish of Apley, and is 10 miles (16 km) east from the city of Lincoln and 9 miles (14 km) south from the market town of Market Rasen. It sits on the B1202 road from Wragby to Bardney, and 1 mile (1.6 km) to the east from the parish village of Apley.

Kingthorp is one of five 'villages' represented in the Bardney Group Parish Council.

The hamlet contains two Grade II listed late 18th-century brick farmhouses: Kingthorpe Farmhouse and Manor Farmhouse.

== History ==
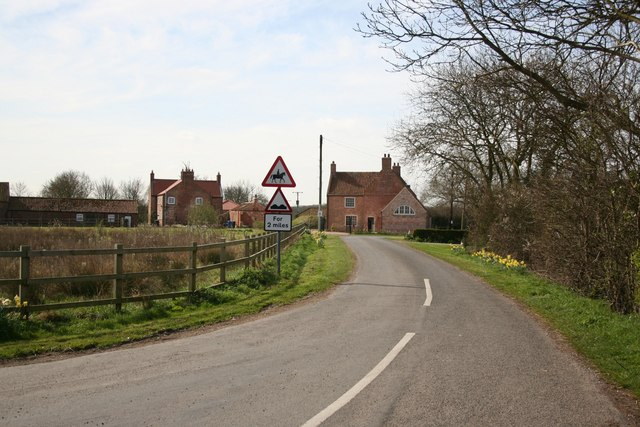
Kingthorpe

In the Domesday account Kingthorpe is written as "Chinetorp", in the Wraggoe Hundred of the South Riding of Lindsey. In 1086 it consisted of 10 villagers, 15 households, land for 1.9 ploughlands, with 1 lord's plough team and 1 men's plough team. There was 15 acres (0.061 km^{2}) of meadow and 80 acres (0.32 km^{2}) of woodland. In 1066 lordship of the manor was held by Bergthorr and Thorulf, being transferred to Odo in 1086 with Ivo Taillebois as Tenant-in-chief. The Lincolnshire Domesday and the Lindsey Survey transcribed the Domesday entry as: "In Chinetorp (Kingthorpe(Wraggoe)] Bertoe and Thorald (Torul) had 7.5 bovates and the third part of half a bovate [assessed] to the geld. There is arable land for twice as many teams and oxen. Odo, Ivo's man, has one team there in demesne, and 10 villeins with one team, and 15 acres of meadow, and 80 acres of woodland for pannage throughout the territory[...] it was worth 50 shillings; now 40 shillings."

According to 19th- and 20th-century trade directories Kingthorpe is a centre for growing wheat, barley, and oats. There were two farmers in 1855, with Kingthorpe described as 'a farm'. The lord of the manor and principal landowner was T. T. Drake (1817-1888), son to the late Thomas Tyrwhitt-Drake MP. At the time Kingthorpe Station on the Louth and Lincoln branch railway was extant but, according to Kelly's, by 1933 it had disappeared. In 1933 there were four farmers.

Kingthorpe railway station was on a line opened in 1876, and closed in 1956; there is no remaining evidence of the station which was situated 300 yards (274 m) east from the hamlet.
