= Southrey Wood =

Woodland in Lincolnshire, England

Coordinates: 53.200°N 0.315°W

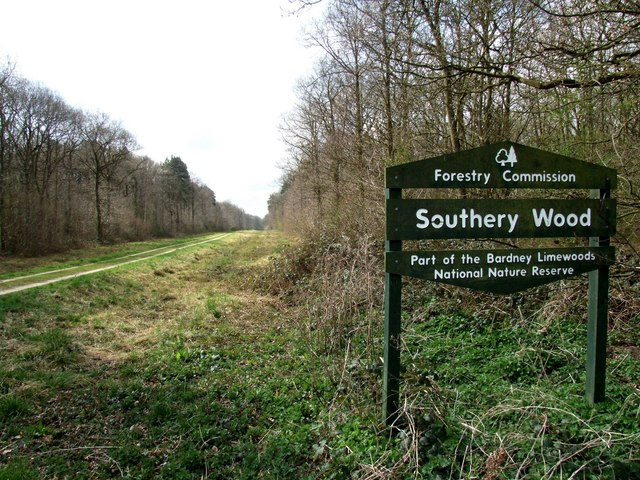
Southrey wood entrance; the sign reads Southery Wood

Southrey Wood is reserve near Bardney in the county of Lincolnshire, England. Butterfly Conservation manages this reserve. It is 22 acres (8.9 ha) in extent.

The woodland forms part of the Bardney Limewoods National Nature Reserve.
