= Kingthorpe railway station =

Disused railway station in Lincolnshire, England

Kingthorpe

General information
- Location: Kingthorpe, East Lindsey; England
- Coordinates: 53.2583°N 0.3034°W
- Grid reference: TF133748
- Platforms: 1

Other information
- Status: Disused

History
- Original company: Louth and Lincoln Railway
- Pre-grouping: Great Northern Railway
- Post-grouping: London and North Eastern Railway

Key dates
- 9 November 1874: Opened (goods)
- 1 December 1876: Station opened to passengers
- 5 November 1951: closed (passenger)
- 15 September 1956: Goods Yard closed
- 1 February 1960: Line closed to all traffic
Location

Kingthorpe railway station was a railway station that served the village of Kingthorpe, Lincolnshire, England between 1874 and 1956, on the Louth to Bardney line.

== History ==
The Louth and Lincoln Railway planned and built a branch line from Bardney to Louth in stages, the first stage between Bardney and South Willingham and Hainton opened to goods traffic on 9 November 1874. South Willingham acted as a terminus until South Willingham Tunnel was completed. The line then opened to Donington on Bain on 27 September 1875, still goods traffic only.

The line was completed through to Louth for goods traffic on 6 August 1876 and opened to passengers on 1 December 1876. It was absorbed by the Great Northern Railway in 1882.

The station was located 133 miles 05 chains from London Kings Cross via Spalding, Boston and Bardney. The branch was mostly single track and the station had only one platform. A signal box was located at Kingthorpe, to control the block, and the small goods yard. The yard had only one siding serving a cattle dock. There was no loop at Kingthorpe to allow trains to pass one another but connections to the siding allowed the train's engine to run round a few wagons. At the road entrance to the goods yard was a weighbridge and office. The B1202 Wragby to Bardney road crossed the railway on an overbridge at the south end of the platform.

The station building included living accommodation for the Station Master and his family as well as a booking office and waiting room. Architecturally, the building was in the same style as others on the line; built of brick with a number of brick string courses of a contrasting colour. The number and appearance of the string courses differed on each station; at Kingthorpe, the general bricks were a darker colour with lighter string course bricks. The station building was on the bank of Stainfield beck, and as a result the beck bisected the platform. It was carried across the beck on a bridge; the beck was too large to culvert. The track crossed the beck on a waybeam bridge, which can be seen in the photograph.

The signal box was of timber construction and was at the north end of the platform.

=== Passenger service ===
When the line opened five passenger trains a day were provided, but this was quickly reduced to 4, with 5 on Fridays. At the start of the Second World War the service was suspended for three months. When it was reinstated in December 1939 the timetable was reduced to three trains in each direction and the 1950 timetable shows that this arrangement continued after the war until closure. Although originally intended to run to Lincoln, trains on the line only ran between Louth and Bardney; passengers had to change at Bardney to get to Lincoln. Trains were timetabled to get to Bardney in 7 minutes, with a connection to Lincoln taking a further 25 minutes. In the other direction, trains took 7 minutes to get to Wragby and 40 minutes to arrive in Louth (these are sample times and varied during the day and in the direction travelled).

Passenger services ended on 5 November 1951, goods traffic on 15 September 1956. However, the track through the station remained open for a further three years until 1 February 1960 to serve Wragby goods yard. The signal box was reduced to a ground frame in the locking room (the room under the signal box) sometime after closure to passengers and before 1953.

=== After Closure ===
The track was lifted in 1961. The station building was demolished and no trace remains. The bridge carrying the B1202 was demolished and the road realigned sometime between 2010 and 2019.

== Route ==
Preceding station	Disused railways	Following station
Bardney; Line and station closed	Great Northern Railway; Louth to Bardney line	Wragby; Line and station closed
