= Withcall =

Village and civil parish in Lincolnshire, England

Coordinates: 53.3353°N 0.0750°W

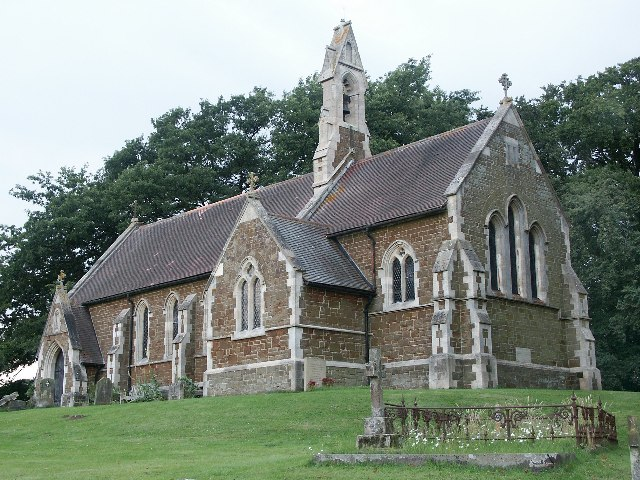
- The church of St Martin, Withcall

- Location within Lincolnshire
- OS grid reference: TF326874
  - London: 125 mi (201 km) S
- Shire county: Lincolnshire
- Region: East Midlands
- Country: England
- Sovereign state: United Kingdom
- Post town: LOUTH
- Postcode district: LN11
- Dialling code: 01507
- Police: Lincolnshire
- Fire: Lincolnshire
- Ambulance: East Midlands
- UK Parliament: Louth and Horncastle

Withcall is a small farming village and civil parish in the East Lindsey district of Lincolnshire, England. It lies within the Lincolnshire Wolds, and 4 miles (6.4 km) south-west from Louth.

== Early history ==
The name Withcall is derived from its Roman name Vita cala, the area being occupied by Romans from AD 82–410. By 1066, following the Viking invasion, begun in 793, the village was known as Vio-Kior.

The Vikings were ejected from the country following their defeat at the Battle of Stamford Bridge in 1066. By 1086 land in the Withcall area was owned by Bishop Odo of Bayeux, the maternal half-brother of William the Conqueror, who was for a period second in power after the King of England.

William's Domesday Book, of 1086, a grand survey of the country to assist in the levying of taxes, recorded 300 inhabitants in the village.

During the seventeenth century, a lot of the surrounding land was turned over to sheep grazing. Joan Thirsk, in her England Peasant Farming, of 1957, reports the Lord of Withcall 'was preparing in 1681 to change the Westfield from crop-growing to the keeping of sheep'.

Withcall House dates from around 1830 though a number of extensions have been added subsequently while the Old Rectory in the village was designed by S. S. Teulon and dates from 1849.

== Experiments with Mechanised Farming ==
In 1880, the Withcall estate was owned by Nathaniel Clayton (1811–1890) who, with his brother-in-law, Joseph Shuttleworth (1819–1883), set up the Clayton & Shuttleworth engineering company in Lincoln in 1842. They began constructing portable steam engines in 1845 and presented their work at the Great Exhibition of 1851. They soon became one of the leading makers of agricultural machines in the country.[5]

Clayton treated the Withcall estate as "an experiment in highly capitalised and mechanised farming". Robinson reports one contemporary commentator: "Large flocks of fine Lincoln, long wooled sheep are bred and fed on turnips and grass seed and numbers of large short horned castle are bred and fed in the yards during the winter on roots, cake, corn and straw. By pursuing this system of farming the Wolds are kept in the highest state of cultivation that such a soil can be: they are made to produce magnificent crops of turnips, and they turn out a class of sheep which have long been famous".

== Withcall Station ==
The village was served by Withcall railway station, a small station halt on the long-since defunct Louth to Bardney line. A section of the platform edge remains, and there is a well-preserved tunnel close by. Work on the building of the tunnel started in January 1852 and the tunnel is 971 yards (888 m) long. The first passenger train passed through the tunnel in 1876 and the last train in 1956.

The Withcall station was the second one west of Louth on the line. Building of the 971-yard tunnel (now abandoned to bats) to cut through the hills at Withcall began in January 1872 (the tunnel at nearby South Willingham is shorter). Adrian S. Pye writes: "Construction was delayed by bad weather and in October 1874, a deluge of water washed navvies out of the tunnel. Bricklayers went on strike because their hands were being scalded by wet lime and December saw the death of a workman (Cornelius Janaway) who was struck by a wagon."

Withcall's tiny wooden station continued as a Methodist chapel until being demolished in the mid-1980s. A metal plaque commemorates the station but it has the date wrong for the opening.
