= All Saints Church, Wragby =

Anglican church in Wragby, Lincolnshire, England

- Church of All Saints, Wragby
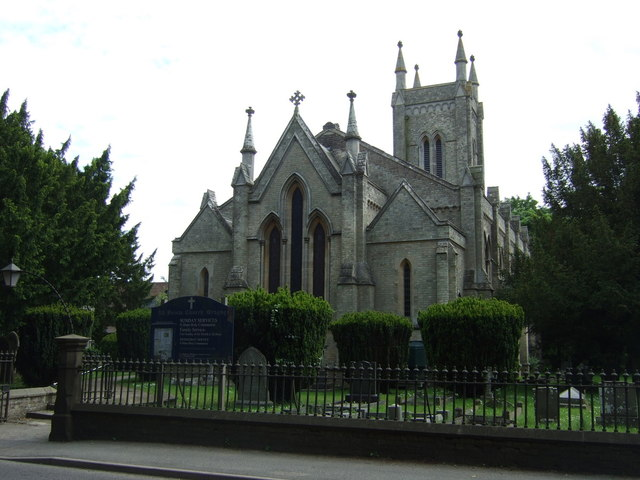
- All Saints Church, Wragby
- All Saints Church, Wragby
- 53.286460°N 0.299044°W
- OS grid reference: TF 13457 77972
- Location: Wragby, East Lindsey, Lincolnshire
- Country: England
- Denomination: Church of England
- Website: www.wragbygroupofparishes.org.uk/wragb1/page2/

History
- Status: Parish Church
- Dedication: All Saints
- Dedicated: 1838
- Consecrated: 1838

Architecture
- Functional status: Active
- Heritage designation: Grade II
- Completed: 1838

Specifications
- Capacity: 330

Administration
- Province: Canterbury
- Diocese: Lincoln
- Parish: Wragby

All Saints Church is the parish church of the town of Wragby in Lincolnshire, England. It is dedicated to All Saints and is a Grade II listed building. It is located on Church Street and to the east of the town centre. The tower is a prominent landmark in the town.

== History ==
The present church was built in 1838 as a replacement of an older medieval church. It is constructed of yellow pale brick and limestone, with ashlar dressings. Nicholas Antram, in his Lincolnshire volume in the Pevsner Buildings of England series, revised and reissued in 2002, records the architect as W. A. Nicholson, and describes the style as of the Commissioners' church type. The older church was deemed redundant and was demolished in the 1980s to allow for an expansion of the nearby cemetery. The site is designated as a scheduled monument. All Saints is a Grade II listed building and contains some important stained glass.

== Present day ==
The church serves as a local landmark and a place of worship and community gatherings. In 2015 the Rector applied for permission to reduce the height of nine yew trees in the churchyard which date back nearly 200 years. Supported by the Diocese of Lincoln and some local residents and parishioners, he argued that the size of the trees obscured views of the church, and particularly of the clock in the church tower. East Lindsey District Council denied permission for the pruning of the trees, saying that "the proposed works would be excessive and unjustified", and instead imposed a tree preservation order on them.

== Gallery ==
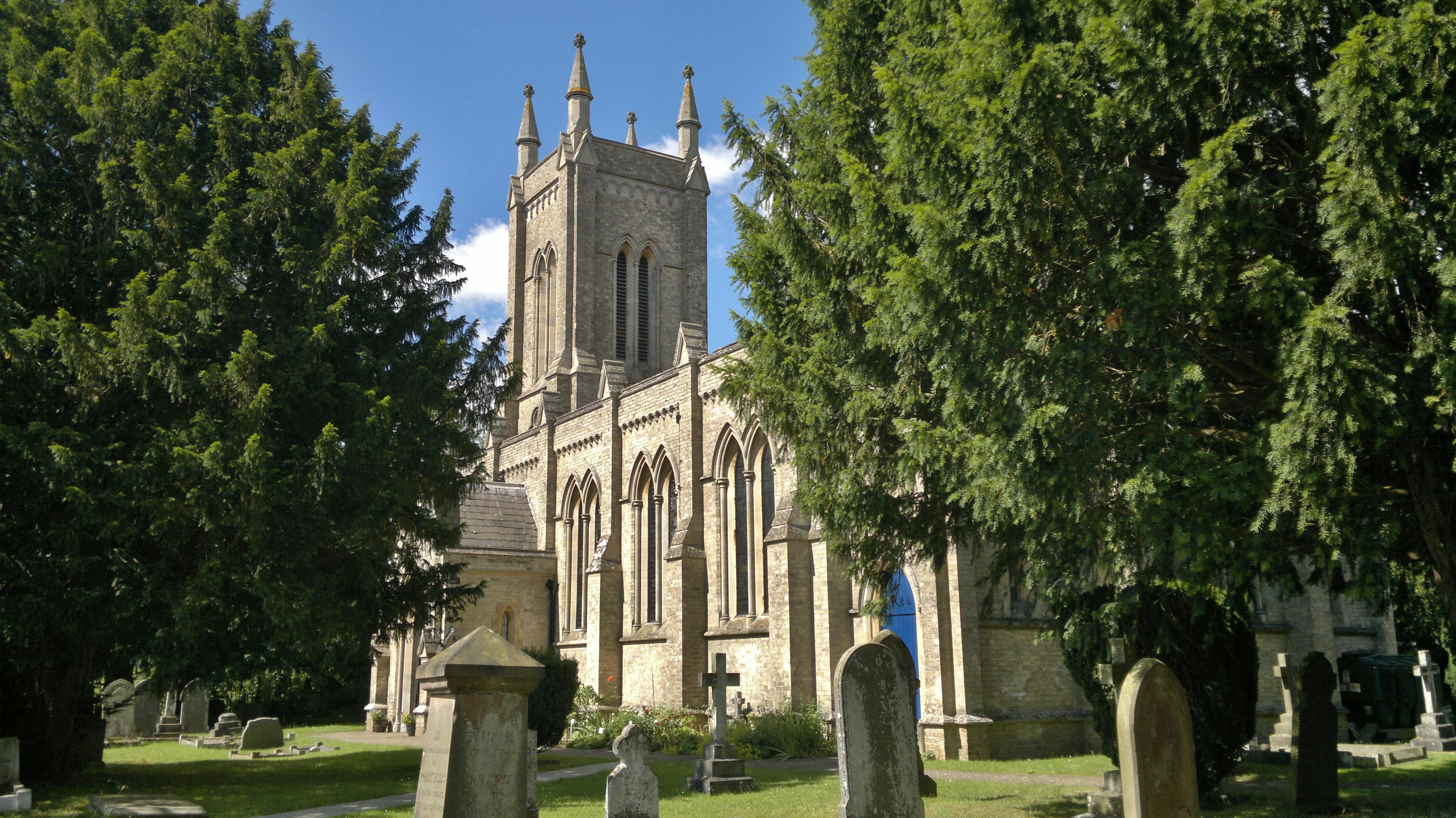
The church and the yew trees

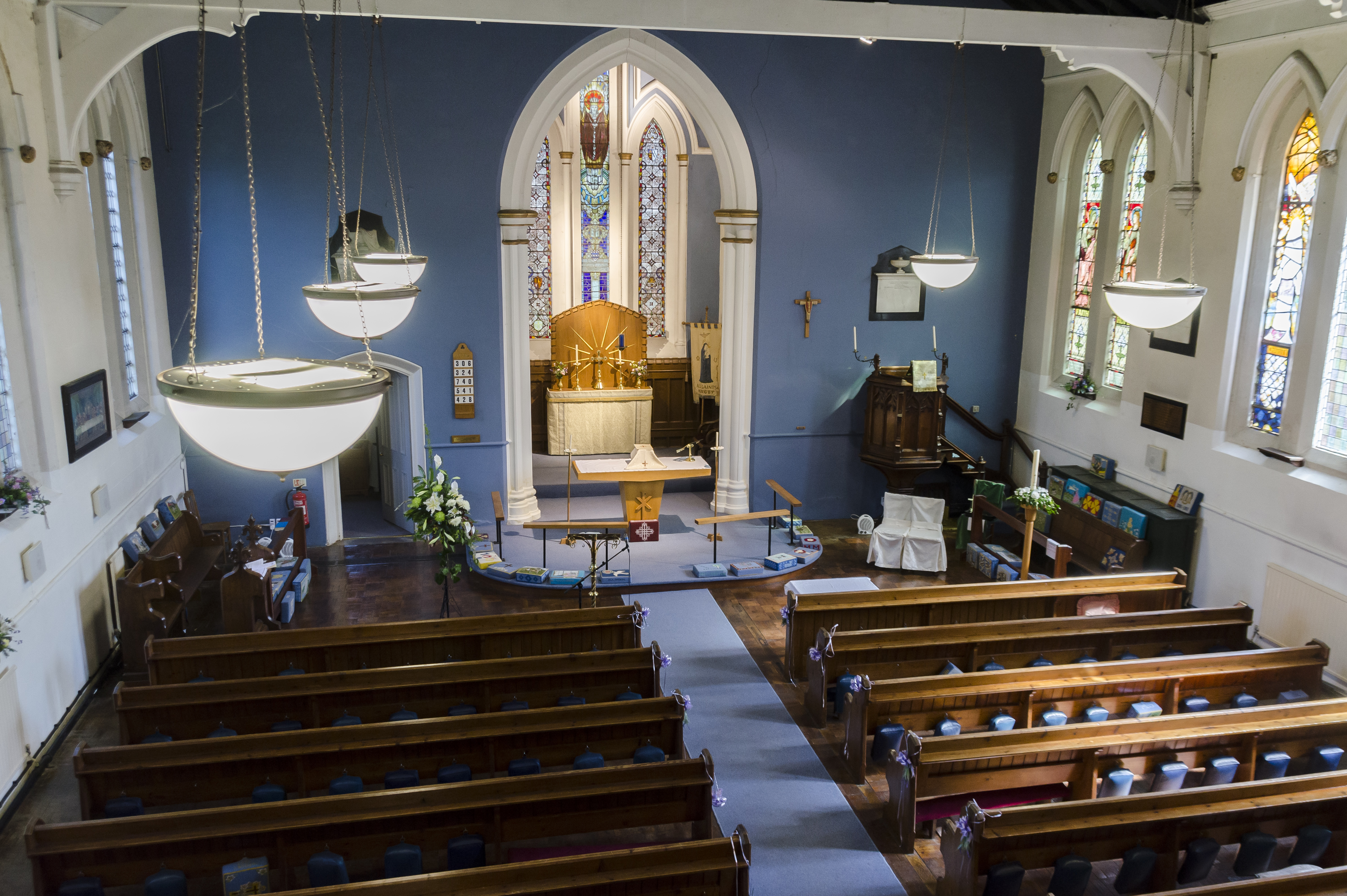
Interior

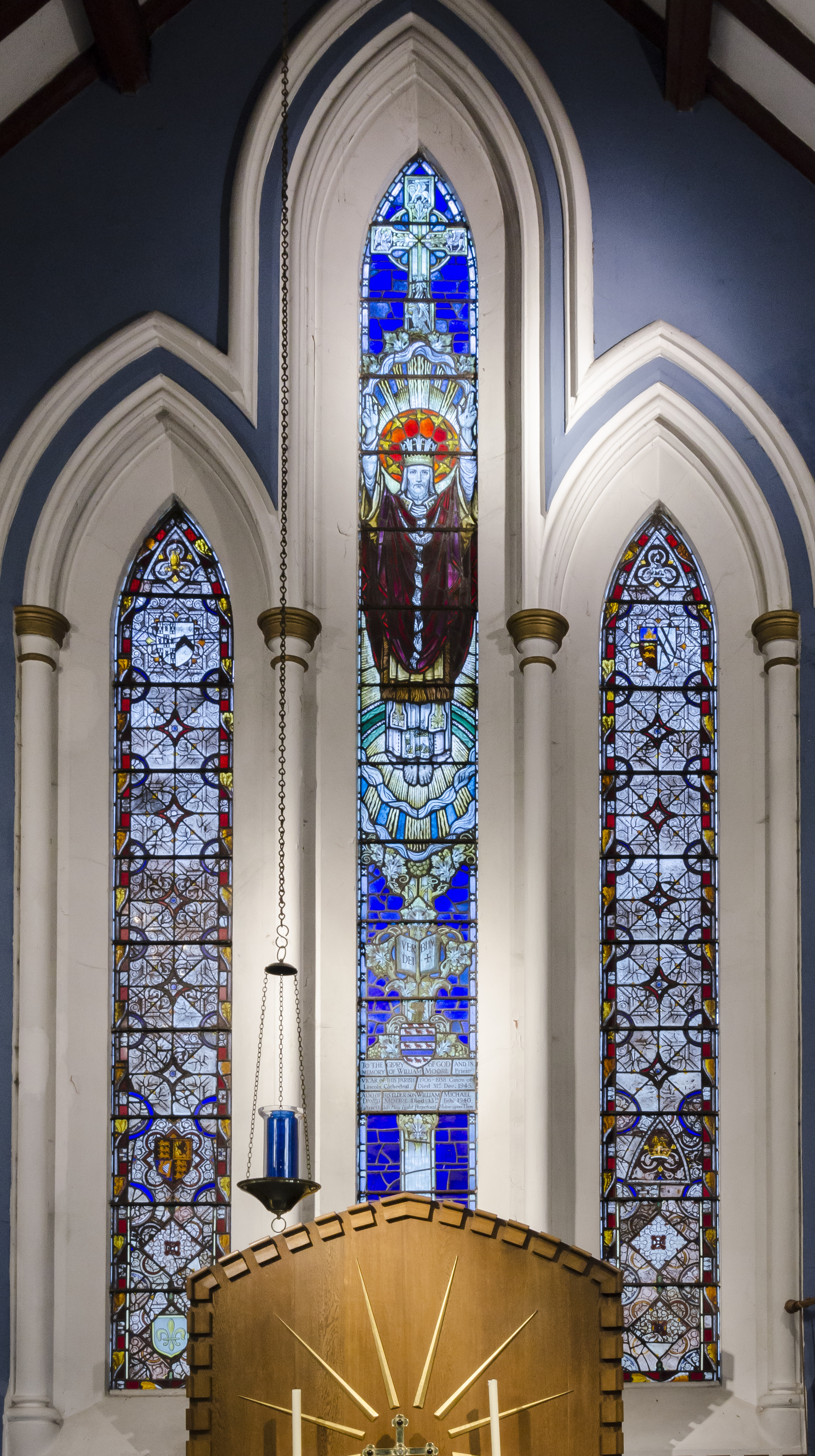
East window

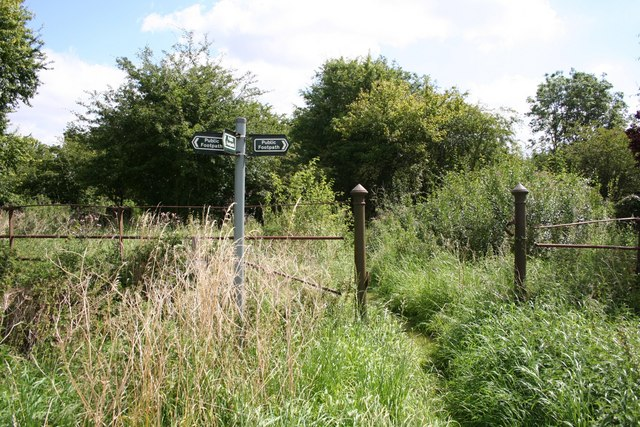
The site of the old medieval church and graveyard. The church survived until 1980 before it was demolished after expansion of the churchyard

== Sources ==
- Bonnette, Denise (2023). Redundancy, Community and Heritage in the Modern Church of England, 1945–2000: Closing the Church Door. Springer Nature. ISBN 978-3-031-17597-8.
- Pevsner, Nikolaus; Harris, John; Antram, Nicholas (2002). Lincolnshire. The Buildings of England. New Haven, US and London: Yale University Press. ISBN 0-300-09620-8.
