= Bardney Limewoods =

Nature reserve in Lincolnshire, England

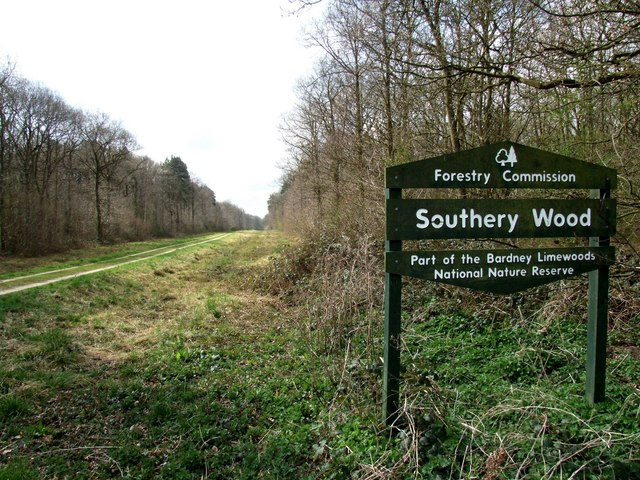
Southrey wood entrance.

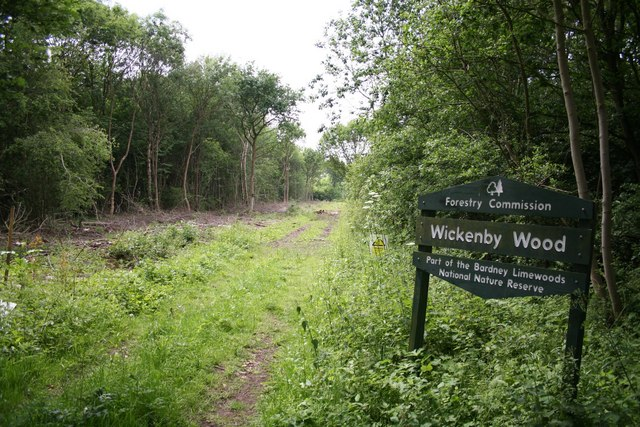
Wickenby wood entrance.

The Bardney Limewoods, part of the Lincolnshire Limewoods National Nature Reserve is a collection of small woodlands near Bardney in Lincolnshire. The reserve includes about half the Limewoods in the area. Cocklode Wood, part of the Bardney Limewoods, is the best surviving spread of medieval limes in England.

The Limewoods are diverse in tree species and ground species, but are dominated by the Small-leaved Lime Tilia cordata.

Some have argued that the name Lincolnshire refers to lime trees (known as Lind in old English and Linden in modern German), however it is more widely held that Lincoln derives from the Celtic 'Lindon' for pool and refers to the Brayford Pool.

Bardney Limewoods NNR is managed by the Forestry Commission. A visitors‘ centre is maintained at Chambers Wood Farm. The NNR is said to include a quarter of the county's ancient woodland.

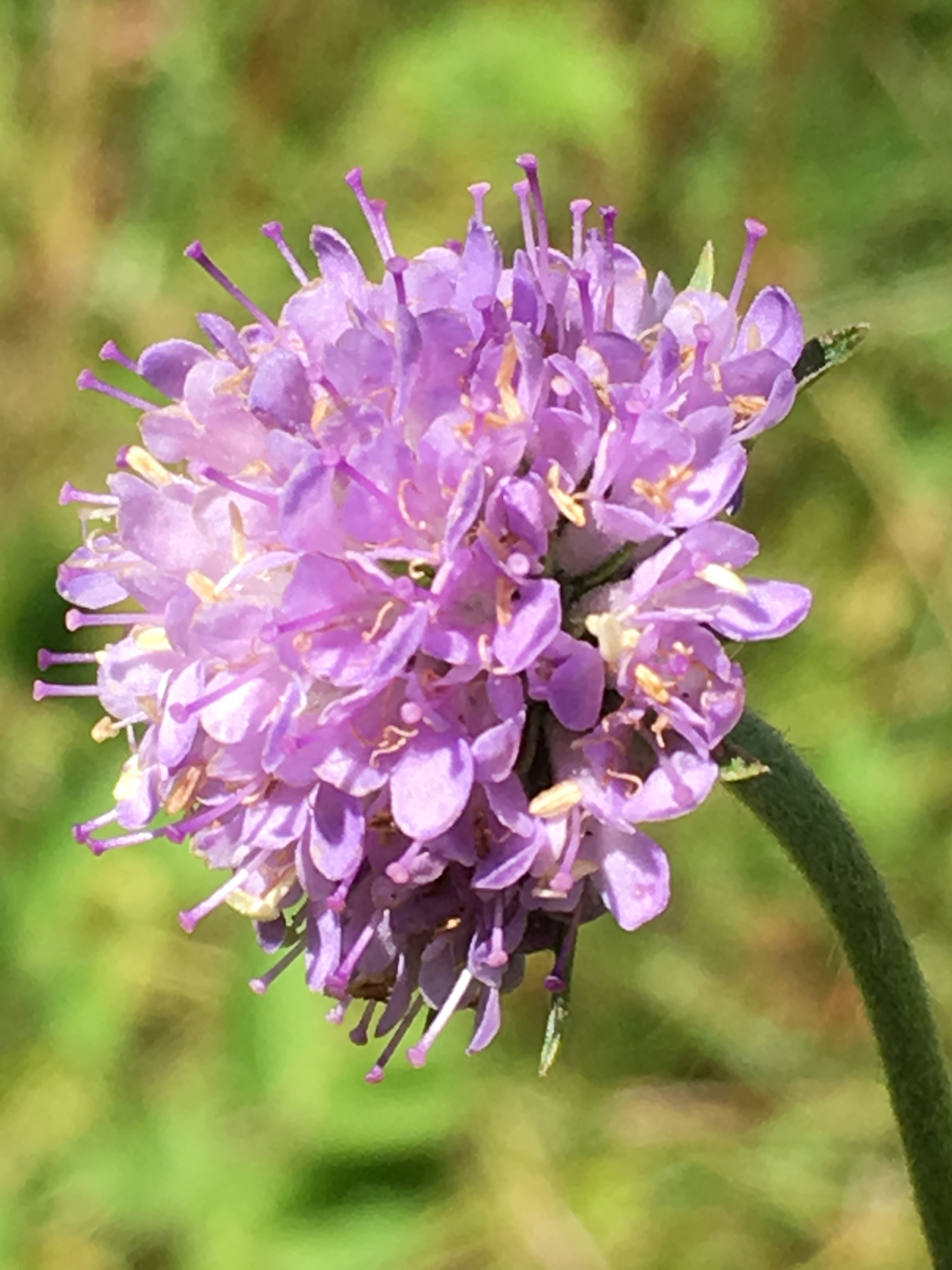
Succisa pratensis at Southrey Wood in 2018

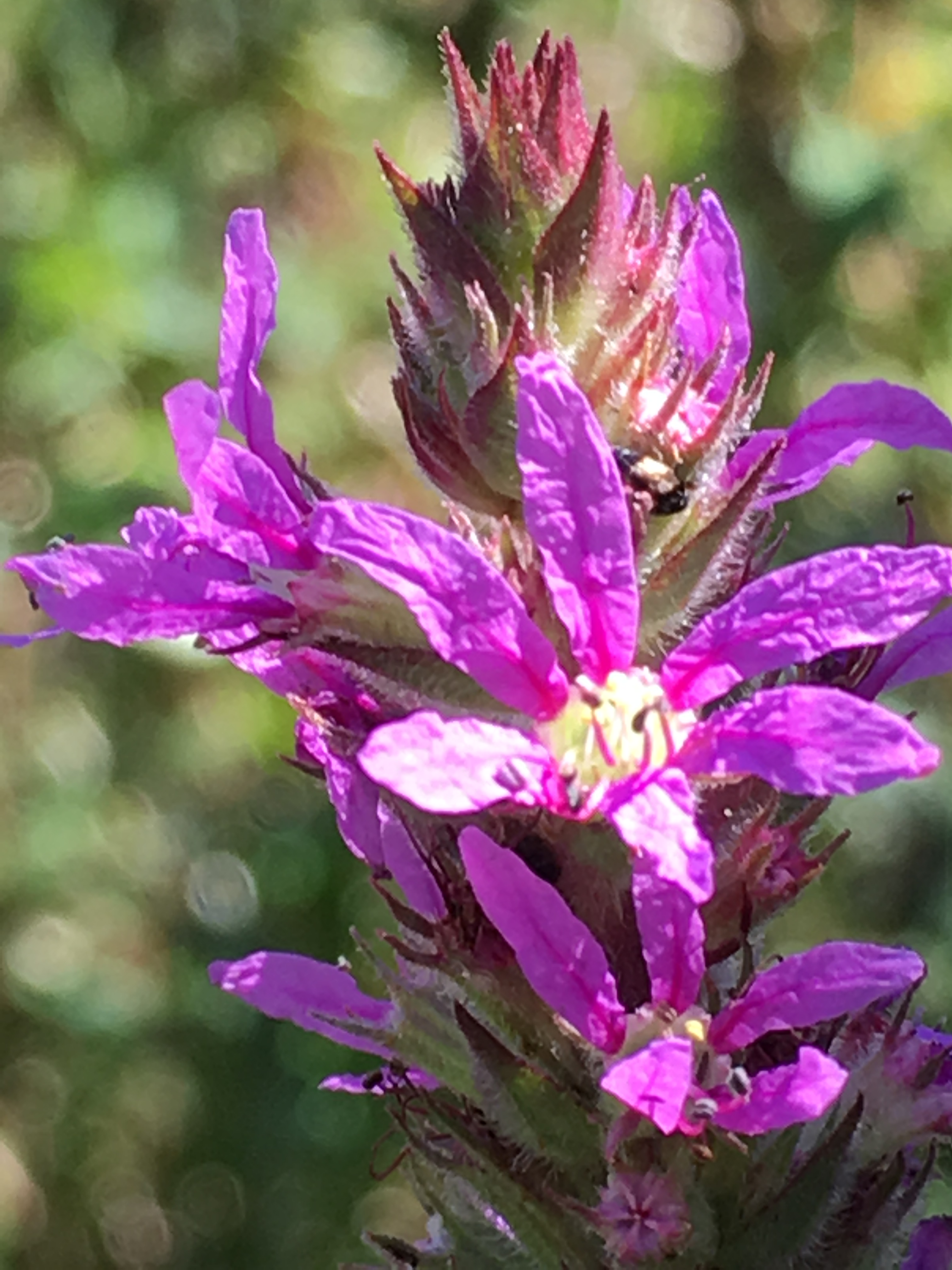
Lythrum salicaria in Southrey Wood in 2018

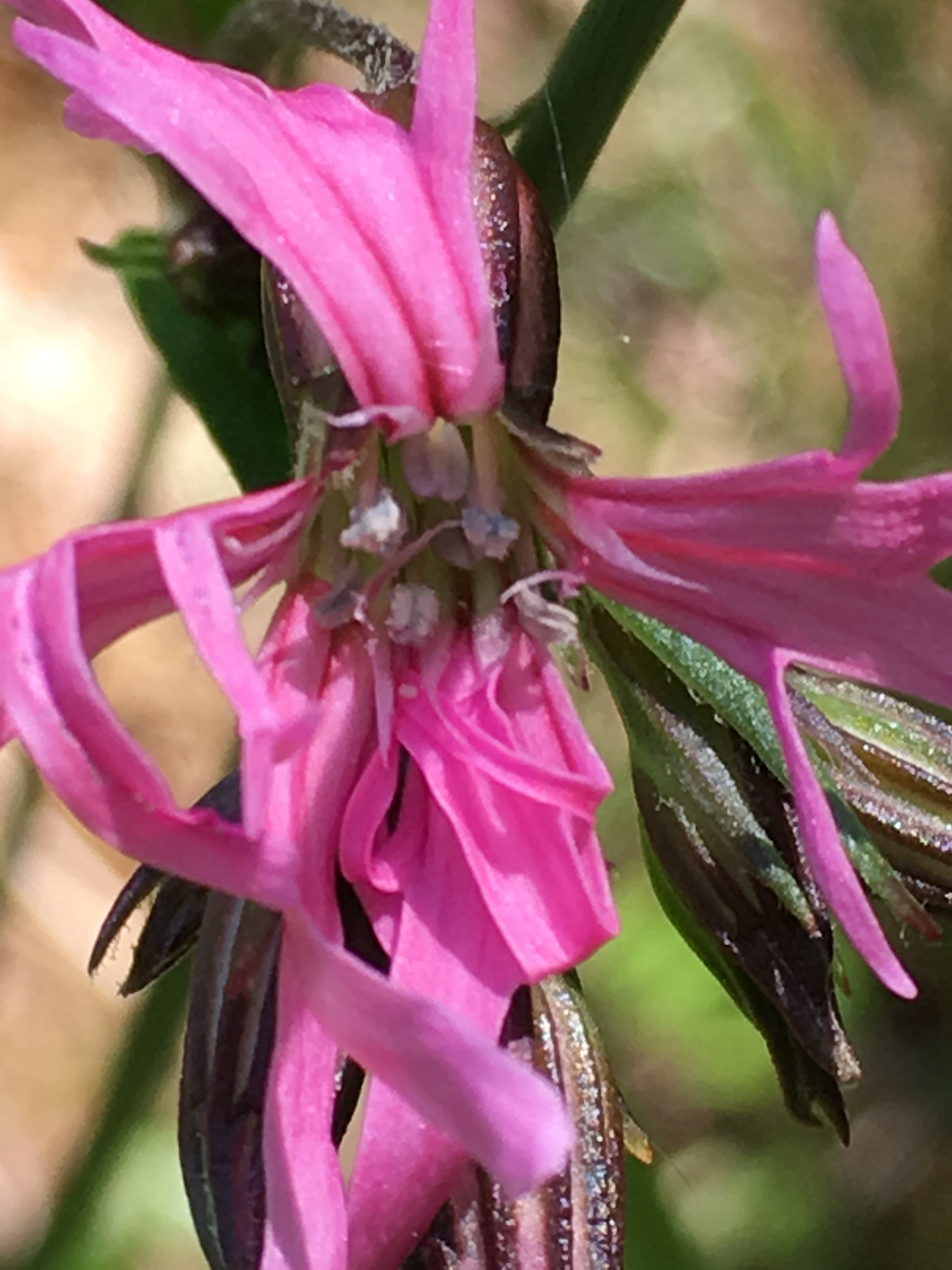
Lychnis flos-cuculi in Gosling Corner in 2018

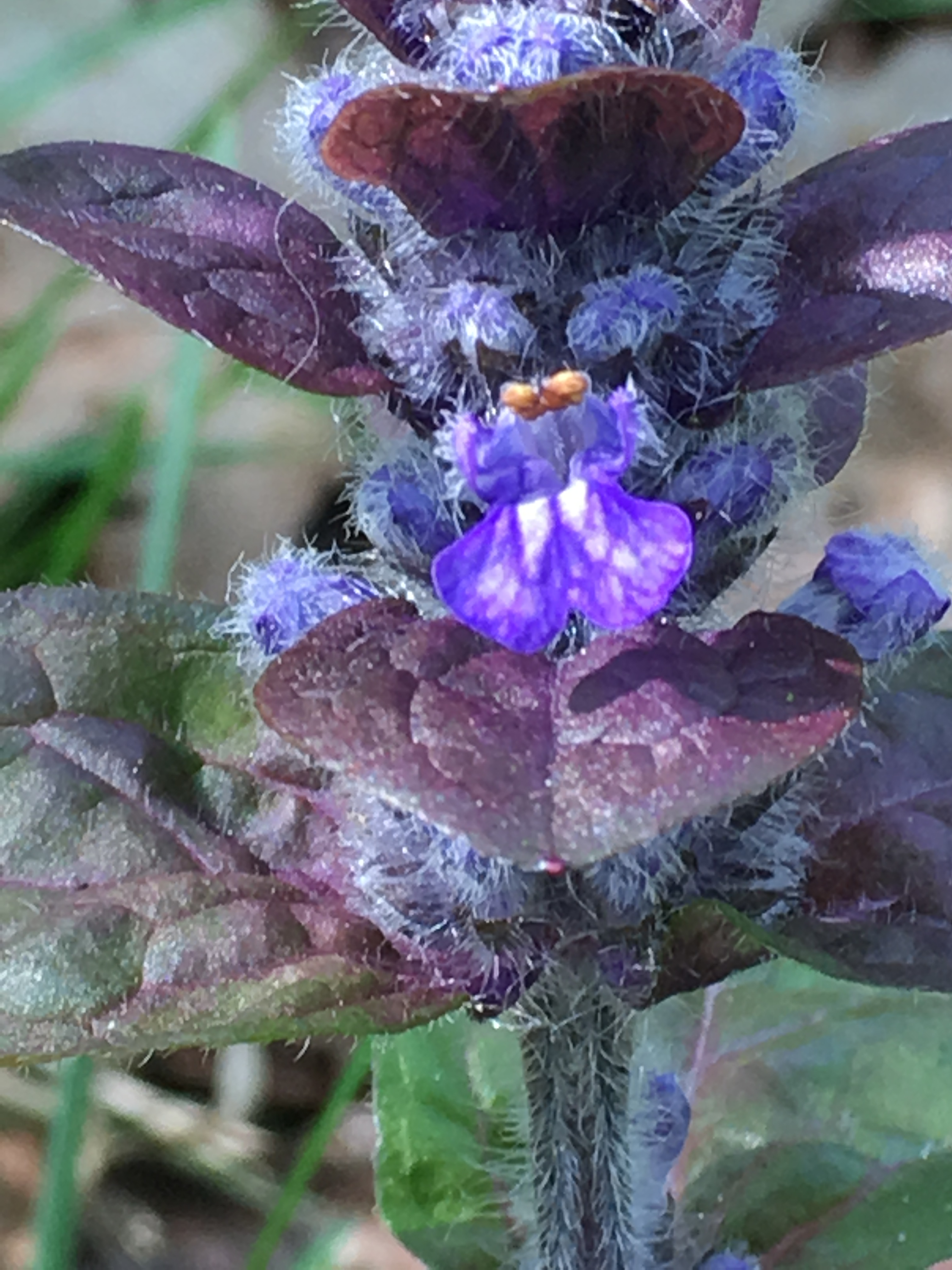
Ajuga reptans in Gosling Corner in 2018

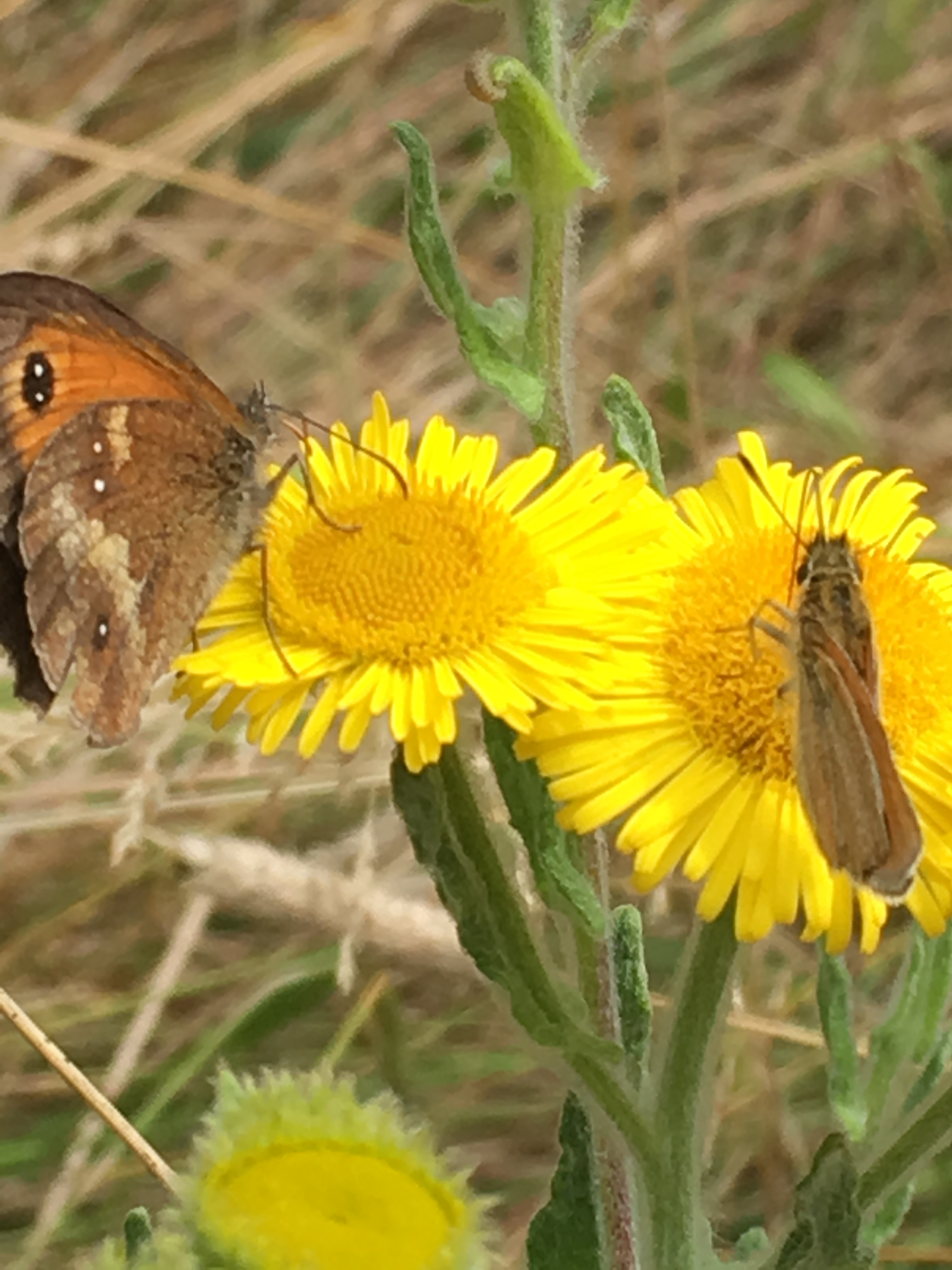
Pulicaria dysenterica with two species of butterfly, in Gosling Corner in 2018

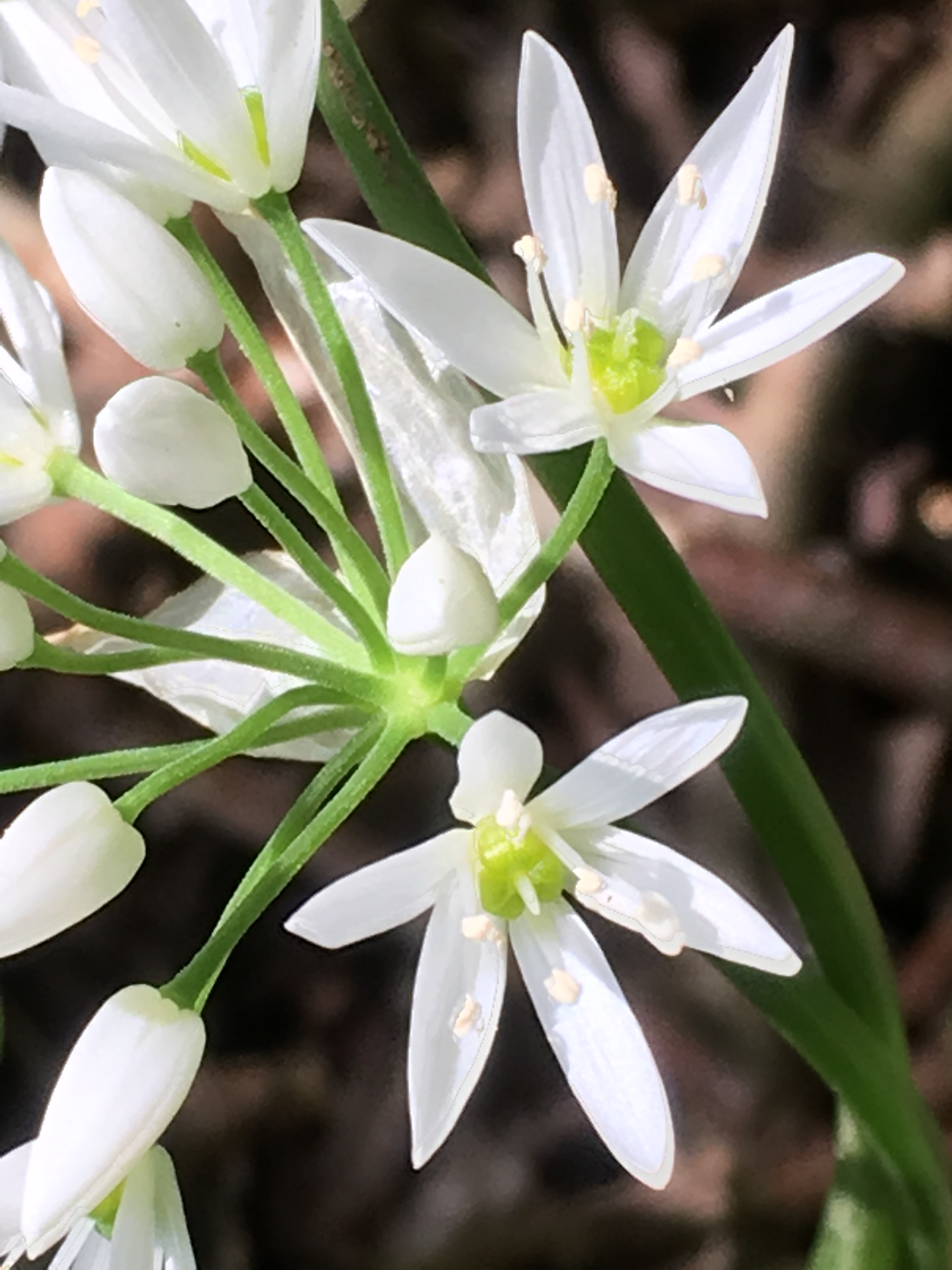
Allium ursinum in Gosling Corner in 2018

== See also ==
- Southrey Wood
