= Apley =

Hamlet and civil parish in the West Lindsey district of Lincolnshire, England

Coordinates: 53.260914°N 0.336684°W

- Location within Lincolnshire
- OS grid reference: TF110750
  - London: 120 mi (190 km) S
- District: West Lindsey
- Shire county: Lincolnshire
- Region: East Midlands
- Country: England
- Sovereign state: United Kingdom
- Post town: Market Rasen
- Postcode district: LN8
- Dialling code: 01673
- Police: Lincolnshire
- Fire: Lincolnshire
- Ambulance: East Midlands
- UK Parliament: Gainsborough

Apley is a hamlet and civil parish in the West Lindsey district of Lincolnshire, England. It is situated 1 mile (1.6 km) west from the hamlet of Kingthorpe and the site of Kingthorpe railway station, and approximately 2 miles (3 km) south-west from Wragby. The parish includes the hamlets of New Apley, Hop Lane, and Kingthorpe.

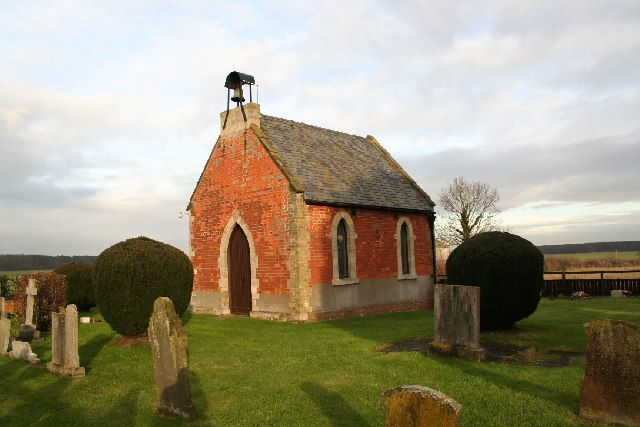
St Andrew's Church, Apley

Apley church, dedicated to St Andrew, is a small brick building erected in 1871 at a cost of £284. It was built to conduct burial services within the graveyard of the former and by then non-existing medieval Church of St Andrew's, which before 1816 had decayed and been reduced to its foundations. In the 19th century the churchyard also served the parish of Stainfield. Apley is recorded in White's Directory as a village and parish with a population of 231, and a land area of 1,658 acres (6.7 km^{2}), 300 acres (1.2 km^{2}) of which was woodland, and included the hamlets of Kingthorpe and Hop Lane. Apley professions and trades listed in 1872 included a parish clerk, a boot & shoemaker, six farmers, two of whom were at Kingthorpe, and two carriers, one of whom was a shopkeeper.

Apley Beck marks the course of a 12th-century monastic canal linking Bullington Priory to Barlings eau.
