= South Willingham and Hainton railway station =

Disused railway station in Lincolnshire, England

South Willingham and Hainton
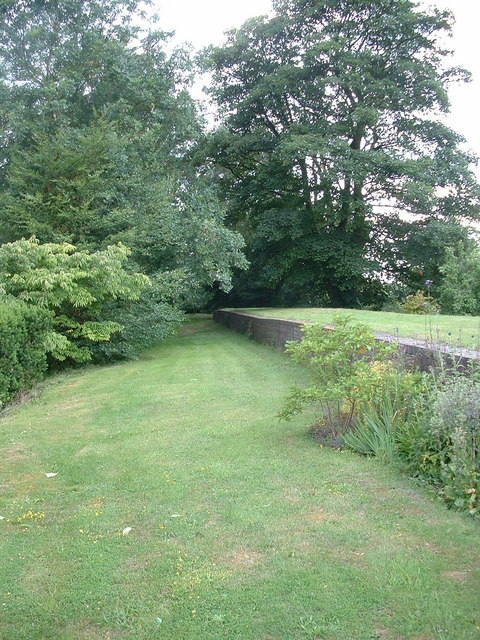
- Former trackbed and platform

General information
- Location: South Willingham, East Lindsey; England
- Coordinates: 53.3297°N 0.2064°W
- Grid reference: TF196828
- Platforms: 1

Other information
- Status: Disused

History
- Original company: Louth and Lincoln Railway
- Pre-grouping: Great Northern Railway
- Post-grouping: London and North Eastern Railway

Key dates
- 9 November 1874: Opened (goods)
- 1 December 1876: Station opened to passengers as South Willingham
- 1 January 1877: Renamed South Willingham and Hainton
- 5 November 1951: closed (passenger)
- 1 December 1958: closed to all traffic
Location

South Willingham and Hainton railway station was a railway station that served the village of South Willingham, Lincolnshire, England between 1874 and 1958, on the Louth to Bardney line.

== History ==
The Louth and Lincoln Railway planned and built a branch line from Bardney to Louth in stages, the first stage between Bardney and South Willingham opened to goods traffic on 9 November 1874. South Willingham acted as a terminus until South Willingham Tunnel was completed. The line then opened to Donington on Bain on 27 September 1875, still goods traffic only.

The line was completed through to Louth for goods traffic on 6 August 1876 and opened to passengers on 1 December 1876. One month later, on 1 January 1877, South Willingham station was renamed South Willingham and Hainton. However, the station nameboard read Hainton and South Willingham, probably to save having to replace an otherwise new board. It was absorbed by the Great Northern Railway in 1882.

The station was located 139 miles 63 chains from London Kings Cross via Spalding, Boston and Bardney. The branch was mostly single track and the station had only one platform. A signal box was located at South Willingham, to control the block and the small goods yard. The yard had two sidings serving an end loading dock and cattle pen. There was no loop at South Willingham to allow trains to pass one another but connections to the sidings allowed the train's engine to run round a few wagons. At the road entrance to the goods yard was a weighbridge and office. The platform was increased in height over half its length sometime between 1930 and 1950.

The station building included living accommodation for the Station Master and his family as well as telegraph facilities, a booking office, a general waiting room and a ladies waiting room. Architecturally, the building was in the same style as others on the line; built of brick with a number of brick string courses of a contrasting colour. The number and appearance of the string courses differed on each station; at South Willingham, the general bricks were a lighter colour with darker string course bricks.

The signal box was of timber construction and was constructed on a brick plinth set into the side of the embankment opposite the eastern end of the platform.

=== Passenger service ===
When the line opened five passenger trains a day were provided, but this was quickly reduced to 4, with 5 on Fridays. At the start of the Second World War the service was suspended for three months. When it was reinstated in December 1939 the timetable was reduced to three trains in each direction and the 1950 timetable shows that this arrangement continued after the war until closure. Although originally intended to run to Lincoln, trains on the line only ran between Louth and Bardney; passengers had to change at Bardney to get to Lincoln. Trains were timetabled to get to Wragby in 11 minutes, and Bardney in 22 minutes, with a connection to Lincoln taking a further 25 minutes. In the other direction, trains took 8 minutes to get to Donington and 24 minutes to arrive in Louth (these are sample times and varied during the day and in the direction travelled).

Passenger services ended on 5 November 1951, goods traffic on 1 December 1958.

=== After Closure ===
The track was lifted in 1961 and the bridge over the road was demolished sometime during the following 12 years. The signal box had been demolished sometime between 1953 and 1958, whilst goods traffic still used the line. The station building became a private residence and has since been rendered and extensively extended. A large brick and asbestos cement industrial shed was built in the goods yard in the 1960s, which was subsequently used to build Piper sports cars. The platform and end loading dock remains (in 2020) as does the weighbridge office.

=== Station Masters ===
The following Station Masters are recorded along with the date of the record. They lived in the station building, along with their families.

- 1875 James Andrews
- 1881 & 1891 Charles Smith
- 1901 & 1911 Alfred Coulson
- 1926 John Edward Paul
- 1939 James Moseley

Whilst James Moseley is recorded as living with his wife and family in the station building in 1939, he is not a station master; he is described in the 1939 Census as a porter and a signalman.

== Route ==
Preceding station	Disused railways	Following station
East Barkwith; Line and station closed	Great Northern Railway; Louth to Bardney line	Donington on Bain; Line and station closed
