= Wragby =

Town and civil parish in Lincolnshire, England

Coordinates: 53.287282°N 0.302601°W

- Town and civil parish
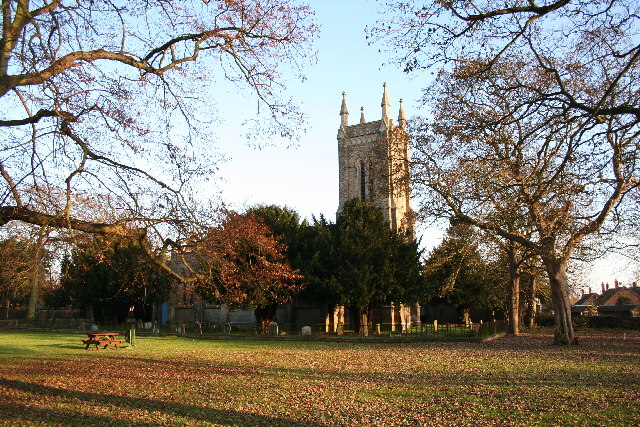
- All Saints Church, Wragby

- Location within Lincolnshire
- Population: 1,861 (2021)
- OS grid reference: TF132780
  - London: 125 mi (201 km) S
- Civil parish: Wragby
- District: East Lindsey
- Shire county: Lincolnshire
- Region: East Midlands
- Country: England
- Sovereign state: United Kingdom
- Post town: Market Rasen
- Postcode district: LN8
- Dialling code: 01673
- Police: Lincolnshire
- Fire: Lincolnshire
- Ambulance: East Midlands
- UK Parliament: Louth and Horncastle

Wragby (/ˈræɡbi/ RAG-bee) is a historic market town and civil parish in the East Lindsey district of Lincolnshire, England. It is situated at the junction of the A157 and A158 roads, and approximately 10 miles (16 km) north-west from Horncastle and about 11 miles (18 km) north-east of Lincoln.

== History ==
The name Wragby derives from the Old Norse wraggibȳ meaning 'Wraggi's village'.

Wragby is named in the Domesday Book as "Waragebi", when it consisted of 23 households, a mill and a church.

The 'Rout Yard', a scheduled monument in the form of two moated islands and associated ditched enclosures, is the remains of a medieval manorial complex. In 1086 there were two manors at Wragby, one in the possession of Erenis of Buron, the other, Waldin the Artificer. The surviving remains possibly represent the Buron manor which held responsibility for a church. The church was dismantled in 1836 when a new church was established closer to the modern village centre. The 18th century brick-built chancel was kept as a cemetery chapel until the 1980s when it too was demolished.

The ruins of the older church can be seen from the bottom of the cemetery, and are 440 yards (400 m) from the grade II listed All Saints Church which was built in 1839 by W. A. Nicholson. The ruins of the old church are no longer in evidence, but the local history group has marked out the site of the old church and erected information boards. Some artefacts from the old church can be seen in the present day All Saints' Church. The site of the old church and the associated churchyard have been cleared by members of the Wragby Heritage Group, with financial help from the Heritage Lottery Fund. The site of the old church has been marked out, information boards erected and several damaged tombs and headstones repaired. Work is being carried out in order to map out the position and occupants of the gravesites.

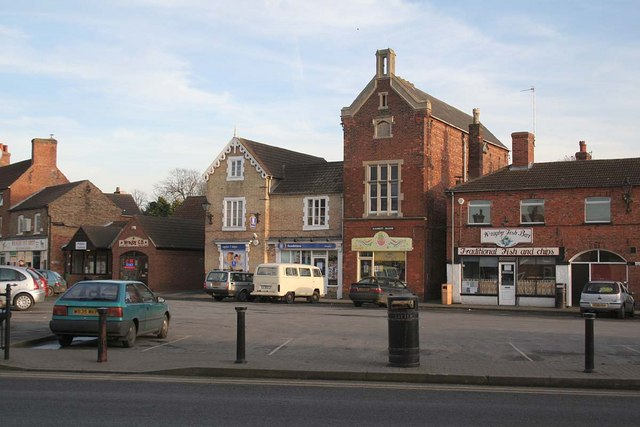
Market Place, Wragby

Wragby was a market town and staging centre through a charter dating back to Charles II and requested by the Duke of Buckingham, for one market and two fairs. The market was held on a Thursday, and there was a fair held on 1 May, and 28–29 September. Eggs and butter were still being sold at the market during the early part of the 20th century and the cattle market was still functioning until some time after the Second World War. The market place is now mostly used for car parking and occasional market events. The nearby Adam and Eve Pub mostly holds the markets of Wragby on its car park.

A grammar school founded in 1635, and rebuilt in 1775 are both now in residential use. There was also a Grade II listed windmill, built in 1831. It was powered by six sails until 1903 when it ceased working. The 1887 OS Map shows a second windmill off Victoria Street; however, it has gone in the 1906 map.

The Brady touring company of actors performed here in a temporary theatre in October 1818 before moving on to Bardney.

In 1883 the last European wildcat in England was killed at Bullington Wood, near Wragby.

Over time Wragby has evolved to be a stopping point en route to the coastal town of Skegness, with amenities including three public houses, a fish shop, café and a supermarket. The population of Wragby has expanded though the building of two new housing estates; a third estate began development in late 2009, with completion expected by early 2012. Kier Group initially began the new construction projects after buying-out local homebuilder Hugh Bourn. However, Kier then themselves sold the land and properties to Linden Homes (themselves a subsidiary of Galliford Try), who have continued construction of sites in the town, such as Carpenters Lodge.

The Sinking Ships, a band formed in 1979 known for singing the previously mysterious song 'Strangers', originated from Wragby.

== Demographics ==
At the 2021 census, Wragby's built up area had a population of 1,861. Of the findings, the ethnicity and religious composition of the ward was:

Wragby: Ethnicity: 2021 Census
Ethnic group	Population	%
White	1,805	97.1%
Mixed	29	1.6%
Asian or Asian British	24	1.3%
Other Ethnic Group	1	0.1%
Total	1,861	100%

The religious composition of the ward at the 2021 Census was recorded as:

Wragby: Religion: 2021 Census
Religious	Population	%
Christian	1,029	58.9%
Irreligious	687	39.3%
Muslim	10	0.6%
Other religion	7	0.4%
Buddhist	4	0.2%
Hindu	4	0.2%
Sikh	4	0.2%
Jewish	2	0.1%
Total	1,861	100%

== Railway ==
A station was opened in the town on the Louth to Bardney Line. The station was located on Horncastle Road near the present day Station Mews housing estate. The station was to the east of the town. The station opened in 1874 and closed to passengers in 1951, only to close fully in 1960 to goods traffic. The line has been built over by houses and road alignments, although the station and platform remain as a private residence. There were also stations in the nearby villages of East Barkwith and Kingsthorpe.

== Governance ==
An electoral ward of the same name exists. This ward stretches east with a total population taken at the 2011 Census of 2,469.

Wragby is a civil parish and has a parish council, the lowest tier of local government. The parish includes several outlying farms and houses but no other substantial settlements.

== Conservation area and listed buildings ==
The town centre is designated as a conservation area.

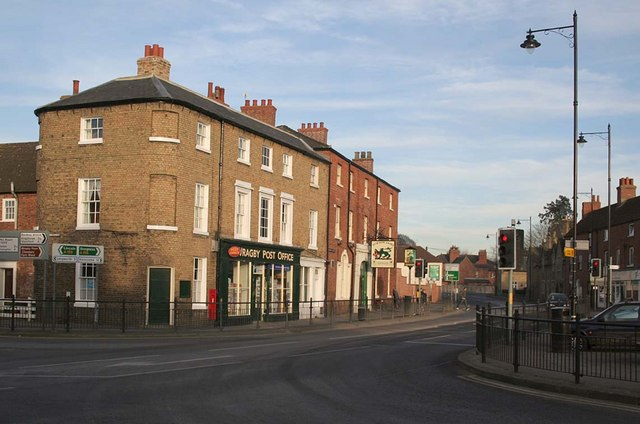
Wragby Post Office and Turnor Arms Hotel, both Grade II listed buildings

The Market Place and its surrounding streets have a number of historic structures that have been given listed building status. All are listed by Historic England at Grade II.

As of January 2025 there are 13 listed buildings in the parish of Wragby, all at grade II. The "Moated manorial complex and church site 230m south east of All Saints' Church" is a scheduled monument.

Listed buildings in Wragby parish
Name	Photograph	Date (earliest)	Notes	Grade
Beech House, Silver Street, TF1361478073		17thC		II
The Old Grammar School, Louth Road, TF1335678155		Late 18thC		II
Red Lion Cottage, Market Place, TF 13196 78018		Late 18thC	Former farmhouse.	II
The Hollies, Silver Street, TF 13564 78034		Late 18thC	Former rectory.	II
The Manor House, Bardney Road, TF1319977931		Late 18thC		II
Wrangham House, Main Street, TF1328478030		Late 18thC		II
Turnor Arms Hotel, Main Street, TF 13250 78045		early 19thC		II
Windmill, Bardney Road, TF 13130 77784		1831		II
Church of All Saints, Church Street, TF 13457 77972		1839		II
Handpump at almshouses, Main Street, TF1332378038		1840		II
Almshouses 1–10 and wall with gateway, Main Street, TF1332878026		1840	Almshouses.	II
Surgery Cottage, Main Street, TF1329678035		1840		II
Former Post Office, Main Street, TF 13232 78040		c. 1840		II
