= The Sinking Ships =

English post-punk band

- Origin: Wragby, Lincolnshire, U.K.
- Genres: Post-punk
- Years active: 1979–1981, 1987, 1998, 2018–present (online only)
- Label: Recession
- Past members: Simon Brighton; Terry Welbourn; Nick Green; Colin Hopkirk (1979–1980); Tracey Horseman (1980); Charlie Anderson (1980–1981)

The Sinking Ships (sometimes referred to as Sinking Ships) was an English post-punk band formed in 1979.

== History ==
The Sinking Ships was formed in the autumn of 1979 by former Berlin and Stress members Simon Brighton, Terry Welbourn, Colin Hopkirk, and Nick Green in Wragby, Lincolnshire, United Kingdom.

The band recorded two tracks for the local New Wave compilation Household Shocks in 1980; Hopkirk left the band after its release. In the Spring of 1980, it recorded the single The Cinema Clock b/w Strangers. After that, the band's members increased from three to six. In 1981, the band's members again decreased to three, and they released their single Dream b/w After the Rain - Live in April 1981 on the Recession label. After that, the band's members split up.

The group reformed briefly in 1987 and 1998 to play a handful of shows.

In 2018, they released a live EP from 1980 entitled Playground Studios, Wragby, 1980. It was available on their Bandcamp page for a short period before being removed. The EP was later re-released on their page as the Smiles and Guns EP in 2021.

In 2021, the band released a compilation album on their Bandcamp entitled The Cinema Clock ...And Other Stories, featuring a number of their songs from their short career together.

In February 2022, the Post Sinking Ships Demos 1981 compilation was released. The songs were recorded during the winter of 1981 to 1982, shortly after the band had originally disbanded. In May 2022, they released Sinking Ships Live! – 1981, a compilation album containing live recordings of the band's performances at Carre's Grammar School and the Lincoln College of Art. Later on, in June 2022, the band released the "Over the Edge"/"History" single, featuring two songs they had recorded in 1987 after a brief reunion. The two songs are different from the rest of their discography in that they are more pop-oriented, in contrast to their usual post-punk style of music. and terry walboun and simon brigton Nick Green have been making music again at 2024 as the shining guest with Colin moss(7)

== Legacy ==
The group would see a sizable uptick in interest and popularity in 2019, when their song "Strangers" was featured on Societas X Tape, a mixtape produced by the band Boards of Canada for the radio station NTS Radio. At the time of broadcast, the Sinking Ships' identity was unknown to most people, especially those listening to the broadcast, and thus the song would gain attention from the lostwave community. One theory suggested that the band who made it also made "The Most Mysterious Song on the Internet", itself later identified as "Subways of Your Mind" by Fex, because of the singer's voice and the mystery around the two songs. Following the identification of "Strangers", Simon Brighton was contacted, and confirmed that they had no involvement with "Subways".

== Members ==
- Simon Brighton – vocals
- Terry Welbourn – bass
- Nick Green – drums
- Colin Hopkirk – vocals (1979–1980)
- Tracey Horseman – keyboard (1980)
- Charlie Anderson – saxophone (1980–1981)

== Discography ==
=== Albums ===
- Sinking Ships Live! – 1981 (2022)

=== EPs ===
- Playground Studios, Wragby, 1980. (2018, reissued as Smiles and Guns)

=== Singles ===
- "The Cinema Clock" b/w "Strangers" (1980, Dead Good Records/Stark Products)
- "Dream" b/w "After the Rain (Live)" (1981, Recession Records)
- "Over the Edge"/"History" (2022, recorded in 1987)

=== Compilations ===
- The Cinema Clock ...And Other Stories (2021)
- Post Sinking Ships Demos 1981 (2022)

=== Appearances ===
- "Weight Loss" and "Third World" on Household Shocks (1980, Stark Products)
- "Strangers" on Boards of Canada's Societas X Tape (2019, Warp)
