= Hallington =

Village in Lincolnshire, England

Coordinates: 53.351422°N 0.042562°W

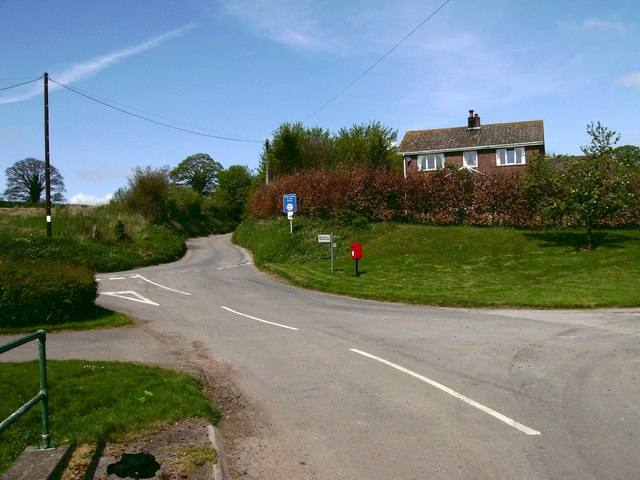
- Hallington crossroads

- Location within Lincolnshire
- Population: 42 (2021 census)
- OS grid reference: TF303856
  - London: 125 mi (201 km) S
- District: East Lindsey
- Shire county: Lincolnshire
- Region: East Midlands
- Country: England
- Sovereign state: United Kingdom
- Post town: Louth
- Postcode district: LN11
- Police: Lincolnshire
- Fire: Lincolnshire
- Ambulance: East Midlands
- UK Parliament: Louth and Horncastle

Hallington is a small village and civil parish in the East Lindsey district of Lincolnshire, England. It is situated 2 miles (3 km) south-west from the town of Louth in the Lincolnshire Wolds, a designated Area of Outstanding Natural Beauty. In 2021 the parish had a population of 42.

Hallington is listed in the 1086 Domesday Book as "Halintun", with 25 households, 10 acres of meadow, and assigned to Earl Hugh of Chester.

The village is probably the site of a medieval settlement, indicated by aerial observations showing earthwork evidence of ridge and furrow fields, crofts, buildings and sunken lanes.

The parish church, which was dedicated to Saint Lawrence, no longer exists. Three isolated graves are all that remain of church and burial ground.

Hallington railway station was sited in the village; it opened in 1876 and closed in 1956. The main building still exists and is now a private residence.

Off Station Road is Home Farm House, a Grade II listed farmhouse c.1800.
