= Donington on Bain railway station =

Former railway station in Lincolnshire, England

Donington
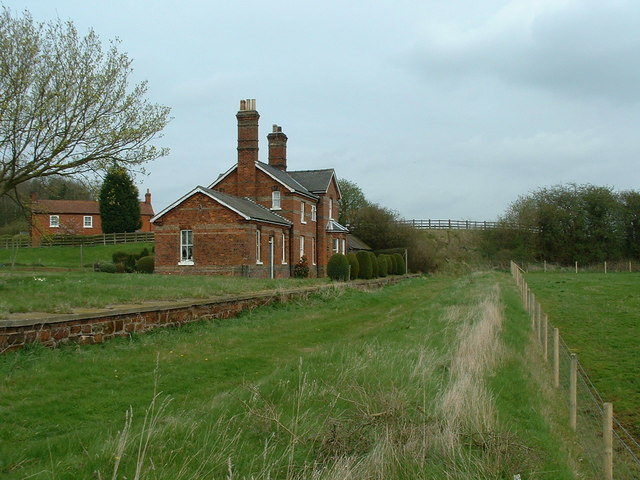
- Donington railway station in 2004

General information
- Location: Donington on Bain, Lincolnshire; England
- Coordinates: 53.31795°N 0.13654°W
- Grid reference: TF241817
- Platforms: 1

Other information
- Status: Disused

History
- Original company: Louth and Lincoln Railway
- Pre-grouping: Great Northern Railway
- Post-grouping: London and North Eastern Railway

Key dates
- 1 Dec 1876: Opened as Donnington-on-Bain
- 1 Jan 1877: Renamed Donington-on-Bain
- 5 Nov 1951: closed (passenger)
- 1 Dec 1958: closed (goods)
Location

Donington railway station was a station in the village of Donington on Bain, Lincolnshire, England.

== History ==
The Great Northern Railway planned and built a branch line from Bardney to Louth in stages, the middle stage between Wragby and Donington-on-Bain opening for freight on 27 September 1875.

Passenger services ended on 5 November 1951, goods traffic on 1 December 1958.

== Route ==
Preceding station	Disused railways	Following station
South Willingham and Hainton; Line and station closed	Great Northern Railway; Louth to Bardney line	Withcall; Line and station closed
