= Louth to Bardney Line =

Railway line in Lincolnshire, England

Coordinates: 53.3180°N 0.1365°W

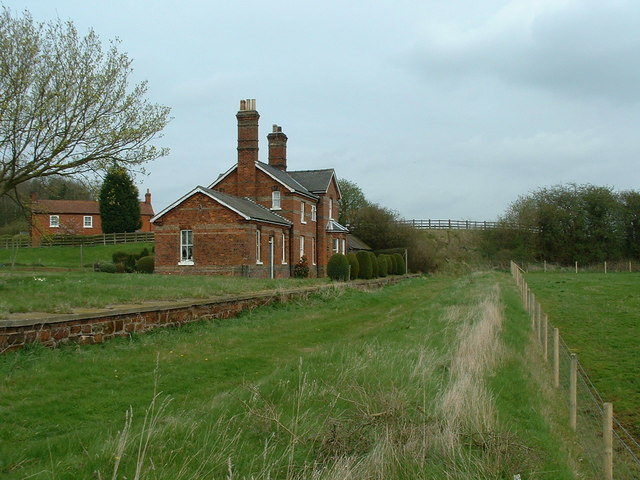
Louth to Bardney Line

The Louth to Bardney Line was an English railway line built by the Louth and Lincoln Railway Company, in Lincolnshire, England. It opened in stages between 1874 and 1876, after serious difficulties in raising subscription capital, and following alteration to the planned route. It was hoped to serve large reserves of ironstone along its route, but the deposits were not as large as hoped, and the line was never financially successful.

The passenger service closed in 1951, and the residual goods service closed in stages from 1956 to 1960.

== Conception ==
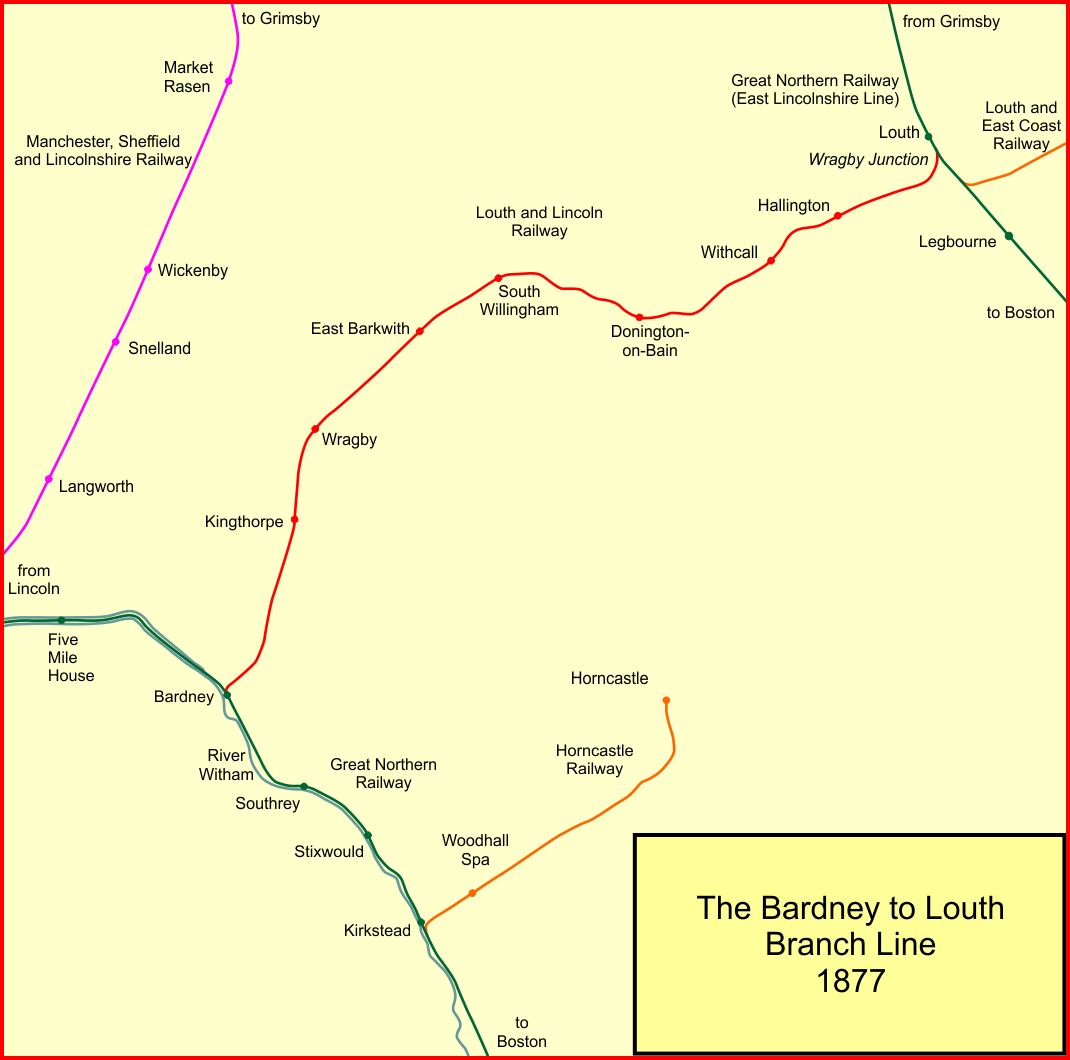
The line in 1877

By 1866 the two main lines of the Great Northern Railway in Lincolnshire were well established: the original "Lincolnshire Loop" line via Lincoln, and the East Lincolnshire Line. The latter had been authorised by Parliament to the East Lincolnshire Railway Company, but immediately leased to the GNR, which constructed it and operated it.

Louth and Lincoln Railway Act 1866
- Act of Parliament
- Parliament of the United Kingdom
- Long title: An Act for making a Railway in Lincolnshire from Louth to the Five Mite House Station of the Great Northern Railway (Loop Line); to be called "The Louth and Lincoln Railway."
- Citation: 29 & 30 Vict. c. cccxliv

Dates
- Royal assent: 6 August 1866

In the 1860s thought was given to building a line from Louth to Lincoln and beyond, giving Grimsby a direct route to Lincoln; however the rival Manchester, Sheffield and Lincolnshire Railway already provided such a route, via Market Rasen. Nevertheless, the Louth and Lincoln Railway was authorised by the Louth and Lincoln Railway Act 1866 (29 & 30 Vict. c. cccxliv) on 6 August 1866; authorised share capital was £250,000. The line was to join the Boston to Lincoln line near Five Mile House, that distance from Lincoln. Huge reserves of ironstone were believed to exist at Apley and Donington on Bain, on the line of route.

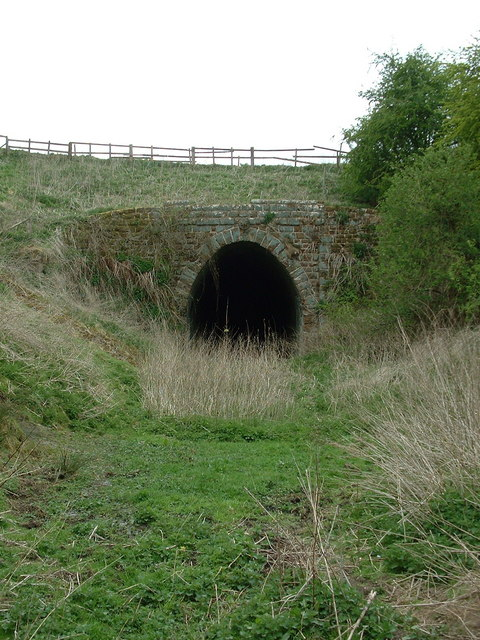
The eastern entrance to South Willingham tunnel

The company was in financial difficulties from the start, with problems over land acquisition, and shortage of subscriptions. Already in April 1867 the Directors applied to the Board of Trade to abandon the project, saying that problems with land purchase, and the junction at Five Mile House, were insuperable. The Board of Trade refused the application.

Louth and Lincoln Railway Act 1872
- Act of Parliament
- Parliament of the United Kingdom
- Long title: An Act to enable the Louth and Lincoln Railway Company to abandon the construction of a portion of their Railway and make a Deviation or Substituted Line of Railway in lieu thereof; to revive the powers conferred upon the said Company by The Louth and Lincoln Railway Act, 1866; and for other purposes.
- Citation: 35 & 36 Vict. c. cxvii

Dates
- Royal assent: 18 July 1872

Frederick Appleby, a Manchester civil engineer, acquired the company and altered the design, arranging for the branch to join the loop line at Bardney instead, and with the access reversed so that trains ran into a bay and would have to reverse to join the loop line. This was authorised by the Louth and Lincoln Railway Act 1872 (35 & 36 Vict. c. cxvii).

== Construction ==
The Great Northern Railway agreed to work the line, but the GNR directors were not willing to commit their own resources to the project, and they refused direct financial aid. So sceptical were they that they insisted on payment in cash or securities for the cost of installation of the junctions.

The line was engineered by T Myers; it was single track, laid with 72 lb rails. There were two tunnels, South Willingham (557 yd) between South Willingham and Donington and Withcall (971 yd) between Donington and Hallington. South Willingham tunnel is also known as Benniworth Tunnel or High Street Tunnel, however GEOGIS, the British Rail track and structures database calls it South Willingham Tunnel. The area of the Lincolnshire Wolds through which the line passed was hilly, and severe gradients were unavoidable. Further capital was needed as the original estimate proved to be inadequate.

Construction began at the Louth end in January 1872. The work was delayed by bad weather; in addition there was a strike by the bricklayers in the tunnels.

== Opening and operation ==
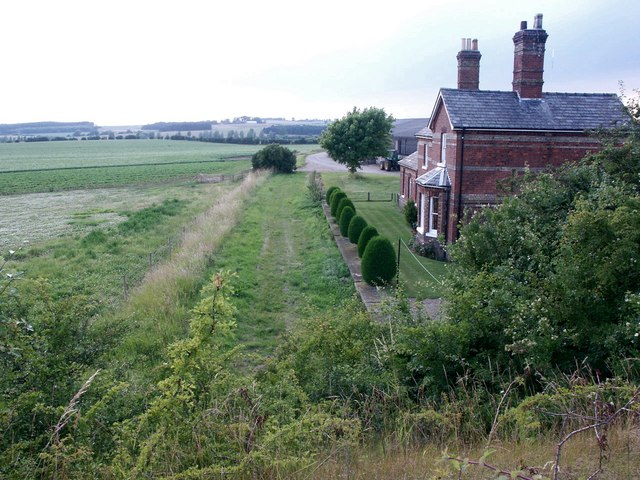
Former railway station at Donington on Bain

Goods traffic was started between Bardney and South Willingham on 9 November 1874, and it was extended to Donington on 27 September 1875. The entire line was opened throughout to Louth (Wragby Junction) on 26 June 1876 for goods, and on 1 December for passengers. Captain Tyler of the Board of Trade had inspected it on 31 October but, owing to the incomplete state of works, withheld approval for passenger operation. The issue was the lack of turntables at the ends of the line. He made a second visit on 27 November, then approving it.

Stations were at Kingthorpe, Wragby, East Barkwith, South Willingham and Hainton, Donnington on Bain (later Donington on Bain), Withcall (in 1882) and Hallington. The original service was five trains each way on weekdays only, reduced to four on 1 January 1877. First services ran through to Lincoln, but this too was abandoned, and the branch passenger trains worked from Louth to Bardney.

Although some ironstone was extracted locally, the promised huge income from carrying it was lacking. Receipts were poor; eventually, a receiver was appointed and efforts were soon made to sell the undertaking to the GNR. The GNR were not enthusiastic, but in December 1881 they agreed to purchase the line for £200,000. About £380,000 had been expended on building the line. The transfer was authorised by the Great Northern Railway Act 1882 (45 & 46 Vict. c. cxci) of 10 August 1882 and the company passed into GNR ownership on 30 June 1883. Ideas of altering the junction at Bardney to face Lincoln were put forward in 1882, but it was not put into effect.

The GNR changed the signage on the line to reflect their own policies. For instance, the cast iron trespass notices were replaced with GNR versions. They also installed their own mile posts, used to reference any part of the line, but in doing so they changed the origin of the lines mileage. The 1888 OS Map shows that the chainage started at Louth, but subsequent maps show the mile posts in different locations with GEOGIS recording that zero miles was a Kings Cross, routed via Spalding, Boston and Bardney.

== Second World War ==
During World War II many bomber airfields were established in Lincolnshire; in January 1943 a Maintenance Unit, No 233, was formed in the area to store and supply bombs and other equipment. It was given the name of Market Stainton, but in fact comprised some sixty miles of roadside grass verges. The stations used to supply this were Donington on Bain, Withcall and Hallington. It was closed in 1948.

Passenger operation was suspended between 11 September 1939 and 4 December 1939.

== Closure ==
The line closed on 5 November 1951 so far as passengers were concerned. Goods traffic was cut back in stages: Louth to Donington on 15 September 1956; Donington to Wragby 1 December 1958; and Wragby to Bardney on 1 February 1960.

== Station list ==
The passenger service was suspended from 11 November 1939, reopening on 5 December 1939.

- Bardney; Great Northern Railway main line station;
- Kingthorpe; opened 1 December 1876; closed 5 November 1951;
- Wragby; opened; opened 1 December 1876; closed 5 November 1951;
- East Barkwith; opened 1 December 1876; closed 5 November 1951;
- South Willingham; opened 1 December 1876; renamed South Willingham & Hainton 1877; closed 5 November 1951;
- Donnington on Bain; opened 1 December 1876; renamed Donington-on-Bain 1876; closed 5 November 1951;
- Withcall; opened 1 August 1882; closed 5 November 1951;
- Hallington; opened 1 December 1876; closed 5 November 1951;
- Wragby Junction;
- Louth; main line station.

== See also ==
- Lincolnshire lines of the Great Northern Railway
