= Louth railway station =

Former railway station in Lincolnshire, England

Louth
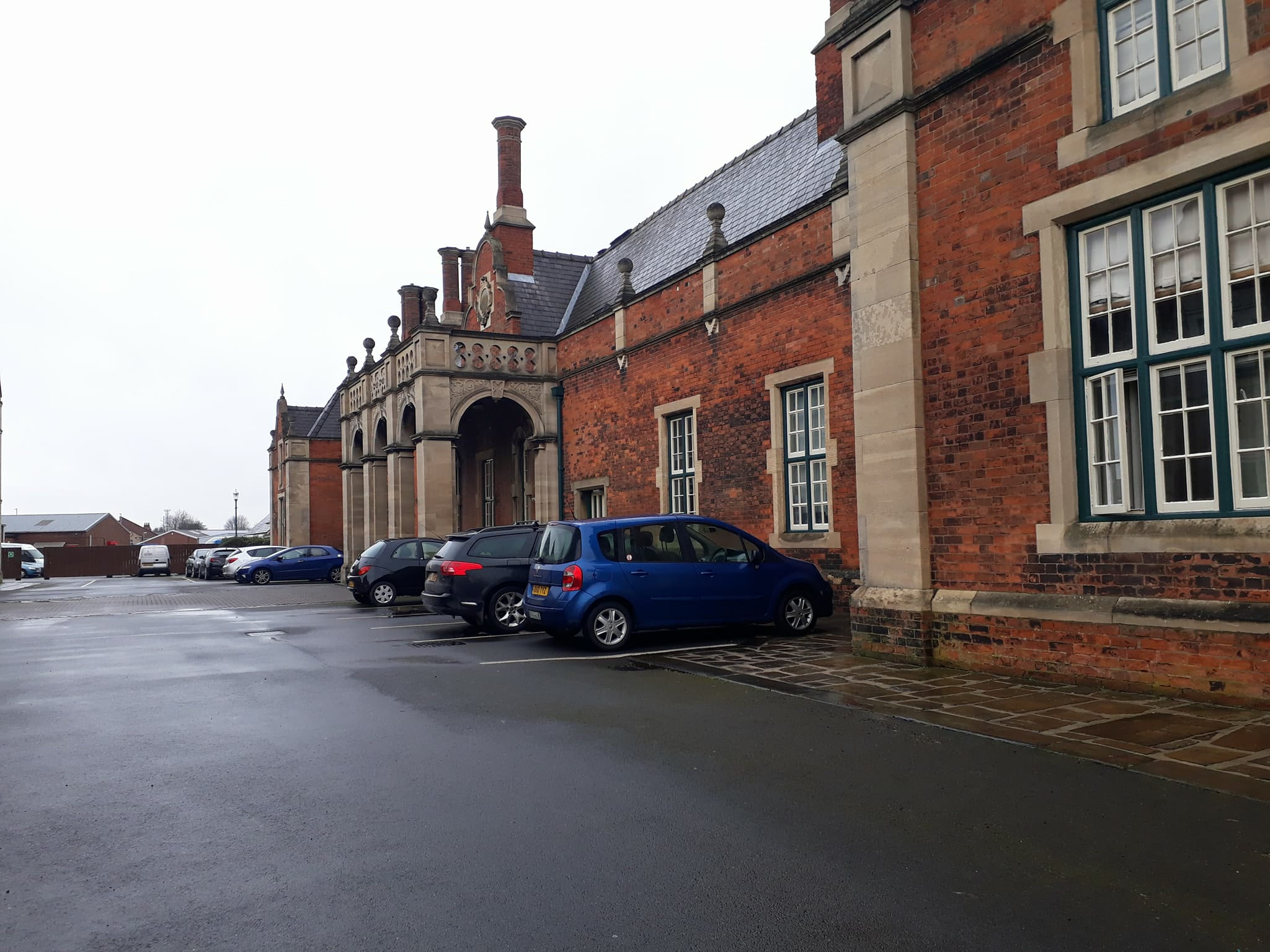
- Louth station frontage

General information
- Location: Louth, Lincolnshire; England
- Coordinates: 53.3714°N 0.00157°E
- Grid reference: TF333879
- Platforms: 3

Other information
- Status: Disused

History
- Original company: East Lincolnshire Railway
- Pre-grouping: Great Northern Railway
- Post-grouping: LNER

Key dates
- 1 March 1848: Opened
- 5 Oct 1970: Closed to regular passenger traffic
- 22 Dec 1980: Closed

Listed Building – Grade II
- Feature: Louth Railway station
- Designated: 18 February 1974
- Reference no.: 1063202
Location

Louth railway station was a station in Louth, Lincolnshire, England. It served as a junction for several different now closed lines which converged on the town.

The closure of the station has left Louth which has over 16,000 residents the largest town in Lincolnshire without a railway station.

== History ==
The foundation stone of Louth railway station was formally laid on 8 July 1847 by Miss Charlotte Alington Pye, a popular ballad writer of the time (who used the pseudonym "Claribel" from a Tennyson poem). The architects of the station buildings were John Grey Weightman and Matthew Ellison Hadfield of Sheffield.

The station was damaged by bombing on 19 February 1941 killing a local man, George Bradley, who was the fireman of an engine shunting in the goods yard.

Louth Station was closed to passengers in 1970. The line northwards to Grimsby remained open for freight until 1980. A 5-car diesel multiple unit formed a special into Louth on 20 December 1980; at the time, the only remaining track was into the bay platform No. 1. The station building was saved from demolition and converted into flats. It is a Grade II listed building.

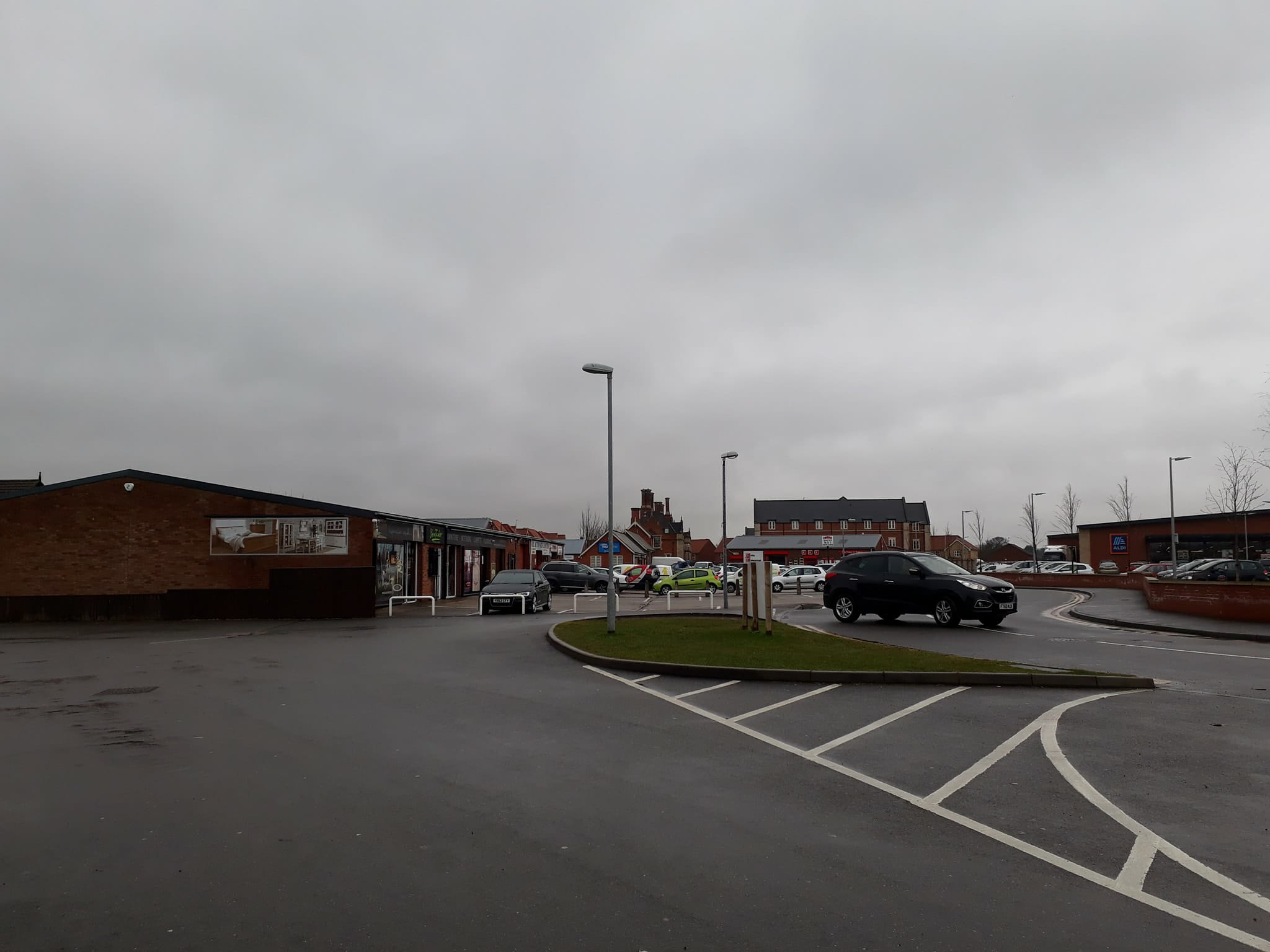
Site of Louth station, goods yard and the former Kilns

=== Preservation future ===
The Lincolnshire Wolds Railway plans to eventually extend their running line to Louth, however the original station building and the surrounding area cannot be reused as the terminus of the LWR, as it has been converted for residential use, and the former goods yard is now a mix of housing and industrial/retail outlets.

A proposed new station will be built approx. 3/4 mile to the north of the original station. Louth North signalbox still stands in its original position by the adjacent level crossing. This has now been converted to a house.

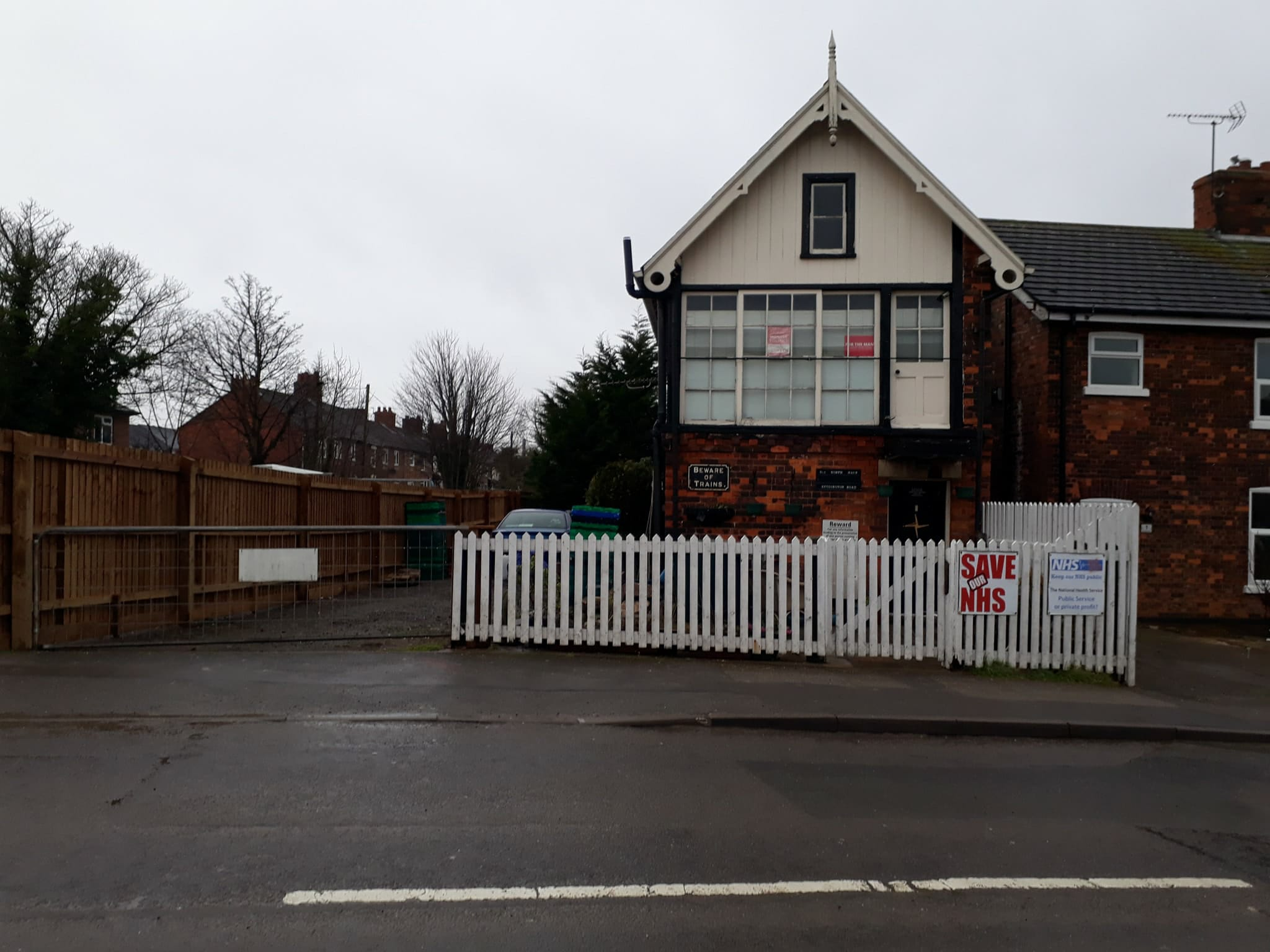
The preserved Louth North signal box, now a private residence

== Route ==
Preceding station	Disused railways	Following station
Fotherby Halt	Great Northern Railway; East Lincolnshire Line	Legbourne Road
Terminus	Great Northern Railway; Mablethorpe loop railway	Grimoldby
Hallington	Great Northern Railway; Louth to Bardney Line	Terminus
