= Bardney railway station =

Former railway station in Lincolnshire, England

Bardney
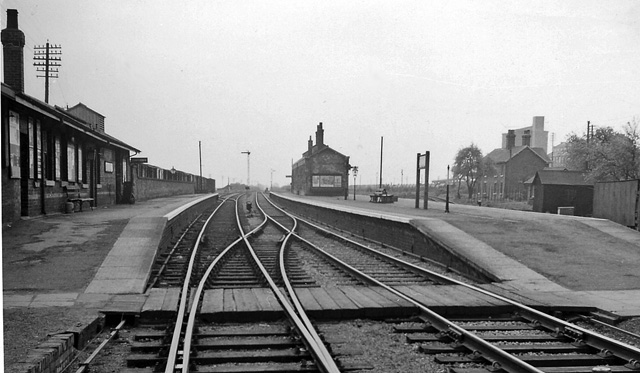
- The station in 1961

General information
- Location: Bardney, Lincolnshire; England
- Coordinates: 53.20656°N 0.33448°W
- Grid reference: TF113690
- Platforms: 3

Other information
- Status: Disused

History
- Original company: Great Northern Railway
- Post-grouping: LNER

Key dates
- 17 October 1848: opened as Bardney and Wragby
- May 1881: renamed Bardney
- 5 October 1970: closed
Location

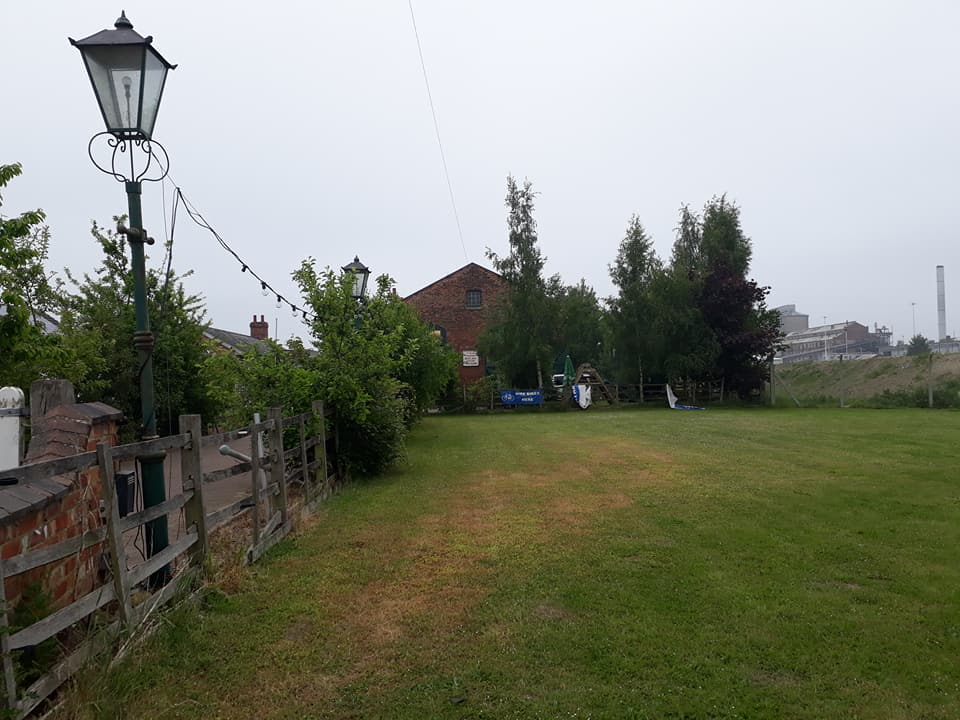

Bardney railway station was a station in Bardney, Lincolnshire. North of the station the line split in two with one branch going to Lincoln and the other to Louth.

Bardney station was removed brick by brick and placed in the care of Railworld in Peterborough.

== Route ==
Preceding station	Disused railways	Following station
Five Mile House	Great Northern Railway; Lincolnshire Loop Line	Southrey
Terminus	Great Northern Railway; Louth to Bardney line	Kingthorpe
