= South Willingham =

Village and civil parish in Lincolnshire, England

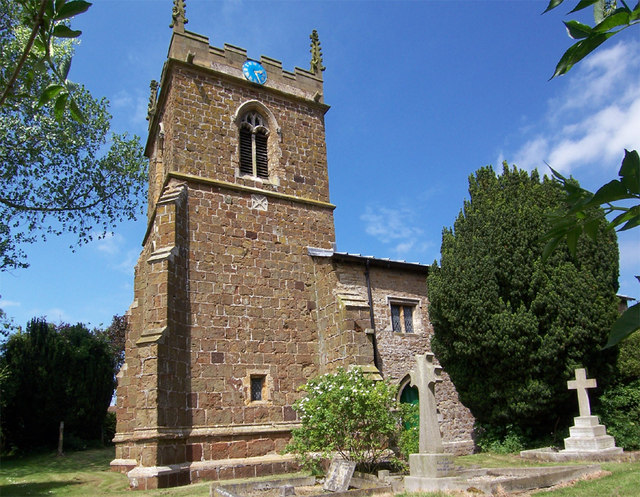
- St Martin's Church, South Willingham

- Location within Lincolnshire
- Population: 160 (2011)
- OS grid reference: TF195833
  - London: 125 mi (201 km) S
- District: East Lindsey
- Shire county: Lincolnshire
- Region: East Midlands
- Country: England
- Sovereign state: United Kingdom
- Post town: Market Rasen
- Postcode district: LN8
- Dialling code: 01507
- Police: Lincolnshire
- Fire: Lincolnshire
- Ambulance: East Midlands
- UK Parliament: Louth and Horncastle

South Willingham is a village and civil parish in the East Lindsey district of Lincolnshire, England, and partly within the Lincolnshire Wolds Area of Outstanding Natural Beauty, . It is situated 1 mile (2 km) south of the A157 Lincoln to Louth road, 15 miles (24 km) west of Lincoln, where the central Lincolnshire Vale and the Lincolnshire Wolds meet. Its population was 160 at the 2011 census, down from a maximum of 341 in 1851.

Much of the village formed part of the Heneage Estate; Hainton Hall is a mile north of the village. At South Willingham is Belmont transmitting station, the second tallest structure in the UK.

The geology under the village is unusually complex with four separate bedrocks located within the parish. Sand, gravel and clay have all been quarried in the parish; the clay pit supplied a brickworks in the Victorian era.

== History ==
There are four bowl barrows at the east of the parish adjacent to the B1125 High Street; two within the parish boundary, and two just outside with one each in Gayton le Wold and Burgh on Bain (at 53.344792°N 0.177693°W). The latter appears in Historic England's 2021 Heritage at Risk report. These Bronze Age burial mounds date from 2400 to 1500 BC. Aerial photographs and early OS Maps show evidence of further barrows, now destroyed, north-east from Inns Farm which is north-west from the village on Hainton Road close to the neighbouring parish of Hainton. A Royal Observer Corps nuclear monitoring post was installed in the bowl barrow on the High Street, close to the junction with the Donington Road in 1959. Officially known as the Burgh on Bain Post, it was used until 1991.

In 1964 Beaker Pottery dating from about 1150-1400BC was found close to the sand pit at the end of Moors Lane.

Willingham derives from the hām—Old English for homestead, village, manor or estate—of Willa's people. South Willingham is recorded in the Domesday Book as "Ulingeham", in the hundred of Wraggoe, and contained three manors owned by different lords. The first contained 11 villagers and two smallholders, with four ploughlands, 2.5 lord's and 2 men's plough teams, and a meadow of 77 acres (31 ha). The lord in 1066 was Almer, the lordship passing in 1086 to William of Verley, who controlled 10 manors in north-east Lincolnshire under the archbishop of St Peter's, York, Thomas of Bayeux, who became tenant-in-chief to king William I. The second contained four villagers and one smallholder, with 1.6 ploughlands, one lord's and one men's plough team, and a meadow of 36 acres (15 ha). The lord in 1066 was Eskil, the lordship passing in 1086 to Wadard—a nobleman depicted in the Bayeux Tapestry—under Odo of Bayeux as tenant-in-chief to the king. The third contained 13 freemen, 2.5 ploughlands, three men's plough teams and a meadow of 40 acres (16 ha). The lord in 1066 was Koddi, the lordship passing in 1086 to Gerard under Rainer of Brimeux as tenant-in-chief to the king. By c.1115 South Willingham is written in documentary evidence as 'Willingheham', in 1121–23 as 'Welingeham', and c.1160 as 'Wellingeham'.

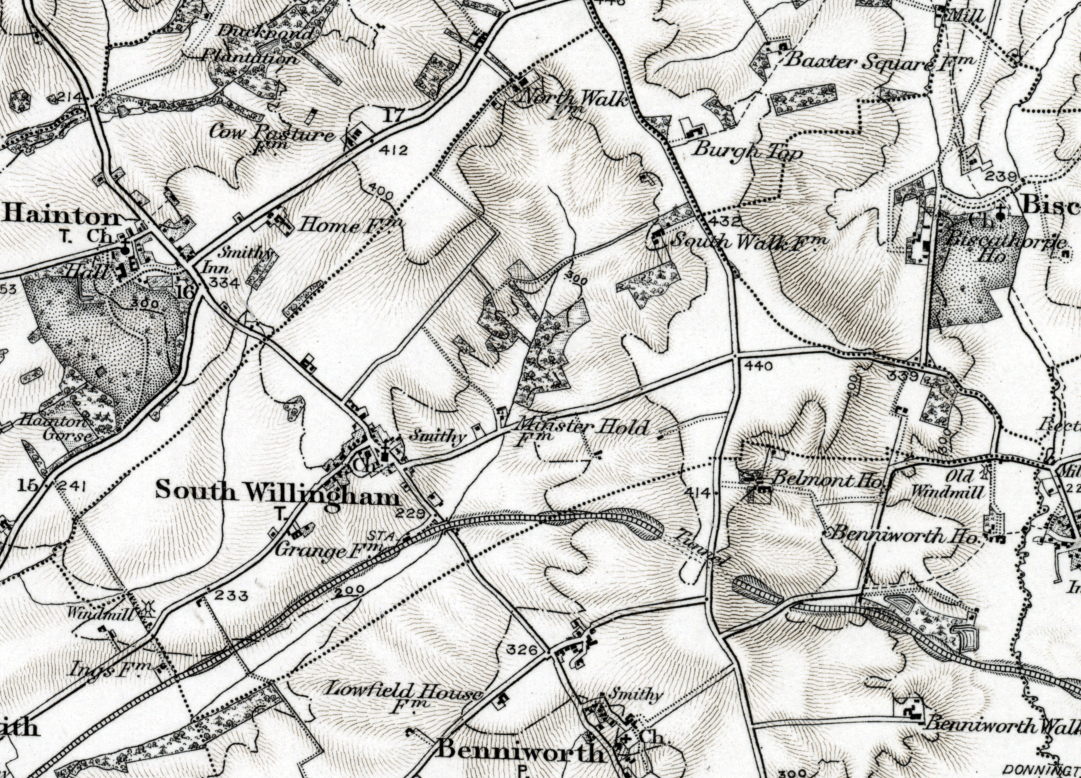
South Willingham in 1899

South Willingham's Anglican parish church is dedicated to St Martin, and dates from the early 13th century.

There is aerial photographic evidence that the developed area of the village extended over the field to the north of Barkwith Road and to the west of Hainton Road. However the first OS map (published 1856) shows it in its current position.

Before the 1870s Woodbine Cottage at the centre of the village served as the Post Office; from the 1870s the post office had transferred to a village shop opposite, which was run subsequently by the same family until it closed in the 1980s. There has never been a public house in the village. A pinfold is shown on the 1888 map at the edge of the village on Barkwith Road, where the village sign is currently located. It has gone on the 1906 map.

South Willingham had both a Wesleyan and a Free Methodist chapel, built in 1834 and 1855 respectively. The Wesleyan chapel, on Barkwith Road and close to the centre of the village, closed in 1972. The Free Methodist Chapel, sited further along Barkwith Road, closed in 1933; both are now converted to dwellings.

A school was built on Blacksmith Lane in 1834 for 30 children (the 1885 Kelly's Directory, the first to mention the school, says 40 children, but subsequent issues say 30). Average attendance was reported as 16 children in 1885, 22 in 1889, 18 in 1909 and 13 in 1913. It closed in 1918. The remaining children transferred to the school in Hainton, the South Willingham building since converted to a residence.

A tower windmill was sited to the north-east from Mill Cottages on the Barkwith Road. The corn mill was built around the 1850s [a miller living at Mill House first appears in the 1861 census] and fitted with six sails by Saundersons of Louth, but converted to four sails in the 1890s. The sails were removed in 1935 and the tower was demolished in 1958. When working, this mill also served a sizable area to the western side of the village as neighbouring mills on the central Lincolnshire vale were some distance away. Taken from the 1888 OS map, these mills included two at Wragby (4.5 miles (7.2 km) away from the South Willingham mill by road), Market Rasen (7.5 miles (12.1 km)), two at Ludford (6.3 miles (10.1 km)) and at Hemingby (9 miles (14.5 km)). However, to the east of the village there were two corn mills just outside the parish boundary. Benniworth Windmill was located 120 yards (110 m) from the eastern parish boundary and close to Donington on Bain. Donington on Bain water mill was only a further 350m away. Other neighbouring mills to the east included the windmill at Goulceby (6.5 miles (10.5 km) south east) and the water mill at Burgh on Bain (5.2 miles (8.4 km)).

A medieval windmill stood on the southern parish boundary, to the west of the Benniworth Road. The mound for this mill was discovered using aerial photographs and is recorded on the 1978 OS Map and subsequent maps as a Mill Mound. The 1856 First edition OS Map shows a building there but later maps show an empty field.

Much of the village formed part of the Heneage Estate; Hainton Hall is a mile north of the village. The woodwork of the estate buildings were painted a distinctive Post Office red. Most of the remaining land was owned by the Church, with Glebe Farm (now called Grange Farm) providing for the upkeep of the Church and the living that supported the Rector. Land to the east of the High Street forms part of the Stenigot Estate.

In 1957 the Heneage Estate auctioned off 34 dwellings and smallholdings [over half the village] in South Willingham and further property in surrounding villages. A tower windmill at the edge of the parish was demolished in 1958.

The village came second in the 1979 Lincolnshire Best Kept Village competition (Class I; population between 100 and 500). It also came third in the 1983 competition. The award plaque is close to the phone kiosk at the centre of the village but that reads Best Kept Village 1980.

== Governance ==
South Willingham parish council is the lowest tier of local government, responsible for services including allotments, cemeteries, play areas, street furniture and neighbourhood development plans. The parish is in the Binbrook Ward which covers ten local parishes and sends one councillor to the East Lindsey District Council, the next highest tier of government, which is responsible for services including economic, business and tourism support, housing benefits, collection of local taxes, refuse, planning and environmental control, licensing, and leisure facilities. Above this, the parish is represented by one councillor for the Louth Wolds Division of Lincolnshire County Council, the council provision including highway maintenance, social care, libraries, heritage sites, school admissions, trading standards, fire and rescue, emergency planning, and public health.

For the UK parliament, South Willingham is represented through the Louth and Horncastle constituency, whose sitting Member of Parliament is Victoria Atkins of the Conservative Party. Prior to Brexit in 2020, South Willingham was represented in the European Parliament through the East Midlands constituency.

== Geography ==
The village is 1 mile (1.6 km) south-west from the A157 road, 8 miles (13 km) south-east from Market Rasen, 10 miles (16 km) north from Horncastle, 10 miles west from Louth and 15 miles (24 km) north-east from the city and county town of Lincoln. The civil parish is 3.5 miles (6 km) east to west and 1.75 miles (3 km) north to south, covering 2,043 acres (827 ha)—expanded from 1,900 acres (769 ha) in the 1880s—and is on the western edge of the Lincolnshire Wolds, an Area of Outstanding Natural Beauty (AOB). The AOB runs north–south through the village. Part of the eastern boundary of the parish follows the course of the River Bain.

The main portion of the village was designated a conservation area in January 1994. The core of the village was reported to be in poor condition, deteriorating, and of high vulnerability in Historic England's 2019 Heritage at Risk report, however it is not mentioned in the 2021 report.

=== Topography ===
Situated on the first hill on the western edge of the Wolds, there is an uninterrupted view from the village to Lincoln Cathedral, 15 miles (24 km) across the Central Lincolnshire Vale between the Wolds and the Lincolnshire Edge.

The village is on a small rise 100m above ordnance datum (AOD) towards the south west of the parish. A valley (75m AOD) separates it from the hill running north–south to the east of the parish, along which the High Street runs (135m AOD). Continuing east, the other side of the High Street, is the glacial valley of the River Bain (69m AOD).

The parish lies on a complex watershed with rain draining away in three different directions. Rain falling to the north west of the village drains west via Holton cum Beckering and then Stainton Beck, joining the Barlings Eau at Langworth and then into the River Witham. Rain falling to the south and east of the village and west of the High Street, drains south west via Stainfield Beck at Wragby and joins the Barlings Eau north of Bardney. Rain falling to the east of the High Street drains into the River Bain, which runs south via Horncastle and into the Witham at Dogdyke. The Witham flows into the North Sea at Boston.

=== Geology ===
The bedrock geology of the parish is also complex, as the parish lies on the boundary where clays and mudstones of the Central Lincolnshire Vale meet the chalk of the Wolds. The bedrock changes three times under the parish, specifically in the area between the village and the High Street. From west to east, the bedrock changes from Kimmeridge Clay to Spilsby Sandstone to Claxby Ironstone to Tealby Mudstone, covered in places with superficial deposits of sand and gravel. The chalk bedrocks of the Wolds start a mile further on, but outside the parish, east of the River Bain.

There are old quarries in the parish, none of them currently active. Clay was excavated at the brickworks close to the railway station in middle of the 19th century; however the brickworks had gone on the 1906 map. A sand pit is shown on the 1887 OS map at the end of Moors Lane; it is labelled as ‘old sand pit’ on the 1906 map. Similarly a gravel pit close to Low Belmont Farm on the 1887 map is also labelled old gravel pit on the 1906 map. A gravel pit adjacent to Gravel Pit cottages (south east of Poplar Farm) appears to be very small on the 1887 map and much larger on the 1906 and subsequent maps. However, there is no trace of it on the 1978 OS map.

In 2013, exploratory oil wells were proposed in the River Bain valley at Biscathorpe, 700m north east of the parish boundary. However, in 2019, despite drilling to a depth of 2133m, no oil had been found and the well was capped.

== Demography ==
According to the 2011 census, the population of South Willingham Civil Parish totals 160 people (86 men and 74 women) in 78 households. All households described their ethnicity as white, and of the population of 160, 97 (61%) people stated their religion as Christian, 50 (31%) as no religion, the remaining 13 (8%) not stating a preference.

The various censuses show that the population of South Willingham increased rapidly in the early 19th century and peaked in the 1850s at 341. Since then, there has been a slow decline in population numbers until the mid-20th century. Since then the village population has held reasonably steady, and in the 2011 Census it stood at 160. The number of households follow a similar, but delayed, curve. However, the number of households have increased again since the middle of the 20th century to the current high of 78.

South Willingham Population and Households taken from Census records

Year	Inhabitants	Households
1801	180	
1811	182	
1821	202	
1831	212	44
1841	296	51
1851	341	55
1861	340	66
1871	307	66
1881	330	68
1891	313	70

Year	Inhabitants	Households
1901	280	67
1911	252	63
1921	226	57
1931	200	56
1939		
1951	180	56
1961	153	50
1971		
1981		
1991		

Year	Inhabitants	Households
2001	170	70
2011	160	78
2021		

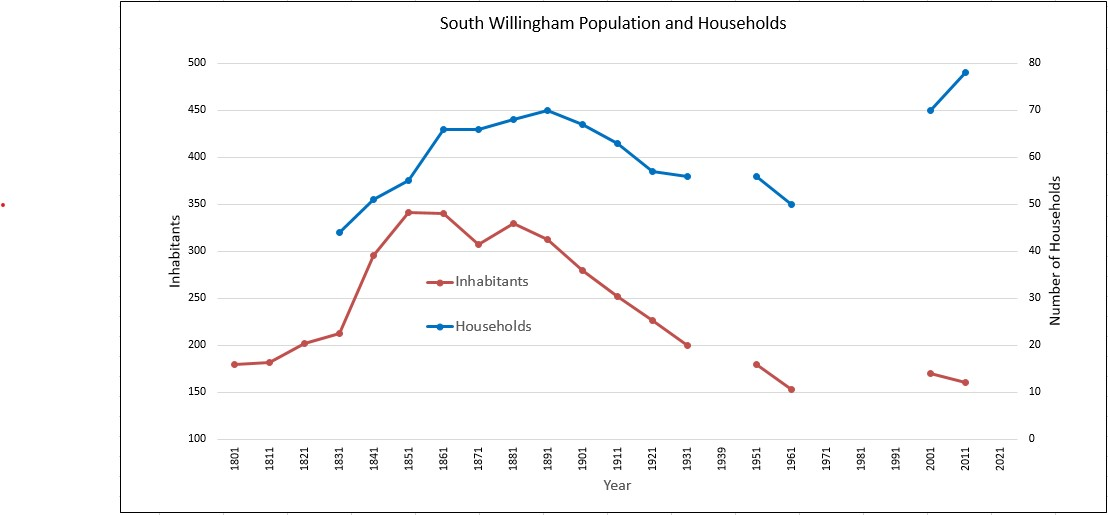
South Willingham Population and Household Trends

== Economy ==
There are eight farms labelled as such in the parish; Grange Farm, Inn Farm, Church Farm, Corner Farm, Poplar Farm, North Walk Farm, South Walk Farm and Low Belmont Farm. However, three of those farms are no longer operating in the agricultural sector.

At least one of the cottages in the village is let as a holiday home.

A brickworks existed east of Benniworth Road and south of the railway. Maps show that it included a quarry, for the clay used. Census records between 1841 and 1891 show that up to seven people were occupied making bricks and tiles, reducing to one person in 1891. It is not known if the brickworks existed before 1841. The buildings marked as ‘brick yard’ on the 1887 OS Map are not shown on the 1906 map.

Piper Sports Cars were manufactured by Emmbrook Engineering from a large brick and asbestos industrial shed in the railway station yard. The kit cars used fiberglass bodies with Triumph and Ford components and were made in the village between June 1973 and the mid-1970s. The company had to diversify as a result of an economic downturn, and by using their fibreglass expertise, started to produce corner baths and shower trays, trading as Marenda-Lindsey Ltd. That company ceased trading in 2016. The building is now used by welding and steel fabrication company.

The village is home to many small businesses. At the end of 2019 these included photographer, accountant, architect, stone mason, decorator, Dog breeder and groomer, training consultancy and a company selling parquet flooring.

== Culture and community ==
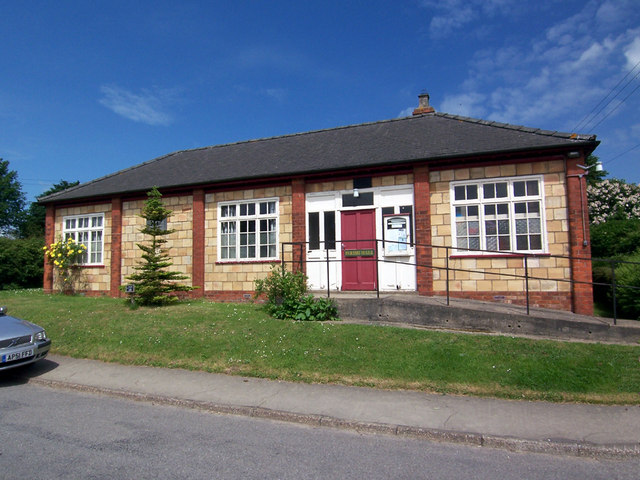
South Willingham parish hall

South Willingham Parish Hall was gifted to the village in 1922 by Lord Heneage, according to the plaque at its entrance. The hall is used for social and public events, and meetings, such as coffee mornings and film nights, and groups for art, dance, and history. During the summer it is used as a refreshment stop for cyclists. South Willingham Parish Council meet at the hall which is used as the local polling station.

St Martin's Anglican church is part of the c.1976-established Parish of the Barkwith Group, which incorporates the further six surrounding churches and former ecclesiastical parishes of East Barkwith, West Barkwith, East Torrington, West Torrington, Sixhills, and Hainton. A service at South Willingham is usually held on the first Sunday of each month. A carol service is held every year.

The village's two Methodist Chapels and school have now been converted to dwellings.

The village has a newsletter, distributed quarterly.

=== Public services ===
Mains water is supplied by Anglian Water. Of the 34 dwellings listed in the 1957 sale document, only two were not connected to mains water at that time. Prior to connection, communal and private pumps and wells supplied water. The 1887 OS Map shows the sites of communal hand pumps; one on Donington Road opposite Corner Farm, and another on Barkwith Road where the driveway of ‘Wurzel Patch’ is now. 7 of the 34 dwellings listed in the 1957 sale document are recorded as having their own water hand pumps. Wells and pumps in the village extracted water from the underlying Kimmeridge Clay which includes layers of shale and ironstone. In some cases this resulted in water that was "ferruginous and smelt offensively".

The village does not have mains sewerage; each property is connected to its own septic tank. Surface water drainage has been installed under some roads in the village and channels surface water from roadside gullies and some field drains into nearby water courses.

The village has never been connected to mains Town or Natural Gas. However, major National Transmission System gas pipelines pass 1.5 miles (2.4 km) to the west of the parish and 3.5 miles (5.6 km) south of the parish on their way to Hatton compressor station.

Electricity is supplied by Western Power Distribution on three-phase poles with aerial connections to dwellings. Of the 34 dwellings listed in the 1957 sale document, only two were not connected to the electricity supply at that time.

South Willingham is connected to the Burgh on Bain telephone exchange—part of the Louth/Alford/Spilsby 01507 dialling code—on the A157 and High Street junction. There was a telegraph office at the railway station until it closed in 1951. A telephone kiosk is at the centre of the village close to the north wall of Woodbine Cottage on Station Road; the telephone inside was removed in 2018; the empty kiosk is still awaiting its new use. Next to the kiosk is a pole-mounted post box which was installed in 2005; the previous box was built into the front wall of the village shop and post office.

Mobile phone signal coverage varies with provider. O_{2} provide a high strength 4G and 3G signal over 95% of the parish, with masts at West Barkwith and Belmont. Three 4G is low strength, whilst their 3G is high over most of the parish except the village. Three's mast is at West Barkwith. Likewise EE 3G is high strength over most of the parish except the village, and 4G is high strength to the east of the parish and low to the west, including the village. Their masts are at West Barkwith and Belmont. Vodafone 3G and 4G is high strength over most of the parish except the village. The Vodafone mast is at Belmont. 5G is not available in the parish from any provider.

Fibre Optic cable was installed to a cabinet in the village in June 2018. Before that, broadband download speeds in the village were recorded between 1.8 Mbit/s and 8.1 Mbit/s. Broadband capability was added to Burgh on Bain telephone exchange on 18 May 2005. There is no cable TV available in the parish, but like the rest of country, subscription TV is available by satellite or multiple providers on the internet. FreeView digital TV, as part of the BBC Yorkshire and Lincolnshire and ITV Yorkshire franchise regions, is transmitted from the Belmont TV mast.

== Landmarks ==
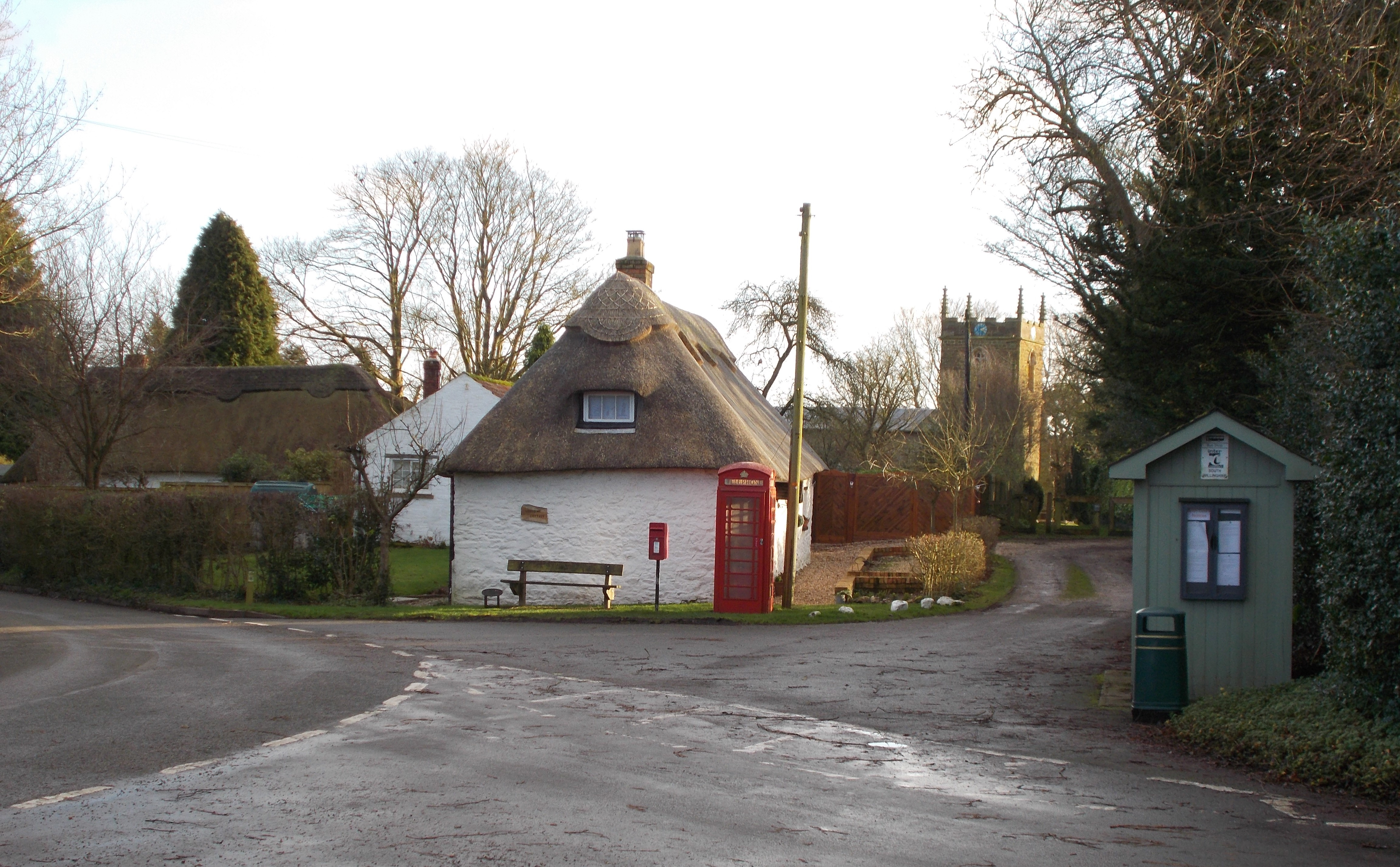
South Willingham village centre

The parish has six Grade II and one Grade II* listed buildings. These include the church, two thatched cottages in the village centre, two other cottages and two farm houses.

South Willingham's Anglican parish church is dedicated to St Martin, and is Grade II* listed. The church, built of greenstone, was rebuilt between 1835 and 1838, but the Perpendicular style tower and screen remain. The tower houses a clock and three bells, the largest of which is dated 1612; the clock mechanism was made by J W Benson of Ludgate Hill in London. The clock was repaired and refurbished in 2016, and is still chiming the hours in 2021. In 1964 Pevsner noted a 1571 paten cover by John Morley. The graveyard surrounds the church on three sides and has over 140 marked graves, the earliest of which is dated 1802.

The Belmont transmitting station is sited close to the High Street. At 1,154 feet (352 m) in height, it is the second tallest structure in the UK and 14th in the European Union. It was constructed in 1965 and broadcasts digital television and both analogue and digital radio to Lincolnshire, eastern Yorkshire, northern parts of Norfolk and some parts of Nottinghamshire.

== Transport ==
Roads through the village are minor, with passing places. They run north to Hainton, west to East Barkwith, south to Benniworth and east to Belmont and Donington on Bain. The A157 Lincoln to Louth road passes to the north, outside of the civil parish. A prehistoric trackway, later adopted by the Romans, now the B1225 road, running north–south along the western edge of the Wolds from Caistor to Baumber passes through the eastern half of the parish, and a mile away from the village. It is known as the High Street and marked on modern OS Maps as such. An unmetalled road known as Moors Lane runs east from a junction with Hainton Road on the northern boundary of the village.

South Willingham railway station closed in the 1950s. It was on the Great Northern Railway branch line from Bardney to Louth. It is 650 yards (600 m) south of the village centre on the Benniworth Road. The station included one platform, two sidings and a signal box. The branch was mostly single track and crossed the Benniworth Road on an arched underbridge, now demolished. East of the station (just over the parish boundary in Benniworth) the railway passed under the High Street in a 557 yards (509 m) long tunnel, known as South Willingham Tunnel. The tunnel is also known as Benniworth Tunnel or High Street Tunnel, however GEOGIS, the British Rail track and structures database calls it South Willingham Tunnel. The tunnel and its approach cuttings are now a SSSI. The station opened in December 1876 and closed in November 1951 to passengers and December 1958 to goods traffic.

There is a bus stop with a timber shelter in the centre of the village at the junction of Station Road and Barkwith Road. It is used by the Stagecoach Lincolnshire number 50 Louth to Lincoln bus service which has 6 buses daily in each direction. It takes about 45 minutes to get to Lincoln, and 24 minutes to get to Louth using this service. Two further demand responsive services are provided for the parish by Lincolnshire InterConnect, with connection to villages between and around Louth, Market Rasen and Wragby.
