= Edward James Willson =

English architect, antiquary, architectural writer and mayor

Edward James Willson FSA
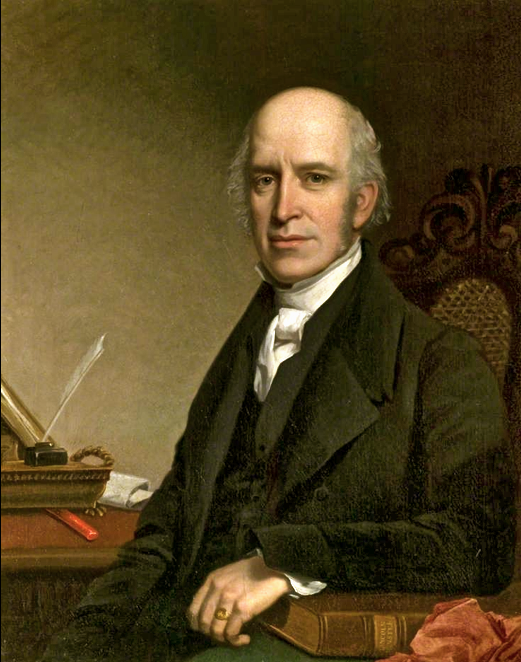
- Edward James Willson, 1853
- Born: 21 June 1787; Lincoln, England
- Died: 8 September 1854 (aged 67); Lincoln, England
- Occupation: Architect
- Awards: Fellow of the Society of Antiquaries
- Buildings: St John's Roman Catholic Church, Nottingham
- Projects: Restoration of Lincoln Castle 1834-45. Worked on Hainton Hall and Village for Heneage family 1833-47.

Edward James Willson FSA (21 June 1787–8 September 1854) was an English architect, antiquary, architectural writer, and mayor of Lincoln in 1851–2.

== Life ==
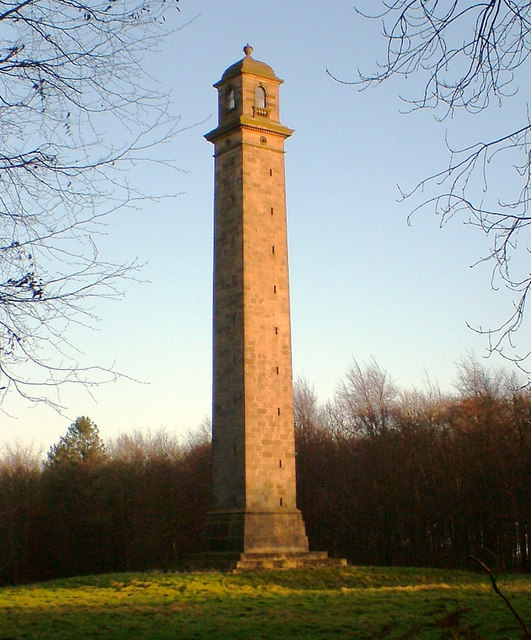
Pelham's Pillar, 1843-48

Born in Lincoln in 1787, he was the eldest son of William Willson (1745-1827) of Lincoln by his wife Clarissa, daughter of William Tenney. Robert William Willson was his younger brother. He was brought up a Roman Catholic, and, after education at the grammar school in the Greyfriars, Lincoln, he joined his father's building company. His father was a cabinet maker and joiner, but also described himself as a "master-builder". He was working as a woodcarver in Lincoln Cathedral around 1805 when a chance meeting with John Britton led to his friendship with the latter and developed his interest in architectural writing. He is said to have received some architectural training from a "local architect". This is likely to have been William Lumby, a Lincoln architect, who was also the Cathedral surveyor.

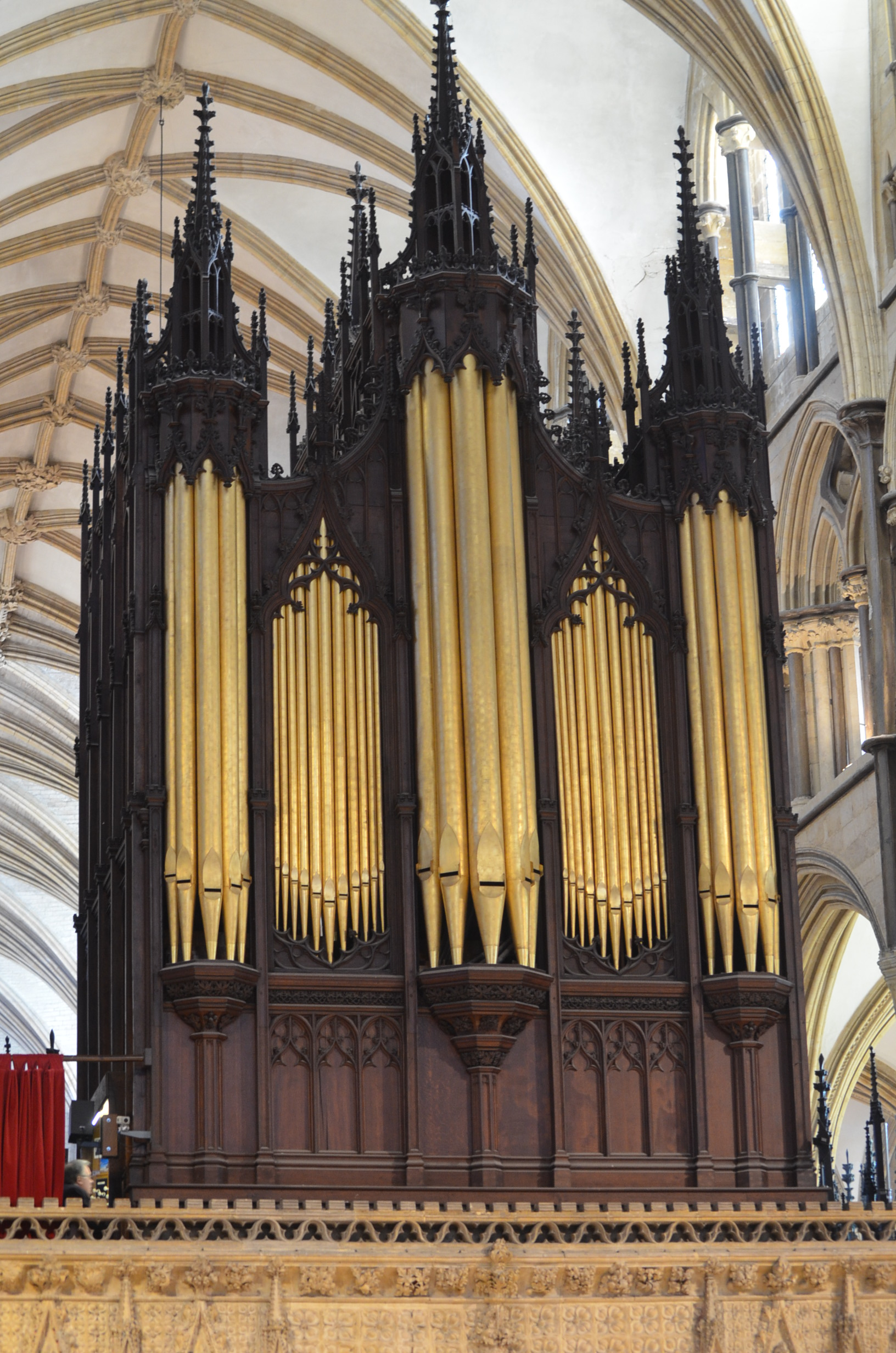
Organcase, Lincoln Cathedral designed by Willson

By 1817 Willson had established himself as an architect when he was engaged by Archdeacon Henry Vincent Bayley in the restoration of Messingham church. This was followed by his superintendence of repairs or restorations of churches at Haxey, Louth, West Rasen, Saundby, Staunton, South Willingham and other churches in Lincolnshire and Nottinghamshire. He designed St John the Evangelist's Catholic Church, Nottingham and other Roman Catholic chapels at Hainton, Louth, Melton Mowbray, and Grantham, which are early examples of the Gothic Revival.

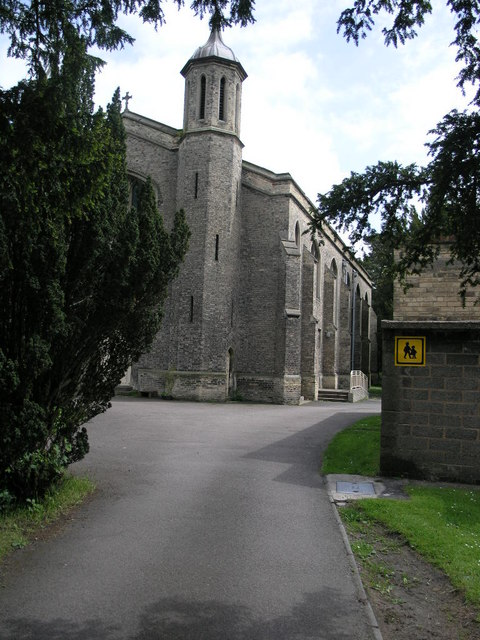
St Saviour, Retford (1829)

His first major project was the Grade II listed St Saviour's Church, Retford, 1829, which was the first of four parish churches he designed. The building has largely survived intact. In 1826 he designed the organ case for Lincoln Cathedral. Following his appointment as Surveyor to the County Committee in 1833 he was between 1834 and 1845 responsible for he restoration of the keep, towers, and walls of Lincoln Castle.

Pelham's Pillar, 128 feet high, on a hill at Cabourne between Caistor and Grimsby, was designed by Willson for the Earl of Yarborough. Willson was honoured as a citizen in Lincoln, and became a city magistrate in 1834 and mayor in 1852.

=== Family and pupils ===
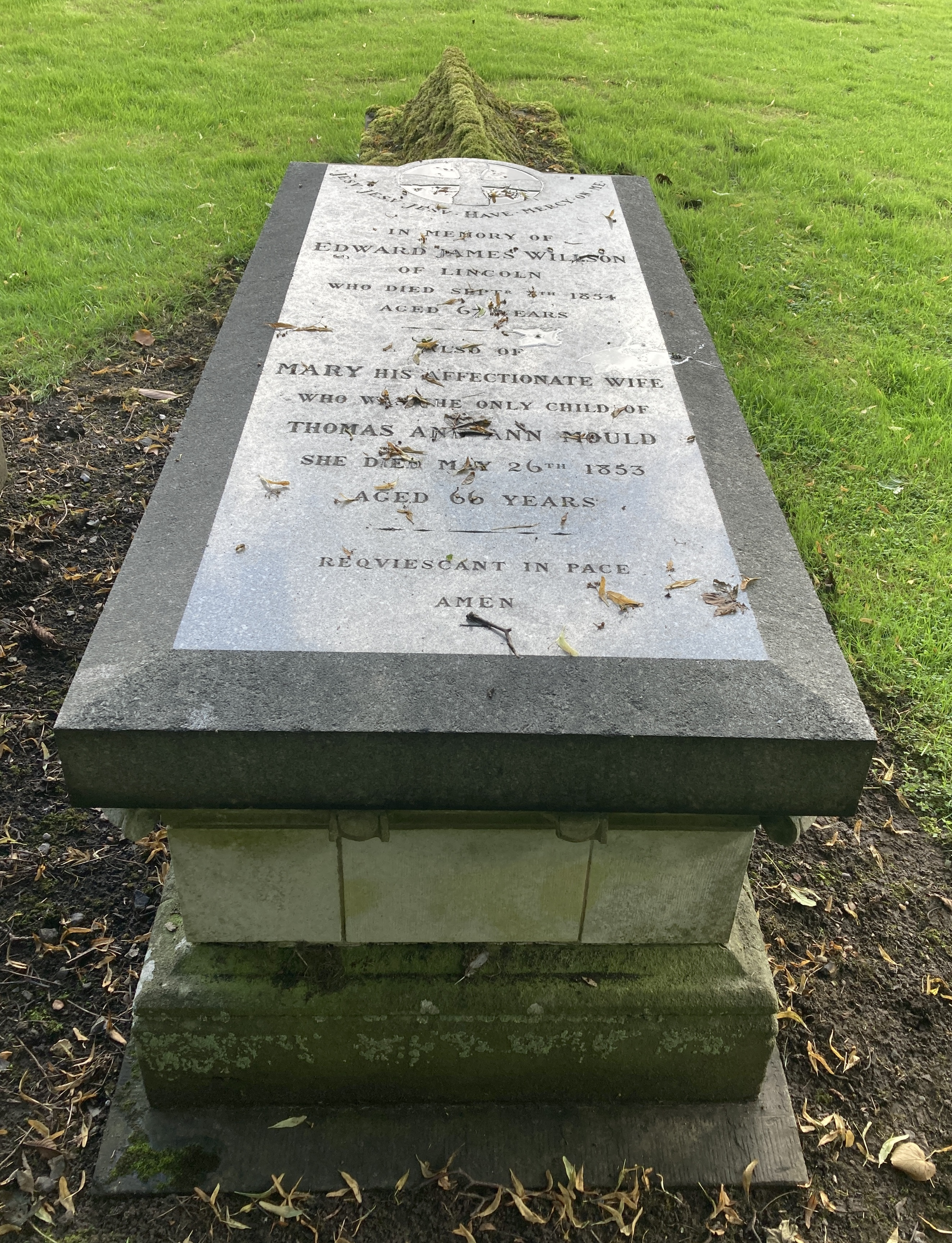
The grave of Edward James Willson in the churchyard at Hainton in Lincolnshire

Willson died at Lincoln on 8 September 1854. He had married, in 1821, Mary, daughter of Thomas Mould of Snarford and Hainton and who was related to the Heneage family. By her he had two surviving sons. One of his sons, Thomas John Willson (1824-1903), also became a successful architect in London, mainly building Roman Catholic churches. Edward Willson and his wife, who died the year before him, were both buried at Hainton. He trained Frederick James Jobson as an architect before Jobson embarked on a career in the Methodist ministry. Jobson praised his works and writings as contributing to the Gothic Revival, particularly in Lincolnshire. Also the notable Pre-Raphaelite painter James Smetham was articled to Willson in the 1830s.

== Architectural history and local history ==
The importance of Willson as an Architectural historian was recognised by Nikolaus Pevsner in 1972. Initially, Willson had been collecting material for a history of Lincoln and Lincolnshire. This was published in 1816 with a dedication to Lady Monson, under the title The History of Lincoln; containing an account of the Antiquities, Edifices, Trade, and Customs, of that Ancient City; an introductory sketch of the County; and a description of the Cathedral. By 1818 he had supplied his friend John Britton with accounts of Lincoln Cathedral, Boston church, St Peter's, Barton on Humber, and Beverley Minster for volume 5 of Britton'sArchitectural Antiquities, although this volume was not published until 1826. Willson also contributed to Britton's Cathedral Antiquities (1814–35) and Picturesque Antiquities of English Cities (1830). As a result of his association with Britton Willson became a member of the Architects and Antiquaries Club in 1819. Amongst the members of the club was Augustus Charles Pugin This resulted in Willson writings the text to Specimens of Gothic Architecture, with illustrations by Pugin which was published in two volumes in 1821 and 1822. He then wrote jointly with Pugin Examples of Gothic Architecture, consisting of Plans, Sections Elevations and Details which was published in two volumes in 1830 and 1836. Following his death in 1854, John Britton wrote a lengthy obituary on the career and work of Willson, with an appraisal of numerous books written by him. This was published in the Builder.

=== The Lincolnshire Topographical Society ===
Willson appears to have been the moving spirit behind the Lincolnshire Topographical Society, a learned society which took a particular interest in archaeology and architectural history. The only publication of the Topographical Society, appeared in 1843, indicates that the Society was probably formed in 1840 and Willson gave the introductory address on 23 February 1841. Willson outlined a wide-ranging number of objectives for the Society, mentioning that it should follow the example of a Topographical Society recently formed in Wiltshire, presumably by his friend John Britton. In 1843 there were 69 members of society many of whom were of considerable note, including the mathematicians George Boole and Sir Edward Bromhead. Other local architects were well represented including William Adams Nicholson, Henry Goddard, James Sandby Padley and John Langwith of Grantham. However, either in 1844 or 1845 the Society faded out, but it was a precursor to the Lincolnshire Diocesan Architectural Society, which moved to Lincoln in 1856, and from which the Society for Lincolnshire History and Archaeology is directly descended.

=== Archaeological and antiquarian collections ===
During his lifetime Willson built up a very notable collection of Lincolnshire antiquities and items connected with Lincolnshire History. Shortly after his death in 1854, a printed Catalogue of the extensive and valuable collection of books, prints, paintings, ancient and medieval remains, antique porcelain, household furniture and other effects of the late Edward James Willson was prepared. It is assumed that many of his possessions were disposed of at this time and the bulk of his notable collection of archaeological finds were acquired by the Duke of Northumberland and are now on display in the Museum at Alnwick Castle. It may also be at this time that the Lincoln Cathedral Library obtained three folio volumes of monochrome drawings: City and County. Churches, Ruins, Fragments, Miscellaneous Antiquities, Views of Ancient Buildings in Lincoln by R. Cattermole, A. Pugin, F. J. Dobson and others, and The Works Chantry, the Vicars’ College, and outbuildings, the Chancery, the Deanery, Surveys, drawings, notes. The latter consist of medieval and some post-medieval buildings with scale plans, details and mouldings. However, there was a further sale of his manuscripts and drawings at Sotheby's in 1888 The greater part of these papers, contained in 31 volumes or albums and 3 portfolios, were acquired by the Society of Antiquaries of London, and microfilm copies of these are also available at the Lincolnshire Record Office.

== Architectural work ==
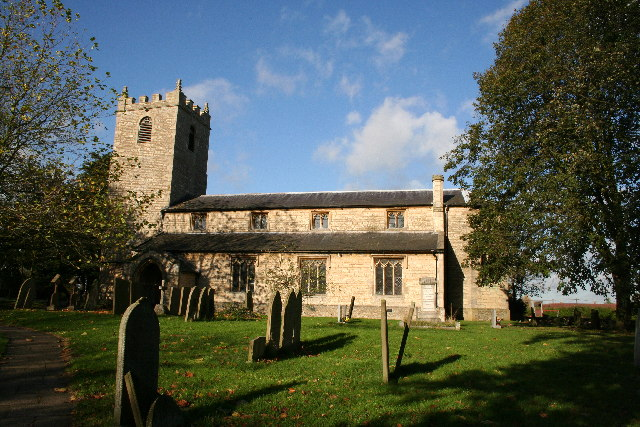
St Mary's Church, Welton, Lincolnshire

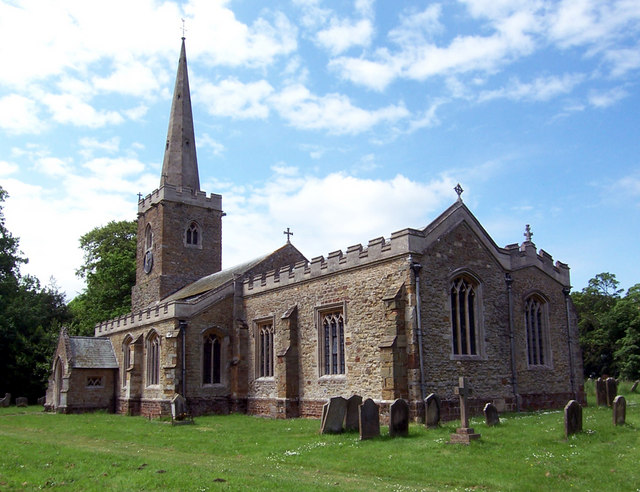
Hainton Church reconstructed by Willson 1843–6

=== Church restoration ===
- Messingham, Lincolnshire: Willson rebuilt nearly all the church except the tower for Henry Bayley, the Archdeacon of Stow, 1817–8.
- Saundby, Nottinghamshire: undertook restoration work in 1823.
- Welton, Lincolnshire: rebuilt nave and chancel in 1823–4.
- Haxey, Lincolnshire: rebuilt north aisle and chapel in 1825–6.
- Louth, Lincolnshire: re-roofed the nave and aisles 1825–7.

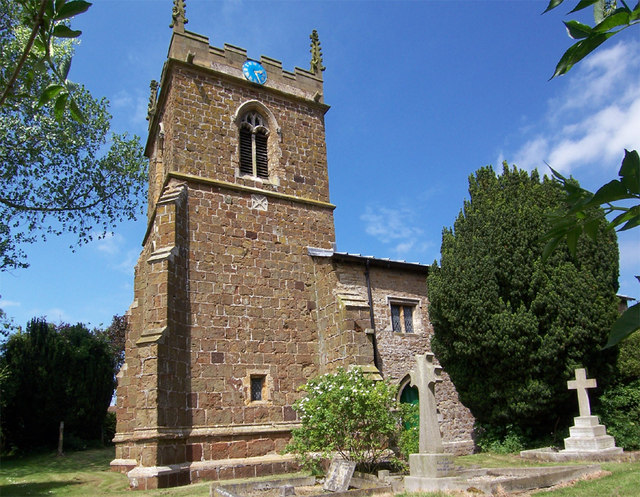
South Willingham Church, tower rebuilt 1838-9

- East Retford, Nottinghamshire: designed St Saviour's Church in 1828-30 - described by Piercy as "in the style of Gothic prevalent in the reign of Henry the eighth". St Saviour's was his first major project and the first of four parish churches that he designed. It is built in yellow brick which has weathered grey.
- West Rasen, Lincolnshire: 1829–30.
- Buslingthorpe, Lincolnshire: Church re-built 1835.
- South Willingham, Lincolnshire: (1838–39) Willson advertised for tenders to take down and re-build the tower and re-build to his plans and specifications in the Lincolnshire Chronicle.
- Hainton, Lincolnshire: reconstructed by Willson in 1843–6.
- St Mary's Church, Staunton in the Vale, Nottinghamshire: 1853 restoration.

=== Roman Catholic Chapel or Churches ===
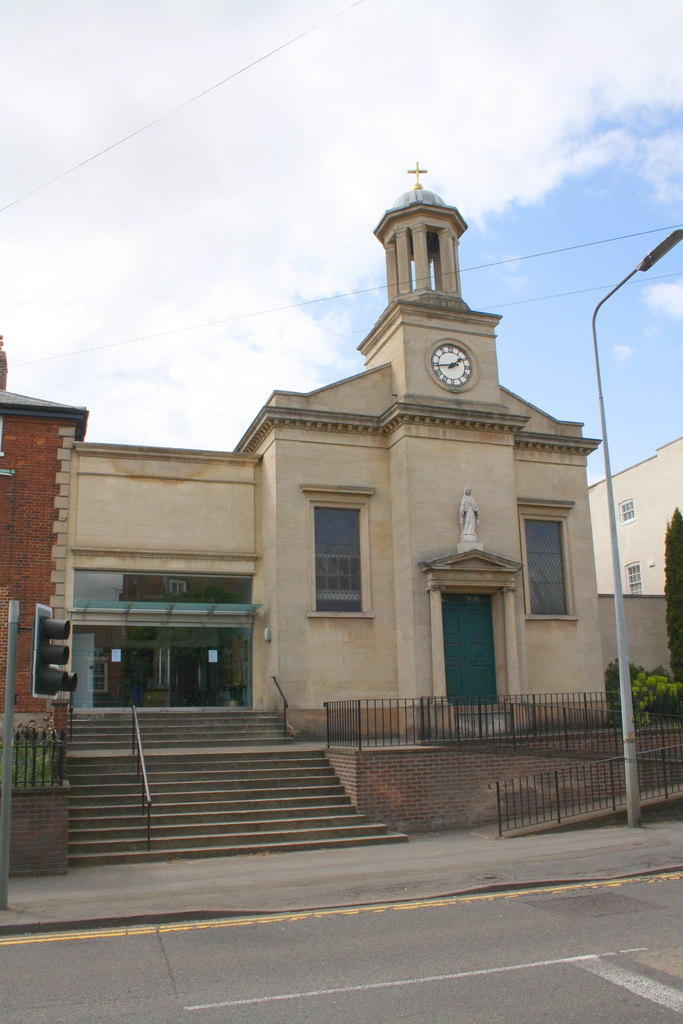
Roman Catholic Church, North Parade, Grantham, 1832

- Nottingham, Nottinghamshire: designed St John Church in 1825–7 for his brother, the Rev R. W. Willson, who was later to become the Bishop of Hobart, Tasmania.
- Louth, Lincolnshire: built St Mary's Roman Catholic Chapel in 1833.

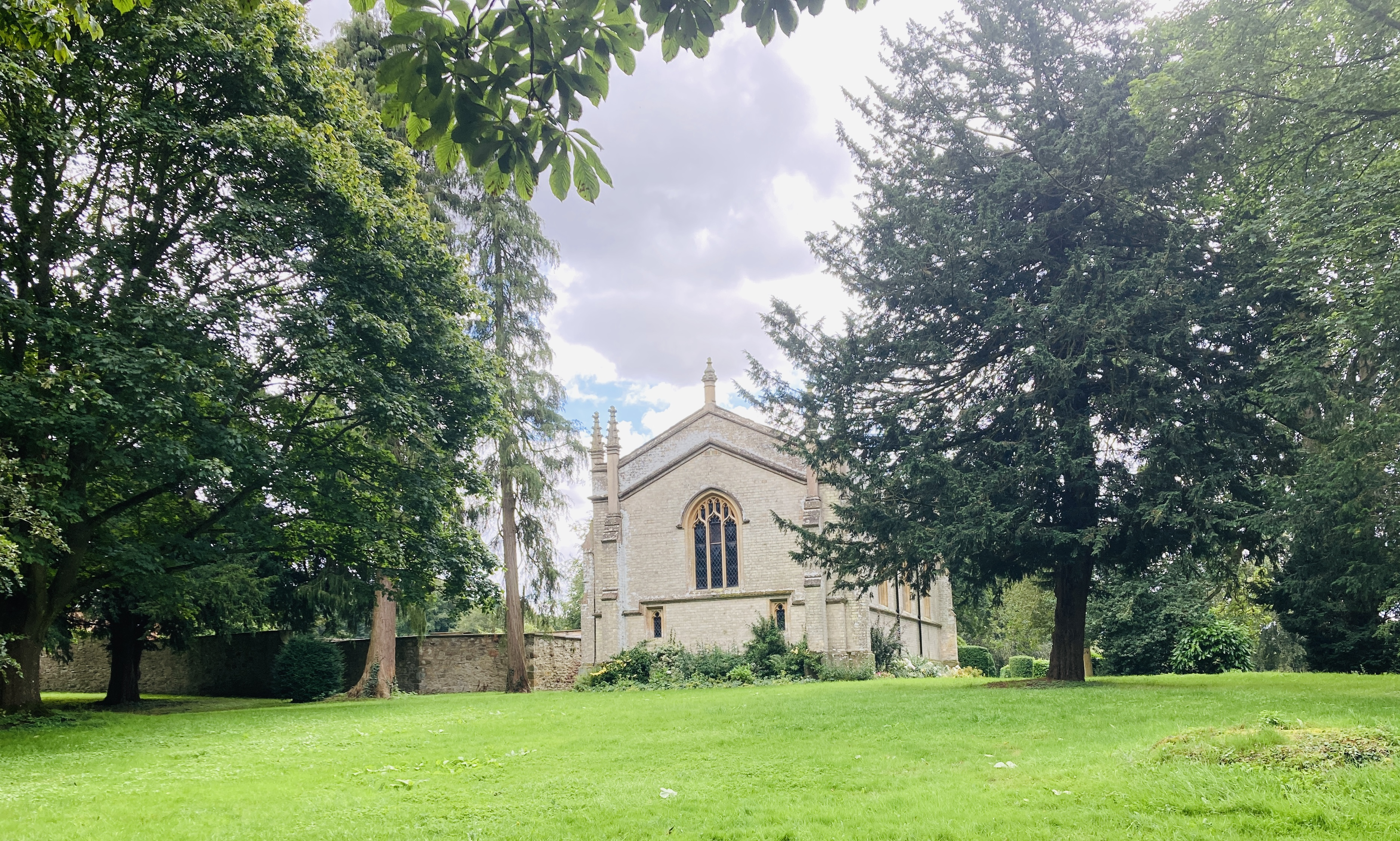
Roman Catholic chapel at Hainton Hall (1836)

- Hainton, Lincolnshire: Roman Catholic chapel in the grounds of Hainton Hall.
- Melton Mowbray, Leicestershire: built St John's Church in 1835.
- Grantham, Lincolnshire: built St Mary's Church in 1832. Only the facade of Willson's original building now survives.
- Market Rasen Holy Rood,(1824). Extended in 1867.

== Houses and estate villages ==
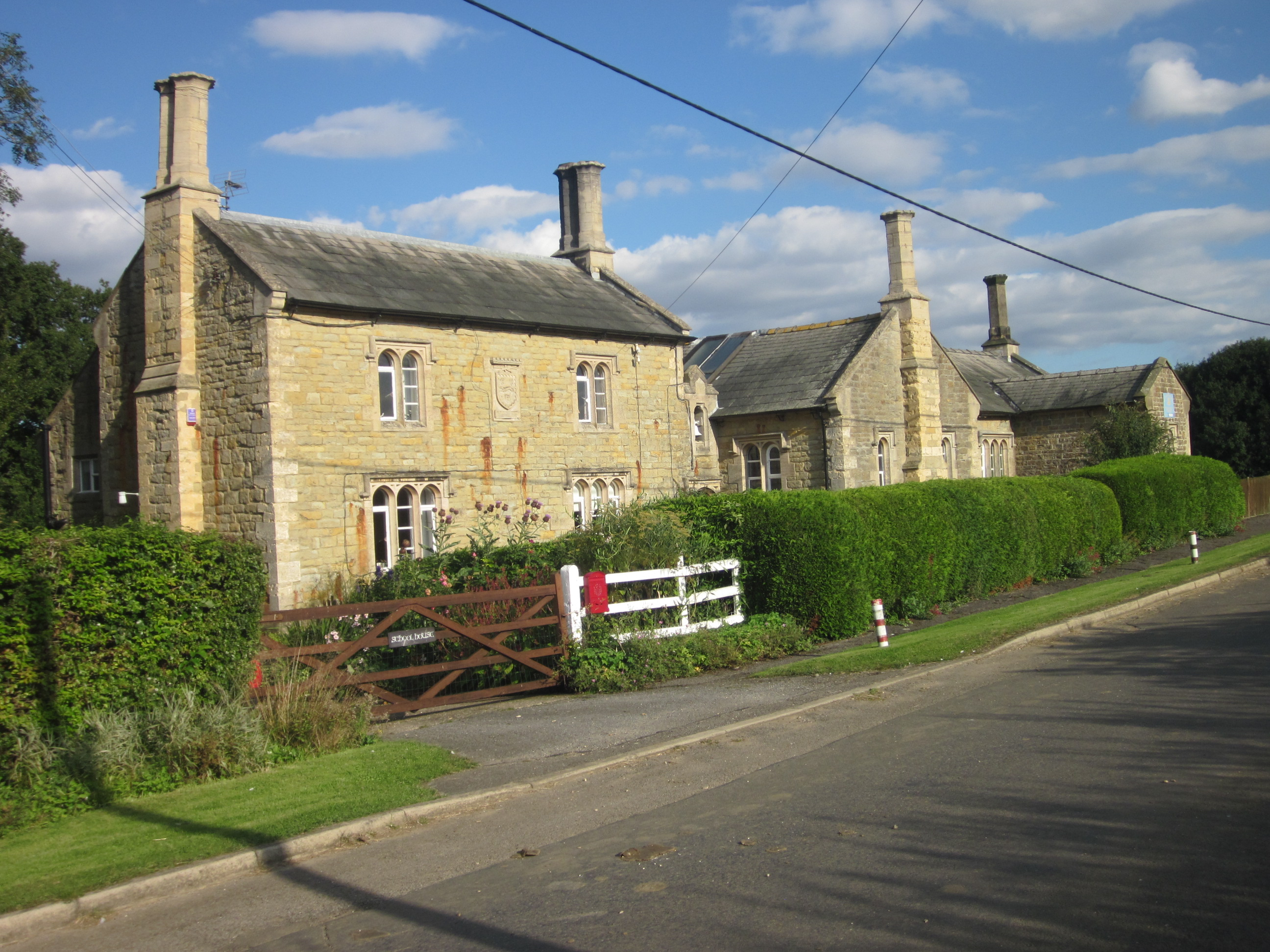
School House and Village School, Hainton by EJ Wilson 1846-7

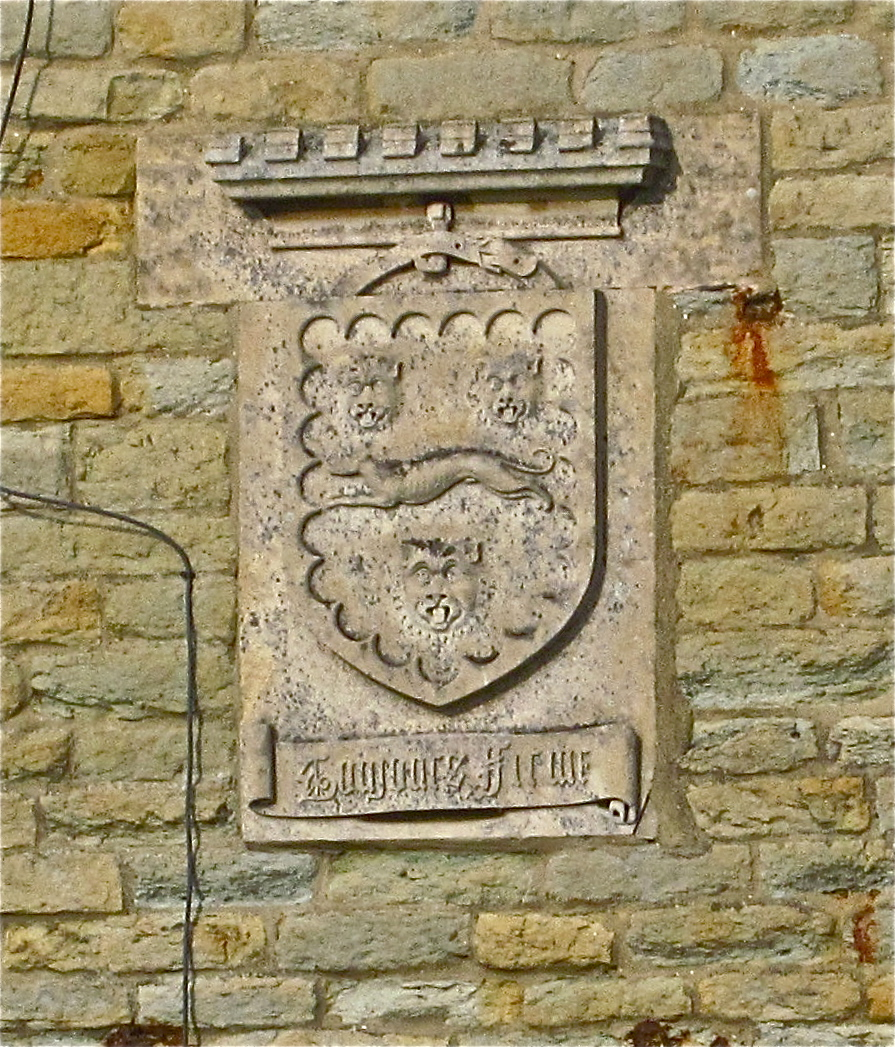
Heneage coat of arms on School House, Hainton, by E J Willson in 1846-7

- Hainton Hall and village school in Hainton. Willson worked extensively for G. E. Heneage, a leading Lincolnshire Roman Catholic who was related to his wife. In 1834 he built the stable for the hall, which is now partially demolished and other estate houses. In 1846-7 the School house and the former village school. These building are of limestone and the schoolhouse prominently displays the Heneage coat of arms. Other estate housing and the Heneage Arms are built with unornamented yellowish brick.

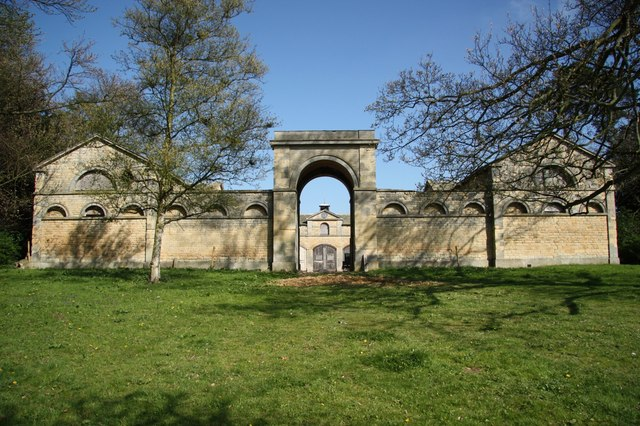
Stable Block, Leadenham Hall

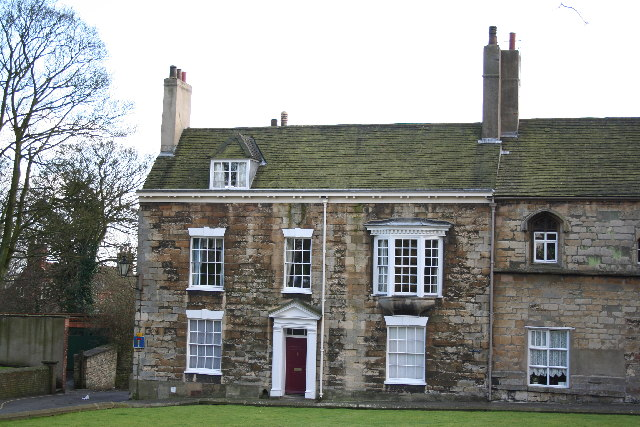
15 Minster Yard - Willson's family home

- Leadenham House, Leadenham: Willson added the stable block in 1833, set round a courtyard with arcaded outer walls.
- Willson's Cottage, Newport, Lincoln.
- 15 Minster Yard, Lincoln: rebuilt under Willson's supervision in 1824. This was the home of the Willson family.

=== Restoration work on Lincoln Castle ===
Willson was commissioned to undertake an initial survey of Lincoln castle in 1832. This was the year previous to his appointment as the surveyor to the Lincolnshire County Committee. In 1835 he presented with Sir Robert Smirke A Report on the outward walls of the castle, and between 1835 and 1845 he was responsible for the restoration of the keep, towers and walls.

=== Pelham’s Pillar ===
Pelham's Pillar is in Caistor, North Lincolnshire on part of the Yarborough estate at Brocklesby, and is a viewing tower or belvedere built to enable the earls to view the estate. It is 39 metres (128 ft) high and is guarded by two stone lions at the door. It is said that, when it was built, everything that could be seen from the top belonged to Charles Anderson-Pelham
