= Barkworth =

Barkworth is an English surname, derived from the hamlet of Barkworth, nowadays East Barkwith and West Barkwith, Lincolnshire, England, and its meaning is hamlet on the hill. Notable people with the surname include:

- Mark Barkworth (c. 1572–1601), English catholic priest and martyr
- Mary Barkworth (born 1941), botanist
- Peter Barkworth (1929–2006), English actor
