= Barkwith =

Barkwith may refer to the following places in the East Lindsey district of Lincolnshire, England:

- East Barkwith
- West Barkwith
