= William Touchet =

William Touchet may refer to:

- William Touchet, 1st Baron Touchet (died 1308), English noble
- William Touchet of Hainton (died 1322), English noble
