= St John the Evangelist's Catholic Church, Nottingham =

St John the Evangelist's Church, George Street, Nottingham
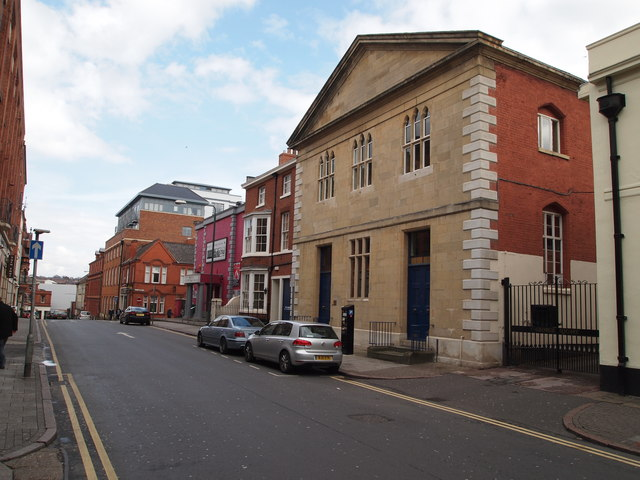
- Former Catholic Church of St John the Evangelist, Nottingham
- St John the Evangelist's Church, George Street, Nottingham
- 52.953851°N 1.145132°W
- OS grid reference: SK 57553 39973
- Location: Nottingham
- Country: England
- Denomination: Roman Catholic

History
- Dedication: St John the Evangelist

Architecture
- Architect: Edward James Willson
- Style: Venetian Gothic
- Completed: 1827

Specifications
- Capacity: 84ft long, 41ft wide and 31ft high
- Length: 84 feet (26 m)
- Width: 41 feet (12 m)
- Height: 31 feet (9.4 m)

St John the Evangelist's Church was the first purpose-built Roman Catholic Church to be built in Nottingham since the English Reformation. Now offices, it is a Grade II listed building.

== History ==
A Roman Catholic congregation had been meeting in Nottingham in a chapel since 1790. The congregation increased to around 150 when a new priest, Father Robert William Willson arrived. He developed plans for a new chapel, and this was designed by the architect Edward James Willson (brother of the priest) and constructed on George Street. The building was 84 ft long, 41 ft wide and 31 ft high and built of red brick, with ashlar front and slate roof, in the Venetian Gothic style.

Adjacent to the church is the Presbytery also by Edward James Willson of 1827, and also Grade II listed.

It was replaced by Nottingham Cathedral in 1850.

== Organ ==
The pipe organ was obtained from George Parsons of London.
