= William Touchet of Hainton =

English nobleman

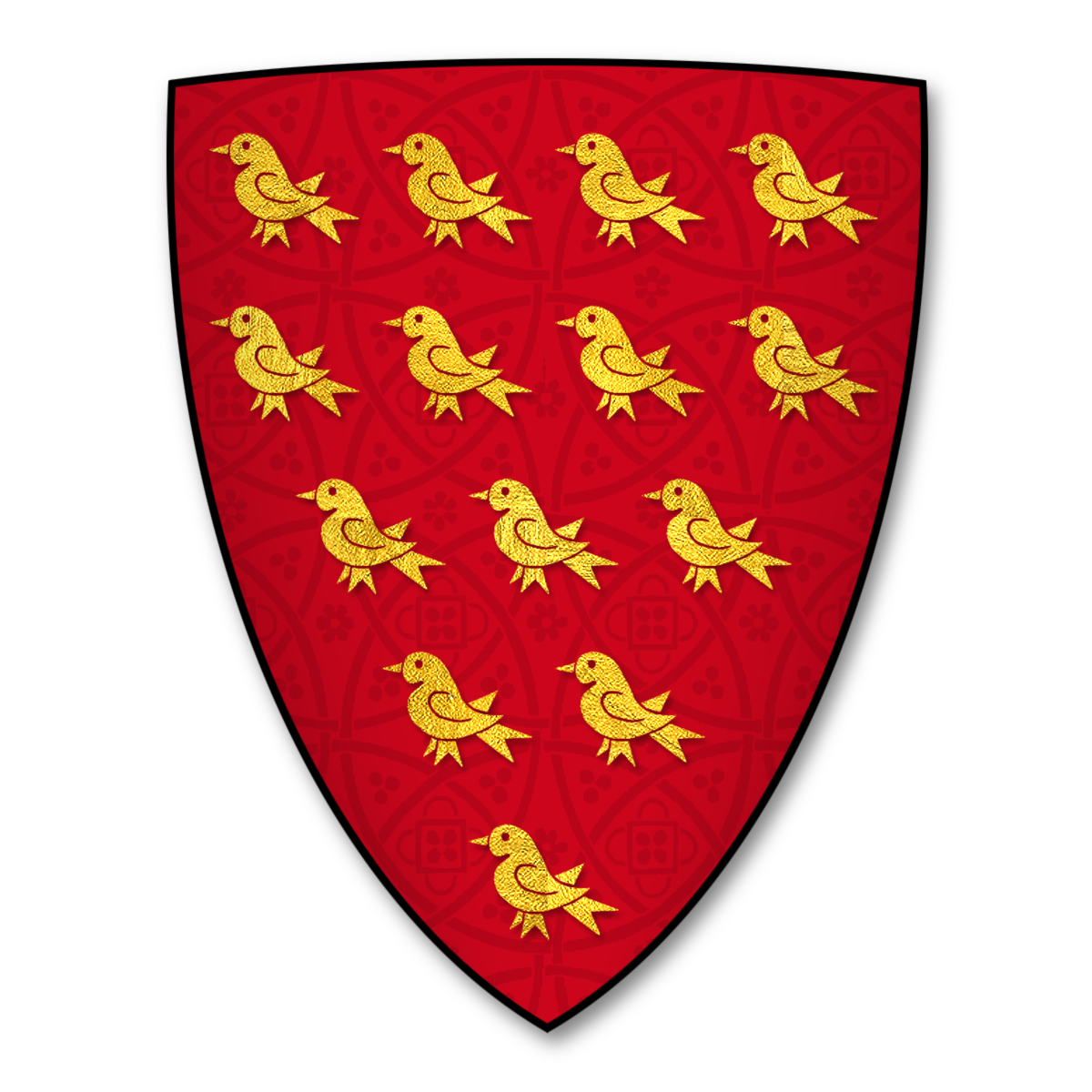
Coat of arms of William Touchet, Lord of Hainton, Gules, semée of marlets Or.

William Touchet of Hainton (Note: Surname also spelt Thochett, Tochelles, Tuchet. Thouchez and Tochelles.) (died 1322), Lord of Hainton, Barkwith and Southrey was an English noble. He fought in the wars in Scotland and fought on the baronial opposition side to King Edward II. He was executed in 1322.

== Biography ==
William was the son of Nicholas Tuchet and Alice de Kyme. He joined the baronial opposition under Thomas de Lancaster, Earl of Lancaster against King Edward II of England. William was married to Elena de Denardeston. He was executed by hanging in 1322. His brother Richard was his heir.
