= Grimblethorpe =

Hamlet in the East Lindsey district of Lincolnshire, England

Coordinates: 53.359568°N 0.143093°W

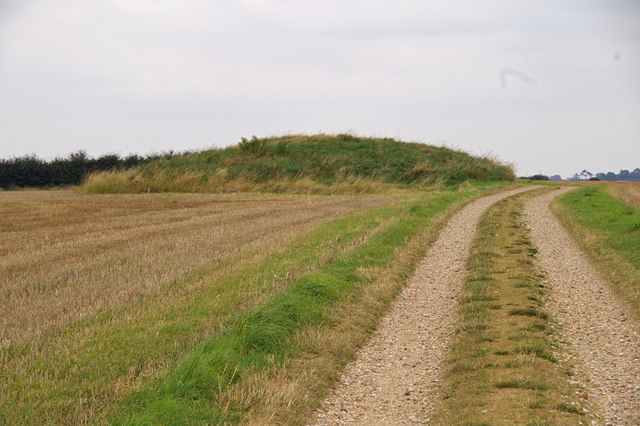
- Grim's Mound bowl barrow

- Location within Lincolnshire
- OS grid reference: TF236863
  - London: 130 mi (210 km) S
- Civil parish: Gayton le Wold
- District: East Lindsey
- Shire county: Lincolnshire
- Region: East Midlands
- Country: England
- Sovereign state: United Kingdom
- Post town: Market Rasen
- Postcode district: LN8
- Police: Lincolnshire
- Fire: Lincolnshire
- Ambulance: East Midlands
- UK Parliament: Louth and Horncastle

Grimblethorpe is a hamlet in the civil parish of Gayton le Wold, in the East Lindsey district of Lincolnshire, England. It is situated 6 miles (10 km) west from Louth and just north of the village of Gayton le Wold, on the A157 road.

Grimblethorpe was formerly an extra-parochial tract, in 1858 Grimblethorpe became a separate civil parish, on 1 April 1936 the parish was abolished and merged with Gayton le Wold. In 1931 the parish had a population of 14.

Grimblethorpe Hall is a Grade II* listed building dating from 1620, and built of red brick. It was possibly built for Sir Ralph Maddestone, who held Grimblethorpe at the end of the 16th century.

The hamlet is 650 yards (600 m) south of a deserted medieval village (DMV), not mentioned in the Domesday Book. Grim's Mound, 650 yards west from the DMV, is a Bronze Age bowl barrow, 62 feet (19 m) in diameter and 9 feet (2.7 m) high. It contains archaeological items, including human remains, and is an ancient scheduled monument.
