= Holy Rood Church, Market Rasen =

Coordinates: 53.3884°N 0.3416°W

Holy Rood, Market Rasen
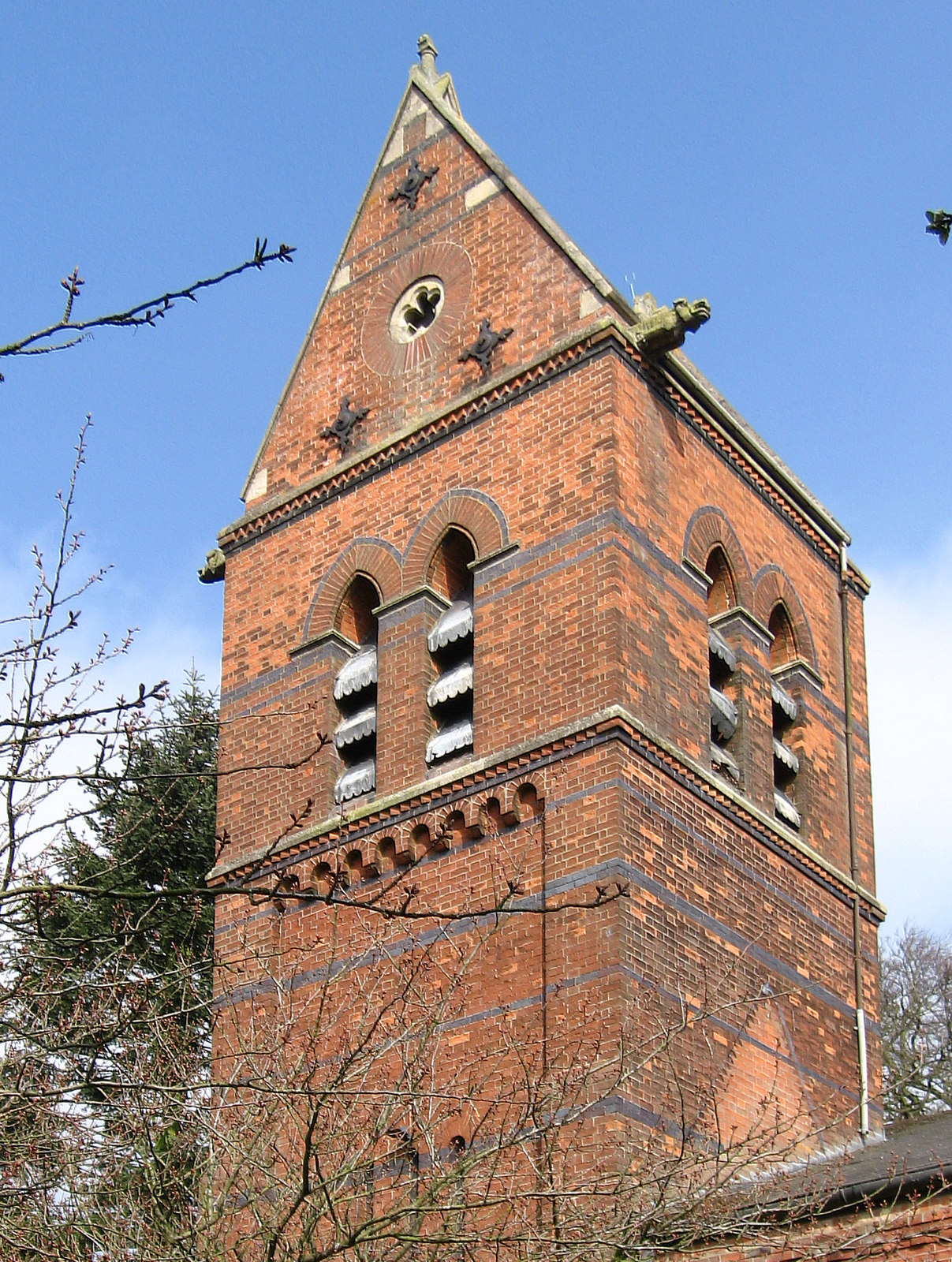
- Tower of Holy Rood viewed from the south
- Holy Rood, Market Rasen
- OS grid reference: TF 10393 89236
- Address: King Street, Market Rasen, Lincolnshire, LN8 3BB
- Country: England
- Denomination: Catholic Church
- Website: https://holyroodcatholicchurch.org.uk

History
- Status: Active
- Dedication: Holy Rood

Architecture
- Functional status: Parish Church
- Architect(s): Edward James Willson Hadfield and Son
- Years built: 1824

Administration
- Province: Westminster
- Diocese: Nottingham
- Deanery: Northern Lincolnshire
- Parish: Market Rasen

Clergy
- Bishop: Right Revd. Patrick McKinney
- Priest: Fr. David Palmer

Holy Rood Catholic Church is a Roman Catholic parish church located on King Street in Market Rasen, Lincolnshire, England. The church dates from the 19th century.

== History ==
In 1824, a chapel in the Classical Nonconformist style popular for Catholic chapels of the time, was built by Edward James Willson and was designed to seat 200 people. In 1867, Father Algernon Moore, a convert from Anglicanism, commissioned side aisles and a tower to be built in red brick, which was designed by Hadfield and Son, who were based in Sheffield. In the 1980s, roof decay led to a single span roof replacing the nave and aisle roofs.

== Notable people ==
Elton John's lyric writing partner and longtime friend Bernie Taupin was an altar boy and eventually married his first wife Maxine Feibelman there in 1971. John was the best man at the wedding.

== The Sixhills vestments ==
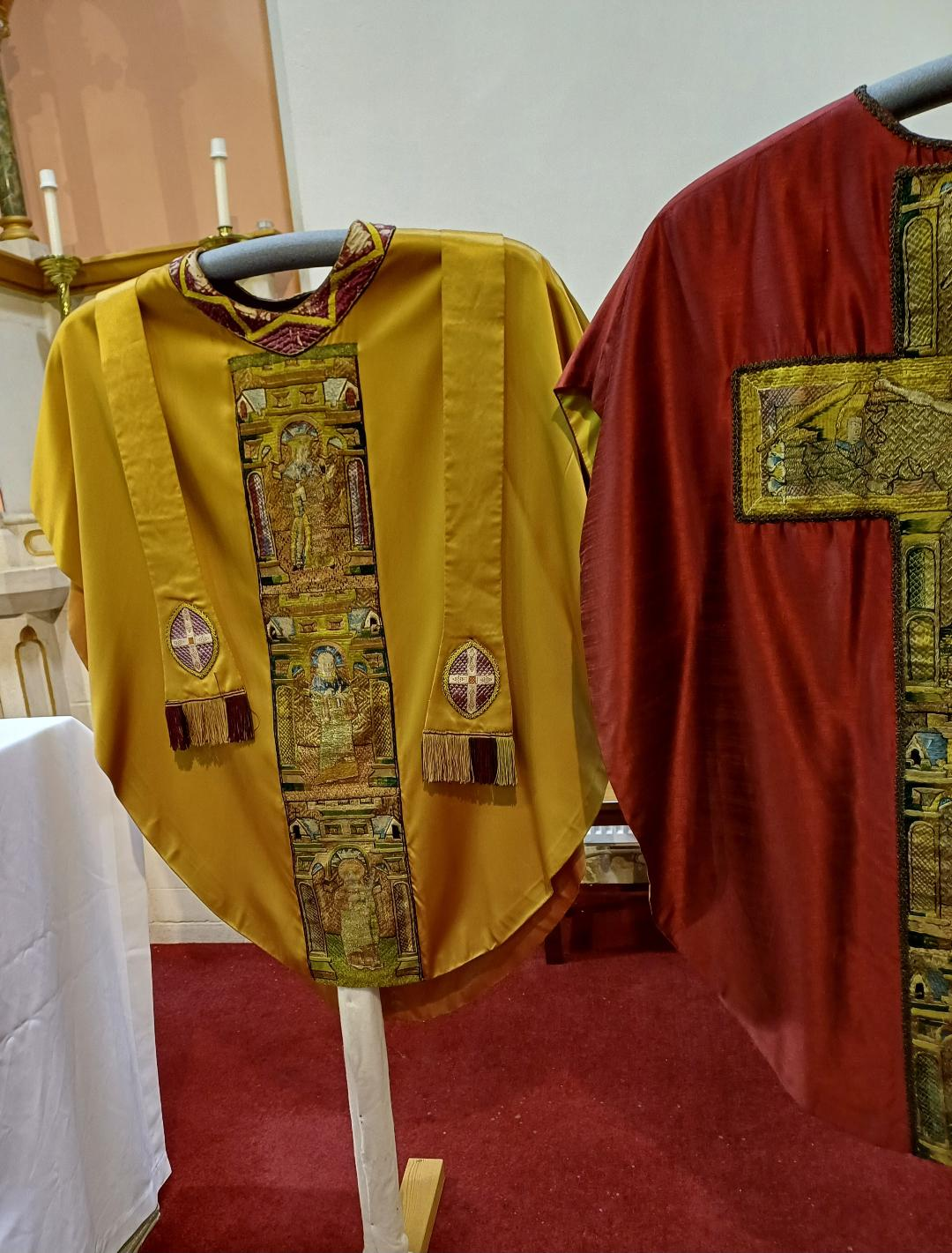
The Sixhills Chasubles

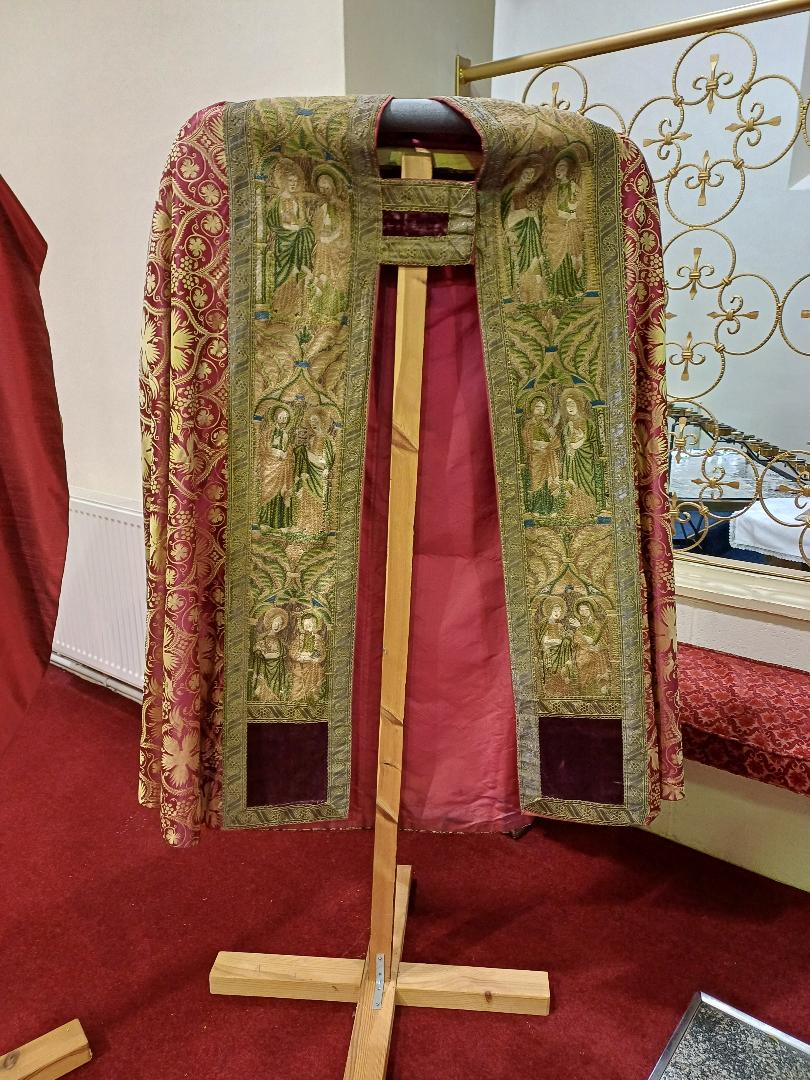
The Sixhills Cope

The church contains three medieval vestments. They are composed of medieval orphreys, mounted on a modern cope and two chasubles which came from the medieval Gilbertine priory at Sixhills. The chasubles date from 1490-1520 and the cope orphreys date from 1390-1420.
