= Piper Cars =

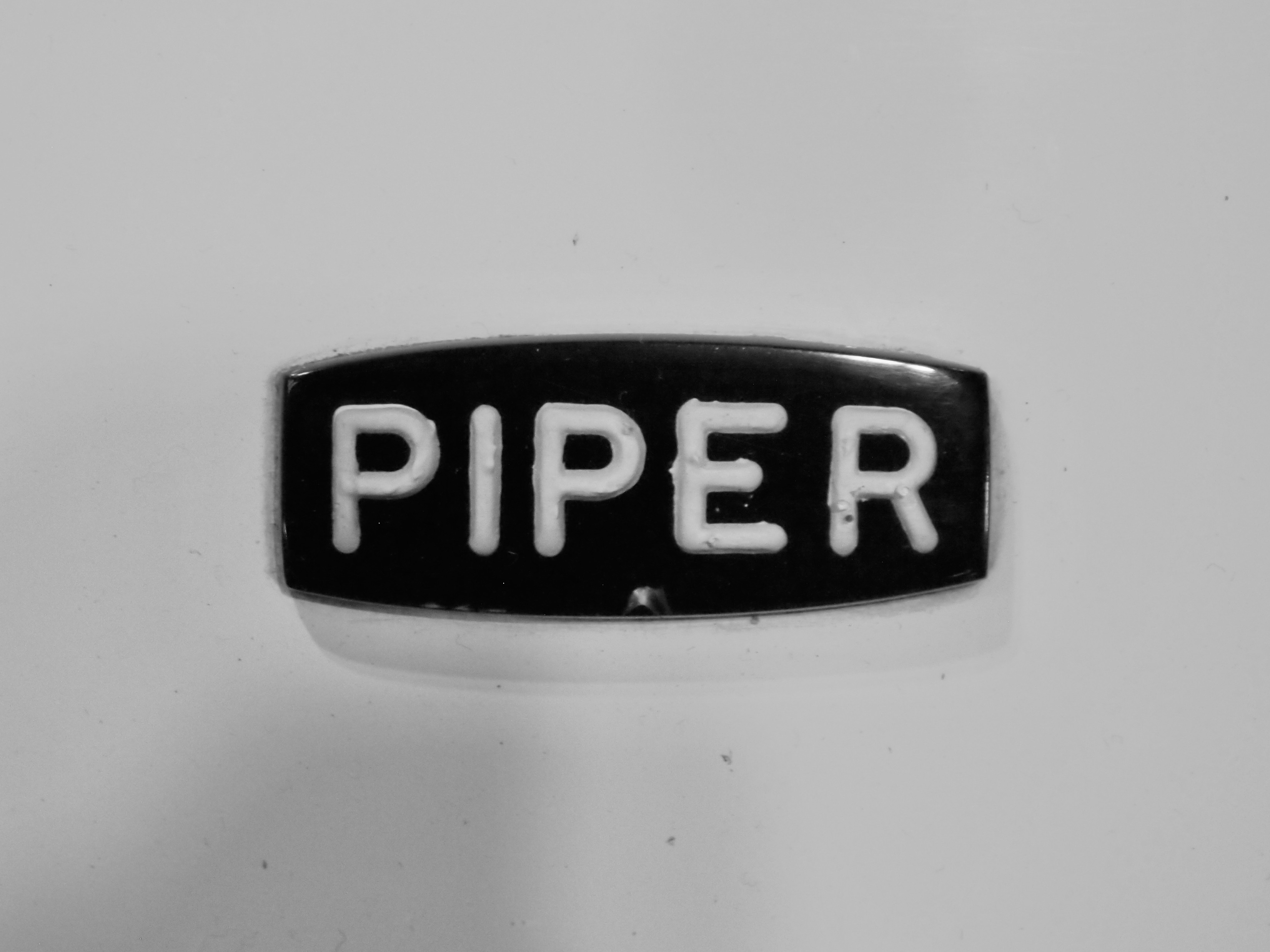
- Type: Private
- Industry: Automotive
- Fate: Dissolved
- Headquarters: United Kingdom
- Products: Cars

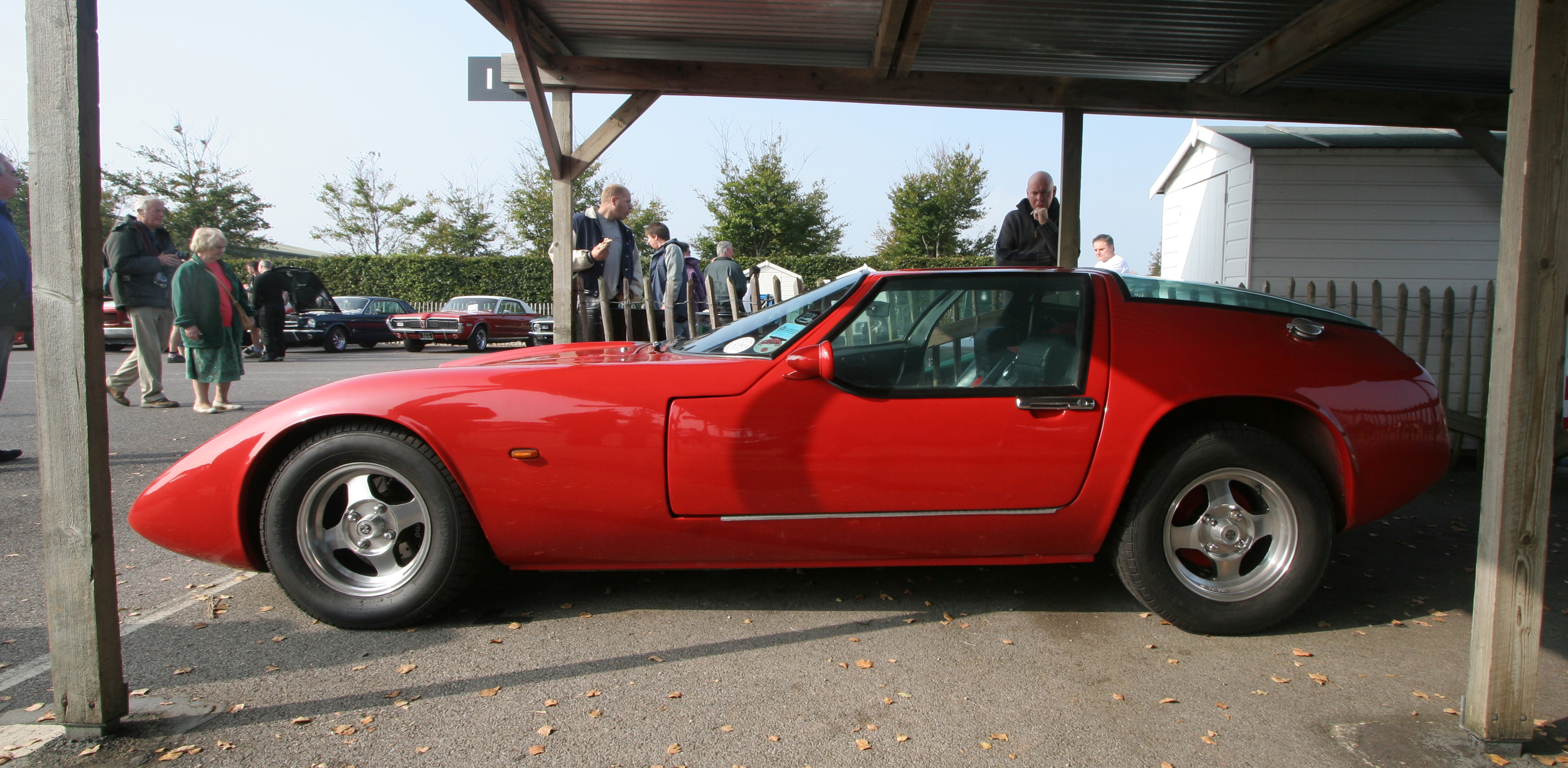
1972 Piper GT P2 at Goodwood Breakfast Club.

Piper Cars was a United Kingdom manufacturer of specialist sports cars (an associate company of a camshaft and engine tuning parts manufacturer of the same name).

== History ==
The company was initially based in Hayes, then in Kent, with production taking place from 1968 at Wokingham, Berkshire and from 1973 at South Willingham, Lincolnshire.

The first Piper GT road model to a design by Tony Hilder, was introduced at the January 1967 Racing Car Show and immediately afterwards entered production as a body/chassis unit for home completion. The front engine rear drive tubular steel chassis using Triumph Herald front suspension and Ford rear axle components could accommodate a variety of engines. Problems with the first few produced caused further production to be delayed until the following year when a substantially better developed version was introduced and became known as the GTT.

At the same time, a mid-engined Group 6 racing car, the GTR, was being developed but only a handful were produced before this was abandoned following the death of company owner Brian Sherwood in late 1969. The GTR was only 30 inches high, and had a drag co-efficient of only 0.28. Designer Hilder achieved this by moving all the mechanical parts, such as the water and oil radiators to the rear of the car. The car was entered for the 1969 Le Mans 24 Hours Race, but overheating problems and the failure of driver John Burton to record a qualifying time meant that the car did not start the race.

The death of Sherwood in a road accident brought the race project to an end. Two employees, Bill Atkinson and Tony Waller, took over the company renaming it Emmbrook Engineering, ceased all racing activity and focused on improving the road cars. In 1971 this led to a further revision known as the Piper P2 with many improvements to chassis, body and interior design. This model continued in production until the mid-1970s. Estimates of total Piper production vary from around 80 (Piper Sports and Racing Car Club) to somewhere over 100.

== See also ==
- List of car manufacturers of the United Kingdom
