= Panton, Lincolnshire =

Village in Lincolnshire, England

Coordinates: 53.29397°N 0.23834°W

Panton
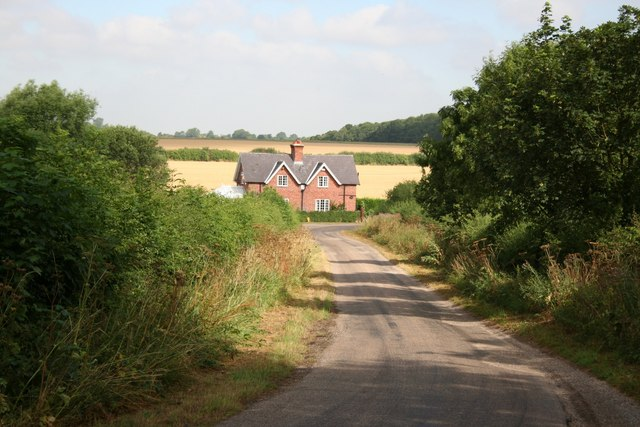
- Panton village

- Location within Lincolnshire
- OS grid reference: TF175788
  - London: 125 mi (201 km) S
- Civil parish: East Barkwith
- District: East Lindsey
- Shire county: Lincolnshire
- Region: East Midlands
- Country: England
- Sovereign state: United Kingdom
- Post town: MARKET RASEN
- Postcode district: LN8
- Police: Lincolnshire
- Fire: Lincolnshire
- Ambulance: East Midlands

Panton is a village in the civil parish of East Barkwith, in the East Lindsey of district, Lincolnshire, England. It is situated approximately 13 miles (20 km) north-east from Lincoln. In 1971 the parish had a population of 48. On 1 April 1987 the parish was abolished and merged with East Barkwith and Wragby.

Panton is listed in the 1086 Domesday Book with 32 households, 40 acres (0.16 km^{2}) of meadow and a church.

The former St Andrews church, built in the 18th century, is Grade II listed. It was restored in 1905, when the chancel arch was built, and again 1925–30 by Christopher Turnor. Several 18th-century gravestones survive. The church is now a dwelling.
