= Pelham's Pillar =

Coordinates: 53°31′04″N 0°17′56″W

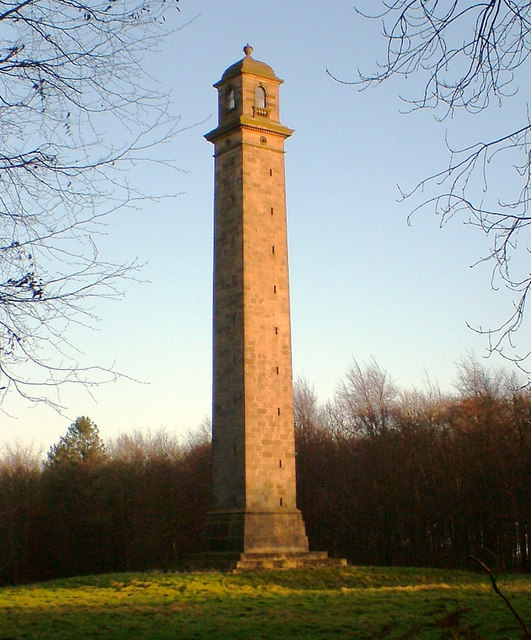
Pelham's Pillar

Pelham's Pillar is a 39-metre (128 ft) high monument and viewing tower in Cabourne, Lincolnshire, England. It is a Grade II listed building, located on the Brocklesby Park estate, part of the wider Yarborough estate.

The pillar was built to commemorate the landowner Charles Anderson-Pelham, 1st Earl of Yarborough (1781–1846). It also served as a viewing tower from which the Earls of Yarborough could survey their extensive estate.

== History ==
The monument commemorates the 1st Earl of Yarborough's dedication to forestry and agriculture. An inscription on the pillar records that he was responsible for the planting of 12,552,700 trees on the estate between 1787 and 1823.

Construction was managed across two generations of the family. The foundation stone was laid in 1840 by the 1st Earl's son, Charles Anderson-Pelham, 2nd Earl of Yarborough. Following the designs of the architect Edward James Willson of Lincoln, the tower was completed in 1849 under the supervision of his grandson, Charles Anderson-Pelham, 3rd Earl of Yarborough.

Prince Albert, the Prince Consort, visited the pillar in the year of its completion.

== Architecture ==
The structure is a square tower built from ashlar limestone. It features a brick interior staircase that ascends to a belvedere, or viewing room, at the summit.

== See also ==
- Brocklesby Park
- Charles Anderson-Pelham, 1st Earl of Yarborough
- Dunston Pillar
- Grade II listed building
- Grimsby Dock Tower
- Lincolnshire Wolds
