= West Barkwith =

Village and civil parish in the East Lindsey district of Lincolnshire, England

Coordinates: 53.309035°N 0.261834°W

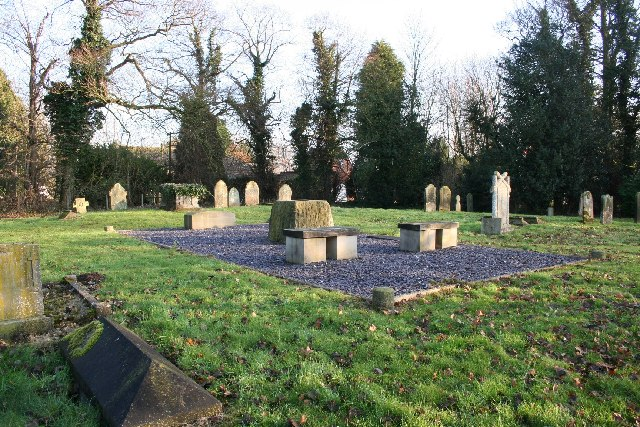
- All Saints church remains, West Barkwith

- Location within Lincolnshire
- OS grid reference: TF159805
  - London: 125 mi (201 km) S
- District: East Lindsey
- Shire county: Lincolnshire
- Region: East Midlands
- Country: England
- Sovereign state: United Kingdom
- Post town: Market Rasen
- Postcode district: LN8
- Police: Lincolnshire
- Fire: Lincolnshire
- Ambulance: East Midlands
- UK Parliament: Louth and Horncastle (UK Parliament constituency)

West Barkwith is a village and civil parish in the East Lindsey district of Lincolnshire, England. It is situated on the A157 road and about 2.5 miles (4.0 km) north-east from Wragby. The population is included in the civil parish of Benniworth.

West Barkwith and its neighbour East Barkwith were mentioned in Domesday Book of 1086 as one entity and consisted of 26 households and a church.

The parish church was medieval and dedicated to All Saints. The Diocese of Lincoln declared the church redundant in September 1981, and in February 1983 the church was demolished.
