= Gayton le Wold =

Village and civil parish in the East Lindsey district of Lincolnshire, England

Coordinates: 53.356806°N 0.142856°W

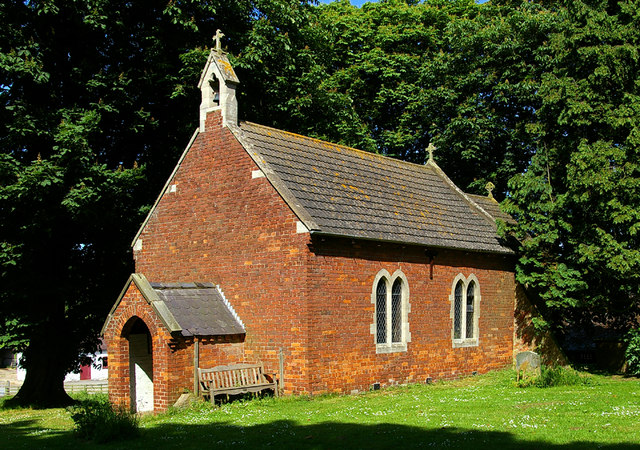
- Church of St Peter, Gayton le Wold

- Location within Lincolnshire
- OS grid reference: TF236860
  - London: 127 mi (204 km) S
- Civil parish: Gayton le Wold
- District: East Lindsey
- Shire county: Lincolnshire
- Region: East Midlands
- Country: England
- Sovereign state: United Kingdom
- Post town: LOUTH
- Postcode district: LN11
- Dialling code: 01507
- Police: Lincolnshire
- Fire: Lincolnshire
- Ambulance: East Midlands
- UK Parliament: Louth and Horncastle

Gayton le Wold is a village and civil parish in the East Lindsey district of Lincolnshire, England. It lies 6 miles (10 km) west from Louth, 3 miles (5 km) north from Donington on Bain, and to the south of the A157. The parish includes Biscathorpe 1 mile (1.6 km) to the south-west.

According to A Dictionary of British Place Names, Gayton derives from "a farmstead where goats are kept" being the Old Scandinavian 'geit' with 'tūn', the 'le' standing in for 'on the' wold(s). In the Domesday Book of 1086, Gayton le Wold is written as "Gedtune" or "Gettune". The manor was in the Louthesk Hundred of the South Riding of Lindsey. There were 22 households, four smallholders, 18 freemen, four ploughlands, one church, and a meadow of 50 acres (0.2 km^{2}). Before the Conquest lordship was held by Queen Edith, and after, King William who was also his own Tenant-in-chief.

Gayton le Wold is recorded in the 1872 White's Directory as a small scattered village, and a parish with a population of 115 in an area of 1,139 acres (4.6 km^{2}) "of fertile land". At the time the manor and Soke of Gayton, of which Grimoldsby (Grimoldby), Manby and the three parishes at Saltfleetby were also part, was a parcel of land held under the Honour of Richmond Fee, a Yorkshire feudal barony dating to the 11th century. The small brick building of St Peter's Church, rebuilt in 1775 with seating for sixty, consisted of a nave, chancel and bell turret. The incumbency was under a discharged rectory – ecclesiastical parish revenues (annates) kept within the parish – and was united with the parish of Biscathorpe. This joint benefice was in the gift of the Lord Chancellor (William Wood, 1st Baron Hatherley). The rector resided at Biscathorpe and was also the rector of Calcethorpe. Parish tithes - typically one-tenth of the produce or profits of the land given to the rector for his services - were commuted in 1841 under the 1836 Tithe Commutation Act, and substituted at Gayton with a £250 yearly rent-charge payment. People in Grimblethorpe, which was part of Gayton parish, attended Gayton church. The principal inhabitants of Gayton in 1872 were the residents of Gayton Grange, Gayton Manor, and the Manor House, all of whom were farmers, and a blacksmith.

Gayton le Wold Grade II listed Anglican parish church is dedicated to St Peter. Built of red brick in 1775, it was restored in 1888. Further Grade II listings are for c.1830 Gayton Manor House and c.1620 Grimblethorpe Hall, both with their associated buildings.

In the 19th century the Wesleyans and Free Methodists had chapels in the village.
