= Cabourne =

Hamlet and civil parish in Lincolnshire, England

Coordinates: 53.501115°N 0.283223°W

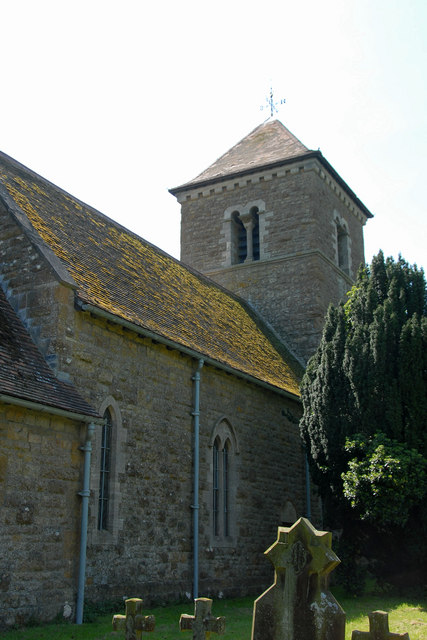
- St Nicholas' Church, Cabourne

- Location within Lincolnshire
- Population: 81 (2021 census)
- OS grid reference: TA139018
  - London: 135 mi (217 km) S
- Civil parish: Cabourne
- District: West Lindsey
- Shire county: Lincolnshire
- Region: East Midlands
- Country: England
- Sovereign state: United Kingdom
- Post town: Market Rasen
- Postcode district: LN7
- Police: Lincolnshire
- Fire: Lincolnshire
- Ambulance: East Midlands

Cabourne is a hamlet and civil parish in the West Lindsey district of Lincolnshire, England. It is situated on the A46 road, and just over 1 mile (1.6 km) east from the town of Caistor. In 2021 the parish had a population of 81.

== Etymology ==
The village's name is first attested in Domesday Book of 1086 as Caburne. The first element comes from Old English cā "jackdaw" and the second from Old English burna "stream". Thus the name once meant "jackdaw stream".

== Historic architecture ==
The parish church is a Grade II* listed building dedicated to Saint Nicholas. The tower dates from the 11th century, the rest of the church being 15th-century, with a restoration in 1872. During restoration a Norman font was unearthed below the floor. A late 11th- or 12th-century grave marker lies against the east wall of the chancel.

An 1830 Grade II listed octagonal pump house exists here.

Pelham's Pillar is a 128 ft high Grade II listed tower, dating from 1840 to 1849 by E. J. Willson. A plaque above the door commemorates Charles Anderson Pelham, Lord Yarborough who planted 12,532,700 trees in Cabourne High Wood between 1787 and 1828. The column was begun by Pelham's son in 1840, and completed by his grandson in 1849.
