= Biscathorpe =

Ecclesiastical parish and deserted medieval village

Coordinates: 53.347155°N 0.159355°W

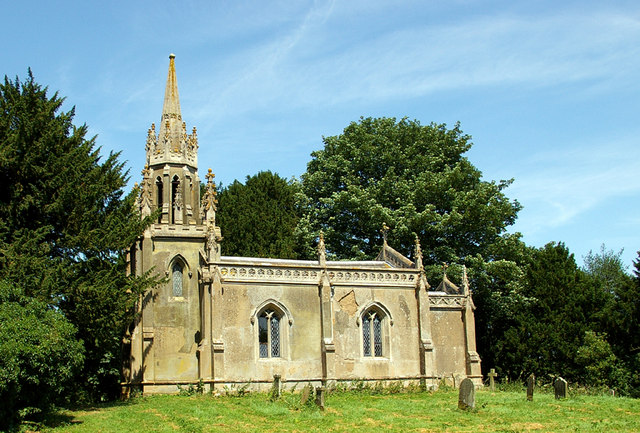
- Church of St Helen, Biscathorpe

- Location within Lincolnshire
- OS grid reference: TF226849
  - London: 125 mi (201 km) S
- Civil parish: Gayton le Wold
- District: East Lindsey
- Shire county: Lincolnshire
- Region: East Midlands
- Country: England
- Sovereign state: United Kingdom
- Post town: LOUTH
- Postcode district: LN11
- Dialling code: 01507
- Police: Lincolnshire
- Fire: Lincolnshire
- Ambulance: East Midlands
- UK Parliament: Louth and Horncastle

Biscathorpe is an ecclesiastical parish, deserted medieval village and former civil parish, now in the parish of Gayton le Wold, in the East Lindsey district of Lincolnshire, England, on the River Bain, 1 mile (1.6 km) south-west of Gayton le Wold, 6.5 miles (10.5 km) west of Louth, and to the south of the A157. It is a Conservation Area managed by DEFRA, and is traversed by the Viking Way. In 1931 the parish had a population of 26. On 1 April 1936 the civil parish was abolished and merged with Gayton le Wold.

Biscathorpe has three buildings adjacent to the site of the medieval village, Biscathorpe House, Church Cottage, converted to luxury holiday accommodation in 2013 and the Grade II* listed Anglican parish church dedicated to St Helen. The church was built in the early 1840s, rebuilt in 1850, and restored in 1913.

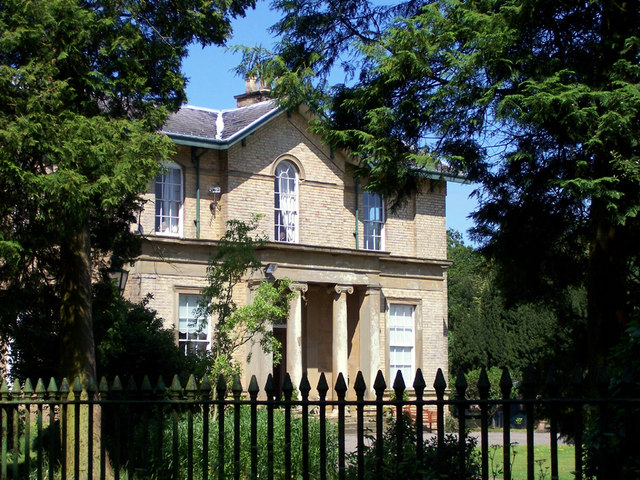
Biscathorpe House

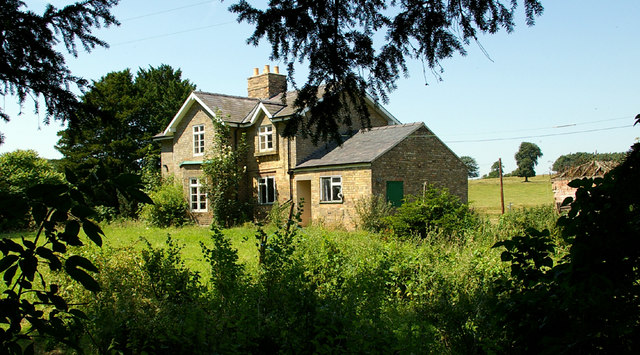
Church Cottage

== Oil and Gas exploration ==
A Planning Application was submitted by Egdon Resources Plc in August 2013 to drill an oil well to the east of the Biscathorpe fords. Egdon intends to produce conventional oil from the Upper Carboniferous.
