= Hainton =

Village and civil parish in the East Lindsey district of Lincolnshire, England

Coordinates: 53.342923°N 0.223086°W

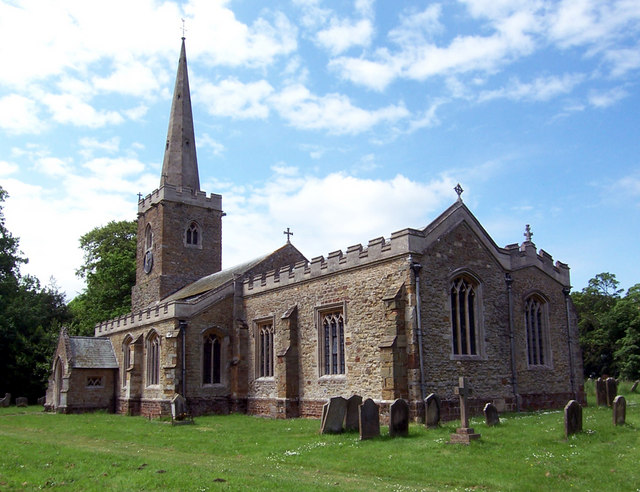
- St Mary's Church, Hainton

- Location within Lincolnshire
- Population: 114 (2011)
- OS grid reference: TF183843
  - London: 125 mi (201 km) S
- District: East Lindsey
- Shire county: Lincolnshire
- Region: East Midlands
- Country: England
- Sovereign state: United Kingdom
- Post town: Market Rasen
- Postcode district: LN8
- Police: Lincolnshire
- Fire: Lincolnshire
- Ambulance: East Midlands
- UK Parliament: Louth and Horncastle

Hainton is a village and civil parish in the East Lindsey district of Lincolnshire, England. It is situated on the A157 road, 10 miles (16 km) west from Louth and 5 miles (8 km) south-east from Market Rasen.

Hainton is listed in the Domesday Book of 1086 as "Haintone", with 9 villagers, 2 smallholders, 1 freeman, and 100 acres (0.4 km^{2}) of meadow, and given over to Ilbert of Lacy as Lord of the manor.

The village is the site of a medieval settlement, with evidence of earthworks indicating a ridge and furrow field system and crofts.

In 1885 Kelly's Directory recorded a now listed school built by G. F. Heneage in 1846. Agricultural production in the 2,306-acre (9.33 km^{2}) parish was chiefly wheat, barley, oats and turnips.

== Church ==
Hainton Grade I listed Anglican church is dedicated to St Mary. A parish church originating in the 11th century, with changes in the 13th and refurbishment in the 14th, it was possibly re-modelled by Capability Brown in 1763. It was restored by Edward James Willson in 1848 who retained early Norman lower stages of the tower and Early English nave arcades.

Cox states: "The church (St Mary) is of much interest, especially for its monuments". Monuments and effigies to the Heneage family date back to the 15th century, and are set within the north chapel off the chancel.

The rectory at Hainton was once the home of the Tudor composer William Byrd; in 1562/3, the lease of the rectory was granted by the Dean and Chapter of Lincoln Cathedral to Byrd for a period of 41 years.

== Hainton Hall ==
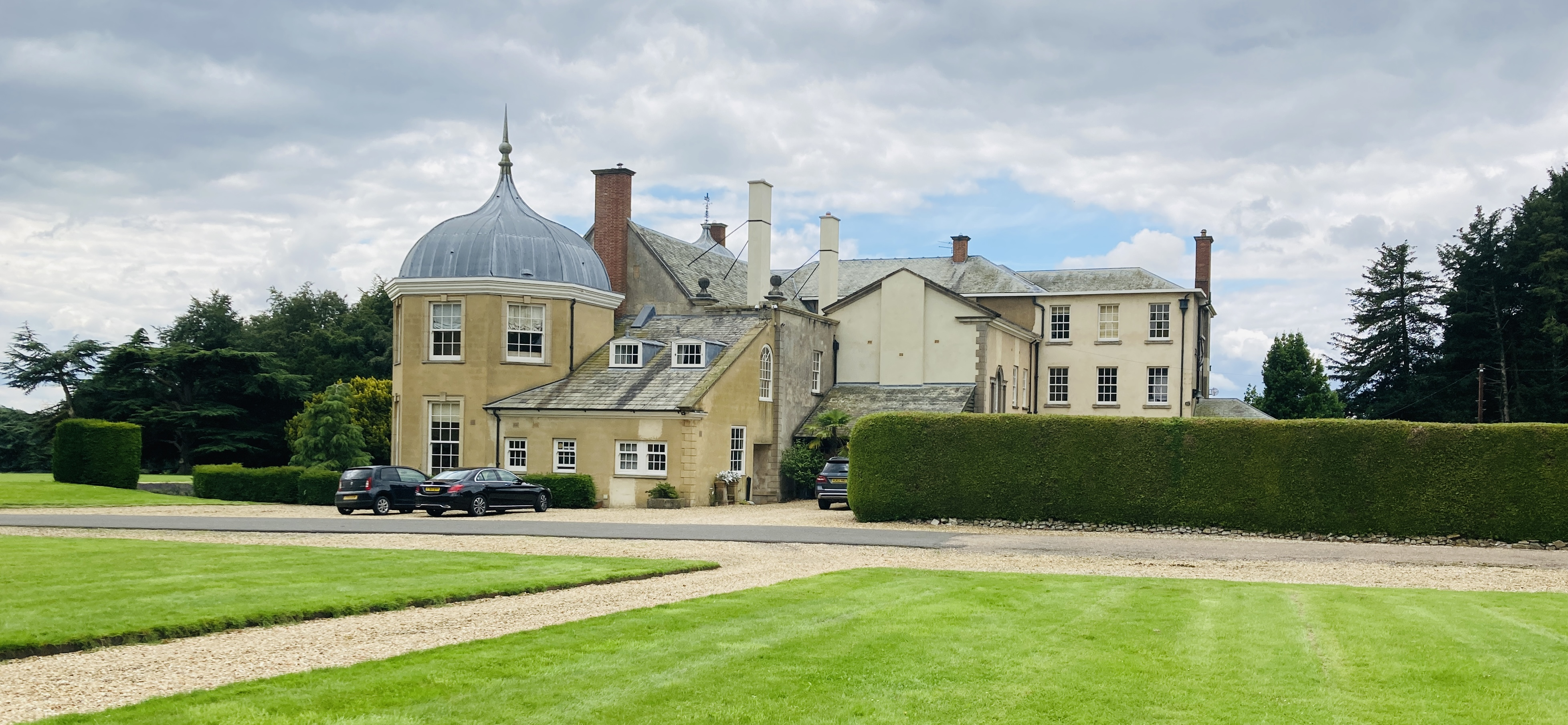
Hainton Hall from the side in 2023

Hainton Hall has been the seat of the Heneage family since the reign of Henry III. It is set in a park of 145 acres (0.59 km^{2}), landscaped by Capability Brown about 1763. The present hall was built in 1638 with later additions, and a rebuilding and raising of the west wing, and the facing of the whole house in stucco, by Peter Atkinson in 1809. A porch was added by William Burn in 1875. Behind the south front are Georgian interiors. The main interior hall, of two-story height with staircase to an upper landing, has plasterwork in Rococo style. The Morning Room has ceiling patterns perhaps by James Gibbs.

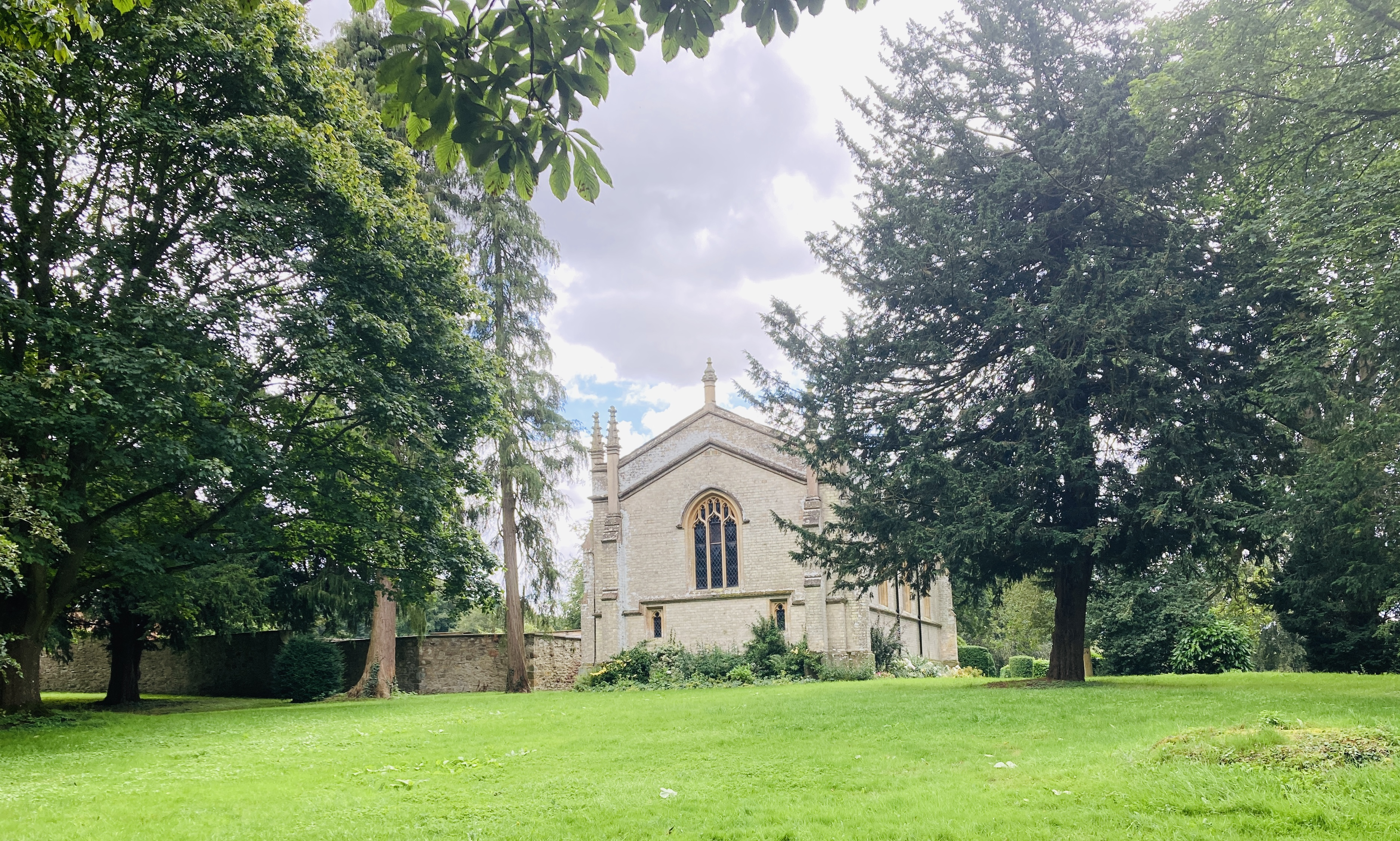
The Catholic chapel of 1836 was designed by Edward James Willson

In 1838 Thomas Moule noted ancestral family portraits at the Hall, particularly one of Sir Thomas Heneage, Vice-Chamberlain of the Household and Chancellor of the Duchy of Lancaster to Queen Elizabeth.

In the estate grounds is the Roman Catholic chapel of St Francis De Sales, now Grade II listed, designed by Willson. Erected in 1836 by G. H. Heneage, it was dedicated to Heneage's late wife.

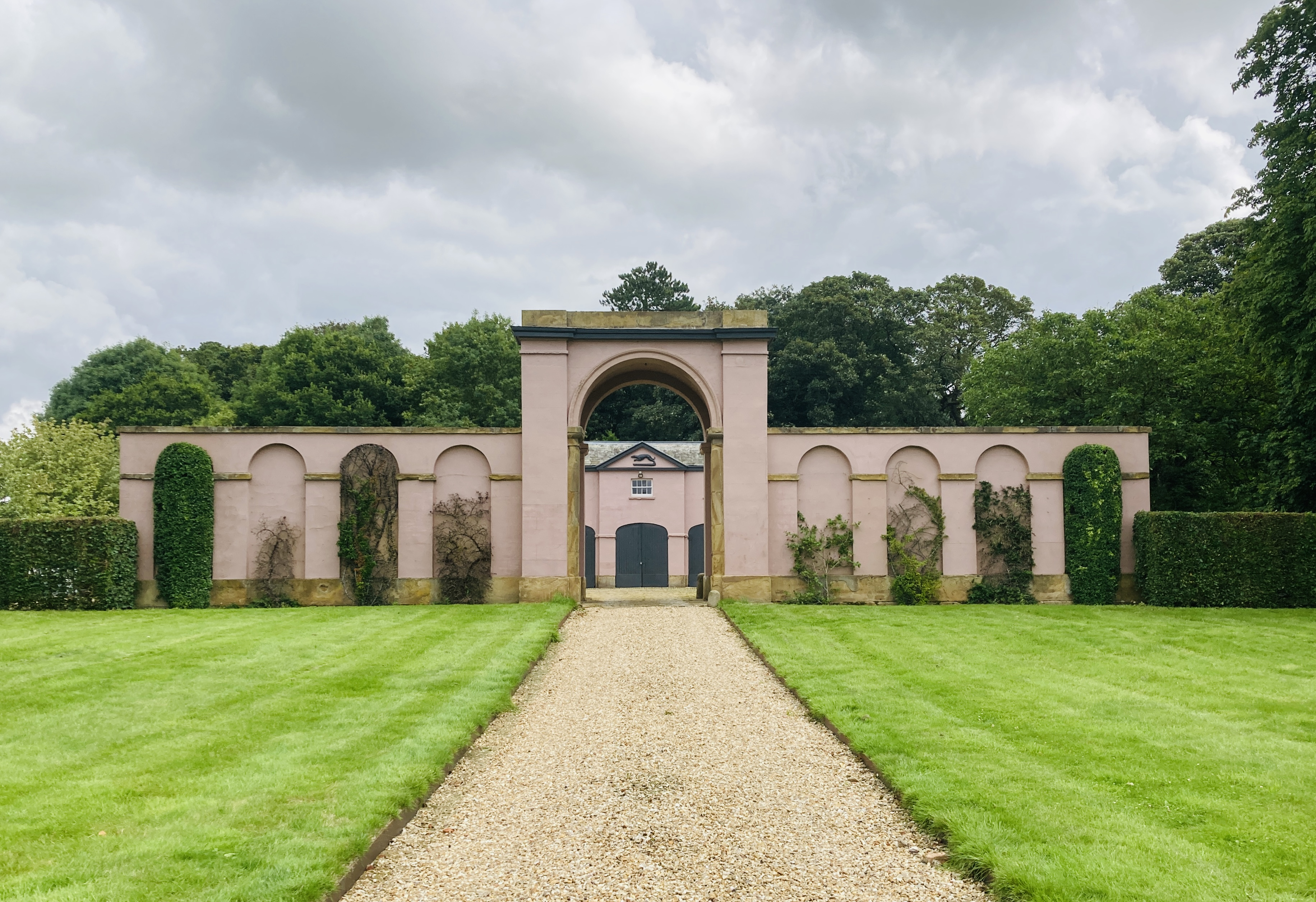
The stable block of 1807

The estate holds a listed 1807 stuccoed stable block, perhaps the work of Atkinson, and several 1836 estate cottages, the work of William Danby.

The Heneage family were raised to the Baronetcy in 1896. In 1967, on the death of Thomas Robert Heneage, the title became extinct.

== Amenities ==
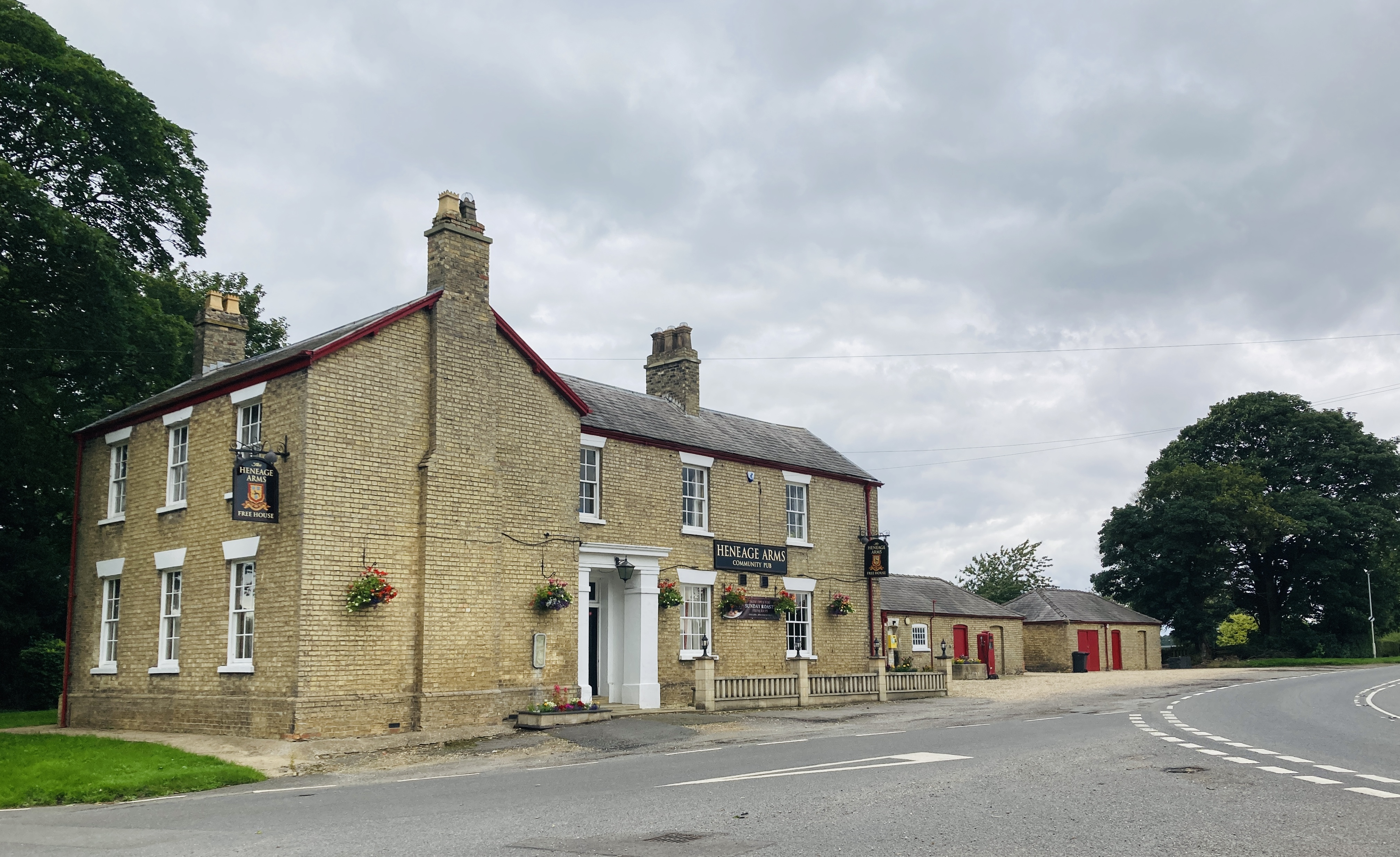
The Heneage Arms in 2023

Hainton's public house is the Heneage Arms.
