= Benniworth =

Coordinates: 53.321030°N 0.190075°W

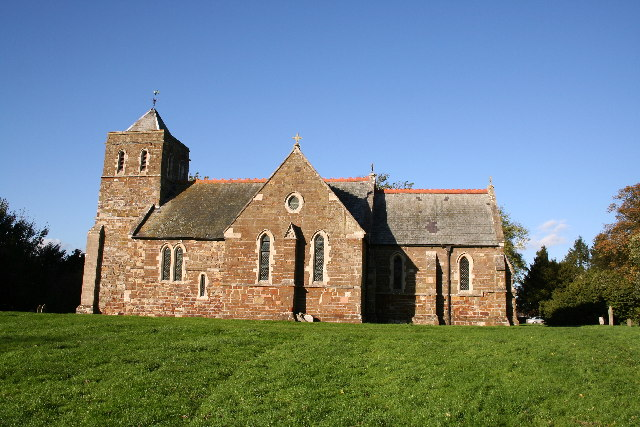
- Church of St Julian, Benniworth

- Location within Lincolnshire
- Population: 193 (2011)
- OS grid reference: TF206819
  - London: 125 mi (201 km) S
- District: East Lindsey
- Shire county: Lincolnshire
- Region: East Midlands
- Country: England
- Sovereign state: United Kingdom
- Post town: Market Rasen
- Postcode district: LN8
- Police: Lincolnshire
- Fire: Lincolnshire
- Ambulance: East Midlands
- UK Parliament: Louth and Horncastle

Benniworth is a village and civil parish in the East Lindsey district of Lincolnshire, England. The village is situated just west of the B1225 road, and 8 miles (13 km) west from Louth.

According to the 2001 Census, the village had a population of 175, increasing to 193 (including West Barkwith) at the 2011 Census.

Benniworth Grade II listed Anglican parish church is dedicated to St Julian. The church is cruciform in plan with a conical roofed tower. Restoration by James Fowler was undertaken in 1875 when the transepts and chancel were rebuilt. The Norman west doorway and south side of the nave remains, with the font being reconstructed from Norman fragments.

== History ==
Benniworth ("Beningvrde"), has two entries in the Domesday Book. Benniworth was a relatively large place at that time, with a total of 54 households (39 within the Wraggoe hundred and 15 within the lands of the Archbishop). In the early post-conquest period, land value rose from £5.5 in 1066 to £8.5 in 1086.

George Clayton Tennyson (1778–1831), the father of Alfred, Lord Tennyson, was rector of the Church of St Julian in Benniworth (1802–1831).
