= East Barkwith =

Village and civil parish in the East Lindsey district of Lincolnshire, England

Coordinates: 53.316842°N 0.24776°W

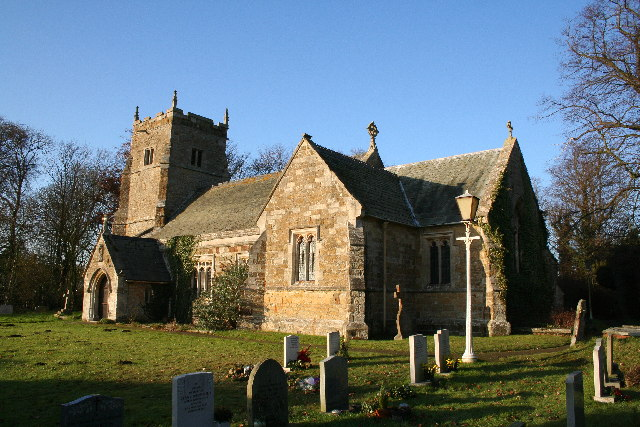
- St Mary's Church, East Barkwith

- Location within Lincolnshire
- Population: 373 (Including Panton. 2011)
- OS grid reference: TF168814
  - London: 125 mi (201 km) S
- District: East Lindsey
- Shire county: Lincolnshire
- Region: East Midlands
- Country: England
- Sovereign state: United Kingdom
- Post town: Market Rasen
- Postcode district: LN8
- Police: Lincolnshire
- Fire: Lincolnshire
- Ambulance: East Midlands
- UK Parliament: Gainsborough

East Barkwith is a village and civil parish in the East Lindsey district of Lincolnshire, England. It is situated on the A157, and approximately 13 miles (21 km) north-east from the city of Lincoln,

The parish church is dedicated to Saint Mary and is a Grade II* listed building dating from the early 12th century, with later restorations, and is built of greenstone, limestone and ironstone.

There was a school here which opened in January 1873 as a National School. and closed in April 1987 as East Barkwith CE School.

The village was served by East Barkwith railway station which opened in 1876 and closed in 1958.

East Barkwith civil parish includes the village of Panton. It also includes the deserted medieval village (DMV), of Hardwick, which is listed in the Domesday Book of 1086.
