= Alan de Neville =

Alan de Neville may refer to:

- Alan de Neville (landholder) (fl. 1168), English landowner in Lincolnshire
- Alan de Neville (forester) (died c. 1176), English nobleman and administrator
