= Burreth, Lincolnshire =

Now-deserted village in Lincolnshire

Coordinates: 53°12′42″N 0°16′32″W

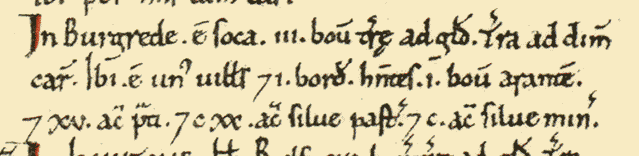
Burreth's entry in the Domesday Book.

Burreth (also occasionally Burgrede) is a now-deserted village in Lincolnshire.

== Medieval village ==
In the late 13th century, the manor of Burreth was held by Robert de Neville, who held it two-thirds from the Earl of Lincoln and one-third from the Bishop of Lincoln. For the purposes of the 1377 poll tax, the village possessed 74 taxable individuals, and it paid £1 4s 8d. Burreth, in what is now the district of East Lindsey in Lincolnshire, was recorded in the Domesday Book and last recorded as extant in 1381. Although the village itself is extinct, its eponymous parish is conterminous with Tupholme. Burreth had a village church dedicated to St Peter and was under the auspices of Tupholme Abbey; the last recorded priest died in 1349 during the Black Death. (Note: Although the Black Death is often considered responsible for wiping out medieval villages in England, most, in fact, were damaged by the population loss but not deserted until the 15th century, when enclosures and new farming methods encouraged population movement.)

== Remains ==
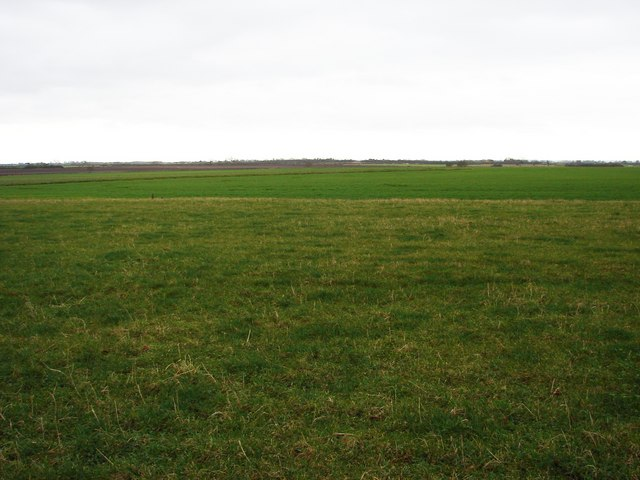
Distant right lies the site of the medieval village of Burreth

Earthworks and crop marks are visible from aerial photography, as well as a moat, a mound that local legend has as the site of the church, and what Historic England describes as "a confused area to the southeast, probably house steadings but mutilated by surface quarrying". Original stone, pottery and tile of the buildings have been found, including the possible outline of the church, 16 metres (52 ft) by 9 metres (30 ft) Burreth was home to at least one hermit in the 13th century.

=== Archaeological studies ===
The most recent archaeological survey to have been carried out was in 1964, although since then much further ploughing has reduced the searchable area of the village.

== See also ==
- List of lost settlements in the United Kingdom
