= Old King's Head, Kirton =

Old King's Head
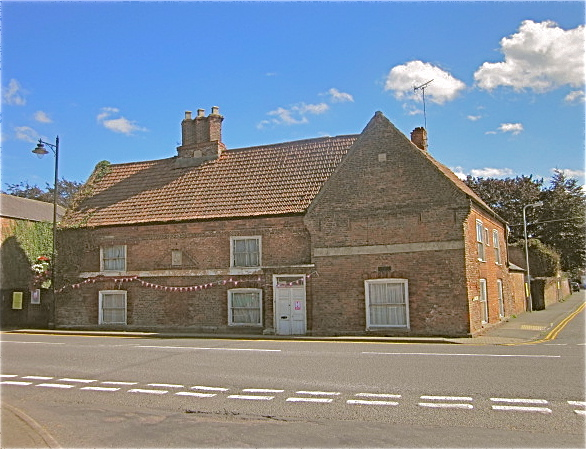
- The Old King's Head, Kirton, Lincolnshire

- Location within Lincolnshire
- 52.927740°N 0.059105°W
- Location: The Old King's Head, Kirton in Holland, near Boston, Lincolnshire
- OS grid reference: TF3054038472

History
- Built: Late 16th century (datestone 1599).
- Rebuilt: Late 17th century (datestone 1661)

Site notes
- Architectural styles: Elizabethan and later Fen Artisan Style
- Restored: 2021

Listed Building – Grade II
- Designated: 19 November 1951
- Reference no.: 1062023

The Old King's Head, Kirton in Holland, near Boston in Lincolnshire, England is a former public house. The earlier part of it was built at the end of the 16th century and was given major alterations in 1661 in Artisan Mannerist Style. It is red brick in English Bond with recent tiles over a thatched roof. It became a domestic residence in the 1960s and in 2016 it was purchased by Heritage Lincolnshire for restoration.

It opened as a cafe and bed & breakfast on 1 October 2021.

== Architecture ==
The term 'Artisan Mannerist Architecture' was first used by Sir John Summerson in 1953 to describe the building style that developed after the Renaissance in Britain when artisan craftsmen such as masons and bricklayers took on the role of architects. The style was largely derived from Dutch architecture. Sir John's study was largely restricted to larger stone buildings, but John Harris who worked with Sir Nicholas Pevsner on the Lincolnshire volume of Buildings of England adopted the terminology Fen Artisan Style and described the Old Kings Head as an example of Fenland Artisan Mannerism. Harris went on to describe other examples of similar buildings. These include the nearby Blossom's Hall also in Kirton, the Elizabethan House and The Hall at Coningsby, the Porch House Sibsey the Church House at Boston and the Bulls Neck and adjacent farm near Holbeach. The style is probably best exemplified by the manor house at Aslackby, near Bourne. Here the house has raised brickwork decoration and elaborate string courses, while the square chimney stacks are angled in a line in a similar fashion to those on the Old Kings Head. The style contrasts with the Artisan brick mannerism of North Lincolnshire and East Yorkshire which has been studied by Neave and is often associated with the work of Hull architect William Catlyn. Neave derives this architectural style from the brick architecture of the Netherlands. This origin is also likely to be true for Fenland Artisan Mannerism where houses often also have Dutch gables

== Gallery ==
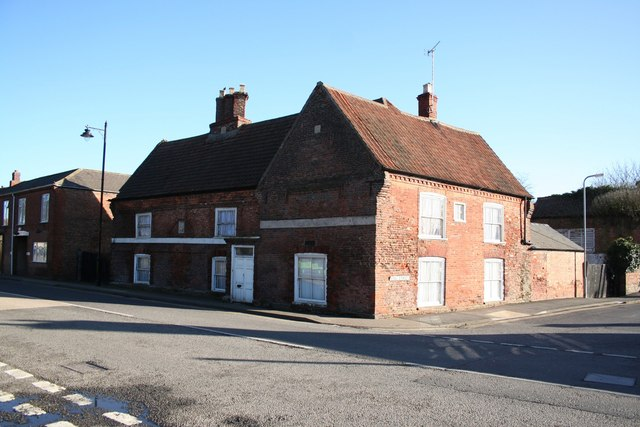
Old King's Head

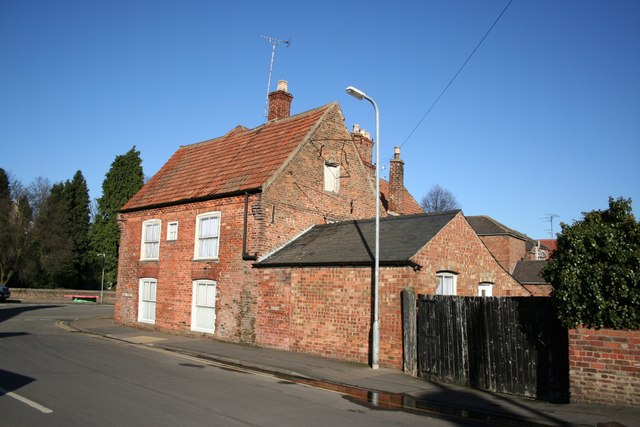
Old King's Head from King's street.

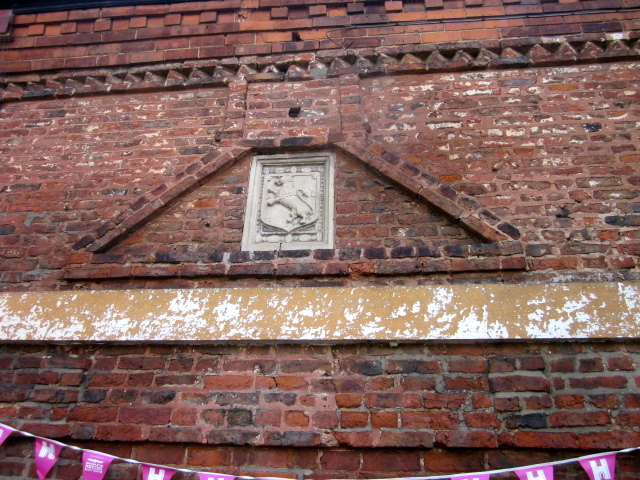
The Old King's Head. Mannerist brick decoration over earlier doorway

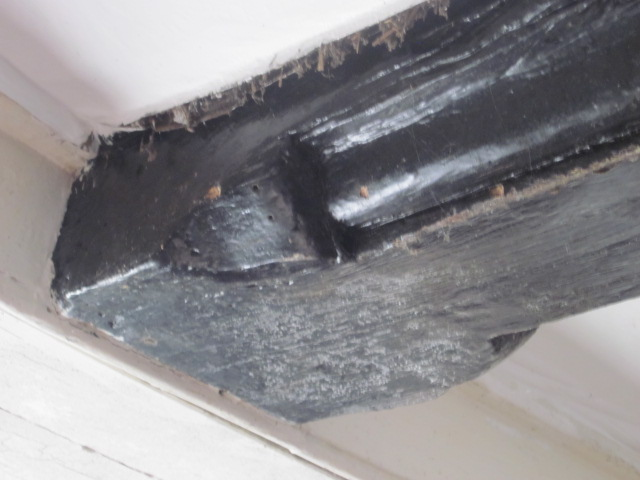
The Old King's Head. Late 16th-century moulded beam.

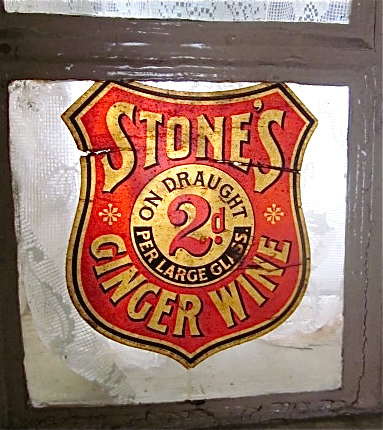
Advertisement for Stone's Ginger wine, c.1900

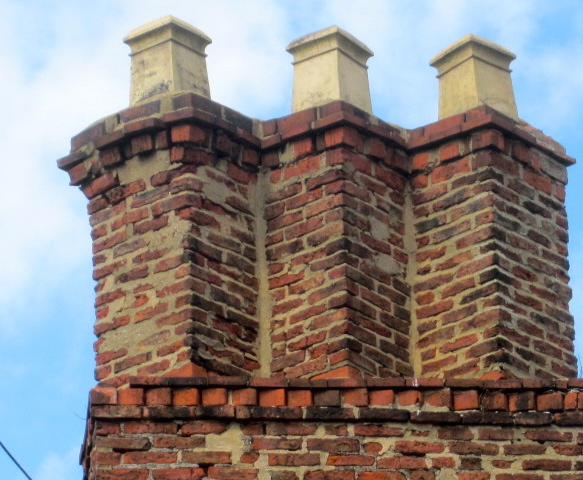
The Old King's Head. 17th-century chimney stacks.

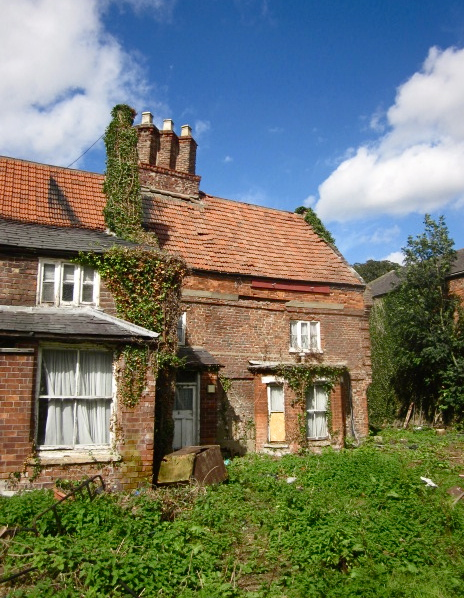
Rear of the Old King's Head. shows brick rustication on corner.

== Literature ==
- Antram N (revised), Pevsner N & Harris J, (1989), The Buildings of England: Lincolnshire, Yale University Press. pp. 979
- Barley M (1990) The Buildings of the Countryside 1500–1750, Vol 5, of Chapters from the Agrarian History of England and Wales (ed. Thirsk J.) Cambridge University Press, pp 1–173.
- Neave D. (1996) Artisan Mannerism in North Lincolnshire and East Yorkshire: The work of William Catlyn (1628-1709) of Hull in Sturman C (ed) Lincolnshire Peoples and Places: Essays in Memory of Terence R. Leach (1937-1994), pp. 18–25.
- Summerson Sir J 1953, Architecture in Britain 1530–1830, 97-105
