= Catlyn =

Catlyn is a surname. Notable people with the surname include:

- Richard Catlyn (by 1520–1556), English politician
- Robert Catlyn (died 1574), English judge
- William Catlyn (1628–1709), English architect
