= Heritage Lincolnshire =

The Heritage Trust of Lincolnshire or Heritage Lincolnshire in the shortened form of its name, is an independent charitable trust working to preserve, protect, promote and present Lincolnshire's heritage for the benefit of local people and visitors. It is based at the Old School in Heckington near Sleaford. It was established in the September 1988 on the initiative of Lincolnshire County Council. It became a registered charity on 9 January 1991, at the same time gaining independence from the county council and merging with the established Trust for Lincolnshire Archaeology. Since 1994 the charity's archaeological division has traded as Archaeological Project Services, or APS.

== Historic sites ==
Heritage Lincolnshire cares for six historic sites in the county, as well as its headquarters at the Old School in Heckington, Mill Cottage at Little Steeping and its building preservation projects, such as the Old King's Head.

- Bolingbroke Castle near Spilsby. The moated ruins of a thirteenth-century castle built by Ranulf, Earl of Chester that was the birthplace of the future Henry IV of England. Heritage Lincolnshire has managed the site on behalf of English Heritage since 1995, through a local management agreement.
- Holbeach Royal Observer Corps Monitoring Post. An underground post built in 1964 and used by local volunteers from the Royal Observer Corps to monitor in case of nuclear attack. The post was donated to the Trust by the landowner in 2000 after it had been decommissioned in 1991, following the end of the Cold War.
- Hussey Tower, Boston. The ruined shell of a three-storey brick tower house that was once part of a larger manorial complex built in the 1460s by Richard Benyngton, who was collector of customs and excise for the wealthy port of Boston. Its name today comes from a later owner, Sir John Hussey, upon whose execution in 1536 following the Lincolnshire Rising it passed to its present owners Boston Corporation, upon whose behalf Heritage Lincolnshire has managed the site since 1997.
- Tattershall College. The remains of a fifteenth-century brick grammar school built by Ralph, Lord Cromwell for the purpose of providing a free education to the sons of his tenants and the choristers of the college, which was centred on the nearby Collegiate Church of Holy Trinity. Heritage Lincolnshire has managed the site on behalf of English Heritage since 1995.
- Tupholme Abbey, near Bardney. The site and standing ruins of a Premonstratensian abbey near the River Witham, founded between 1155 and 1165 by Gilbert and Alan de Neville. The Trust purchased the site in 1988.

Heritage Lincolnshire previously managed Temple Bruer Preceptory which is now in the guardianship of Lincolnshire County Council.

== The Old King's Head, Kirton ==
A project currently being undertaken by Heritage Lincolnshire is the restoration of the Old King's Head, Kirton near Boston, Lincolnshire a former public house. The earlier part of it was built at the end of the sixteenth century and was given major alterations in 1661 in Artisan Mannerist Style. It is red brick in English Bond with recent tiles over a thatched roof. It became a domestic residence in the 1960s and in 2016 it was purchased by Heritage Lincolnshire for restoration. It opened as a bed and breakfast and cafe on 1 October 2021.

== See also ==
- Lincolnshire bagpipes
