= Ye Olde White Harte =

Listed pub in Hull, England

- The courtyard façade in 2023

General information
- Type: Public house
- Location: 25 Silver Street, Hull, England
- Coordinates: 53°44′34.6″N 0°20′00.7″W
- Completed: c. 1660; 366 years ago
- Renovated: 1881 (remodelled); Late 20th century (altered)
- Owner: Heineken UK

Design and construction
- Architect: William Catlyn
- Designations

Listed Building – Grade II*
- Official name: The Old White Hart Inn (Ye Olde White Harte)
- Designated: 13 October 1952
- Reference no.: 1197696

Renovating team
- Architects: Smith & Brodrick (1881)

Website
- yeoldewhiteharte.com

Ye Olde White Harte is a Grade II* listed public house on Silver Street in Hull, England. It was built around 1660 in the Artisan Mannerist style but did not become a pub until the 1730s. In the aftermath of the Glorious Revolution of 1688 it was the site of a successful plot to remove the Catholic governor of Hull. The pub was remodelled in 1881 in the Romantic style with extensive alteration to the interior and façade. At least two residents have suffered fatal accidents in the pub and it is reputed to be "one of Hull's most haunted".

== History ==
A house occupied the site by 1550, but the present building was constructed around 1660 in the Artisan Mannerist style, to the designs of local architect William Catlyn. A local tradition, apparently originating in the 19th century, claims that the pub was the site where Sir John Hotham planned his refusal to admit Charles I to the town, beginning the Siege of Hull, the first engagement of the war. Historians have rejected the claim because the present building post-dates those events. As a result of this tradition, one of the upper rooms became known as the "Plotting Room".

The building is also associated with events following the Glorious Revolution of 1688. A room in the house was reportedly used by the Protestant deputy governor of Hull while planning the removal of governor Marmaduke Langdale, 2nd Baron Langdale, a Catholic appointee of James II. Langdale was subsequently removed in an event known locally as Town Taking Day.

The structure became a pub in the 1730s. In April 1806, the landlord's 26-year-old daughter died after suffering burns when her clothing caught fire while she was lighting a fireplace in the main bar. The pub was remodelled in 1881 by the Hull architectural practice Smith & Brodrick. The work included alterations to the façade and the creation of Romantic-style interiors intended to evoke the appearance of a 17th-century inn. Internal timbers of the building show evidence of fire damage dating to 1883. In April 1912, the landlady died after falling down a staircase and breaking her neck.

The pub was granted statutory protection when it was designated a Grade II* listed building on 13 October 1952. An application to make internal alterations was refused in 2017 after objections by Historic England. Some of the proposed alterations, including removal of a food service counter were later made without consent. A complaint was made to Hull City Council by the Campaign for Real Ale (CAMRA) and an investigation led to the owners stating that the servery had been sent for restoration and would be reinstalled. As of January 2026, the freehold was owned by Heineken UK.

Ye Olde White Harte is regarded by CAMRA as having an interior of "outstanding national historic importance" and is rated three stars on its National Inventory of Historic Pub Interiors. Hull Live has described the White Harte as "one of Hull's most haunted pubs"; the bar also displays a skull of unknown provenance.

== Architecture ==
=== Exterior ===
The building stands on Silver Street in Old Town, but faces a courtyard between that street and Bowlalley Lane. An alleyway connects the two streets and provides access to the pub. A billiards room is built over the alleyway to the north of the courtyard. To the east and west of the courtyard are late 18th or early 19th-century brick buildings.

The earliest part of the current structure dates to around 1660 and is constructed of red brick, with its upper floors painted in a light colour. The façade, facing into the courtyard, is of six bays. The entrance is in the third bay from the left and is slightly projecting, with a lead-glazed door with an oval-shaped overlight and pediment. The windows are square-headed with a keystone detail. At the top of the ground floor is a prominent cornice detail. The first floor has 12-pane sash windows except for the bay above the entrance which has a taller single-light window. The attic floor has a single square window and the roof has pantiles.

=== Interior ===
The interior largely reflects the major refurbishment of 1881 by the Hull architects Smith & Brodrick, who remodelled the ground floor as an antiquarian interpretation of a 17th-century inn. The ground floor comprises two bars arranged on either side of a staircase, with each retaining a large brick-built fireplace introduced as part of the late Victorian scheme. Decorative stained glass also dates from this refurbishment. The dog-legged staircase is partly original, with 19th-century alterations. On the first floor are two wood-panelled rooms, now used for dining and functions, which retain some 17th-century panelling and a 17th-century panelled door. A stained-glass window on the landing depicts Sir John Hotham, the governor of Hull from 1641. The building also contains a disused built-in telephone kiosk in the former smoke room, a notable survival of its type.

== Gallery ==
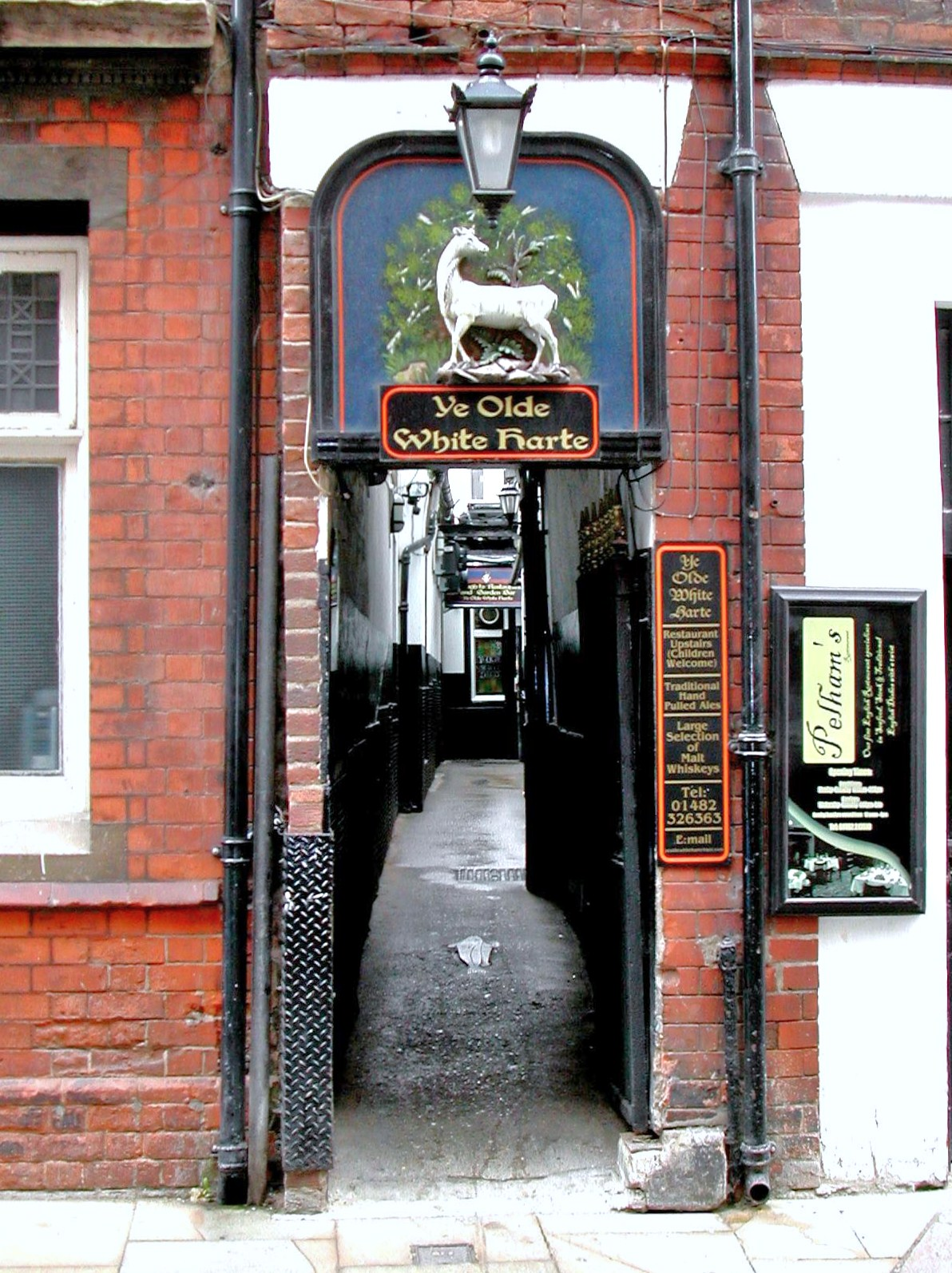
Entrance from Silver Street

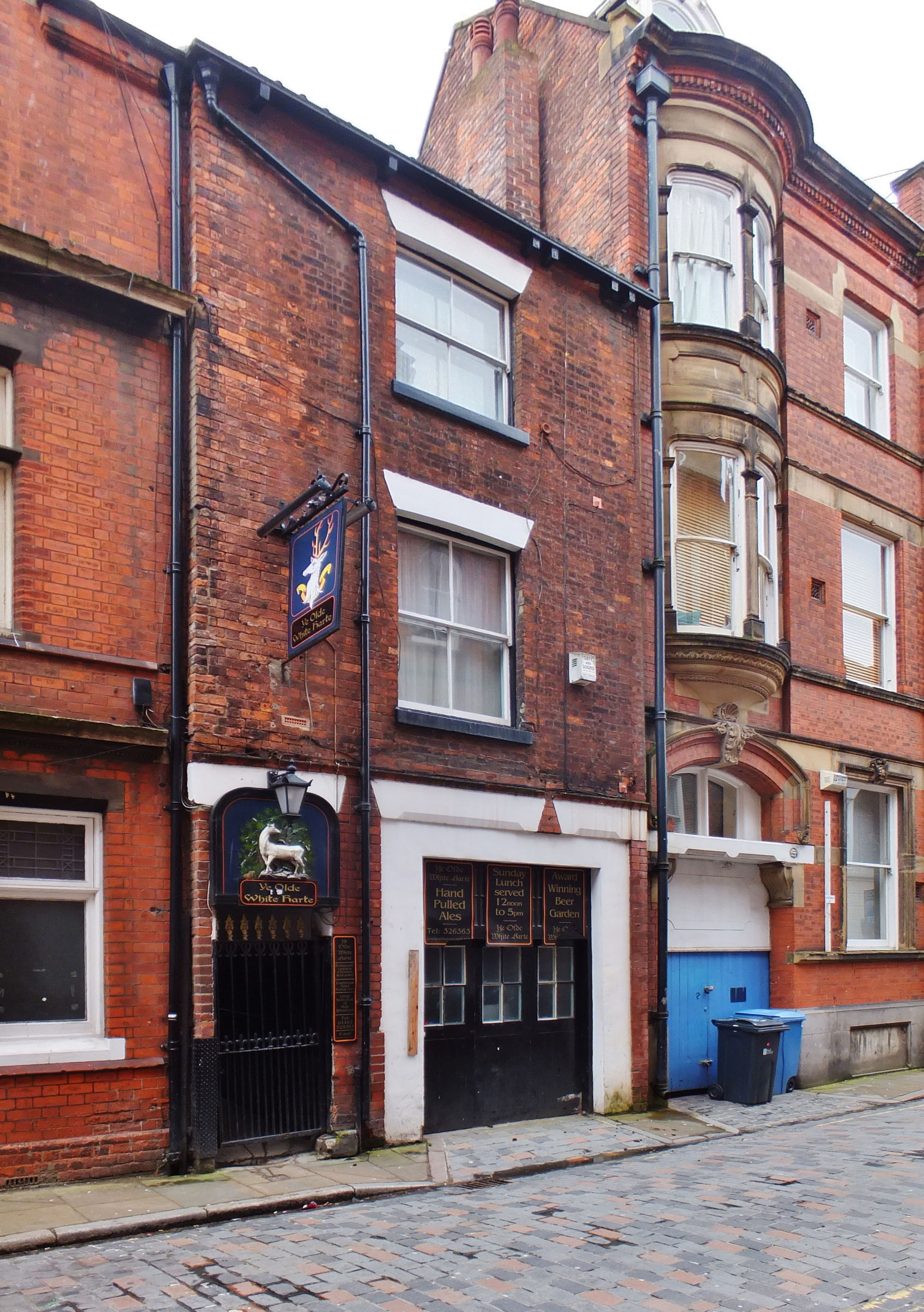
Entrance from Bowlalley Lane

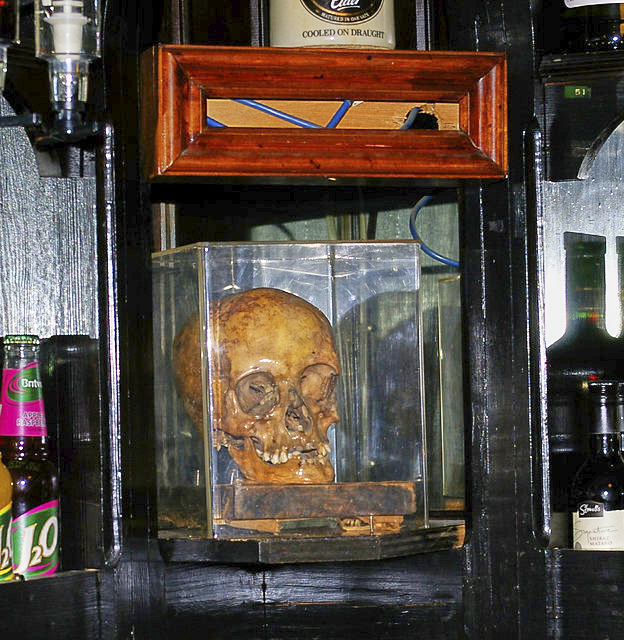
The skull

== See also ==
- Grade II* listed buildings in the East Riding of Yorkshire
