= Tupholme Abbey =

Former monastery in England

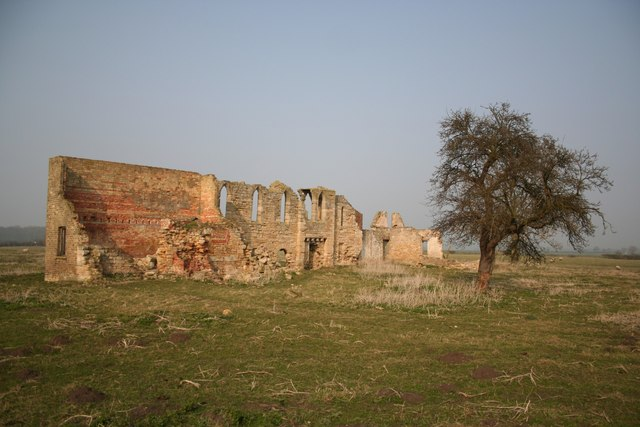
- Ruins of the Abbey
- Interactive map of Tupholme Abbey
- 53°11′56″N 0°17′17″W
- Location: Tupholme, Lincolnshire, England

History
- Founder: Gilbert and Alan de Neville
- Built: from 1155 to 1165
- Original use: Abbey

Site notes
- Architectural style: Medieval
- Governing body: Historic England
- Owner: Heritage Trust of Lincolnshire

Listed Building – Grade I
- Designated: 25 January 1927

Tupholme Abbey was a Premonstratensian abbey close to the River Witham some 10.5 miles (16.9 km) east of the city of Lincoln, England and one of nine such abbeys within the historical county. The Witham valley in Lincolnshire is notable for its high concentration of monasteries—there were six on the east bank and three on the west—all presumably drawn to the area by the usefulness of the River Witham for transport and by the wealth (in wool) that it transported. The abbey was largely destroyed by 1538, after being seized during Henry VIII's Dissolution of the Monasteries.

The abbey ruin, located off the B1190 between Bardney and Horncastle, is a Grade I listed building. It is maintained by Heritage Lincolnshire.

== The Placename ==
The name Tupholme reflects the influence of Scandinavian cultures on Lincolnshire during the Danelaw during the 9th-11th centuries and it means basically an island where rams were raised. 'Tupp' is a word for male sheep first used in the north of Britain during the Middle Ages, with origins generally given as 'unknown', though it is conceivably related to the Swedish word 'tupp' meaning a male chicken (cock). As for the 'holme' in Tupholme, it comes from an old Norse word 'holmr', meaning an island and indicating that the abbey once stood on an island in a marsh, the surrounding lands having been wet before the fens were drained for farming.

== The Premonstratensian Order ==
An order whose medieval traces are not much alluded to in modern England is the Order of Canons Regular of Prémontré, also known as the Premonstratensians, the Norbertines and formerly, in Great Britain and Ireland, as the White Canons (from the colour of their habit). This is an international religious order founded in 1120 in Prémontré near Laon, France, by Saint Norbert of Xanten, who later became Archbishop of Magdeburg. Norbert was a friend of Saint Bernard of Clairvaux, the great Cistercian abbot, and like Bernard, aimed at intensification of the Christian life. However, the Premonstratensians are not monks, but Canons Regular. Like monks, the Canons Regular live in community and celebrate together the various religious services. Unlike monks, however, the work of Canons Regular places fundamental emphasis on preaching and the exercise of pastoral ministry. There have been, and are several orders of Canons Regular, of which the Premonstratensians are one. The latter were ruled by an abbot general who, before the French Revolution, was the abbot of their French motherhouse of Prémontré, but is now resident in Rome. The larger houses of Canons Regular are sometimes ruled by an abbot and the smaller ones by a prior. All the orders of Canons Regular have as their fundamental guidelines the ancient Rule of St. Augustine, but with supplementary statutes that apply this to times and circumstances.

The Premonstratensian order received approbation by Pope Honorius II, in 1126. At that time they had, in all, nine houses, but by the mid-fourteenth century throughout western Europe there were some 1,300 monasteries for men and 400 for women. The order came to England about 1143, first founding a house in Lincoln known as Newsham (or Newhouse) Abbey. By the early sixteenth century they came to have 35 houses throughout the country, with other houses in Scotland and Ireland. All, like Tupholme Abbey, were wiped out during the Protestant Reformation.

== A House of Canons Regular ==
The abbey was founded in honour of the Annunciation between 1155 and 1165 by Gilbert and Alan de Neville by appeal to the Premonstratensians. As the founding community, an abbot and twelve canons were sent from Newsham Abbey, also in Lincolnshire.

In the Middle Ages, Lincolnshire was one of the most densely populated parts of England. Within the county there were no less than ten Premonstratensian houses. Other than Tupholme Abbey, these were: Barlings Abbey, Broadholme Priory, Cammeringham Priory, Hagnaby Abbey, Newbo Abbey, Newsham Abbey, Orford Priory, Stixwould Priory and West Ravendale Priory.

The original endowment of Tupholme Abbey embraced the demesne at Tupholme and other smaller parcels of land, along with the churches of Burreth, Middle Rasen, Market Stainton, Ranby, and Sturton. Long after the founding endowments, we know that in 1329 Henry, Earl of Lancaster (c. 1281–1345), a grandson of King Henry III (1216–1272), granted the Lincolnshire manor of Burreth, and in 1342 Ralf de Neville donated that of Ranby.

However, Tupholme was never a prosperous house— in 1347, when the abbey was heavily in debt, an enterprising abbot was accused of "forgery and counterfeiting of coin of the realm", allegedly using the proceeds to buy corn and wine, which he sold for a profit. Was this an attempt to finance the Abbey?

Records of visitations in the later years of the abbey also show some misdemeanours—in 1497 Thomas Pynderwelle was banished to Croxton Abbey in Leicestershire as he was said to have become involved with a local woman called Philippa and fathered her child. In 1482 the behaviour of the canons had evidently been unruly, as they were forbidden to leave the precincts of the abbey without permission, or to sit up drinking after Compline (the last service of the day). The penalty for such misdeeds was to be three days on a bread and water diet. Nevertheless, these negative episodes are perhaps little against a silent record of almost four hundred years of an institution dedicated in large part to prayer, pastoral ministry among the local people and care of the poor.

Tupholme was a small house and as such was suppressed in the first wave of the Dissolution of the Monasteries, in 1536. The clear revenue of the Abbey in 1534 had been £100 14s. 10d. The last abbot, John Ancaster, was given a pension of £18 and eight other canons received £1 each, which was regarded as a usual amount.

== Abbots of Tupholme ==
- Ivo, mentioned late 12th century
- Geoffrey, mentioned 1202-1230
- Thomas, mentioned1276-1289
- Ralf, elected 1293
- William, elected 1310; mentioned 1316
- Roger, mentioned c. 1348
- Simon of Lincoln, elected 1349
- John of Beseby, elected 1373
- William of Tynton, elected 1383; mentioned 1385
- John Spalding, died 1456
- John Coventry, elected 1456
- John Ancaster, mentioned 1474
- Thomas Sotby, mentioned 1488-1491
- Thomas Gryme, mentioned 1494-1509
- John Sword, mentioned 1522
- John Ancaster, last abbot, mentioned 1529.

== Seizure and Development of the Site ==
The site of the abbey, together with the church, bell tower and church yard, did not go to the poor and needy, but was granted to Sir Thomas Heneage of Hainton. The Heneages were a family already making its way. This Sir Thomas may have been the man who with his brother, Sir Robert Heneage, was a member of Henry VIII's Privy Chamber. In 1536–1546 Thomas was also Henry's Groom of the Stool, no less. His siblings included George Heneage (1484-1549), a former chaplain to Thomas Wolsey and at various times archdeacon of Oxford, archdeacon of Taunton, archdeacon of Lincoln and dean of Lincoln. Their brother was John Heneage (1484-1557), a member of Parliament, and their nephew was Sir George Heneage (c. 1520–1595), also a member of Parliament.

It seems likely that the church was demolished at an early stage of remodelling the site, churches being generally seen as a profitable source of lead and building materials. Moreover, having the church out of the way may have salved qualms of conscience about depredation of a sacred site.

Heneage built a grand house, based on the monastic buildings, for his daughter Elizabeth and her husband William Willoughby, 1st Baron Willoughby of Parham, who may have been the man of the same name who in 1536 was in service with King Henry VIII's illegitimate son, Henry Fitzroy and the nephew of the man, Gilbert Tailboys, 1st Baron Tailboys of Kyme, who in 1520 married Henry Fitzroy's mother, Elizabeth Blount.

The house Heneage built was in the fashionable Tudor style and surrounded by a large Tudor formal garden, of which traces remain on the site. This mansion passed through the Willoughby family until it was sold in 1661 by the then Lord Willoughby, onetime Governor of Barbados after whom a colony that is now part of Suriname.

Upon sale, the house and grounds became the property of the Vyner family, whose head at the time, Sir Thomas Vyner, a gold dealer and former sheriff and Lord Mayor of London was that same year created a baronet by Charles II.

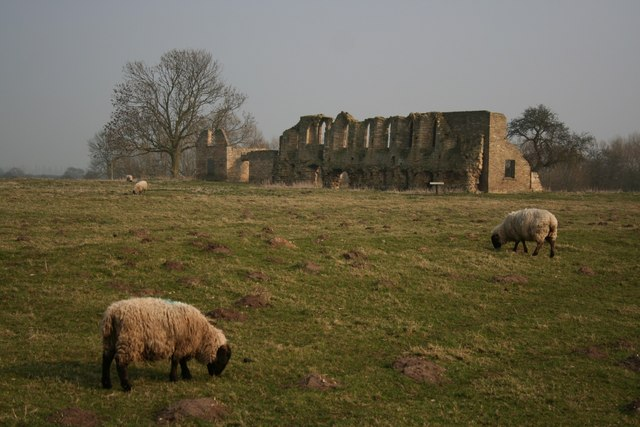
Ruins of the Abbey

By 1700 the style of the Tudor mansion was deemed unfashionable and the Vyners proceeded to demolish it, building in the classical style a new house called Tupholme Hall (demolished 1976), located some 750 metres north-east of the abbey site. They cleared away the old house, but retained the one surviving wall of the medieval abbey as an eye-catching feature, a fashionable ornament in their surrounding landscaped parkland. Despite these developments, in the 1730s the Vyners moved to yet another house in the possession of their family, Gautby Hall, and let Tupholme to tenants. In the 18th century, a farmyard developed around the site of the remaining wall. By the start of the 20th century this had become a busy farmstead, but by the middle of that century it had declined and the site was used only for labourers' housing, by the 1970s becoming empty and derelict and despite attempts to save it, was demolished in 1984.

However, Tupholme Abbey was to have one more moment of fame, for in 1972 one of the country's biggest pop festivals, starring Rod Stewart and the Beach Boys (among many others), was held there.

In 1988 the site was acquired by Heritage Lincolnshire, and the ruin was repaired and opened to the public.

The surviving monastic ruin at Tupholme now comprises a single wall, standing two storeys high, virtually to eaves height. Small square-headed windows light the lower storey, which was a vaulted undercroft. The upper floor was the abbey's refectory and has lancet windows and a reader's pulpit. The pulpit appears to have been altered, possibly as part of the Vyners' landscaping scheme; this alteration may account for its survival in a region where stone was commonly reused.

== Geography and ecology ==
There are several fruiting trees on the grounds, including apple and bullace. The many ponds in the abbey grounds are home to a great deal of wildlife including fine-leaved water dropwort and great crested newt. The nearby Southrey Wood is rich in forest wildlife. Sheep have (and for thousands of years have had) a big influence on the vegetation at Tupholme, their dung promoting the growth of stinging nettles and thistles.
