= Alan de Neville (landholder) =

12th-century English landowner

Alan de Neville, sometimes known as Alan de Neville Junior (floruit 1168), was an English landowner in Lincolnshire, England. He is often confused with another Alan de Neville who was active around the same time but who was a royal forester. It is possible that the landholder was the son of the forester, but this is not certain. The uncertainty continues as to his children, with some sources saying he had four sons while others say he had no children. It is known that Neville co-founded Tupholme Abbey in Lincolnshire.

== Life ==
Alan de Neville held lands around 1168 at Ashby, Lincolnshire, and should not be confused with another Alan de Neville who held the office of chief forester under King Henry II of England. The exact family relationships of the various Neville family members in the 12th and early 13th centuries are difficult to understand and distinguish. Historian Nicholas Vincent went so far as to describe the family's relationships as "a veritable labyrinth into which many a genealogical enquiry has vanished without trace". The landholder at Ashby is frequently known as "Alan Junior" in contemporary records to distinguish him from the forester. The landholder at Ashby was perhaps the brother of Gilbert de Neville, as Alan along with Gilbert co-founded Tupholme Abbey at Tupholme in Lincolnshire. Charles R. Young argues that the younger Alan is the son of the Chief Forester, based on the fact that in the 12th century the use of "Junior" meant that the person named that was either a son or a nephew of the person with the same name. The Complete Peerage entry for the Neville family of Essex gives the landholder at Ashby as the son of the Chief Forester also, (Note: The Complete Peerage also has the Chief Forester as the co-founder of Tupholme Abbey, however.) as do the historians H. G. Richardson and G. O. Sayles.

== Legacy ==
According to Katharine Keats-Rohan, Neville had four sons – Alan, Geoffrey, Thomas, and Ivo. Young, however, says that Neville died without direct heirs and his lands went to his brother Geoffrey de Neville and nephew Hugh de Neville. The person of the same name who was holder of the forest pleas in Lincolnshire in 1169 and 1170 may have been this Alan de Neville. (Note: The holder of the forest pleas may have also been charged with enforcing the Assize of Clarendon.) The Neville in charge of forest justice acted either alone or in concert with William Basset. (Note: Neville and Basset were responsible for the counties of Nottinghamshire, Derbyshire, Cumberland, Northumberland, Yorkshire, Lincolnshire, Leicestershire, and Warwickshire. Neville alone was responsible for Berkshire, Wiltshire, and Somerset.)

It is also likely that Neville held lands in Amesbury in Wiltshire, as a widow of an Alan de Neville was given the lands of her husband, who died before Michaelmas in 1190. This widow, Juliane de Neville, held the lands for a 100-pound fine. Young argues that the justice in charge of forest pleas in 1169 and 1170 and the man who died in 1190 were the same as the co-founder of Tupholme.
