= Trevor Burnard =

New Zealand historian of slavery (1960–2024)

Trevor Graeme Burnard (15 October 1960 – 19 July 2024) was a New Zealand historian. He was a specialist in the history of slavery in the Atlantic world.

== Early life and education ==
Burnard was born in Dunedin, New Zealand, and grew up in the suburb of Green Island, where he attended the local primary school, Green Island School. It was at this school that he first developed an interest in history. Subsequently, his family moved to Invercargill, and Burnard attended Southland Boys' High School. Burnard completed his undergraduate studies at the University of Otago, graduating in 1983 with first-class honours in history. He later explained: "My history teachers at Otago were spectacular and made me want to do what they did," citing, in particular, Michael Cullen and Dorothy Page.

Burnard completed his doctoral research at Johns Hopkins University in Baltimore, United States, under the supervision of Jack P. Greene, graduating in 1986 with an MA and in 1989 with a PhD. His thesis was on plantation owners of Maryland and was later published, in 2002, as Creole Gentlemen: The Maryland Elite, 1691–1776.

== Academic career ==
While finishing his PhD at Johns Hopkins, in 1987 Burnard was appointed as a lecturer in history at the University of the West Indies, Mona in Jamaica. He later stated that his mentor at Mona was Barry W. Higman, whom he described as "the best of a stellar generation of historians who were born in Australia in the 1940s." During his time at Mona, Burnard said he did "the archival work on early Jamaica that has sustained me for my entire career." He recalled developing "an abiding interest in Jamaican history as a result of frequent visits to the Jamaica Archives in Spanish Town, driving an ancient VW Beetle in the days before the road between Kingston and Spanish Town became clogged with traffic."

After a brief appointment as a lecturer in history in 1989 at the University of Waikato in Hamilton, New Zealand, Burnard was hired as a lecturer at the University of Canterbury in Christchurch, New Zealand in 1990. At Canterbury, Burnard taught courses on American history and developed a special subject on slavery, focused on the papers of Thomas Thistlewood. From teaching Thistlewood, he developed his second book, Mastery, Tyranny and Desire: Thomas Thistlewood and his Slaves in the Anglo-Jamaican World (2004).

Burnard was professor of history at the University of Hull, where he was the Director of the Wilberforce Institute for the Study of Slavery and Emancipation . He was formerly at the University of Warwick and the University of Melbourne. He was a member of the editorial board of the journal Slavery and Abolition. Burnard died on 19 July 2024, at the age of 63.

== Personal life ==
In December 1991, he married Deborah Morgan, a librarian. They had two children.

== Selected publications ==
=== Books ===
- Writing the History of Global Slavery (2023)
- Writing Early America: From Empire to Revolution (2023)
- Jamaica in the Age of Revolution (2020)
- With John Garrigus, The Plantation Machine: Atlantic Capitalism in French Saint-Domingue and British Jamaica (2016)
- Planters, Merchants, and Slaves: Plantation Societies in British America, 1650–1820 (2015)
- Hearing Slaves Speak (2010)
- Mastery, Tyranny, and Desire: Thomas Thistlewood and His Slaves in the Anglo-Jamaican World (2004)
- Creole Gentlemen: The Maryland Elite, 1691–1776 (2002)

=== Selected articles and book chapters ===
- "A Passion For Places: The Geographic Turn In Early American History", Commonplace, July 2008.
- "The Other British Colonies". In W. Klooster (ed.), The Enlightenment and the British Colonesi (248–68). Cambridge: Cambridge University Press, 2023.
