= Thomas Thistlewood =

English planter and serial rapist (1721–1786)

- Born: 16 March 1721; Tupholme, Lincolnshire
- Died: 30 November 1786 (aged 65); Colony of Jamaica
- Occupations: Supercargo, overseer, planter
- Known for: Writing a 37-volume diary detailing the rape and torture of his slaves

Thomas Thistlewood (16 March 1721 – 30 November 1786) was an English planter, diarist and serial rapist who spent the majority of his life in the British colony of Jamaica. Born in Tupholme, Lincolnshire, Thistlewood migrated to the western end of Jamaica where he worked as a plantation overseer before acquiring ownership of several slave plantations. During his time in Jamaica, Thistlewood kept a diary in which he chronicled his life. Eventually spanning over 14,000 pages, the diary detailed the brutal physical and sexual abuse of the slaves he held authority over, first as an overseer then as a plantation owner.

In 1751, Thistlewood started working as an overseer on a sugar plantation called "Egypt"; within days, he started to rape the enslaved women on the plantation. According to his diary, over the course of his life he committed thousands of acts of rape on 138 enslaved women. He systematically raped enslaved girls and women; those that ran away were whipped and put in chains, collars, or placed in field gangs. He sometimes raped more than one woman in a night, after which he would give them some coins "for their troubles".

Two years later in 1753, Thistlewood received a runaway slave's severed head, and he placed it on a pole on the road near his home. Thistlewood also invented a form of torture called Derby's dose, which entailed flogging a slave, rubbing lime juice, salt pickle, and bird pepper on their wounds, and having a fellow slave defecate into their mouth. In 1767, Thistlewood purchased a 170-acre (69 ha) plantation called "Breadnut Island Pen"; by 1779, he had 215 enslaved people rearing livestock and growing provisions. All of his slaves were branded with his initials on their right shoulders. At Breadnut Island Pen, Thistlewood made attempts to "match" his male and female slaves; he continued to rape the women. By 1788, Thistlewood was becoming regularly ill with syphilis and his sexual abuse declined as a result.

For most of the 1780s, Thistlewood's slaves suffered from malnutrition due to intentional mistreatment. If any enslaved person were caught eating the plantation's produce, they were brutally flogged. While his slaves complained of hunger and starvation, Thistlewood continuously entertained guests with lavish meals. He never married but had a long-term concubine, an enslaved woman called Phibbah, with whom he had a son. In his will he left £3,000 (equivalent to £266,641 in 2025) and 218 slaves. Thistlewood's treatment of his enslaved workers did not attract criticism from Jamaica's slavocracy, as this was typical of the conditions faced by Jamaican slaves. His diary remains an important historical document chronicling the history of Jamaica during the 18th century.

== Early life ==
Thomas Thistlewood was born in Tupholme, Lincolnshire on 16 March 1721. The second son of a farmer, he was educated in Ackworth, West Yorkshire, where he received training in mathematics and "practical science." At age six, he inherited 200 pounds sterling from his father, but most of the estate was given to his brother, thereby giving him the opportunity to leave England. He began training as a surveyor, but after a friend and fellow surveyor reportedly went mad and threw himself into the sea, Thistlewood reflected that "now my hopes are dead". Trevor Burnard concludes that the friend in question was William Wallace, though it is also possible the man in question was James Crawford. After a two-year voyage on one of the East India Company's ships as a supercargo, Thistlewood returned to England briefly at 29 and decided to seek employment in Jamaica. On 1 February 1750, he boarded the Flamborough to Savanna la Mar, Jamaica. He had letters of recommendation but no arranged employment. He arrived on 4 May.

== Migration to Jamaica ==
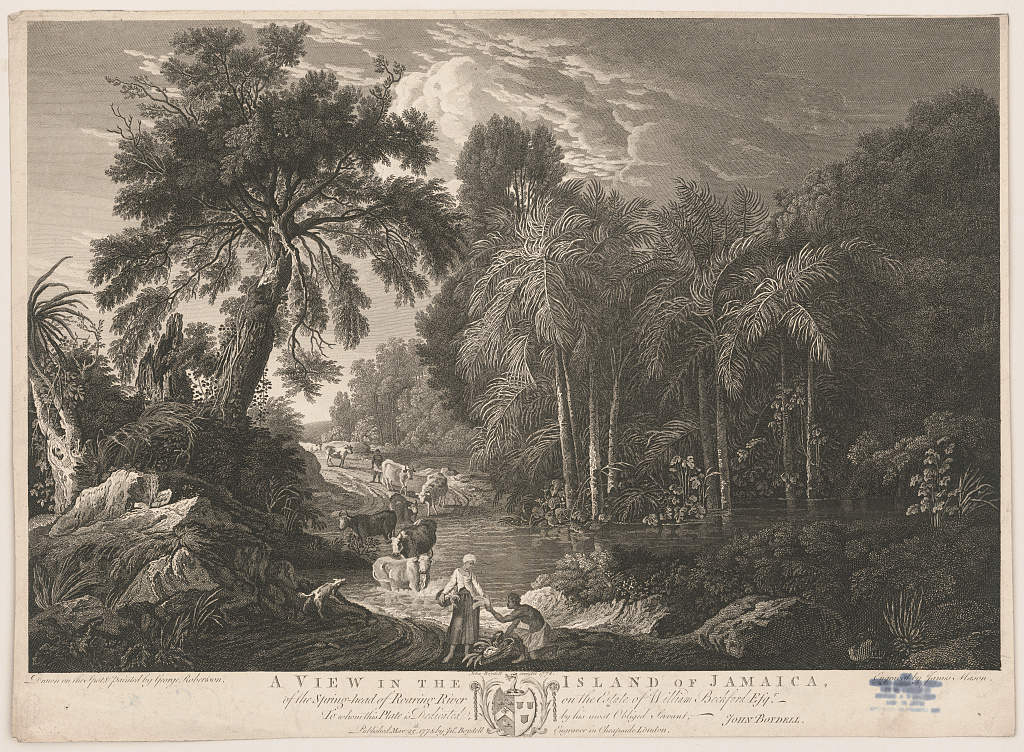
A 1778 illustration of the Jamaican countryside

Thistlewood began his Caribbean life as an overseer, first at Vineyard Pen, a cattle pen that provided meat and vegetable provisions to sugar plantations. He then worked primarily at Egypt, a sugar plantation owned by John Cope and William Dorrill, where he was an overseer from 1751 to 1767. The plantation was in Westmoreland Parish, where he supervised numerous slaves in sugar production. Egypt comprised 1,500 acres of land, of which 1,200 consisted of water and morass and were thus unsuitable for sugar production. Only 150 acres were in cane, and Thistlewood's first crop was so poor that Dorrill considered switching Egypt from sugar to a cattle pen.

During these years, Thistlewood gradually acquired slaves of his own, whom he rented out to other planters. This is also when he met Phibbah, one of many slaves with whom he was "involved" sexually, but one with whom he formed a long-lasting relationship. The "relationship" was tempestuous, and they often quarrelled.

== Thistlewood and the Maroons ==
Many enslaved people fled Egypt, but like other plantation owners and overseers, Thistlewood often hired Jamaican Maroons to hunt runaway slaves. He writes about several meetings with Leeward Maroon leaders Cudjoe and Accompong in the 1750s and 1760s. There are some strands of Maroon oral history which claim that Accompong actually died two years and Cudjoe five years after the treaty. However, primary documents by planter/historian Edward Long confirm Thistlewood's narrative that Cudjoe was alive in 1764. In addition, this narrative is further contradicted by documents from governor Roger Hope Elletson, which describe correspondence with Accompong after Cudjoe's death. Some aspects of Maroon oral history say that Cudjoe was also born in 1659, meaning he would be 100 years old at the time of meeting him. However, other versions of Maroon oral history state he was the son of Naquan, and therefore a younger man.

In late 1752, when out for a stroll, Thistlewood came across Congo Sam, a slave of his who had run away a month before, and tried to recapture him. Sam attacked Thistlewood with a dull machete, and inflicted some minor injuries on him, before another slave, London, came to Thistlewood's assistance, and they captured Sam. Two other slaves, Abigail and Bella, refused to help, and supported Sam's attempt to gain freedom. In the trial that followed, Abigail and Bella were given 100 lashes each, but because London refused to testify against Sam, he was acquitted. Slaves on many Jamaican plantations were not properly fed, and often resorted to stealing cane. In 1755–56, a slave named Scotland was caught stealing corn and plantains at Egypt. The watchman shot him and chopped him to death.

== Tacky's War ==
During Tacky's War in 1760, and subsequent slave revolts that decade, Thistlewood wrote about the fear planters felt about the uprising's possible success. He commended the Jamaican Maroons of Cudjoe's Town (Trelawny Town) for their bravery in fighting the rebels. Thistlewood wrote about rebel slaves killing white men, such as a Mr. Smith and a Captain Hoar. He was extremely anxious about the rebellion's progress and expressed disappointment with Royal Navy sailors who got drunk instead of fighting the rebels. Thistlewood noted that several of his own slaves were becoming disrespectful to him, and put it down to inspiration they were receiving from news of Tacky's revolt. In the years that followed, Thistlewood wrote about attempts to put down smaller, spin-off rebellions, especially the ones in western Jamaica, led by Apongo, a slave belonging to Cope. According to Thistlewood, Apongo was a "prince in Guinea", who paid homage to the King of Dahomey. Thistlewood claimed that Apongo was "surprised and took prisoner when hunting, and sold for a slave."

Thistlewood wrote about John Jones's house being burnt by rebel slaves, who initially defeated a contingent of white militias, killing a number of soldiers. Despite his anxiety, Thistlewood still found time to rape several of his slaves. Eventually, the revolt was suppressed on both the eastern and western ends of the island. A number of slaves in western Jamaica, including some who belonged to Cope, such as Apongo, were executed in the aftermath. For their part in the rebellion, two of Thistlewood's Egypt slaves, Quacoo and Abraham, were sentenced to be resold in the Spanish Caribbean colonies. In 1766, Thistlewood was a part of the militia that put down another slave revolt, inspired by Tacky, this time in western Jamaica. In 1776, he was again armed, as white Jamaicans heard rumours of another rebellion, which did not materialise.

== Owner of Breadnut ==
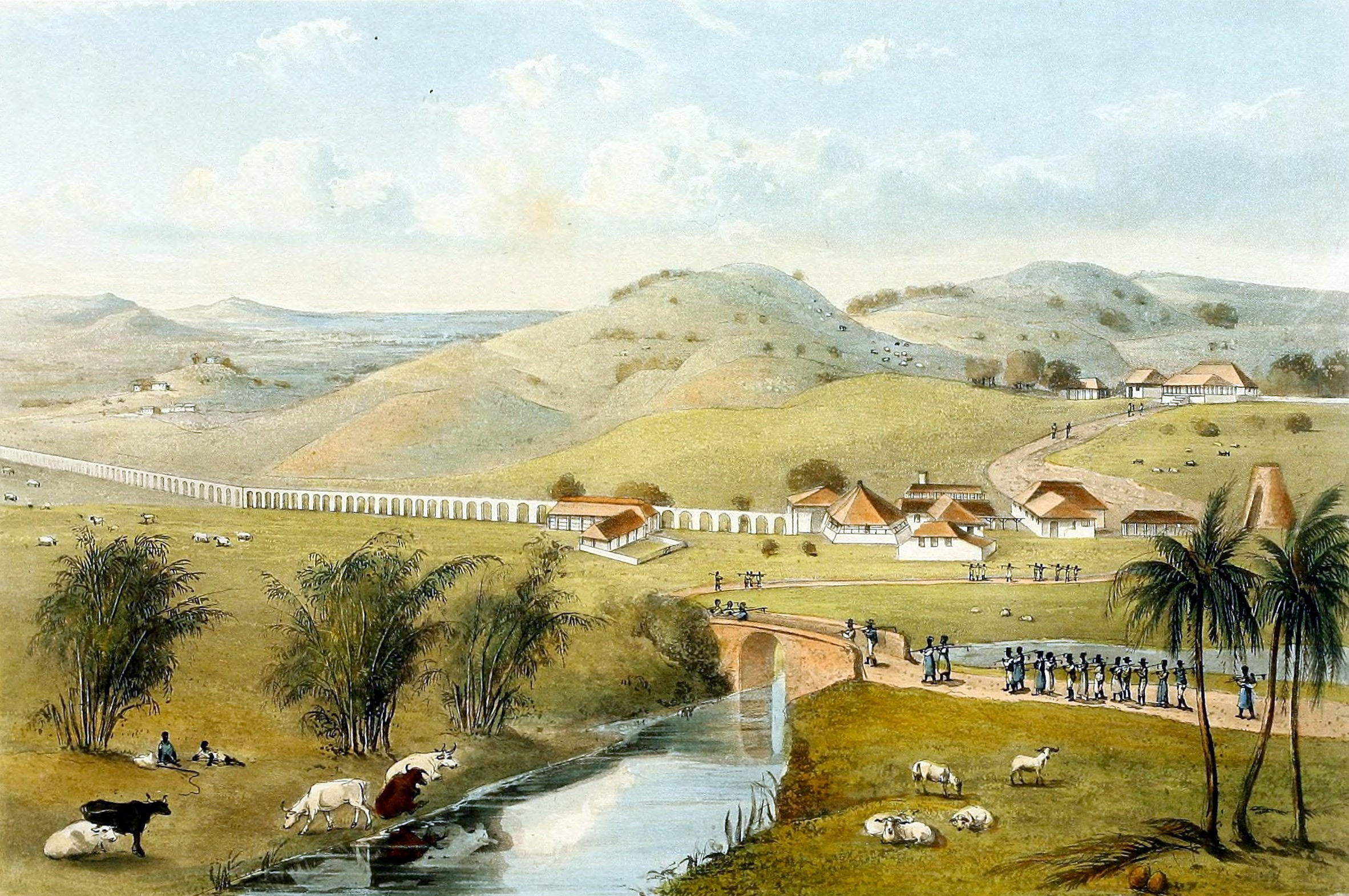
An illustration of Trinity plantation by James Hakewill, a typical Jamaican sugar plantation

While overseer of Egypt, Thistlewood began to acquire slaves, whom he then rented them out to earn an additional income. All of the enslaved people were branded with "TT" on their right shoulders. When Bess's son Bristol was seven, Thistlewood had him branded. When Mary was recaptured after running away, Thistlewood had her flogged, branded on her left cheek, and "put her on a steel collar with a few links of chain to it". By 1762, he owned 12 slaves. By 1767, he owned 28.

In 1767, Thistlewood purchased a 160-acre plantation, Breadnut Island Pen, where about 30 slaves raised provisions and livestock. That tally declined to 26 three years later, but by 1779, he increased his slave population to 32. By 1782, Thistlewood had 34 slaves, of whom nine were men, 12 women, and 13 underage. Thistlewood lacked the capital to purchase a sugar plantation, 18th-century Jamaica's most lucrative crop. Instead, he settled for a venture that was less prestigious but had the potential to be almost as profitable. Thistlewood hired out slaves during the crop season to larger sugar plantations, while on his land he planted a number of provisions, such as turnips, cabbages, parsley, nutmeg, coconuts, and coffee, which he then sold to the owners of sugar estates. Thistlewood also pursued a variety of scientific and intellectual interests. He acquired several hundred books, often on scientific and technical subjects; collected and described medicinal plants and other botanical specimens; and kept a detailed weather record for 34 years. He sent a detailed package containing these observations to the wealthy colonial writer Edward Long, but Long never acknowledged receipt in his writings, though they can be found among Long's unpublished manuscripts in the British Museum.

Breadnut Island's gardens were considered among the finest in western Jamaica before they were ruined in an October 1780 hurricane. Many of Thistlewood's sheep were killed by the hurricane, so he allowed his slaves to eat them. A year later, the enslaved were still asking him for clothes to replace those lost in the hurricane. In 1781, another hurricane so damaged Thistlewood's own dwelling that he could no longer live there. His slaves' houses were also damaged, corn and plantains lost, and the gardens again destroyed. The enslaved suffered from a shortage of food for most of that decade. Thistlewood grew crops for sale and flogged any slave who stole them. While the enslaved complained of hunger and starvation, Thistlewood entertained guests such as William Beckford, dining out on lavish meals, including crabs, mudfish, shrimps, mutton, turnips, broccoli, duck, watermelons, and a variety of alcohol. In 1781, because of illness, Thistlewood tried to sell Breadnut Pen. He failed to find a buyer and kept the property until he died.

== Life in Jamaica ==
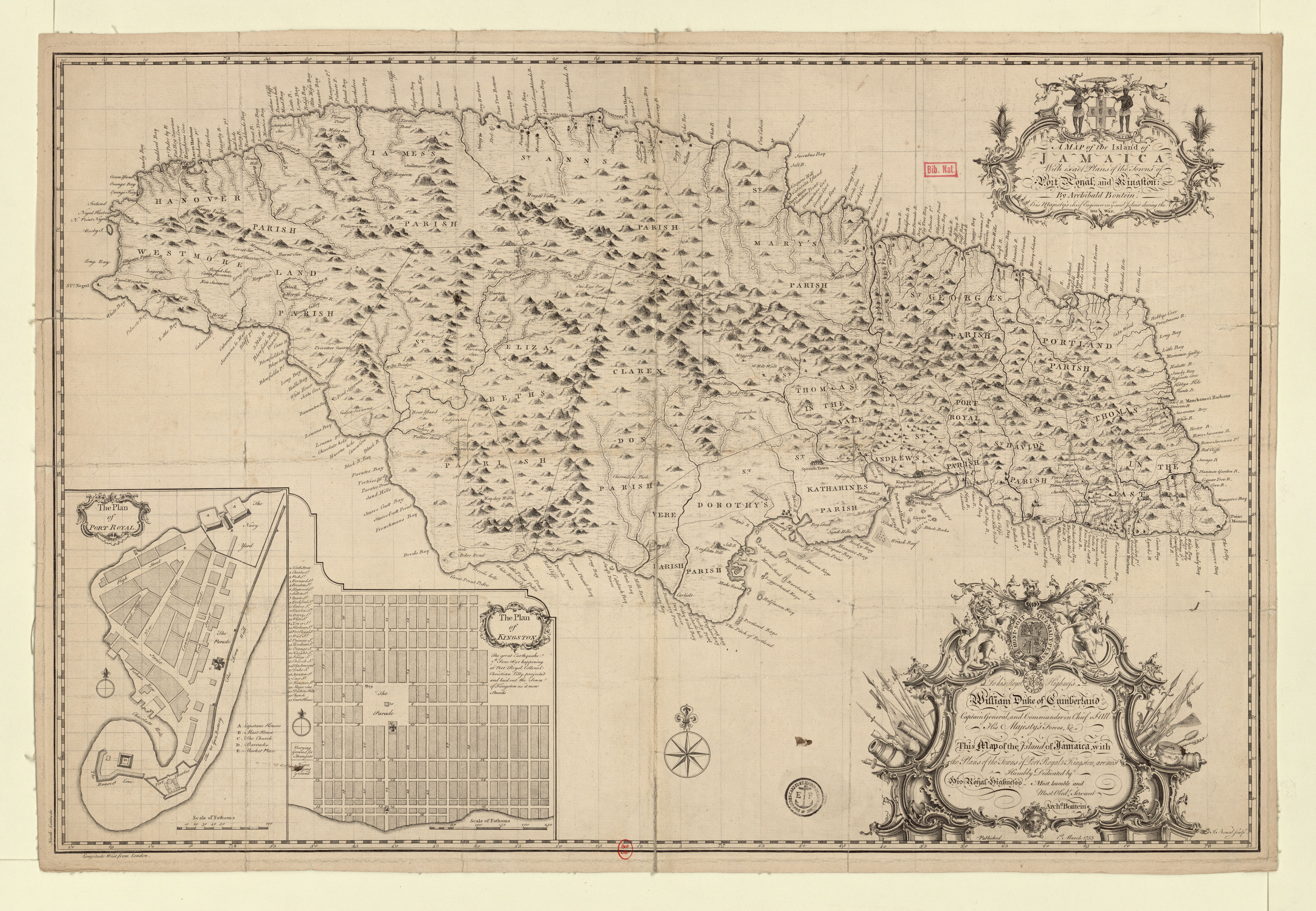
A 1753 map of Jamaica

Jamaica was by far the richest colony in the British Empire. Thistlewood was only of average wealth in white Jamaican society, especially in comparison to wealthy planters such as Simon Taylor, but at the time of his death he was still far wealthier than most British men in other parts of the Empire. He acquired more wealth in Jamaica than he could have done if he had chosen to remain in Lincolnshire. White Jamaicans who survived tropical diseases were on average 50 times wealthier than residents of the British Isles, and certainly wealthier than their counterparts in North America.

In 1750, a 29-year-old Thistlewood arrived in Jamaica with very few possessions but was immediately sought after as a plantation overseer, and by 1757 his wages had risen to £100 a year. A year later, that was increased to £120 a year. This was an enormous sum compared to the average wages of white Europeans living in the Americas. Such wages allowed him to purchase slaves and hire them out. He could have continued to make more money working for others, but in the mid-1760s he decided to become an independent landowner, not as a rich sugar producer but as a modestly well-to-do market gardener and horticultural expert for Jamaica's western end. He acquired local respectability, often dining with his parish's wealthiest planters, and served in several local offices, including justice of the peace. After one lavish meal in 1778, Thistlewood and his fellow planters played cricket.

Whites were outnumbered nine to one in Jamaica, and the imbalance affected everything on the island. During Thistlewood's first year in Jamaica, he lived in an almost exclusively black world, having no contact with other whites for weeks on end. Such disparity was even greater in rural western Jamaica, where Thistlewood eventually settled, with the proportion of slaves to whites being as high as 15 to one. Planters such as Thistlewood thus lived in a superficially black society maintained by white control using fear, inequality, and brutality. With almost no societal restraints, slave owners ruled their slaves with a degree of violence that left outside observers aghast. Historian Trevor Burnard calls Thistlewood "a brutal sociopath", but suggests that Thistlewood's treatment of his slaves was not unusual. Unlike other colonies where slavery was widespread such as the Virginia Colony, where slave owners often developed a paternalistic yet still cruel attitude toward their slaves, most Jamaican slave owners were convinced that only the severe application of brute force could keep the more numerous African slaves under control.

In 1753, Thistlewood wrote about the trial of several slaves for the theft of goods from the Salt River estate, who belonged to his employer, Dorrill. "Oliver's Quaw hanged; Fortune's Quaw both ears cropped, both nostrils slit, and marked on both cheeks, Cheddar's right ear cropped, right nostril slit, & marked on the left cheek." When a Salt River slave named Robin ran away with two boys from Egypt, Dorrill had Robin tried and executed, after which Thistlewood received Robin's head and "put it upon a pole and stuck it up just at the angle of the road in the home pasture." In 1771, another slave, Frazier's Beck, was tried for hosting a large number of slaves at a "supper", and punished by having "her ear slit, 39 lashes under the gallows, and 39 again against the Long Stores." Several other slaves received similar punishments as a result of the trial.

=== Treatment of slaves ===
Thistlewood routinely punished his slaves with fierce floggings and other cruel and gruesome punishments. In 1756, Hazat was recaptured after running away, and Thistlewood "put him in the bilboes both feet; gagged him; locked his hands together; rubbed him with molasses & exposed him naked to the flies all day, and to the mosquitoes all night, without fire." Thistlewood often had a slave beaten, after which salt pickle, lime juice, and bird pepper were rubbed onto the open wounds. He wrote that when two slaves named Punch and Quacoo were caught for running away, they were well flogged, "and then washed and rubbed in salt pickle, lime juice & bird pepper."

In 1756, Thistlewood added a gruesome element to this punishment on several occasions. On 28 January, he wrote: "Had Derby well whipped, and made Egypt shit in his mouth." Derby had been stealing and eating sugar cane. Thistlewood called this favoured form of punishment "Derby's dose". On 26 May, Derby was caught eating canes by Port Royal, another slave. Thistlewood records: "Had him well flogged and pickled, then made Hector shit in his mouth." On 24 July, Port Royal tried to run away, but was recaptured. Thistlewood wrote, "Gave him a moderate whipping, pickled him well, made Hector shit in his mouth, immediately put a gag whilst his mouth was full & made him wear it 4 or 5 hours." The following day, a female slave named Phillis was punished the same way, although apparently spared the gag, and received the punishment again on the 31st. On 30 July, a slave named Hector was whipped for losing his hoe, and Thistlewood "made New Negro Joe piss in his eyes & mouth." On 27 September, Egypt was whipped and given "Derby's dose" for eating cane. In October of that year, three more slaves, Hector, Joe and Mr. Watt's Pomona, were punished in the same way after being caught eating sugar cane.

Whilst there are no recordings of "Derby's dose" after 1756, Thistlewood's other cruel and vicious punishments continued. In 1770, Coobah exacted some revenge for punishments received for attempting to run away by excreting in a "punch strainer" in the cookroom. Thistlewood had the last word by having the offended items "rubbed all over face and mouth". His systematic rape of enslaved girls and women was another aspect of his brutality. Enslaved women who ran away were whipped and put in collars, yokes or placed in field gangs, and raped by Thistlewood, who documented his activities in his journal. Some of the whippings were extremely severe, and for the most minor of infractions. Thistlewood had Dick flogged for planting potato slips at the wrong end of the ground.

Coobah ran away 14 times between 1770 and 1774, but was recaptured each time. In 1771, when she was recaptured after running away, Thistlewood had her flogged and "put a chain about her neck". On another occasion, he "flogged her well & brand marked her in the forehead". In 1774, Thistlewood sold her to a ship bound for Georgia after another runaway attempt. In 1772, he had three slaves whipped for damage caused by walking through his corn piece. In 1774, he ordered the flogging of a party of slaves for not working hard enough. Between 1774 and 1775, Solon failed to catch enough fish on several occasions, and Thistlewood had him flogged for his failures. After one beating, Solon ran away, but eventually returned, whereupon Thistlewood had him flogged and "a collar and chain put about his neck", after which he was immediately sent out to fish again. This was a punishment meted out to Solon on several occasions, often after he was recaptured following an attempt to run away. In 1776, when Lincoln failed to catch enough fish, Thistlewood ordered the unfortunate slave-fisherman to be flogged and "put him in the bilboes". In 1778, when the slave driver, Dick, failed in his duty to force the slaves to work hard enough, Thistlewood ordered another slave, Jimmy, to have Dick flogged. But Thistlewood expressed dissatisfaction with Jimmy's efforts in flogging Dick and ordered that Jimmy be flogged. Thistlewood demoted Dick to the field, and made Strap the new slave driver. But Strap was overfond of the whip, and flogged Peggy so hard that she nearly lost the use of her right eye. Thistlewood had Strap flogged for his carelessness, and reinstated Dick as slave driver.

=== Mortality rates ===
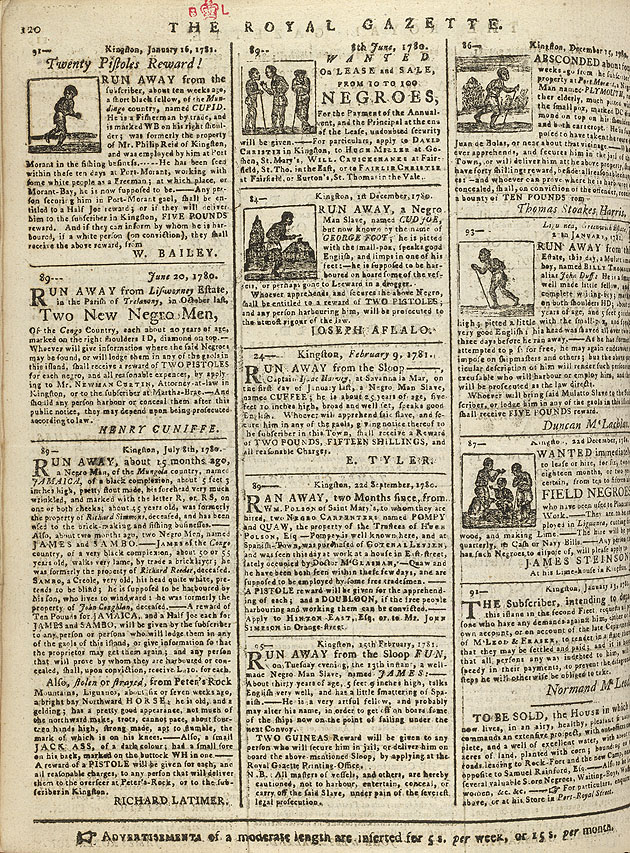
A 1781 edition of the Royal Gazette, featuring several advertisements for runaway slaves

With mortality rates high and birth rates low among Jamaican slaves, white plantations depended on the continued importation of slaves from Africa; one-third of all slaves brought to the New World on British ships went to Jamaica. The death rate was so high that 500,000 slaves had to be imported to increase the island's slave population by just 250,000. The mortality rate for white Jamaicans was nearly as great, and more than a third died from tropical diseases within three years of their arrival. While the black slaves and white planters died in large numbers from diseases and illnesses, the free towns of the Jamaican Maroons experienced large increases in population.

There was a high mortality rate among children. Coobah's child Silvia died in 1768 at the age of one. In 1770, Maria gave birth to a baby, who died a week later. In 1775, another of Maria's daughters, Rachel, died aged four. In 1771, Abba's son Johnie died at the age of six from lockjaw, and later that same year she lost another child at the age of one week. Two years later, her remaining son, Neptune, took ill and died after "a most violent cold". In 1775, Abba gave birth to a boy, who died a week later. In 1771, Nanny lost her six-year-old daughter, little Phibba from yaws, after Dr Panton prescribed mercury pills. In 1773, another daughter of Nanny died in a matter of weeks after being born. Between 1772-3, two children of Phoebe died within a week of being born. Fanny's daughter Patty died six months after being born. In 1777, Sally gave birth to a daughter who died the next day, and a similar bereavement happened to Abba three years later. In 1782, Damsel's baby died four days after birth, and a year later, Bess's mulatto child for Thistlewood's carpenter died after a week.

In 1767, Thistlewood summoned John Hartnole to administer to his ill slave, Sukey, and he responded by bleeding her and rubbing her with water. In 1769, Phibba took ill, and Thistlewood resorted to a number of remedies, including a dose of salts, purging powders, and mercury pills. Hartnole also ordered that another sickly slave be "rubbed with spirits of turpentine", and be forced to consume "a drink of sea punch". Both slaves were given "hartshorn drops in water" to swallow. Hartnole, who then became overseer of Breadnut Pen, took Phibbah's daughter, Coobah, to sleep with, as his reward. When Thistlewood's slave developed a sore in her nose, Dr James Wedderburn recommended at least two "purges". Peggy feared she was going to die when forced to consume an unnamed liquid that another European medic, Dr Pugh, forced upon her. When Cudjoe became "lame of his hip", the doctor tried to cure his ailment by bleeding him. When Bess's young son Bristol took ill, the doctor bled him and gave him a mercury pill, but he survived the treatment. In 1775, both Phibba and her son, Mulatto John, took ill, and the European doctor bled them.

When two of his slaves were affected by yaws, Thistlewood gave them mercury pills on his doctor's advice. When Abba suffered from boils, Thistlewood followed the doctor's advice, and plied her with mercury pills. When Coobah suffered from venereal disease, she was given mercury pills. She took them "till her mouth begun to be sore". Not satisfied with the European doctors, Coobah resorted to myal prescriptions, for which Thistlewood reprimanded her. Franke was also given mercury pills as a cure for the "clap". In 1770, when Jimmy developed a "violent itching", the doctor prescribed brimstone, grease, salts, and mercury pills. In 1771, Phoebe's leg broke out into sores, after which the doctor gave her mercury pills. That experience must have been unpleasant, because when her leg broke out into sores the following year, she hid it from Thistlewood, instead opting for obeah remedies. When Thistlewood found out, he had her flogged and "put in the bilboes". Similarly, that same year, Damsel was bitten by a dog, but dreaded the European medical practices, and tried to hide the injury from Thistlewood, who, when he discovered it, "flogged her well & put her in the bilboes". Damsel instead put her trust in a slave named Will, who was owned by a Mr Wilson, and happened to be an obeah man. Many slaves had more confidence in creole "doctresses" than in European medicine. In 1772, when Pompey had a fever, the doctor first bled him, then "dosed" him with a mercury pill. In 1779, when Sukey had a fit, she was given burnt wine and a mercury pill. These treatments did little to arrest the death rates among the enslavers or the enslaved.

=== Sexual violence ===
Though Thistlewood never married, his sexual activity was prolific, with his diary chronicling 3,852 acts of "consensual" and nonconsensual sexual intercourse with 138 women, nearly all of them enslaved Black women. Thistlewood's sexual habits were formed in England, where, he wrote, he had sex with prostitutes at places such as Drury Lane and Fleet Market. He also had a sexual relationship with Bett Mitchell, whose parents rejected his proposal of marriage, and an affair with a married woman, Elizabeth Toyne. His lack of steady employment meant that he could not form a lasting relationship, and contributed to his decision to migrate to Jamaica.

Thistlewood had a lifelong sexual relationship with his slave Phibbah, a Coromantee who essentially became his "wife" (as she was called in the will) and had his only son, Mulatto John. Over their 33-year relationship, Phibbah and Thistlewood developed what Burnard calls "a warm and loving relationship, if such a thing was possible between a slave and her master." In 1768, Thistlewood hired Phibbah from Cope for £18 a year (equivalent to £2,627 in 2025) and brought her to Breadnut Pen. Phibbah eventually acquired property including land, livestock, and slaves. Even when she was a slave, she acquired property, such as a filly she sold for £4.10 shillings, and a mare she sold for nearly £6, both in 1760. But Phibbah was not Thistlewood's only "wife". At Vineyard Pen, shortly after he arrived in Jamaica, he took one female slave named Marina to be his concubine, occasionally having to escape her complaints about his sexual abuse of other slaves he supervised. Thistlewood sometimes raped more than one slave in a night, after which he would sometimes give them some coins "for their troubles".

Within days of becoming overseer of Egypt, Thistlewood began raping the enslaved women, starting with a possibly underage girl, Ellin. After Ellin, Thistlewood moved on to Dido, but shortly afterwards he began to notice the appearance of red spots that indicated the appearance of "the clap". Joseph Horlock used the traditional European cures of the 18th century, by having Thistlewood "blooded" and giving him 24 mercury pills and a bottle of balsam drops. Horlock also required Thistlewood to bathe his infected organ "a long time in new milk night and morning". His venereal disease did not deter him, and he raped another slave, Jenny, before returning to the infected Dido several times. He had a tempestuous "relationship" with Jenny until late 1753, during which he bought her several gifts, but that did not stop him from raping Susannah, Big Mimber, Belinda, and Dido in places like the morass, on the plantain walk, and in the curing-house and boiling-house. When he finally dropped Jenny, Thistlewood was "in sad pain with the buboes".

By the time Thistlewood began his relationship with Phibbah, his venereal infection had abated somewhat. While involved with her, he still raped enslaved women such as Phoebe, Egypt Susannah, Mountain Susannah, Ellen, Violet, Mazarine, Warsoe, Little Mimber, Abba, Mirtilla, Frankie and Sabina. Phibbah argued with Thistlewood over his frequent rape of another slave, Aurelia. After raping a slave named Fanny, Thistlewood suffered another venereal infection. He also raped slaves owned by other people. But Thistlewood also suspected Phibbah of having sexual relations with another slave, Egypt Lewie. At Breadnut Pen, Thistlewood made attempts to "match" his male slaves with female partners, with varying degrees of success. He still raped female slaves he had paired off. Although Thistlewood approved Abba's pairing with Cudjoe, Thistlewood raped her 39 times in 1771 alone, and 155 times over a seven-year period. He did not approve of Abba changing partners from Cudjoe to Jimmy. When he caught them having sex, Thistlewood "put both of them in the [iron restraints around their ankles], and when light flogged them". Despite being paired with Lincoln, Sukey was raped by Thistlewood 39 times.

Thistlewood raped Sally several times, and she ran away after one such experience. Thistlewood had her captured and brought back to Breadnut Pen, put her in the stocks, and raped her again. Sally ran away several times, after which she was often recaptured and flogged. In 1775, despite being heavily pregnant, Franke was raped by Thistlewood. She miscarried a week later. While Thistlewood and other overseers and white employees chose their sexual victims from slave women, many white enslavers in Jamaica kept mulatto "free coloured" women as mistresses, such as Dorrill and his mistress Elizabeth Anderson. But even white enslavers with a white wife and a mulatto mistress often raped their slaves. Cope and Thistlewood even raped slave women who had regular male slave partners. In 1754, Dorrill hired William Crookshanks to assist Thistlewood, and he immediately raped a slave named Bess. Within three months he was complaining of having contracted "the clap". In 1757, another white employee, Thomas Fewkes, caught the same disease from a slave named Little Lydde, who was raped by Thistlewood.

Unsurprisingly, Phibbah developed a venereal disease in 1761, and on the advice of his European doctor, Thistlewood gave her mercury pills. Thistlewood himself took laudanum on doctor's orders. He and Phibbah continued to suffer from venereal diseases throughout the 1760s and 1770s, and both took mercury pills. Thistlewood apparently passed on his venereal disease to an underage slave, Mulatto Bessie, whom he had raped 11 times. He gave her mercury pills to combat her illness. In 1768, even though Coobah's daughter had recently died, Thistlewood raped Coobah. Rape was common in Jamaica under slavery. In 1756, Thistlewood wrote that when female slaves Egypt, Susannah and Mazerine refused Cope's advances, Cope had them whipped and raped two other slaves, Eve and Beck, instead. Unsurprisingly, Cope also had venereal disease. From 1781, Thistlewood complained of regular illnesses, and his sexual activity and sexual abuse declined as a result. Consequently, he observed that Phibbah was looking elsewhere for sexual gratification.

== Family and death ==
Thistlewood was the uncle of Arthur Thistlewood, a British radical activist and conspirator in the Cato Street Conspiracy. Thistlewood never married, but had a son, Mulatto John, by his slave Phibbah, who was originally a slave of Cope's. John was born on 29 April 1760, and Cope manumitted him on 3 May 1762. An elder son, Thomas, born to Jenny, died in childhood. Thistlewood eventually purchased Phibbah from Cope and lived with her at Breadnut Island. He bought a number of books for Mulatto John to read, but John showed little interest in reading, a disappointment to his father, who later accused John of stealing money from him. In 1775, Thistlewood apprenticed Mulatto John to William Hornby as a carpenter. John was unhappy with his apprenticeship, and looked forward to the time when he could serve in the militia and get away from Hornby. One day in 1779, when John refused to go to work, Thomas had him flogged "pretty well" to persuade him to change his mind. When the American Revolutionary War broke out, John joined the "Brown Infantry", a British colonial regiment consisting of multiracial Jamaicans, to prepare for a French invasion that never came.

In 1780, John took ill and had to be brought home by his mother. Thistlewood wrote that John "is very weak indeed & not in his right senses." Doctors of European origin were called and prescribed doses of bark and rhubarb, and, according to Thistlewood, "also laid blisters inside each thigh...They gave him a blister which brought away a great quantity of putrid blood." But despite, or because of, the doctors' attention, John died of a fever on 7 September 1780, though Thistlewood and Phibbah believed that John had been poisoned by a jealous slave. Thistlewood seems to have enjoyed his powerful position over black female slaves, and showed very little interest in Mary Holmes when he finally met another woman who came from Lincolnshire. When slaves paired up, Thistlewood often disregarded such unions and raped the female slave. When Little Mimber and a slave driver named Johnnie became a "couple", Thistlewood raped Little Mimber to "celebrate" the union. In 1764, Thistlewood's nephew John Thistlewood joined his uncle in Jamaica, but when John sexually abused Little Mimber on a regular basis, Johnnie became angry, and in an attempt to maintain order, Thomas warned his nephew off, and delivered a harsh physical punishment to the hapless Mimber. Later that year, John Thistlewood was found drowned, possibly as a result of revenge by Johnnie. A year later, Thistlewood's slaves blew shell horns and fired guns to celebrate John Thistlewood's death.

Burnard also suggests that Jamaica was very different from the colony of Virginia where the political offices such as vestrymen and justices of the peace tended to be dominated by wealthier planters. Jamaica did not have as many wealthy whites to fill such offices and thus had to draw on the services of white men with average wealth like Thistlewood. Because of the relative scarcity of whites, says Burnard, Jamaica experienced a greater spirit of white independence, pride and egalitarianism in comparison to other European colonies in the Americas. Working-class white men behaved as if they were the equal of the wealthiest white planters, in stark contrast with the class system entrenched in Britain.

In 1784, Thistlewood became so ill that he had difficulty writing in his diary. He never returned to England, dying at Breadnut Island in November 1786. Thistlewood called Phibbah his "wife" in the will that freed her. William Tomlinson, acting on behalf of Thistlewood's estate, paid Cope £80 to free her on 26 November 1792. When Thistlewood died at the age of 65, his estate of £3,000 (equivalent to £407,368 in 2025) and 34 slaves was rather modest by Jamaican standards, but quite substantial compared to those in other British colonies.

== Legacy ==
In the late 1970s, the Jamaican historian Douglas G. Hall learned that a 37-volume diary by a slave owner from his home parish of Westmoreland Parish was being kept at the Lincolnshire Archives in England, and traveled there to read them. This turned out to be the highly revealing diary of Thistlewood. Hall published In Miserable Slavery: Thomas Thistlewood in Jamaica, 1750-86 in 1989, which provided a wealth of detail on the historical events that Thistlewood experienced and his own practices as an enslaver. Trevor Burnard supplied additional context with Mastery, Tyranny, and Desire: Thomas Thistlewood and His Slaves in the Anglo-Jamaican World in 2008. In 2011, Thistlewood's diaries were purchased by the Beinecke Rare Book & Manuscript Library, Yale University. They are now available online.

== See also ==
- Tacky's War
- List of plantations in Jamaica
