= Tupholme =

Village in the East Lindsey district of Lincolnshire, England

Coordinates: 53.200840°N 0.288418°W

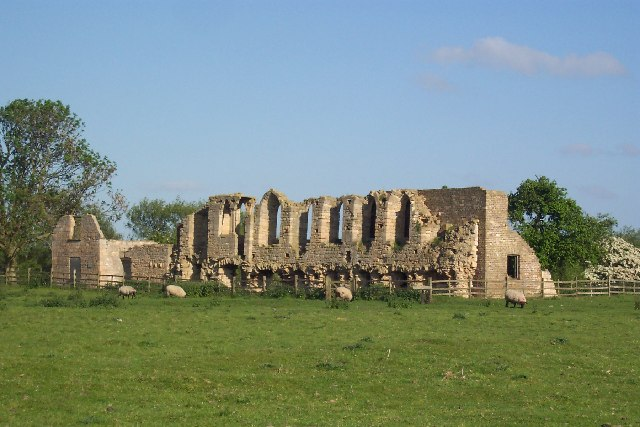
- Tupholme Abbey

- Location within Lincolnshire
- OS grid reference: TF144684
  - London: 120 mi (190 km) S
- Civil parish: Bardney
- District: East Lindsey
- Shire county: Lincolnshire
- Region: East Midlands
- Country: England
- Sovereign state: United Kingdom
- Post town: LINCOLN
- Postcode district: LN3
- Police: Lincolnshire
- Fire: Lincolnshire
- Ambulance: East Midlands
- UK Parliament: Louth and Horncastle (UK Parliament constituency)

Tupholme is a village in the East Lindsey district of Lincolnshire, England. It is situated 11 miles (18 km) east from Lincoln, and is the site of the ruined Tupholme Abbey on the road between Horncastle and Bardney. The population is included in the civil parish of Bucknall.

The Abbey, founded before 1190 by Gilbert and Alan de Neville, was the home of Premonstratensian white canons, numbering around 24 in the 15th century. The ruins chiefly consist of parts of the Early English wall of the refectory with lancet windows, and a reader's pulpit with trefoiled arches.

The site of the abbey was granted to Sir Thomas Heneage of Hainton. Sir Thomas built a grand house, based on the monastic buildings, for his daughter Elizabeth and her husband William Willoughby, 1st Baron Willoughby of Parham. This mansion passed through the Willoughby family until it was sold in 1661 to the Vyner family. Around 1700 the Vyners demolished the Tudor mansion and built a new hall (Tupholme Hall, demolished 1976) nearby. They retained one wall of the medieval abbey/house as an eye-catching ornament in their surrounding parkland.

The notorious slave-owner Thomas Thistlewood was born in Tupholme in 1721.

The site held a Folk Festival in 1970 and 1971, and in 1972 a Rock Festival with Rod Stewart and The Beach Boys.
