= Geoffrey de Neville (died 1225) =

Anglo-Norman baron

- King's Chamberlain
- Died: c.1225
- Father: Alan de Neville

Geoffrey de Neville (died c. 1225) was an English nobleman who served as King's Chamberlain and Seneschal of Gascony and Périgord.

== Life ==
Neville was a younger son of Alan de Neville and a daughter of the lord of Pont Audemer. Neville is first mentioned when King John of England gave him lands in 1204. In 1207, Geoffrey served briefly as a steward of the Household, before he was appointed the King's Chamberlain. He served in 1207 for a short time as Sheriff of Wiltshire and in 1210 he was sent with reinforcements to the Angevin County of Poitou. In 1213, King John sent him as an envoy to Count Raymond VI of Toulouse and King Peter II of Aragón. In 1214 he tried to get the nobles of Poitou to support the campaign of King John. In gratitude for his loyalty, the king gave him some possessions of dispossessed members of the baronial opposition in England. In July and August 1214 Neville served as Seneschal of Gascony and in July and August 1215, as Seneschal of Poitou. Both offices he had to hand over to Reginald de Pontibus.

During the First Barons' War Neville was until 1 October 1215, in the entourage of the king, who gave Neville the Governorship of Scarborough Castle on that day, receiving funds from the king to strengthen the fortifications of the castle. In the winter of 1215–1216 he defended York Castle and York against the troops of the baronial opposition. In early 1216, Neville was appointed Sheriff of Yorkshire, which he remained until 1223. Unlike many other barons, he remained a loyal supporter of the king until the death of King John in October 1216.

In November 1217, Neville was part of the re-recognition of Magna Carta by the regent William Marshal, Earl of Pembroke. In March 1218, he was confirmed as the Sheriff of Yorkshire, remaining the governor of the royal castles of Scarborough and Pickering. In 1218 he was in Worcester when the Welsh prince Llywelyn ap Iorwerth signed a peace treaty with the regency council. In May 1218 he was reappointed seneschal of Gascony, Poitou and Périgord. In Gascony, he put down the rebellion of Hugh X of Lusignan and the Lusignan family, with Niort besieged in 1219. At the end of May 1219, he threatened the government that, in the face of insufficient support from England, he would rather go to the Holy See crusade instead of remaining in Gascony, and in September 1219 he again complained that he had insufficient funds and troops to defend Gascony. In October 1219 he gave William Gauler the administration of Gascony and returned to England, where he reached Dover on 1 November. As seneschal he had taken on debts, which the citizens of different cities of Gascony demanded in 1220.

In England, the government commissioned Neville in 1220 to negotiate with Scotland the marriage of Princess Joan, a sister of King Henry III of England, with King Alexander II of Scotland. On 23 January 1221, the king summoned him to Northampton against the rebellious William de Forz, Earl of Albemarle, who had occupied Fotheringhay Castle. In 1222, he paid the king £100 to obtain guardianship for Alexander de Neville, presumably a second cousin of his and possessions in Lincolnshire, Yorkshire, and Cumberland. On 4 December 1222, he was instructed to verify compliance with the negotiated treaty between Hugh X of Lusignan in Gascony. In 1223, Lusignan complained to the English king of the then Seneschal of Gascony Savary de Mauléon and requested the reinstatement of Neville as Seneschal. The king sent Neville in August 1223 to negotiate with Hugh X of Lusignan in Gascony. In January 1224, Neville had returned to England after his negotiations with Lusignan had been unsuccessful. In May 1224 he was sent with a small force, including at least 15 knights of the royal household, as well as 2000 marks as reinforcement to the County of Poitou, reaching Poitou in June. Neville's small force was not enough to withstand the forces of King Louis VIII of France. Neville returned to England in 1224 after the loss of the County of Poitou. In February 1225, he testified the re-recognition of Magna Carta by King Henry III.

Neville was again sent in March 1225, under the command of Richard of Cornwall in Gascony, where he probably died.

== Marriage and issue ==
Geoffrey de Neville had the following known issue:

- John de Neville (died c.1265)
- Alan de Neville
- Geoffrey de Neville (died 1249), who married a great-granddaughter of Adam fitz Swain.
