= Alan de Neville (forester) =

12th-century English nobleman and royal official

Chief Forester
- In office 1166–1176
- Monarch: King Henry II of England

Personal details
- Died: c. 1176

Alan de Neville (sometimes Alan de Neuville; died c. 1176) was an English nobleman and administrator who held the office of chief forester under King Henry II of England. Before serving the king, Neville was an official of Waleran, Count of Meulan. In 1166, Neville was named chief forester, an office he held until his death. Besides his forest duties, Neville also supported the king during the Becket controversy, and was excommunicated twice by Thomas Becket, the Archbishop of Canterbury. Neville was known for the harshness he displayed in carrying out his forestry office, and at least one monastic chronicle claimed that he "most evilly vexed the various provinces throughout England".

== Early life ==
Alan was a descendant of Gilbert de Neville, a minor landholder in Lincolnshire after the Norman Conquest of England. Domesday Book records Gilbert as holding Walcot in Lincolnshire from Peterborough Abbey. Gilbert was recorded as holding other lands from the Abbey in 1115 and 1125, still in Lincolnshire. Alan had a brother named Gilbert, who witnessed some of his brother's charters.

Alan Neville first appears in the historical record as the butler of Count Waleran of Meulan in 1138. Neville may have been in Waleran's service before this, but this is the first secure appearance. For serving as butler, Neville received rents from the market dues at Pont-Audemer worth 100 shillings annually. He appears as a witness to a charter of Waleran's to the Abbey of Tiron, which is dated sometime before 1141. Neville witnessed ten other of Waleran's charters, ending in the 1150s.

== Royal service ==
In 1153, Neville was serving the future King Henry. In 1156, Neville was exempted from paying danegeld on his lands in Lincolnshire, some of which were lands held previously by Gilbert de Neville. Henry also granted Neville lands around Marlborough around this time, and he may have later had custody of Marlborough Castle, as his son Ives was in charge of work done on the castle in 1176. By 1163, Neville was in charge of hearing the pleas of the forest in Oxfordshire, and possibly also Buckinghamshire, Bedfordshire, Leicestershire, Warwickshire, Cambridgeshire, Huntingdonshire, and Northamptonshire.

Neville was present at the Council of Clarendon, where he was among the king's followers. Neville was one of the witnesses to the Constitutions of Clarendon, which came out of the Council. In 1166, he was named chief forester of the royal forests, an office that was responsible for the royal officials in charge of administrating the forests as well as the system of royal courts that enforced the forest law. Neville headed the royal efforts to enforce the forest law, which banned cutting down timber, clearing new farm fields, poaching, or the creation of enclosures within the royal forest. Any offences against the forest law were subject to monetary fines, which were an important source of royal revenue. The royal forest included not only the forests owned by the king, but also many forests on lands held by other persons. After Neville was appointed chief forester, he was in charge of hearing offences against the forest law and also imposing punishments. His activities were resented by the people subject to forest law.

Neville supported the king during the Becket controversy between the king and Thomas Becket, the Archbishop of Canterbury, and was excommunicated by the archbishop twice. One excommunication occurred when Neville imprisoned one of Becket's chaplains, William of Salisbury, for six months in Corfe Castle in connection with Becket's actions against the king. Neville was absolved from this excommunication by Gilbert Foliot, the Bishop of London, after Neville decided to go on crusade. Becket was angered by the bishop's action, even though Foliot made the absolution contingent on Neville getting a penance from the pope on his way to the Holy Land.

During 1166, Neville was in charge of Staffordshire for the general eyre undertaken in that year and also tried the pleas of the forest for Devonshire and Worcestershire, and perhaps elsewhere. The abbot of Battle Abbey in 1167 sent a monk to plead with Waleran of Meulan to intervene and stop Neville's exactions on the abbot's manors. After the Revolt of 1173–74, Neville was in charge of a forest eyre held from 1176 to 1178, which resulted in fines totaling 12,000 pounds from breaches of the forest law during the revolt. It appears that the king intended this eyre to be a punishment, and used the forest law because it was solely dependent on the king's will rather than being based in customary law.

== Death and legacy ==
Married to the daughter of the lord of Pont Audemer, Neville died around 1176. After his death, the monks of Battle Abbey petitioned the king to have Neville's body buried at their monastery, perhaps hoping through this action to secure some of Neville's estate. The king is supposed to have replied: "I will have his money, you can have his body, the demons of hell his soul." Neville had at least four sons – Ives, Thomas, Ralph, and Geoffrey. Neville may have been the father of Alan de Neville, who was a royal justice. Hugh de Neville, who was chief forest justice under Kings Richard I, John, and Henry III, was probably the grandson of the Chief Forester, the son of Ralph. Neville was succeeded in office by Thomas fitzBernard.

The Chronicle of Battle Abbey claimed that Neville "most evilly vexed the various provinces throughout England with countless and unaccustomed persecutions". The Chronicle also noted that Neville was equally strict in collecting from either clergy or non-clergy. According to the historian Robert Bartlett, Neville's exactions earned him a "reputation for harshness verging on extortion".
