= William Catlyn =

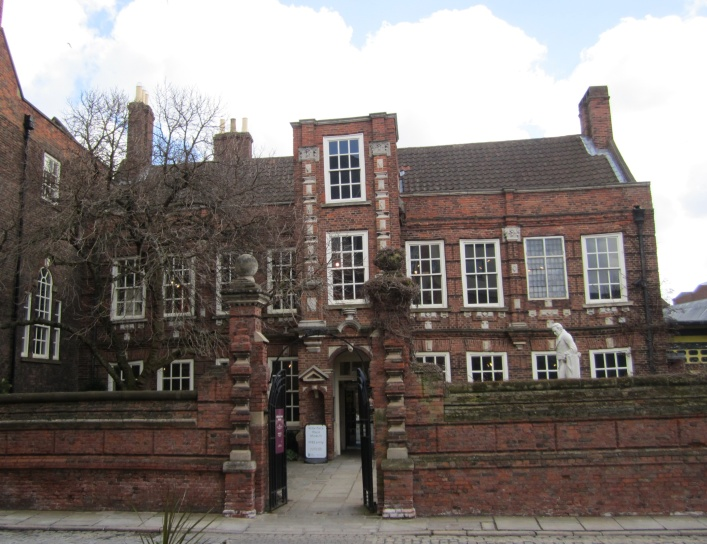
- Wilberforce House, Hull
- Born: 1628 ? Hull, England
- Died: 1683 (aged 54–55); Hull, England
- Occupation: Architect
- Buildings: Crowle House, Crowle Hospital and Wilberforce’s House Hull. Brigg Grammar School, Lincolnshire

William Catlyn (1628–1709) was a Hull architect who worked in the local Artisan Mannerist style, also known as the Humber Brick style. His work, which was greatly influenced by Dutch architecture of the period, survives mainly in Hull and Lincolnshire.

== Architectural work ==
=== Wilberforce House, Hull (attributed to Catlyn) ===
A merchants house, backing onto the river. Its nine-bay rusticated brick front has pilasters to the first floor, stone corinthian capitals and a three-storey porch, with indented pilasters decorated with lozenge-and diamond shaped stone ‘‘jewels’’.

=== Crowle House, Hull. ===
Dated 1664 and the remaining parts are similar to Wilberforce House.

=== The Charterhouse, Hull ===
Catlyn built the Master’s House and Chapel in 1673.

=== Hull Guildhall ===
‘‘Beautified’’ by Catlyn in 1681-2. Destroyed during World War II

=== Hull Market Cross ===
Built 1682 and destroyed during World War II

=== Brigg Grammar School, Wrawby Street, Brigg, Lincolnshire 1674 ===
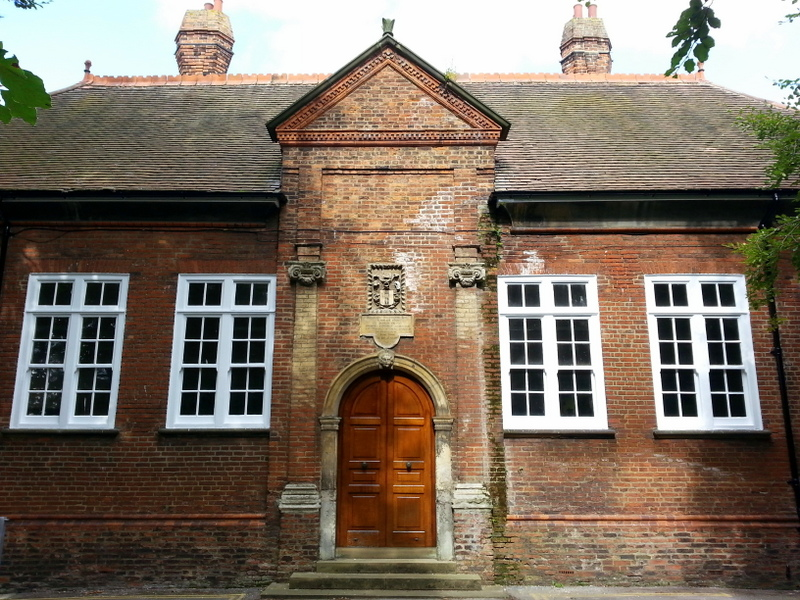
Sir John Nelthorpe School, Brigg

Sir John Nelthorpe commissioned this school from William Catlyn and the contract for building the school was drawn up on 4 July 1674 and it was completed in 1678. A tall, single storeyed front of seven bays and stone quoins. The centre emphasised by Ionic pilasters and stone capitals. The entrance door has a moulded stone round-headed architrave with a small keystone with a cherub's head. Brick pilasters with a plinth and Roman Ionic capitals in stone. Central achievement of arms in stone frame above an inscription commemorating foundation by Sir John Nelthorpe. Modern brick modillion pediment above.

=== Worlaby Hospital, Worlaby, Lincolnshire ===
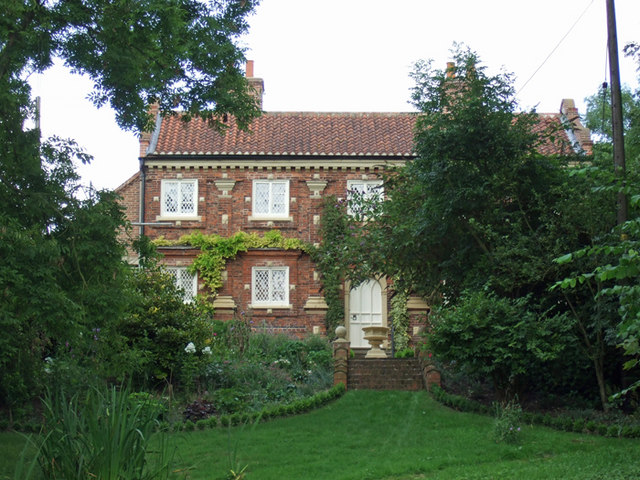
Worlaby Hospital

Built for John, Lord Bellasis, the Governor of Hull. The front is of five bays and two storeys, divided by giant Doric pilasters. Flat projecting surrounds and strange hoods to the doors and to the ground-floor windows. There is a large studded cornice. The building originally had Dutch gables. The Foundation was for four poor widows.

=== Harrington Hall, Lincolnshire (attributed to Catlyn) ===
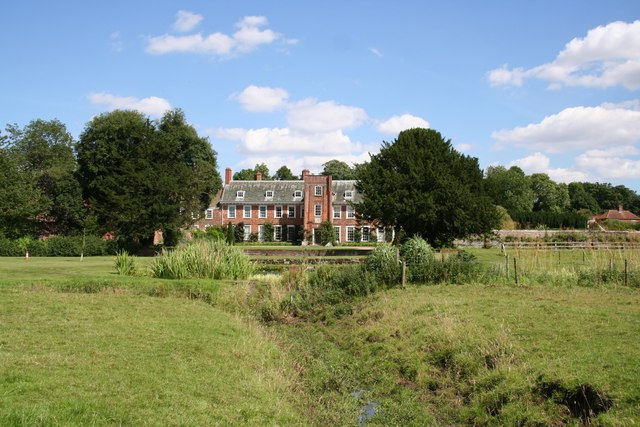
Harrington Hall, Lincolnshire

It has been suggested that alterations to the Hall, which were re-built from 1673, were by William Catlyn. The old porch was dressed up with an Artisan Mannerist facade of exceedingly elongated brick pilasters with Ionic capitals

=== Walcot Old Hall, Alkborough, Lincolnshire. (attributed to Catlyn) ===
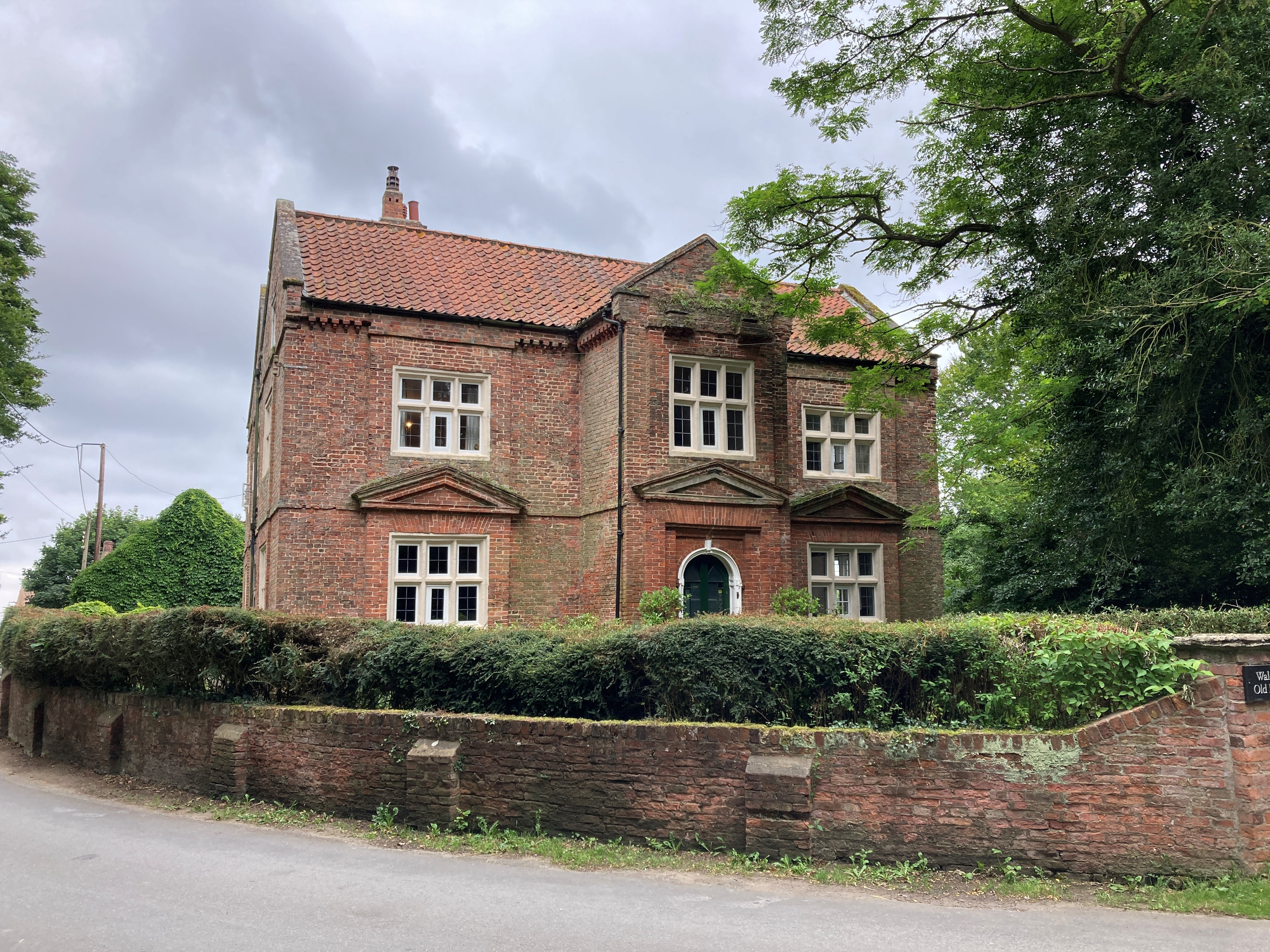
Walcot Old Hall, Walcot

Built for a Hull merchant, Nicholas Denman.

== Literature ==
- Antram N (revised), Pevsner N & Harris J, (1989), The Buildings of England: Lincolnshire, Yale University Press.
- Colvin H. (1995), A Biographical Dictionary of British Architects 1600–1840 Yale University Press, 3rd edition London.
- Louw H.J. (1981), ‘‘Anglo-Netherlandish architectural interchange, c.1600-c.1660’’, Architectural History, Vol. 24, pp. 1–23.
- Neave D. (1996) Artisan Mannerism in North Lincolnshire and East Yorkshire: The work of William Catlyn (1628–1709) of Hull in Sturman C (ed) Lincolnshire Peoples and Places: Essays in Memory of Terence R. Leach (1937–1994), pp. 18–25.
- N Pevsner and D. Neave, The Buildings of England: Yorkshire: York and the East Riding, Yale.
