= Barlings Eau =

River in Lincolnshire, England

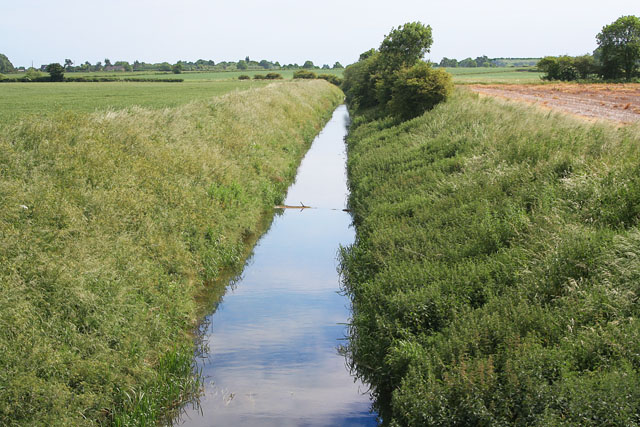
- Barlings Eau to the west of Stainton by Langworth

Location
- Country: England
- Counties: Lincolnshire

Physical characteristics
- Source
  - location: Cold Hanworth
- Mouth
  - location: Short Ferry

Basin features
- Tributaries
  - left: Legsby Beck, Stainton Beck, Goltho Beck, Stainfield Beck
  - right: Welton Beck, Nettleham Beck, Scothern Beck

Barlings Eau is a small river near Barlings, Lincolnshire, England. It is a tributary of the River Witham, joining it near Short Ferry. It acts as the central spine for a number of other small rivers, which drain the low-lying land to either side. Most of its course is within the area managed by the Witham Third District IDB, an Internal Drainage Board responsible for land drainage. One of their pumping stations is on the banks of the river.

There is also an Environment Agency pumping station, which is used to pump water from the River Witham system to the River Ancholme, to maintain flows and water quality when required.

== Route ==
Barlings Eau rises as three streams which join near the medieval village of Cold Hanworth. One rises to the east of Spridlington and flows in a south-easterly direction. A second rises to the north of Faldingworth, flows to the west under the A46 road, and then turns to the south. A third rises to the west of Faldingworth, and again flows west and south to the junction. The first is below the 50-foot (15 m) contour, while the other two start above the 65-foot (20 m) contour. The second one is known as Faldingworth Beck by the Environment Agency, and runs down to Snarford Bridge, but is labelled Barlings Eau on the Ordnance Survey map. At Snarford, it is joined by two other streams from the west, and passes under the A46 at Snarford Bridge.

Below the bridge, it is joined on the left bank by Legsby Beck, which rises in Legsby Wood, to the east of Linwood, and flows in a south-western direction between Faldingworth and Friesthorpe. Welton Beck begins at Old Man's Head Spring, and flows through Welton and Dunholme to join on the right bank. Scothern Beck rises to the west of Scothern, and flows easterly through the village to reach the right bank. When it reaches Stainton by Langworth, it passes under a minor road to Scothern and the Lincoln to Market Rasen railway.

Stainton Beck begins near the higher ground at Sixhills, and flows past Legsby, Lissington, Wickenby, Snelland, and Stainton to join on the left, while Nettleham Beck rises near Lincolnshire Showground, and passes through the university complex at Riseholme, Nettleham, and Sudbrooke to join on the right near Langworth. Barlings Eau passes under the A158 road, crosses Newball Common, and flows along the eastern edge of Barlings Abbey. The Abbey was founded by the Premonstratensian order, known in Britain as the White Canons, in 1156. The remains are quite fragmentary, but parts of the Abbey Church are grade I listed and the remains of the Abbey are grade II listed. The site is a Scheduled Ancient Monument. Two more tributaries join on the let bank, Goltho Beck before the abbey, and Stainfield Beck after it. Just before the river crosses under Ferry Road at Short Ferry Bridge, there is a large Environment Agency pumping station, and a small electric pumping station maintained by the Witham Third District Internal Drainage Board below it. Finally, the river joins the old course of the River Witham, which joins the new course just below Bardney Lock. The old course and the start of Barlings Eau up to Short Ferry Bridge is navigable, and there was a marina at Short Ferry, but the connection to the river channel has been filled in. The former basin is now a lake in a caravan park.

== Land drainage ==
With the exception of a tiny section of two of the streams at the source of the river, its entire course lies within the jurisdiction of the Witham Third District Internal Drainage Board. The upper reaches to below Snarford Bridge and most of the tributaries below that are maintained by the Drainage Board. The main channel below Snarford is a designated main river and is the responsibility of the Environment Agency. The board was originally constituted by an act of Parliament passed in 1762, which created six drainage districts, with responsibility for Draining and Preserving certain Low Lands, called the Fens, lying on both Sides of the River Witham, in the County of Lincoln. On 1 November 1934, the Witham Third District Commissioners amalgamated with the Bardney Drainage Board, the Greetwell District Drainage Commissioners, the Kirkstead Drainage Board, and the River Bain Drainage Board, as a result of the passing of the Land Drainage Act 1930. The board was again re-organised following the passing of the Land Drainage Act 1991, and now consists of 31 members, 15 who are elected by those who pay drainage rates, 14 nominated by councils, and two joint appointments. They are responsible for the drainage of an area which covers 54 square miles (140 km^{2}).

The area around Short Ferry is called Stainfield Fen, and it was first drained as a private venture by landowners. It became part of the Greetwell Drainage District, and a 16 hp (12 kW) steam engine was installed some time before 1881. This was replaced by a 30 hp (22 kW) engine in 1896, which had been scrapped by 1953. There are now no traces of the original buildings, which were located close to the junction with the old course of the Witham. The present Stainfield pumping station, which is situated next to Short Ferry Bridge, contains a 20-inch (51 cm) Allen-Gwynnes electric pump, which was installed in 1959, and which can pump 9.7 million gallons per day (44 Megalitres per day (Mld)). In 1991 this was supplemented by two 10-inch (254 mm) submersible pumps, each capable of pumping 1.1M gal per day (5 Mld), which are located a little to the south-east of the 1959 station.

== Water transfer ==
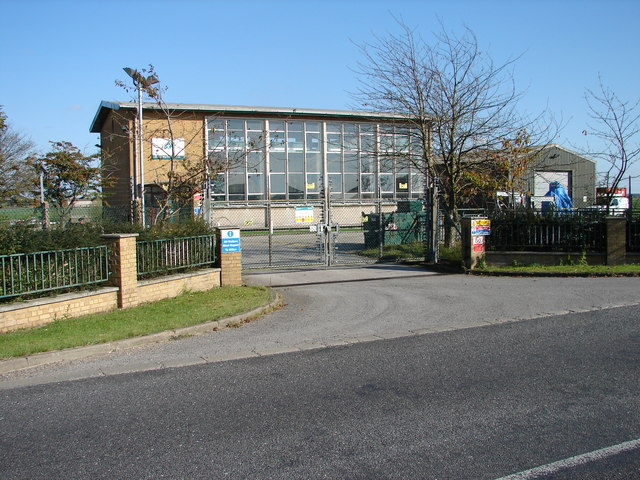
Short Ferry pumping station pumps water to the River Ancholme to maintain its flow.

Just above Short Ferry bridge, the Environment Agency maintain Short Ferry pumping station, which forms part of the Trent Witham Ancholme Transfer Scheme. This is designed to manage flows and levels in the River Ancholme during dry weather and the summer months, so that the large volume abstracted from the river, particularly for the public drinking water supply, can be maintained, and the water quality is not compromised by ingress of salt water from the Humber. The pumping station pumps water through an 11-mile (18 km) pipeline to Toft Newton reservoir, on the upper reaches of the Ancholme. The reservoir covers an area of 41 acres (16.5 ha) and can hold enough water to maintain the Ancholme for up to seven days, in the event of a failure of the pumps at Short Ferry.

If flows in Barlings Eau or the Witham are insufficient to supply the required volumes, extra water is delivered to the Witham by Trent pumping station, near Torksey Lock. This pumps water through a short pipeline and into the Foss Dyke. It then flows for 10.8 miles (17.4 km) along the Foss Dyke to Brayford Pool and so into the Witham, to supplement the water available for pumping. The scheme was commissioned in 1974, and the volume of water transferred varies with the weather conditions. In 1987, it was 2,425 megalitres (533×10^{6} imp gal), while in 1979 it was 17,425 megalitres (3,833×10^{6} imp gal).

== Water quality ==
The Environment Agency measures the water quality of the river systems in England. Each is given an overall ecological status, which may be one of five levels: high, good, moderate, poor and bad. There are several components that are used to determine this, including biological status, which looks at the quantity and varieties of invertebrates, angiosperms and fish. Chemical status compares the concentrations of various chemicals against known safe concentrations and is rated good or fail. Barlings Eau and all of its tributaries are designated as "heavily modified", which means that the channels have been altered by human activity, and the criteria for this designation are defined by the Water Framework Directive.

The water quality of the Barlings Eau system was as follows in 2019.

Section	Ecological Status	Chemical Status	Length	Catchment	Channel
Barlings Eau – Upper	Moderate	Fail	5.3 miles (8.5 km)	9.00 square miles (23.3 km^{2})	heavily modified
Faldingworth Beck	Moderate	Fail	5.0 miles (8.0 km)	10.90 square miles (28.2 km^{2})	heavily modified
Scothern Beck	Poor	Fail	4.6 miles (7.4 km)	5.79 square miles (15.0 km^{2})	heavily modified
Legsby (Lissington) Beck	Moderate	Fail	8.6 miles (13.8 km)	10.82 square miles (28.0 km^{2})	heavily modified
Nettleham Beck	Moderate	Fail	7.9 miles (12.7 km)	9.82 square miles (25.4 km^{2})	heavily modified
Goltho Beck	Moderate	Fail	4.6 miles (7.4 km)	5.39 square miles (14.0 km^{2})	heavily modified
Stainfield Beck	Moderate	Fail	6.2 miles (10.0 km)	7.21 square miles (18.7 km^{2})	heavily modified
Barlings Eau	Moderate	Fail	8.6 miles (13.8 km)	44.46 square miles (115.2 km^{2})	heavily modified

Like many rivers in the UK, the chemical status changed from good to fail in 2019, due to the presence of polybrominated diphenyl ethers (PBDE) and mercury compounds, neither of which had previously been included in the assessment.

== Points of interest ==
Point	Coordinates (Links to map resources)	OS Grid Ref	Notes
Source	53.3515°N 0.4737°W	TF016849	
Source	53.3574°N 0.3846°W	TF076857	
Source	53.3481°N 0.4086°W	TF060846	
A46 Snarford Bridge	53.3203°N 0.4261°W	TF049815	
Stainton by Langworth railway bridge	53.2828°N 0.4131°W	TF058773	
Barlings Abbey	53.2472°N 0.3663°W	TF091734	
Junction with Old River Witham	53.2277°N 0.3575°W	TF097713	mouth

== Bibliography ==
- Alderton, Alison (June 2009). WW Guide to the Witham and Fossdyke. Waterways World. ISSN 0309-1422.
- Hinde, K. S. G. (2006). Fenland Pumping Engines. Landmark Publishing Ltd. ISBN 978-1-84306-188-5.
- Itinerary (7 June 1996). Lincolnshire Catchment Panel Field Visit (PDF). Environment Agency. Archived (PDF) from the original on 4 March 2016.
