= Grange de Lings =

Civil parish in Lincolnshire, England

Coordinates: 53.2834°N 0.520°W

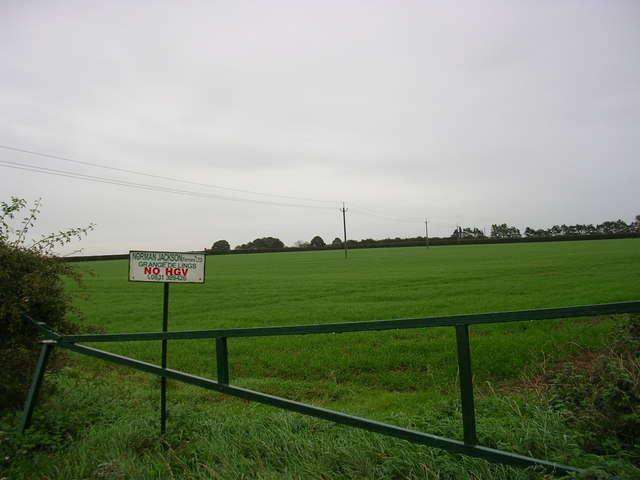
- Farmland at Grange de Lings

- Location within Lincolnshire
- Population: 452 2001 census with Riseholme
  - London: 125 mi (201 km) S
- Civil parish: Grange de Lings
- District: West Lindsey
- Shire county: Lincolnshire
- Region: East Midlands
- Country: England
- Sovereign state: United Kingdom
- Post town: LINCOLN
- Postcode district: LN2
- Dialling code: 01522
- Police: Lincolnshire
- Fire: Lincolnshire
- Ambulance: East Midlands
- UK Parliament: Gainsborough

Grange de Lings is a civil parish in the West Lindsey district of Lincolnshire, England. It is situated 3 miles (5 km) north from the city centre of the county town of Lincoln.

Grange de Lings is often quoted as the address for the Lincolnshire Showground, just off the west of the A15, but the parish actually lies entirely east of the A15, and the Lincolnshire Showground is in the parish of North Carlton. The parish is sometimes hyphenated as Grange-de-Lings.

The north-western corner of the parish is at the A1500 junction with the A15, at a roundabout. The boundary follows Horncastle Lane eastwards where it neighbours Welton, to the north. At Dunholme, it follows southwards across the old runways of RAF Dunholme Lodge, of which the western end was in Grange de Lings. It briefly meets Scothern, and a small section of the parish extends between Scothern and Nettleham, to meet the A46, which it follows for around 200 metres. The boundary with Nettleham passes westwards, then south-west across Hall Lane, then meets Riseholme, where it follows a line due west to the A15 (Ermine Street), meeting South Carlton just south of the pylons across the A15. The western boundary of the parish is the A15, and just north of Watering Dyke Houses, it meets North Carlton at the perimeter fence of the Lincolnshire Showground (wholly outside the parish).

There is an oil well in the north of the parish, next to the boundary with Welton, part of the East Midlands Oil Province.

The parish has no parish church, but is part of the St Mary's church in the Riseholme with Grange de Lings parish, looked after by Nettleham parish, where the vicar is based. Grange-de-Lings in this respect is known as an extra-parochial district.

For statistical and administrative purposes, it is joined with Riseholme (similar to the religious parish)
