= Lawress Wapentake =

Ancient subdivision of Lincolnshire, England

According to Whites 1856 Lincolnshire, Lawress Wapentake was one of the south-western divisions of the parts of Lindsey, in the Deanery and Archdeaconry of Stow, and consisting of the East Division and the West Division.

At the time of the Domesday survey in 1086, the wapentake of Lawress included Lincoln and some surrounding areas that were separated in the "fifth year of the reign of Edward IV" (1465/66) to become the Lincoln Liberty. The adjoining wapentake of Langoe also separated parishes; the village of Branston, located four Miles south of Lincoln, was formerly the seat of the Liberty of Lincoln.

Approximately 6 miles by 14 miles in size, and bounded on the south by Lincoln, Langoe and Boothby Graffoe Wapentakes (although the correct spelling in 1856 was Graffo), on the west by Well Wapentake and parts of Nottinghamshire, on the north by Walshcroft and Aslacoe, and on the east by Wraggoe Wapentake.

Crossed by the Lincolnshire Wolds, and Ermine Street, and having the Fossdyke and River Witham on its south and east borders, it consisted of 25 Parishes (W in brackets indicates West Division):

- Aisthorpe (W)
- Barlings with Langworth
- Brattleby (W)
- Broxholme (W)
- Burton (W)
- Buslingthorpe
- North Carlton (W)
- South Carlton (W)
- Dunholme
- Faldingworth
- Fiskerton
- Friesthorpe
- Greetwell
- Nettleham
- Reepham
- Riseholme
- Saxilby with Ingleby (W)
- Scampton (W)
- Scothern
- Snarford
- Sudbrook
- Thorpe (West) (W)
- Torksey with Hardwick
- Brampton (W)
- Welton
- Cherry Willingham

Whites also notes that Chief Constables are Mr William Slieghtholme of Scampton (for the West Division) and Mr Samuel Pilley of Sudbrooke (for the East Division)
