= Welton, Lincolnshire =

Village and civil parish in the West Lindsey district of Lincolnshire, England

Welton Welton-by-Lincoln
- Village and civil parish
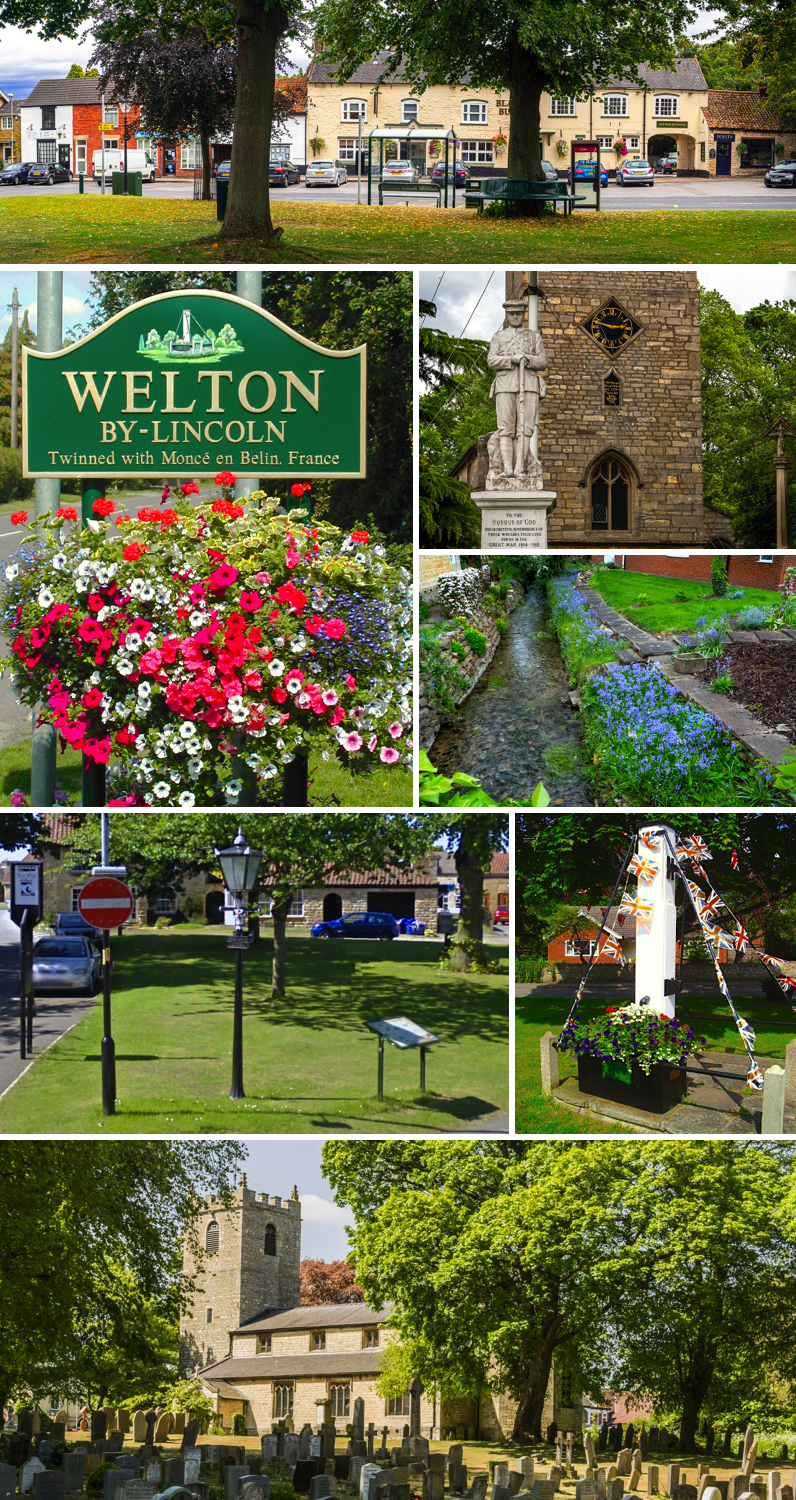
- Clockwise from top: Welton centre; the war memorial in front of St Mary's Church; Welton Beck; village pump; St Mary's Church with cemetery in foreground; Victoria's jubilee lamp; village sign on Lincoln Road

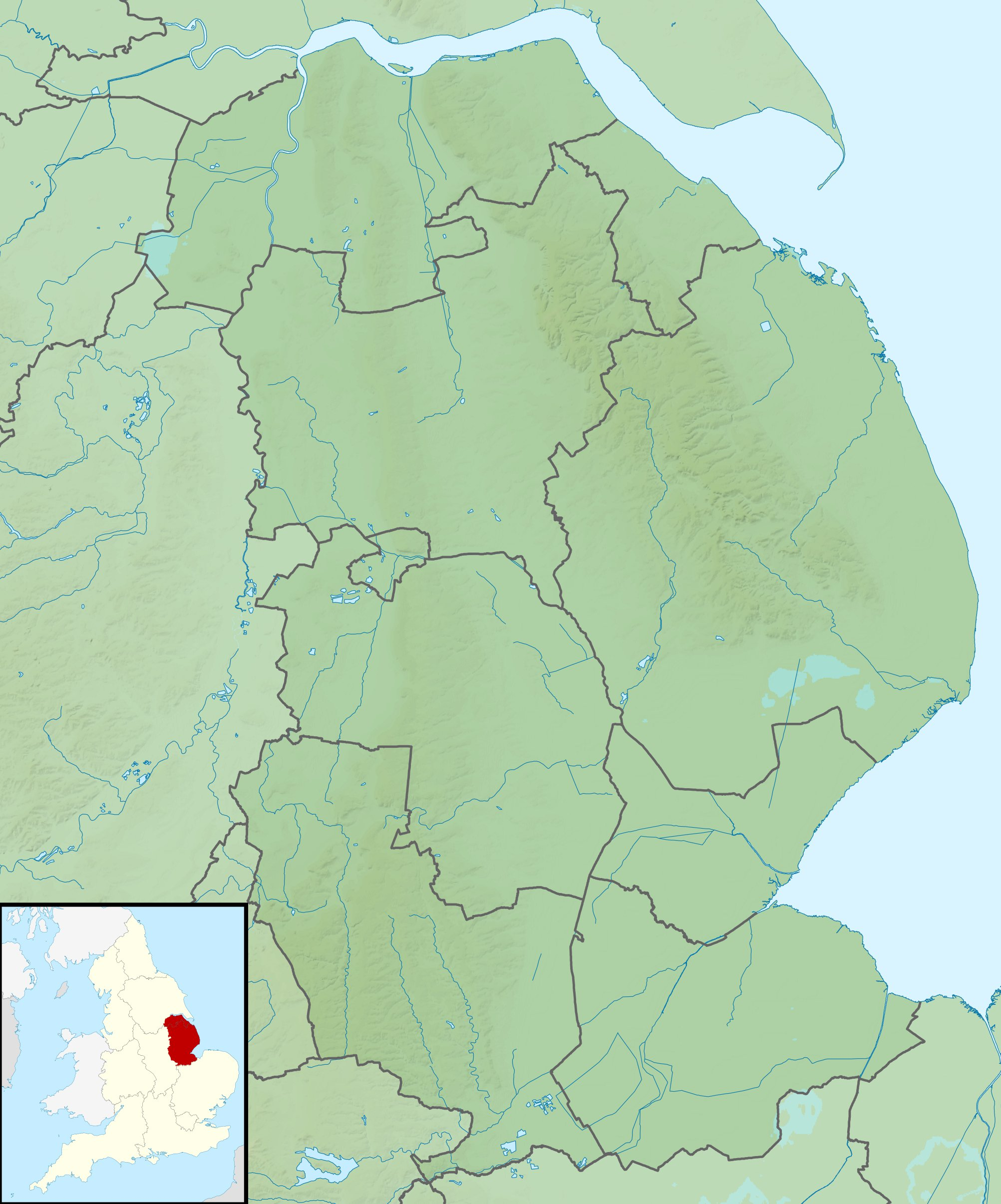
- Location within Lincolnshire Location within England
- Coordinates: 53.302878°N 0.475938°W
- Sovereign state: United Kingdom
- Country: England
- Region: East Midlands
- County: Lincolnshire
- District: West Lindsey
- Constituency: Gainsborough
- Ward: Welton and Dunholme
- Civil parish: Welton; Dunholme

Government
  - Body: Welton Parish Council
  - Chairman: Graham Briggs
  - Vice-Chairman: Marlene Chapman

Area
  - Total (CP): 16 km^{2} (6.2 sq mi)
  - Water: 1.2 km^{2} (0.46 sq mi)
  - Urban: 3.5 km^{2} (1.4 sq mi)

Population (2011)
  - Total (CP): 4,327
  - Density: 270/km^{2} (700/sq mi)
- Demonym(s): Welletonian, Weltoner, Weltonese
- Time zone: UTC±0 (Greenwich Mean Time)
  - Summer (DST): UTC+1 (British Summer Time)
- Postcode district: LN2
- Post town: Lincoln
- Dialling code: 01673
- Police Fire Ambulance: Lincolnshire; Lincolnshire; East Midlands
- OS grid reference • London: TF015795; 202 km (126 mi) S
- Website: www.welton-by-lincoln-pc.gov.uk

Welton (/ˈwɛltən/; or Welton by Lincoln) is a large village and civil parish in the West Lindsey district of Lincolnshire, England. The population of the civil parish was recorded as 4,327 in the 2011 census. It is geographically situated 6 miles (9.7 km) north from Lincoln, near the A46, and serves as a hub for surrounding rural communities. The qualifier "by Lincoln" distinguishes it from similarly named Lincolnshire villages, including Welton le Wold and Welton le Marsh.

The modern civil parish encompasses the main settlement alongside the hamlets of Ryland, Welton Hill, and Welton Cliff. Historically within the wapentake of Lawress, the community appears in the Domesday Book as Welletone, recorded as having 52 households and six prebendal estates connected to Lincoln Cathedral. The village centre has been described as possessing picturesque and quintessentially English qualities, featuring several Grade II listed structures, centred on the parish church of St Mary, alongside the eponymous Welton Beck. The spring feeding the beck is considered the origin of the village's name, derived from the Old English for "spring or stream settlement" (from wella and tūn). The settlement is additionally characterised as a wildlife haven owing to its open green spaces, as well as a community with a strong tradition of philanthropic work, historically centred around its parish church, local educational endowments, and community initiatives. To protect this historic character and architectural heritage, the village was designated a conservation area in November 1969. Welton provides secondary education to surrounding parishes with William Farr School, a comprehensive school established by the titular parish vicar in 1952 on the site of the former RAF Dunholme Lodge airbase.

== Toponymy ==
The name means, roughly, "town with a stream", with the suffix 'ton' being from the Saxon term 'tūn' for an enclosure, and 'wel' coming from the Anglo-Saxon 'wella' a place of springing or bubbling waters, possibly referencing the nearby Old Man's Head spring, the source of the Welton Beck. For this reason, it is unlikely to refer to the pump and formerly well on the southern green.

Historically, the village has been known by many diverse names and spelling variations. Most famously in 1086, the Domesday Book registered the area as 'Welletone'. Later names include 'Welletonam' as early as 1070, 'Welton Davy Bekhall' in 1291, 'Welleton cum Kirketon' in 1292, 'Wolteme Brynthall' in 1349, and 'Welton Askeby Payneshill' in 1428. Many refer to the prebends, as they were sometimes seen as similarly significant to the town itself. In relation to the neighbouring hamlet of Dunholme, the area was also called 'Welton iuxta Downeham' and 'Welton nigh Dunham' in 1583 and 1661 respectively, amongst other names.

The town has also been known as Welton by Lincoln or Welton-by-Lincoln, (Note: and rarely, usually only in stylistic context, such as on the village sign as 'Welton by-Lincoln') amongst other variations, (Note: including Welton near Lincoln) to clearly differentiate it from the multitude of other settlements with a variation of the name Welton, including four within just 50 km (30 mi): Welton with Melton, Welton le Wold Welton le Marsh, and Little Welton, near Louth.

== History ==
The village does have an ancient well, later completed with a Victorian pump. Though the more famous pump is located on a small grassy triangle between Sudbeck Lane and Lincoln Road, there are other old wells with their own functioning pumps elsewhere. Before the Anglo-Saxon inhabitation, there is evidence of both Roman and Celtic settlement from about 7,500 years ago, with coins and fragments of pottery serving as evidence of a Roman farmstead. An evaluation undertaken immediately south of the parish church and near to a known Saxon cemetery, revealed Roman remains and artefacts, and recovered fragments of early-mid Saxon and medieval pottery in 2007. Another evaluation in 2007 at Heathclinic House recorded a late Saxon ditch and a series of medieval pits and ditches. Artefacts from the 12th century and later were noted to be fairly abundant, indicating probable domestic occupation of the site at that time.

Roman building debris, pottery scatter, stamped pottery, stamped tiles, and Roman coins were found on numerous occasions. Air photographs also indicated Roman site around the former hamlet. An Anglo-Saxon inhumation cemetery, a Bronze Age tanged and barbed arrowhead found, and a Neolithic stone axe were all found in Ryland too.

By 1086, the Domesday Book recorded as many as 52 households, and named the village "Welletone". It was at this time that the medieval fishpond complex beside the Welton Beck was in use.

Welton School was built by subscription in 1826, and by 1881 it had about 130 students. In 1889, it was rebuilt to accommodate 167 students. The site of the school has since become residential, but can be remembered by the symbolically named Old School Yard Passage directly adjacent to the building. In 1881, the parish was entitled to send eleven boys to Christ's Hospital (or Blue Coat) School in Lincoln.

By a scheme of the Charity Commissioners for the re-appropriation of the endowments of Christ's Hospital school, in Lincoln, five exhibitions of £20 yearly are open to scholars of Welton elementary school and tenable at the Lincoln Middle school; the amount of each exhibition to be applied, first to the payment of tuition fees, and then for the maintenance and benefit of the scholar; under the same scheme the sum of £50 yearly is to be paid to the Welton Christ's Hospital endowment fund and to be applied by the governors as follows: £10 in maintaining scholarships each of not less than £1 yearly, tenable at the parish elementary school, to be awarded in equal shares to boys and girls who are and have been for at least three years in such school and £40 in maintaining exhibitions of £20 each yearly, tenable for four years at any place of education, higher than elementary, approved by the Welton governors, to be awarded to girls who are and have been for at least three years in the Welton elementary school.

— Kelly's Directory of Lincolnshire (1896)

The vicarage was recorded as discharged in 1848, meaning that as it valued in the king's books at 7 pounds, 6 shillings, and 8 pence, it fell below £10 and was therefore exempt from having to pay the First Fruits and Tenths according to law created by Henry VIII, and confirmed by Elizabeth I.

In 1863, a number of apparently Saxon graves were discovered on the site of an old chapel cemetery. Roman remains have also said to have been found in the village as well.

Bastardy cases would be heard in the Lincoln petty session hearings on the first and third Fridays of each month.

There is significant recorded personal charity for the poor through the local parish church, St Mary's, as well a history of other resources for the poor. In 1664, Thomas Codd left 20 shillings per year for the poor, and four year later in 1668, a Mrs Leary left 10 shillings per year. However, by 1881, all knowledge as to what land generated Leary's income was lost and the grant left undone. In 1716, Elizabeth Croft left 20 shillings a year to the poor. The Common Lands were enclosed in the parish around 1771. In 1824, John Camm left the interest from £500 for the poor, which was combined with about £11, 10 shillings a year recorded as chiefly the gift of Earl Brownlow by 1848, to supply about £20 to the poor per annum. Renowned philanthropist Sarah Greville, Countess of Warwick left £10 per annum to the vicar of Welton for delivering a lecture in the church every Sunday evening. The Poor Law Amendment Act 1834 made the parish part of the Lincoln Poor Law Union, and in 1881, it still held the right to send one poor man to Market Rasen Hospital.

During the Cold War, a Royal Observer Corps underground monitoring post for nuclear reporting was operated in Ryland. A similar post can be found at the site of the former RAF Dunholme Lodge to the south-west.

William Farr School was opened inside the parish as a secondary modern school in 1952, on a site purchased for £600 from RAF Dunholme Lodge in 1946 by Rev William Farr, then vicar of Welton. The school was named after him when he died in 1955. Five years later in 1960, the old former wartime buildings were replaced, with the new site straddling the southern parish border with Dunholme. The school acquired comprehensive status in 1974, became grant-maintained in 1992, and as part of their trip to Welton in 1996, Queen Elizabeth II and Prince Philip visited to open the new Humanities building.

In 2000 William Farr signed up for the latest education initiative and attained Technology College status. In 2001 they achieved the distinction of having the best comprehensive school A-level results in England, and in 2006 it received an outstanding award in every category in an Ofsted inspection, one of the best in the country. It is now an academy and is also an associate school of the University of Lincoln.

Welton also has a not-for-profit magazine, Welton News, which has published monthly since June 1999, nearing 300 issues as of 2022. More than 2,000 copies of each issue are distributed free-of-charge to every household in Welton by a group of volunteers. The magazine was edited by Hugh Gilfedder for over 15 years, until his retirement in 2019, when he was succeeded by Dorothy Russell. Gilfedder was also responsible for the donating two new trees to be planted in the village the same year.

The village floral displays were planted in a purple, cream and green theme in 2018 to reflect the colours of the Suffragette movement, commemorating the 100th anniversary of when women first won the vote.

=== 1987 Red Arrows crash ===
On 16 November 1987 at 12:45 pm, two of RAF Scampton's Red Arrows, Hawks XX259 and XX241, called Reds 1 and 2, piloted by Flt Lt MJ "Spike" Newbury and Sqn Ldr Tim Miller respectively, experienced a mid-air wing tip collision during a winter display practice. Red 2 collided with Red 1 after the air brake failed to operate. Red 1 slammed into houses on Monce Close and Red 2 landed in a field, just metres away from a row of houses. Both pilots ejected, but Sqdn Ldr Miller suffered injuries to his back, and Flt Lt Newbury suffered a broken leg – both had to be taken to Lincoln County Hospital for treatment. Amazingly, nobody was killed in the incident, as the occupants of the house on Monce Close at the epicentre of the crash were all out at the time of the accident. Gillian Schooley had gone to Lincoln while her young daughter was at play school. One neighbour, James Bray was in the bath when the plane crashed next door, while another, Charles Gillon, said he dived for cover after seeing the planes collide, roll over, and burst into flames from his bedroom window.

Both aircraft had to be written off after the accident due to their near total destruction. Red 2 had been on loan to the Red Arrows from No. 4 Flying Training School RAF.

In the immediate aftermath of the crash, there were calls for the Red Arrows to be barred from practising over populated areas, as the team had only been stationed at RAF Scampton for three years. Welton Parish Council chairman Malcolm Parish supported the relocation of the team. Some suggested the team practise over the sea, but were quickly dismissed. Many of Lincolnshire's members of parliament, including Gainsborough MP Sir Edward Leigh, insisted all families affected by the crash should be fully compensated.

Due to being the first in a spree of accidents involving the Red Arrows, with one three months later leading to the death of a pilot and the banning of any future aerobatic displays by the group, some suggested that the Red Arrows were jinxed.

== Prebends of Welton ==
When Lincoln Cathedral was first built, Welton's owner, William the Conqueror, gave the parish to the bishop to endow six prebends which provided income to support six canons attached to the cathedral. These were subsequently confirmed by William II and Henry I. The prebends were:

- Beckhall
- Brinkhall
- Gorehall
- Painshall
- Rivehall
- Westhall

The "H" preceding "all" is silent and not to be pronounced.

Some of the roads in the village have been named after them: Brinkhall Way, Beckhall, Rivehall Avenue, Westhall Road, Painshall Close, Gorehall Drive, and even Prebend Lane. However, there is not necessarily any geographical connection between the original prebends and the streets named after them.

=== Toponymy ===
These would generally have been named after manors, hence the suffix 'hall'. Despite Gorehall's particularly gruesome sounding name, it in fact simply originates from gāra, "a triangular plot of ground". Rivehall is described as 'manor-house associated with the reeve', a form of local magistrate and real estate manager. Beckhall is a compound of 'bekkr' and 'hall', meaning the manor by the beck. Brinkhall is formed from brink, as in 'the edge of a bank' and hall. Painshall is believed to come from an individual's name, which may have been Pain, or from historical names for the prebend, it could be Paganus, Pene, Pane, Pan, Panus, Payne, Pounce, or Paunch. Westhall is simply named for being located in the west, and has never had any other known names or spelling variations.

== Attractions ==
The Church of St Mary is by far the most well known landmark in the village, with its long, interesting history and numerous listed structures including the celebrated war memorial. There have also been chapels in Welton for the Wesleyan Methodists, the Free Church, the Primitive Methodists and the Reform Methodists, but now only the Wesleyan chapel is still in use, known as the Welton & Dunholme Methodist Church.

=== St Mary's Church ===
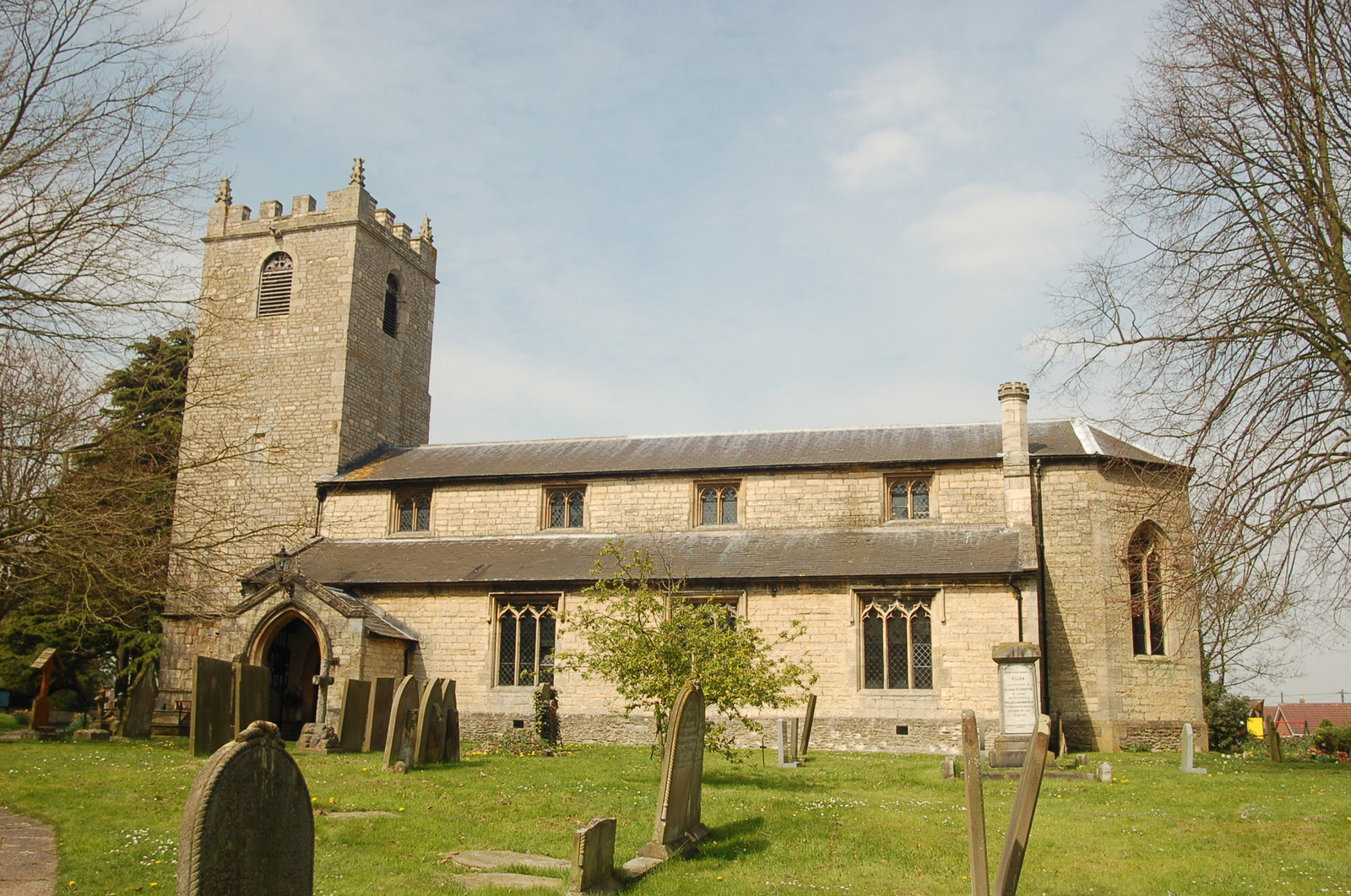
St Mary's Church from the southern churchyard

The village church, the Prebendal Church of St Mary, was originally Norman, but only a few fragments of this survive in the tower walls; the present building is in the Early English style from around 1250. Apart from the pillars and arches within the church, most of the church is not the original Norman one. After it burnt down in 1442, the tower was rebuilt in 1768 (Note: or 1770) and the body of the church in 1823 and 1824. The large cemetery to the south and east has likely been in use since as long as the church, though most graves from earlier than the 1700s have been lost to time, with tragically few surviving from even as far back as that. The choir vestry was added onto the north side in 1921 in memory of Bishop Edward King. Above and behind the baptismal font, on the west wall of the tower, hang the hatchments, the Royal Coat of Arms of King George III, dated 1838, which interestingly, in the year after William IV's death and Victoria's accession, do not carry the name of the monarch. Below the arms is an oil painting of the Holy family by Florentine artist Carlo Falcini Depinse, dated 1847, given to the church in 1925. Until its removal in 1876, there was a gallery up against the west wall, which would have been used by the orchestra to provide music for the services until 1851. The box pews were removed in 1888 and 1890, at the same time as the chancel was refitted, replaced with pine benches which now seat 250. The total cost of all these improvements came to £613.

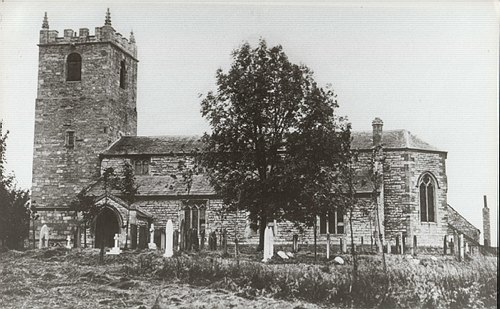
St Mary's from the churchyard, around 1910–12

The six church bells were cast by Henry Harrison, nephew of John Harrison the carpenter, clockmaker, and inventor of the marine chronometer. Henry was born in 1732 and cast the Welton bells in 1770. He was also commissioned to hang the bells at York Minster in 1733.

The church was struck by lightning in the autumn of 1847, and one person killed, and many others injured. In year, the south-western pinnacle atop the bell tower fell into the churchyard during a storm, though it was replaced shortly after. The building became Grade II* listed on 30 November 1966.

A copy of the Act of Parliament for Welton, and the original Enclosure Award, are in the church chest. The Anglican parish register dates from 1562 for baptisms, 1568 for marriages and 1575 for burials.

The Reverened William Farr was buried in the church yard after his death in the 1955, with his wooden gravestone making a small landmark at the church. The wooden marker was restored by year 12 students at William Farr School in 2021.

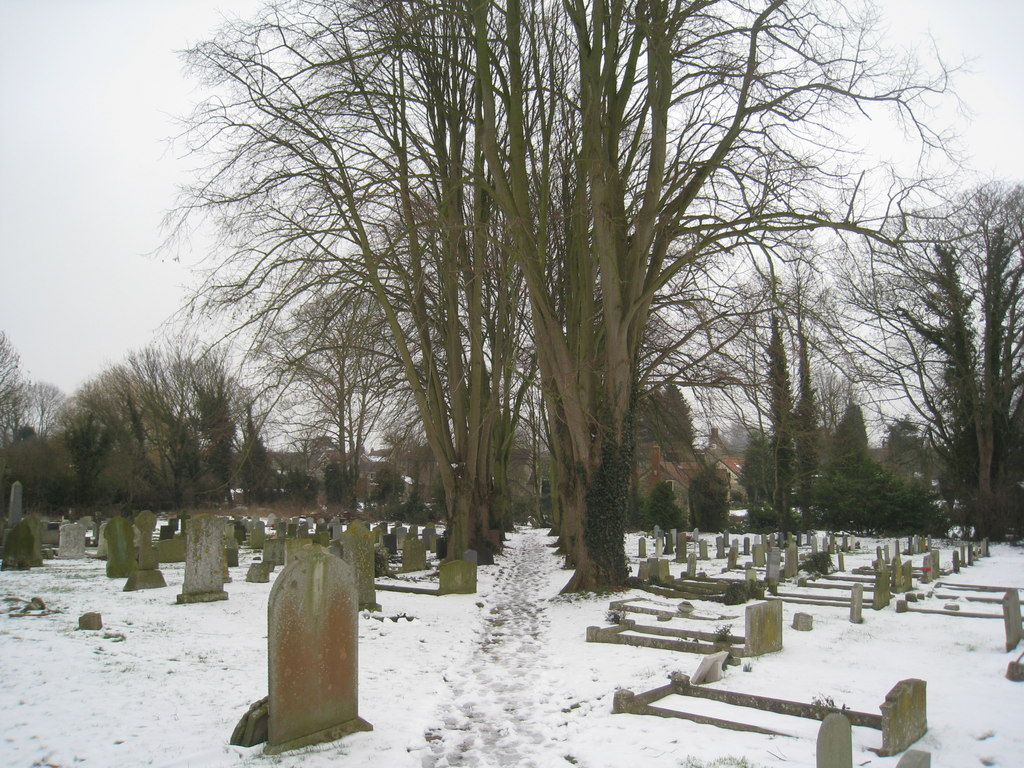
The churchyard at St Mary's

The tall ashlar cross near the war memorial in St Mary's churchyard, was erected in 1910 in memory of Dr Richard Smith, founder of Lincoln Bluecoats School, and became Grade II listed on 21 June 1985. Smith was born in Welton in about 1533, and later died there in 1602. He was also notable for being the physician to Lord Burleigh at the court of Elizabeth I. Smith also has a brass plaque and a stained glass window in the church dedicated to his memory, which was designed and made by Burlison & Grylls in 1917.

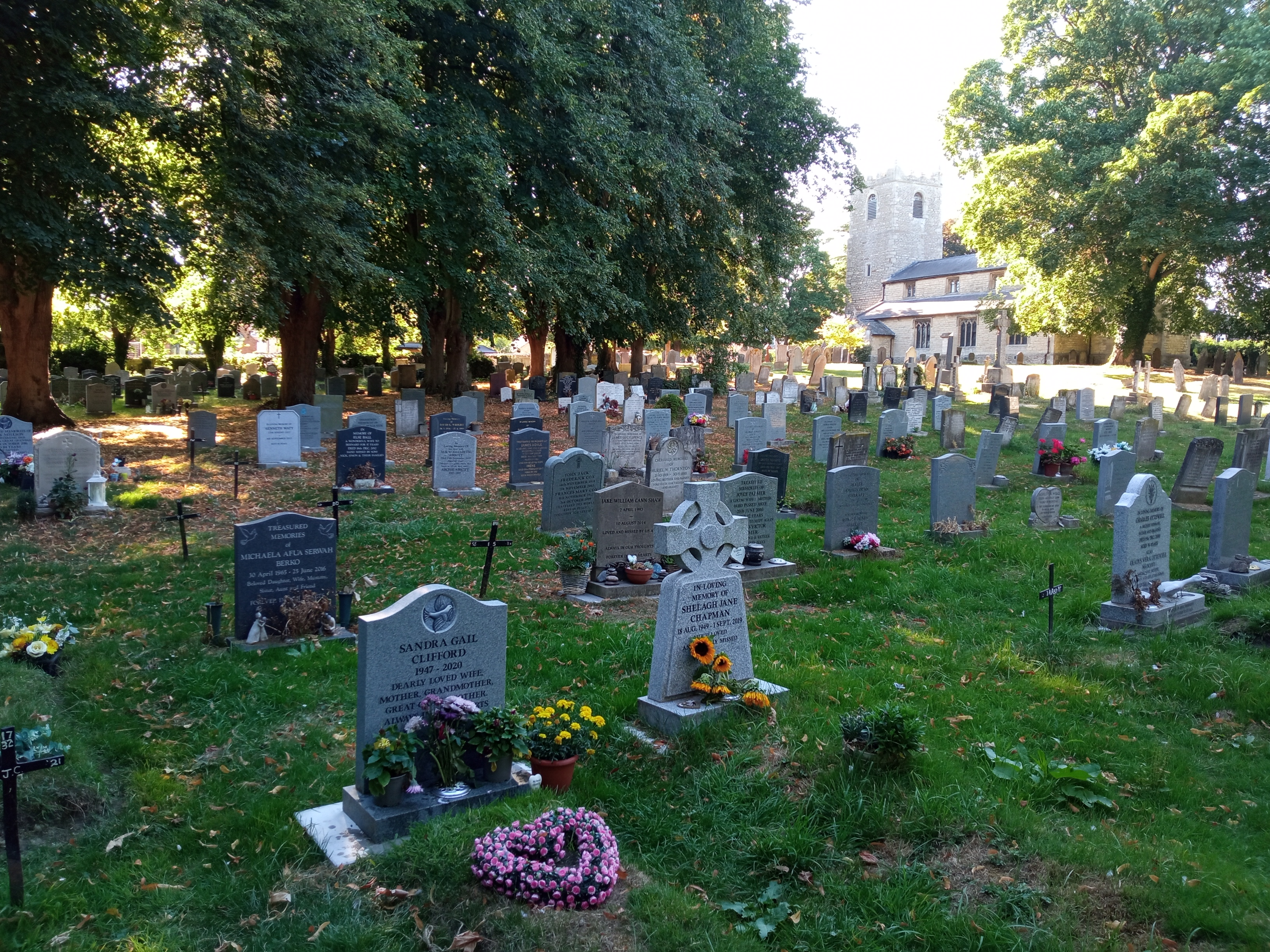
Cemetery in Saint Mary's church in Welton.

The other large stained glass window is a memorial window to the men and women of the Royal Air Force, Royal Flying Corps, and the Royal Naval Air Service, (Note: Interestingly referred to as the RNFC (presumably Royal Naval Flying Corps) in many sources, despite such a name having never been used by the British Armed Forces) also designed and made by Burlison & Grylls in London, in 1919 and unveiled by the Bishop of Lincoln on 10 May 1921. It is said to be one of the oldest stained windows dedicated to the British Armed Forces.

A third listed structure in the churchyard is a pair of ashlar headstones to Robert Camm, who died 1781, and his wife Elizabeth, who died 1788. The two became jointly Grade II listed on 21 June 1985.

On 17 September 2014, a Black Mulberry tree was planted in the churchyard by Charles Hood, Deputy Lieutenant on behalf of HM The Lord-Lieutenant of Lincolnshire in commemoration of those who served in the First World War.

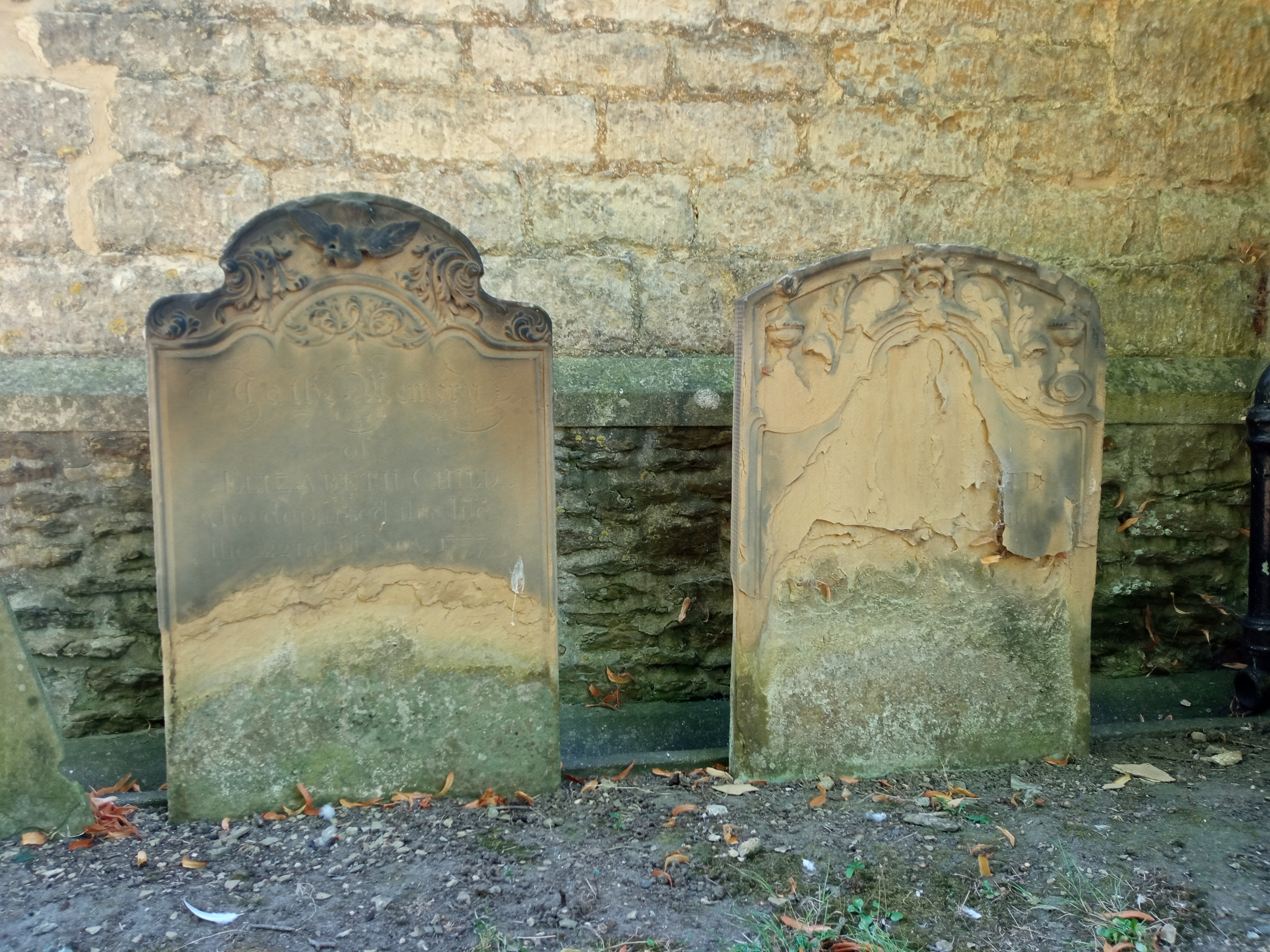
2 Gravestones At East End Of Church Of St Mary

The Welton PCC is now also creating a remembrance garden in 2015 in the south-east corner of the churchyard after being awarded nearly £1,812 from the Lincolnshire Co-op's Community Champions award scheme.

Nowadays, the church is still very active with many charitable events such as the Welton Larder, with free food for any in need, even providing free delivery, and spreading awareness for global issues such as the ongoing climate crisis. The current reverend is Revd. Lynne Hawkins. The church forms part of the benefice of Welton's St Mary's, Dunholme's St Chad's and Scothern's St Germain's churches, who come together for joint prayers under the 'Threechurchespray' scheme.

With a donation of £10, all of which goes towards the upkeep of the church, the floodlights around its base can be sponsored for an occasion.

St Mary's Church is also responsible for the running of the next-door charity shop, "The Mustard Seed".

==== Welton War Memorial ====
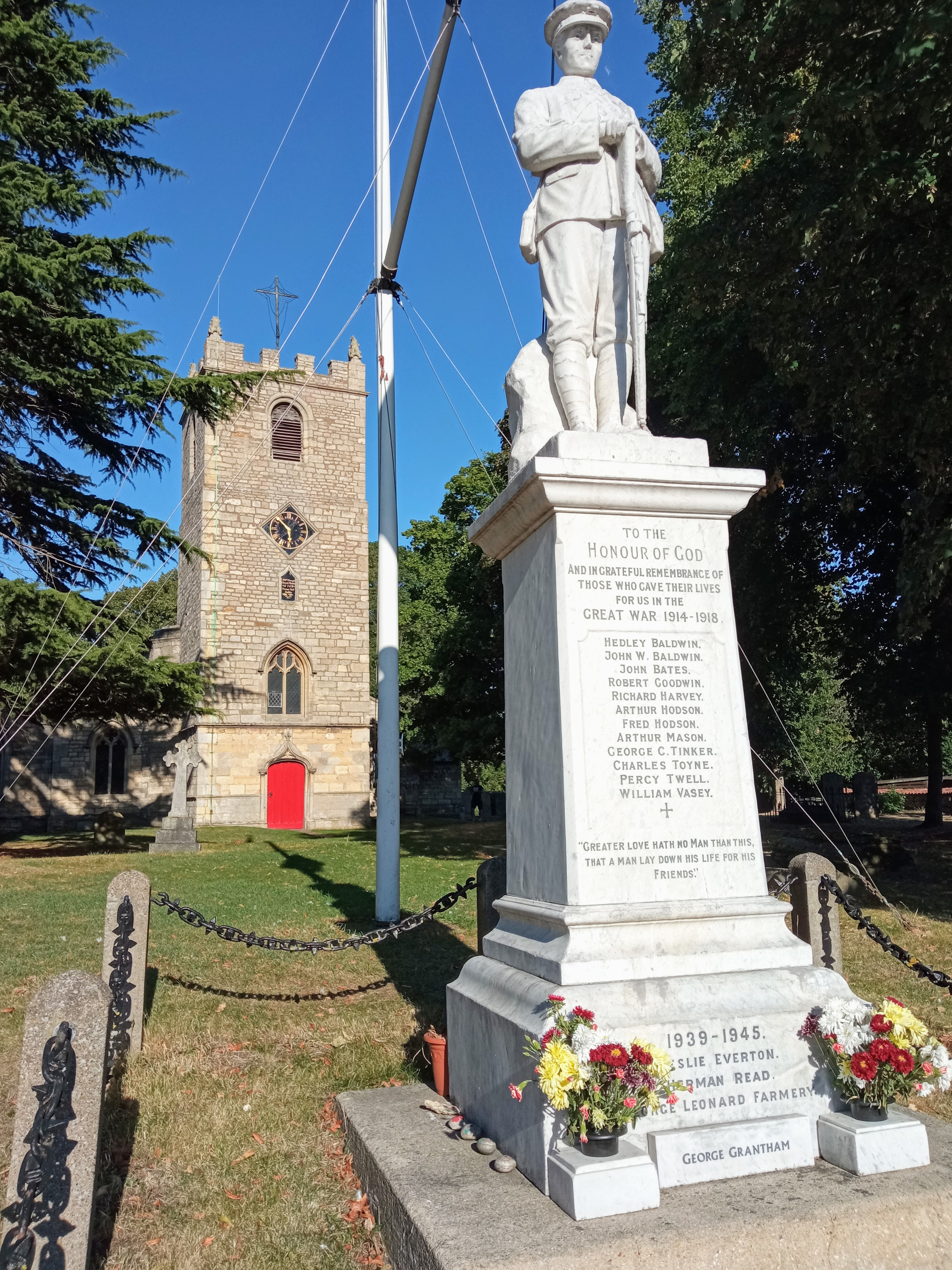
War memorial at Saint Mary's church in Welton.

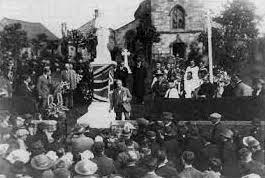
Col Herbert Gordon unveiling the war memorial on 26 May 1923.

The war memorial in St Mary's churchyard was ceremoniously erected in 1923 to commemorate the men who died fighting in World War I. It was unveiled by Col Herbert Gordon on 26 May 1923 to a crowd of Weltoners, with prayers by the Rev T Naylor, followed by the dedication by the Venerable Archdeacon Blackie, and singing. The memorial was made by A J Tuttell and son of the Monumental Masons in Lincoln, and George William Beeton (1890–1966) was photographed by J Spencer Baldry of Lincoln as a model for masons to use in the making of Welton's war memorial. Memorials using the same reference have since been erected in various villages in Lincolnshire, including Haxey and Metheringham, as well as possibly Soham in Suffolk nearby his hometown, and was also notably used for the memorial that was damaged by the IRA in Enniskillen in 1987.

It is composed of Portland stone encased in Carrara marble with leaded lettering, and became Grade II listed on 21 June 1985, alongside other local monuments.

The inscriptions read:

To the Honour of God and in Grateful Remembrance of Those Who Gave Their Lives for Us in the Great War 1914–1918

...

Greater Love Hath No Man Than This, That a Man Lay Down His Life for His Friends

1939–1945

A number of names are not shown on the memorial and can only be seen on the smaller brass plaque within St Mary's Church, such as those who were wounded or taken prisoner. The plaque was placed there to commemorate all from the parish who fought in the wars by Alfred Hunt, former vicar of Welton. The names only seen on the plaque originally included the three men who died during World War II, although they were later added to the base of the pedestal.

The name of George Grantham, who was killed in August 1918, shortly before the memorial was built, was added onto the physical memorial in around 2005, though to a separate piece of stone at the base of the pedestal, between the encompassing flowers. Harry Cottingham's name is shown on the smaller brass memorial, but only otherwise on the war memorial in neighbouring Dunholme. Notably, out of all the names on the memorial, there is one known error, as the name of Hermann Reed is incorrectly engraved as 'Herman Read'.

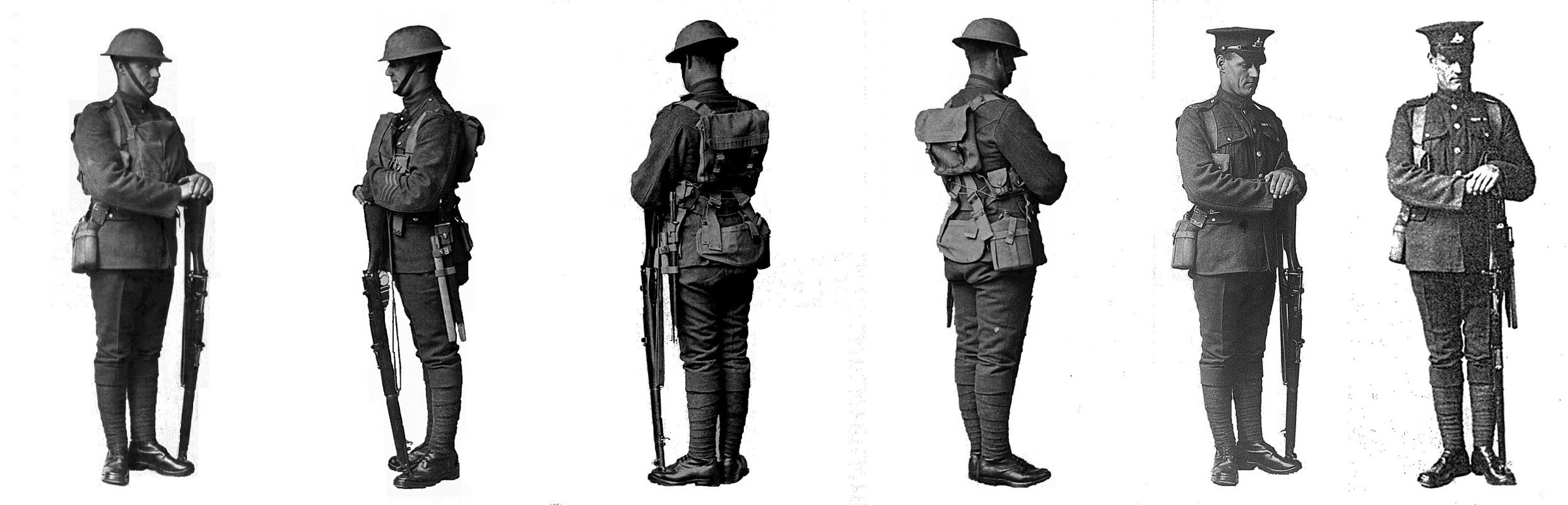
Photos from the original set of sixteen by J Spencer Baldry of George Beeton from the Lincolnshire Regiment as a model for the making of Welton's war memorial.

The first meeting to establish a committee for the organisation of a memorial was held on 28 February 1919, followed by a second meeting on 11 March. There was a large attendance of parishioners and James Lillie was appointed chairman of the meeting. It was initially decided to have a memorial hall, but the committee did not proceed with the idea. On 24 August 1922, authorisation was granted for the erection of the present memorial – a soldier of the Lincolnshire Regiment, in full battle dress, with reversed arms. The faculty also granted post permission for the RAF memorial window inside St Mary's Church, Welton. In order to be more easily accessible, a portion of the wall around the churchyard was removed and replaced by iron gates leading up to a series of stone steps. It was said in 1923 that the memorial had cost about £200, of which £65 was still outstanding by the start of June. The scheme was carried into effect by the committee, then with Mr W Lyon as their secretary.

The former flag mast from RAF Scampton was erected beside the war memorial in 1997.

Due to a lack of any known surviving documentation referencing the party responsible for the maintenance of the war memorial, the parish council (as it is empowered to do by the War Memorials (Local Authorities' Powers) Act 1923 – s 1 & 3), formally accepted responsibility for it at a meeting on 19 May 1997. The memorial is now insured for public liability by the parish council.

As part of the 2020s Bishop's Green development to the north of the village, many new streets used names from the memorial, such as Hodson, Twell, or Reed, using the corrected spelling.

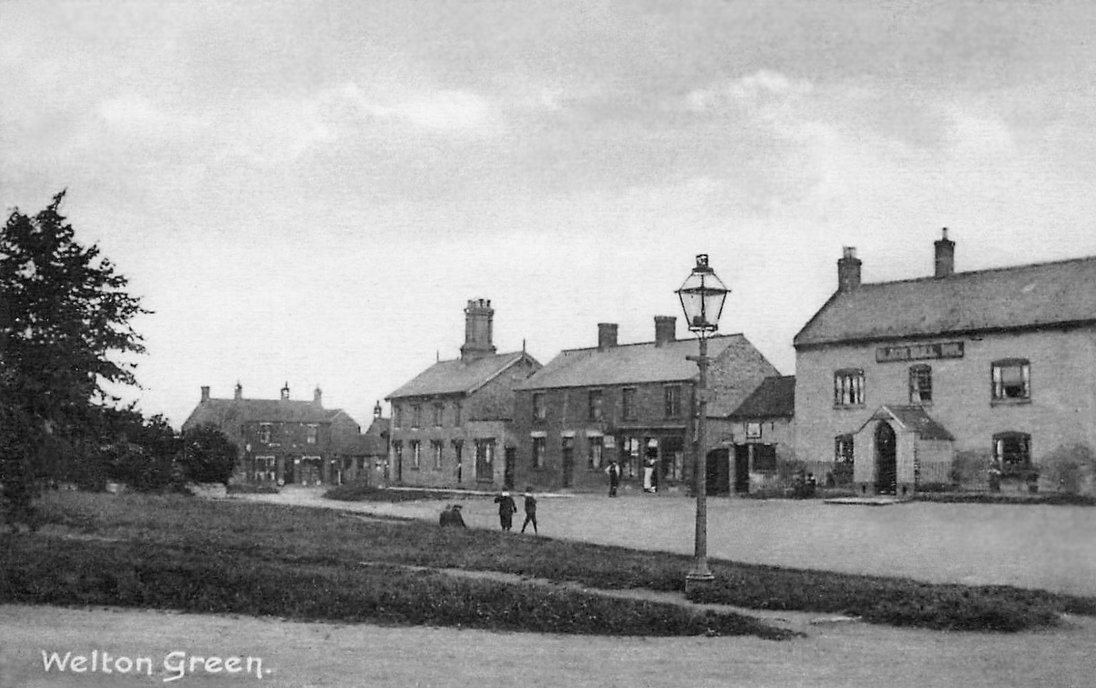
The northern green showing Victoria's jubilee lamppost and Black Bull in the background

=== Northern green ===
The main green is a grassy triangular park in the village centre. It is generally known as just 'the green', but can be called the northern green to differentiate from the similar space surrounding the pump. The green is home to a mature lime tree, which was planted at the same time as an ornate cast-iron lamppost was erected in 1897 to commemorate Queen Victoria's Diamond Jubilee. A second lamp was placed on the northern side of the green to commemorate Queen Elizabeth II's Diamond Jubilee in 2012. There is also a map board and a trio of semi-mature deciduous trees, and a recently added bench encircling the Victorian tree.

Controversially, the space is also home to "less than appropriate streetscape features," such as the bus shelter and modern street lamp.

=== Pump ===
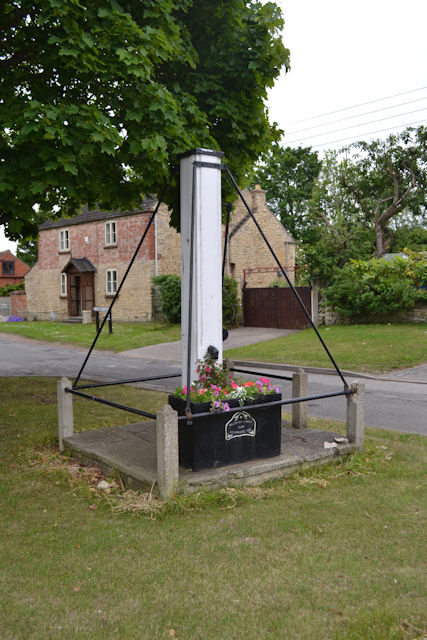
Village pump on the southern green

Though there are many old pumps throughout the village, the most famous, and likely oldest pump is located on a small grassy triangle between Sudbeck Lane and Lincoln Road, often known as the second or southern green. It is believed to have been in use as a well since the Anglo-Saxons inhabited the area, only more recently with the addition of a Victorian pump.

A common mistake regarding the name of the village is that the pump, or earlier well, is responsible for the 'wel' prefix. However, since it comes from the Anglo-Saxon 'wella,' meaning 'springing or bubbling waters or stream' a more likely origin would instead be the beck itself or the source at Old Man's Head spring just west of the village. It is likely because of this misunderstanding that the pump has become a primary symbol of the village, featuring on much Welton imagery, emblems, and even the village sign.

An ornate plaque on the side of the trough in front of the pump reads "Welton-by-Lincoln Pump Refurbished 1995" with a second on its front thanking the family of Janet Spence for their support of the pump's refurbishment.

=== Welton & Dunholme Methodist Church ===
The chapel opened in 1815 and a Sunday school room was in 1898. An extension was added to the south of the original building in the 2010s. The chapel holds a Sunday worship, and their programme claims to include children's and youth clubs, men's and women's fellowships, Bible Study, a Prayer Group and many other social, community and church activities. It is now the only remaining chapel in use in Welton, with the other two from other denominations in Ryland and Welton Hill now both closed.

== Geography ==
The town covers about 3.5 km^{2} (850 acres), almost entirely within Welton parish, save for a few residential streets and William Farr School, straddling Dunholme parish in the south. The village centre has been appreciated for its English qualities, with a multitude of Grade II or higher listed buildings, an abundance of green space, and the Welton Beck. The green spaces have also allowed the village to have a reputation as a wildlife haven. In November 1969, most of the village was made a designated conservation area.

Welton is noted for the rare chalk formation known as the Welton Band. Ironically, the layer is not visible from Welton, but on just seven sites much further north-east.

Kelly's Directory of Lincolnshire described the physical geography of the parish in 1898, saying the soil was loamy; subsoil, oolite in the upper, clay in the lower part of the parish. The chief crops were wheat, barley and oats. The area was also described as having an abundance of good building-stone in 1848.

To the immediate south-east is the neighbouring village of Dunholme, near the A46. Former air base RAF Dunholme Lodge is situated next to both villages and was a wartime bomber base used intermittently from 1941 to 1964. It was land bought from this RAF base that William Farr School was built on. Some runway still remains, though the majority of the land is now used for farming.

Beside the church, there are a handful of boulders, some of which lie against the wall. They were carried to the village during the ice age.

Though it is now governed by the West Lindsey District Council, the parish was in the ancient Lawress Wapentake. The parish was also in the north-east sub-district of the Lincoln Registration District. The village was also formerly the centre of the Welton Rural District, a region of the Parts of Lindsey, from is establishment in the Local Government Act 1894, until it was abolished under the Local Government Act 1972, then and to this day becoming part of the West Lindsey district of Lincolnshire.

As a result of the 1834 Poor Law Amendment Act, the parish became part of the Lincoln Poor Law Union. In 1881, the parish still held the right to send one poor man to Market Rasen Hospital.

=== Welton Beck ===
Welton Beck is a small stream which originates from Old Man's Head Spring in the west of Welton parish and flows eastwards through Welton and Dunholme for approximately 6 km to a confluence with the Barlings Eau near Reasby, which goes on to join the River Witham. The beck is groundwater fed, from springs of the Lincolnshire limestone aquifer. It has clear water and aquatic plant growth characteristic of calcareous conditions. Throughout the course of the beck, the channel has been significantly modified from its natural state, having been straightened, widened, and its course altered.

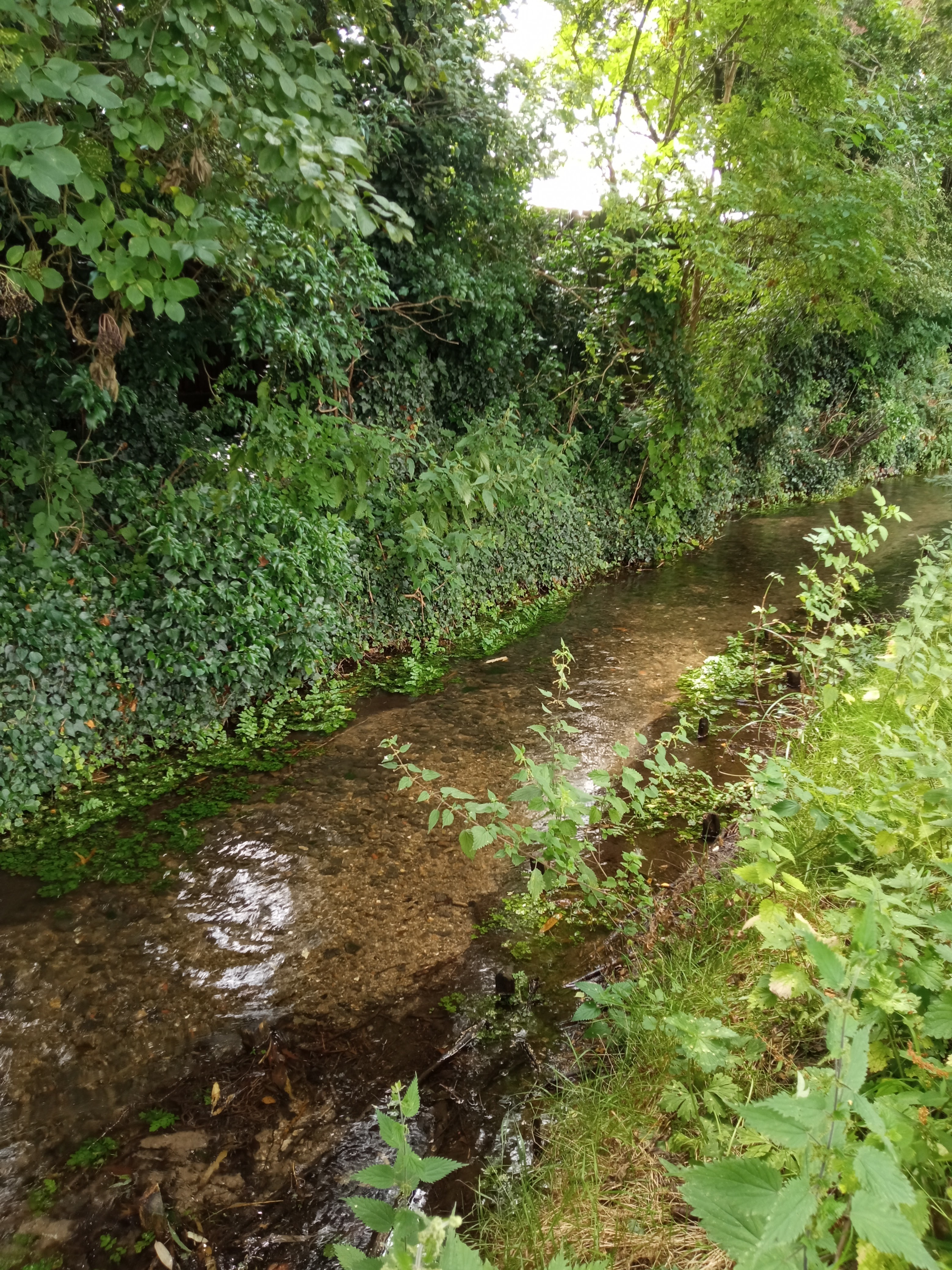
Beck in Welton

==== Well dressing ceremonies ====
The beck has long been the site of traditional well dressing ceremonies. This was a tradition that involved decorating a local spring to act as a "thanksgiving to Almighty God for the blessing of a bountiful supply of pure water to Welton". The last known ceremony on a Lincolnshire beck was in 1924.

The custom was an annual event which took place on Ascension Day. Five wells in the village were dressed, including one in the churchyard, one in the grounds of the vicarage, two in West Carr, and one in spring cottage on Sudbeck Lane. The dressing of the wells took a different format to that of neighbouring counties, Derbyshire and Nottinghamshire; in Welton, each area surrounding the well was marked with an arch formed from a tree branch and decorated with lilac and laburnum. White calico cloth on which a text taken from the bible was depicted was put into each arch by the men in the village early on Ascension Day morning. The ceremony began with a service in Saint Mary's Church, followed by a parade to the decorated beck in the churchyard. Each well was then dressed in turn and a prayer said and a hymn sung. The local Sunday school children took part in the ceremony by placing wild flowers at each well.

There is believed to have been an ancient belief of healing powers of the beck water. For example, during a whooping cough epidemic in the village in the early 1900s, mothers took their prams containing the infants and stood them in the beck, believing that the germs would be carried away with the flow of the fresh water.

== Government ==
=== Welton civil parish ===
Welton civil parish within Lincolnshire

Welton civil parish boundaries

The civil parish of Welton covers about 16 km^{2} (3,900 acres), hemmed in by Hackthorn parish to the north, and Dunholme parish to the south, also including a few scattered hamlets, most notably the former hamlet of Ryland in its east.

The parish stretches from the ancient Ermine Street (A15) in the west, following a north-easterly shape to the Barlings Eau at its eastern end, of which the Welton Beck is a tributary, and is an example of a strip parish. Due to the low, flat topography of Lincolnshire, land had to be drained for agriculture to be successful. The larger drainage channels, many of which are parallel to each other, became boundaries between parishes, causing the long and thin shape of the parish. Welton's northern and southern extents are less obviously defined. The south follows Horncaslte Lane from the A15, before cutting through the town of Welton and William Farr School until it meets up with a small stream which is followed most of the way to the Barlings Eau. The northern boundary starts in the west at RAF Scampton's 1950s runway extension and follows a vague path through fields until once again reaching the Barlings Eau river near Snarford.

Other than the main village of Welton, the civil parish includes several small hamlets, most notably Welton Hill and Welton Cliff, as well as the formerly separate Ryland. There is also evidence for other inhabited places by the names of Welton Heath, Welton Mill, and East Field.

==== Ryland ====
The former hamlet of Ryland in the east of Welton

Ryland was a small hamlet to the east of Welton that was seemingly unofficially incorporated in the late 1900s as the village grew. It was also the site of Welton's Primitive Methodist Chapel, which was built in 1859 (Note: Other sources claim an earlier date of 1839.) and closed 100 years later in 1959. It was built out of gault brick with a slate roof, segmental headed windows, and a pointed arch doorway, probably as a replacement for a general meeting place that had been used since 1851. It is currently used as a garage, and has had a garage door inserted into one of the gable ends.

The hamlet is also home to a variety of archaeological sites, including numerous Roman artefacts and buildings, as well as Anglo-Saxon, Bronze Age, and Neolithic sites and artefacts, all found in Ryland too.

The name Ryland is said to originate from the Old English 'ryge' and 'land', basically meaning a 'strip of land where rye was grown'. Like Welton, and most other places in England, the hamlet was known by other names and spelling variations in the past, such as 'de Riland' from at least 1160 to 1245. (Note: Ryland has also been known as 'Rieland, Riland Hill, Riland Sike, Rylande, Ryland Hedge')

The hamlet was recorded as having 97 inhabitants around 1858.

==== Welton Hill ====
In the furthest east of the parish of Welton 3 km (2 mi) north-east of the main village is a small hamlet with less than twenty buildings, with attractions including the former Free Methodist chapel. The former Free Methodist chapel which was built alongsidethe A46 in 1866. It is a small attractive building in red and pale yellow brick with dog-tooth decoration on the front elevation.

The hamlet has also been known as 'Long Welton Hill', 'Short Welton Hill', 'Weletonhul', (Note: or 'Welletunhil') and 'Snarford Hill', (Note: or 'Snartefordhil') likely as it is physically located very close to the hamlet of Snarford.

==== Welton Cliff ====
Located in the far west just by the border of the Scampton civil parish, the area is barely even a hamlet, with the only notable landmark being Cliffe Farm.

=== Electoral divisions ===
==== Lincolnshire County Council ====
Map of Welton Rural electoral division as of 2017

The electoral divisions that contained or were named for Welton varied greatly since their inception. From 1 April 1974 to 7 May 1981, Welton's first electoral divisions were Welton No. 1, Welton No. 2, and Welton No. 3, all with one councillor each and their first election being on 12 April 1973, and last in 1977.

From 7 May 1981 to 7 June 2001, Welton's electoral divisions largely joined with Waddingham and Spital's to the north along Lincoln Cliff to form the new division of Caenby with just one councillor. Caenby was used in the elections of 1981, 1985, 1989, 1993, and 1997.

However, from 7 June 2001 to the present, a new border and name was once again assigned to Welton's electoral division, this time name Welton Rural (not to be confused with Welton Rural District), which once again had just one councillor, and participated in the elections of 2001, 2005, 2009, 2013, 2017, and 2021. The division had some minor border adjustments in 2009, from changes to the constituent parishes borders, and a larger one on 13 December 2016, when the entire parishes of Lissington and Buslingthorpe reorganisation of Market Rasen Wold after the erasure of the Ancholme Cliff division.

==== West Lindsey District Council ====
Welton ward was situated towards the centre of West Lindsey, south of the Waddingham & Spital and Middle Rasen wards. The ward is 59 km^{2} (5,915 ha), comprising the parishes of Cold Hanworth, Faldingworth, Hackthorn, Spridlington, Toft Newton, and Welton. Welton ward population was recorded as 5,016 in 2001.

The ward was in use from 1 April 1974, first election 7 June 1973, to 7 May 2015, originally having just one councillor, but upping to two on 6 May 1999.

On 7 May 2015, Welton ward merged with Dunholme ward to form the Welton and Dunholme ward, with the last population estimates being at 8,222 in 2011, based on data from the two former wards.

==== UK Parliament constituency ====
Welton has voted as part of the Gainsborough constituency since the 1885 general election. It became part of Gainsborough and Horncastle when it existed from the 1983 election until 1997, after which it returned to the Gainsborough constituency.

== Climate ==
Welton, Lincolnshire

Climate chart (precipitation, max. and min. temperature)
J	F	M	A	M	J	J	A	S	O	N	D
49 7 1	39 8 1	36 10 2	45 13 4	46 16 7	65 19 10	59 22 12	57 21 12	53 18 10	58 14 7	60 10 4	54 7 1
- █ Average max. and min. temperatures in °C
- █ Precipitation totals in mm
- Source: Met Office
Imperial conversion
J	F	M	A	M	J	J	A	S	O	N	D
1.9 44 34	1.5 46 34	1.4 50 36	1.8 56 39	1.8 61 45	2.6 66 50	2.3 71 54	2.3 71 54	2.1 65 50	2.3 57 45	2.4 50 38	2.1 45 34
- █ Average max. and min. temperatures in °F
- █ Precipitation totals in inches

As with the rest of the British Isles, Welton has a temperate oceanic climate (Köppen: Cfb) with cool summers and mild winters. The nearest official Met Office weather station for which online records are available is at RAF Scampton, less than 5 km (3 mi) to the south of the town centre.

In a typical year, the warmest day should reach a high temperature of at least 21.62 °C (70.92 °F), whereas the coldest day should always reach a low temperature of 1.02 °C (33.84 °F).

The record high at RAF Scampton peaked at 39.9 °C (103.8 °F) in the afternoon of 19 July 2022 during the 2022 United Kingdom heat wave, beating not only the previous local record of 35.1 °C (95.2 °F) from a three-day heatwave on 26 July 2019, but also the former national record of 38.7 °C (101.7 °F) also from July 2019.

The absolute minimum temperature of −15.6 °C (3.9 °F) was recorded on 7 December 2010 at RAF Scampton, during the record-breaking winter of 2010–11 in Great Britain and Ireland. A former nearby weather station holds the record for the lowest daytime maximum temperature recorded in England in the month of December at −9.0 °C (15.8 °F) on 17 December 1981. In a year, 48.98 nights should register an air frost.

The length of the day varies extremely over the course of the year in Welton. The shortest day may have 7 hours and 30 minutes of daylight, and the longest as much as 10 hours more, with 17 hours of daylight. The earliest sunrise is at around 4:30 am in June, and the latest sunrise is 4 hours later at 8:30 am in December. The earliest sunset is at 3:30 pm in December, and the latest is 6 hours later at 9:30 pm in June. Daylight saving time (DST) is observed in Welton, starting in the spring, lasting about 7 months, and ending in the autumn.

Winters are generally cool with little temperature variation. Heavy snow is rare but snow usually falls at least once each winter. Spring and autumn can be pleasant.

Climate data for RAF Scampton, elevation: 57 m (187 ft), 1991–2020 normals
Month	Jan	Feb	Mar	Apr	May	Jun	Jul	Aug	Sep	Oct	Nov	Dec	Year
Mean daily maximum °C (°F)	6.86 (44.35)	7.74 (45.93)	10.24 (50.43)	13.19 (55.74)	16.22 (61.20)	19.10 (66.38)	21.62 (70.92)	21.42 (70.56)	18.37 (65.07)	14.11 (57.40)	9.79 (49.62)	7.02 (44.64)	13.84 (56.91)
Mean daily minimum °C (°F)	1.05 (33.89)	1.02 (33.84)	2.26 (36.07)	4.11 (39.40)	6.97 (44.55)	9.95 (49.91)	12.05 (53.69)	11.96 (53.53)	9.82 (49.68)	7.04 (44.67)	3.55 (38.39)	1.12 (34.02)	5.93 (42.67)
Average rainfall mm (inches)	48.91 (1.93)	38.62 (1.52)	35.87 (1.41)	44.54 (1.75)	45.80 (1.80)	64.96 (2.56)	58.79 (2.31)	57.38 (2.26)	52.96 (2.09)	58.15 (2.29)	59.90 (2.36)	53.52 (2.11)	619.40 (24.39)
Average extreme snow depth cm (inches)	6.9 (2.7)	9.3 (3.7)	3.9 (1.5)	0.7 (0.3)	0 (0)	0 (0)	0 (0)	0 (0)	0 (0)	0 (0)	1.2 (0.5)	5.3 (2.1)	9.3 (3.7)
Average precipitation days	8.7	6.8	7.3	6.7	7.6	7.8	7.3	7.9	7.2	8.6	8.4	8.6	92.9
Average rainy days (≥ 1.0 mm)	10.63	9.49	8.79	8.97	8.90	9.61	9.58	9.38	9.44	10.41	11.86	11.04	118.10
Average snowy days	9	8	7	5	7	7	7	7	5	7	8	8	85
Average relative humidity (%)	88	85	82	80	81	83	79	76	78	83	87	89	83
Mean monthly sunshine hours	229.4	188.8	233.4	239.6	231.6	222.8	257.8	272.0	257.7	229.4	213.9	239.4	2,815.8
Mean daily daylight hours	8.2	9.9	12.0	14.1	15.9	16.9	16.4	14.7	12.6	10.5	8.6	7.6	12.3
Average ultraviolet index	2	2	2	3	4	4	4	4	4	3	2	2	3
Source 1: Met Office
Source 2: Weather Spark (daylight hours and precipitation days), World Weather Online (snow days, snow depth, UV index, humidity, and sun hours)

== Demography ==
Historical population

Year	Pop.	±%
1801	380	—
1811	368	−3.2%
1821	484	+31.5%
1831	516	+6.6%
1841	566	+9.7%
1851	604	+6.7%
1861	692	+14.6%

Year	Pop.	±%
1871	692	+0.0%
1881	682	−1.4%
1891	660	−3.2%
1901	609	−7.7%
1911	608	−0.2%
1921	637	+4.8%
1931	635	−0.3%

Year	Pop.	±%
1951	797	+25.5%
1961	939	+17.8%
1971	1,632	+73.8%
1981	2,466	+51.1%
1991	2,751	+11.6%
2001	3,821	+38.9%
2011	4,327	+13.2%

The 2011 census recorded the population of the civil parish to be 4,327.

The 2001 census recorded a resident village population of Welton civil parish alone as 3,821. The population in the Welton ward was 5,016, which includes other smaller villages and nearby parishes from Hackthorn to Faldingworth. The population of the Welton civil parish alone was 3,821.

== Amenities ==
There is a wide range of services, amenities, and retail outlets in the village, ranging from cafes, newsagents, pet shop and takeaways. There is also a campsite, Co-op store, local butchers, and a veterinary clinic.

The Black Bull is rumoured to be a former regular of the Dam Busters, and reputedly, haunted. Though no ghost has ever been seen, the haunting has often been reported because of inexplicable sounds believed to be a phantom slowly climbing the eighteen stairs to the restaurant.

The Parish Office houses a collection of historic village items and gifts received through the village's twinning on display in the lower room. The Parish Council operates a Community Award which is presented annually to a member of the parish nominated by the community for voluntary work they have carried out in Welton for the benefit of others. They also award Certificates of Achievement if there are a number of nominations, and a Group Recognition Certificate.

The first brick for the Village Hall was laid on 18 September 1961 and officially opened by Mr L. H. Brant on 21 April 1962 with a full programme of events for the week including a dance to Tony Storr and the Clubmen; part of the old hall can still be seen on the West side of the present building. The Moncé Room was added in 1975 and today the village hall is managed by a charitable trust and is used regularly by local organisations, for private parties and community events.

Marvin Liddle operates the registered charity Project Cornerstone on Ryland Road, that collects funds from foreign and old coinage donations for education in Ghana, healthcare education in Malawi and Burundi, and a crisis fund for Phuket, Thailand.

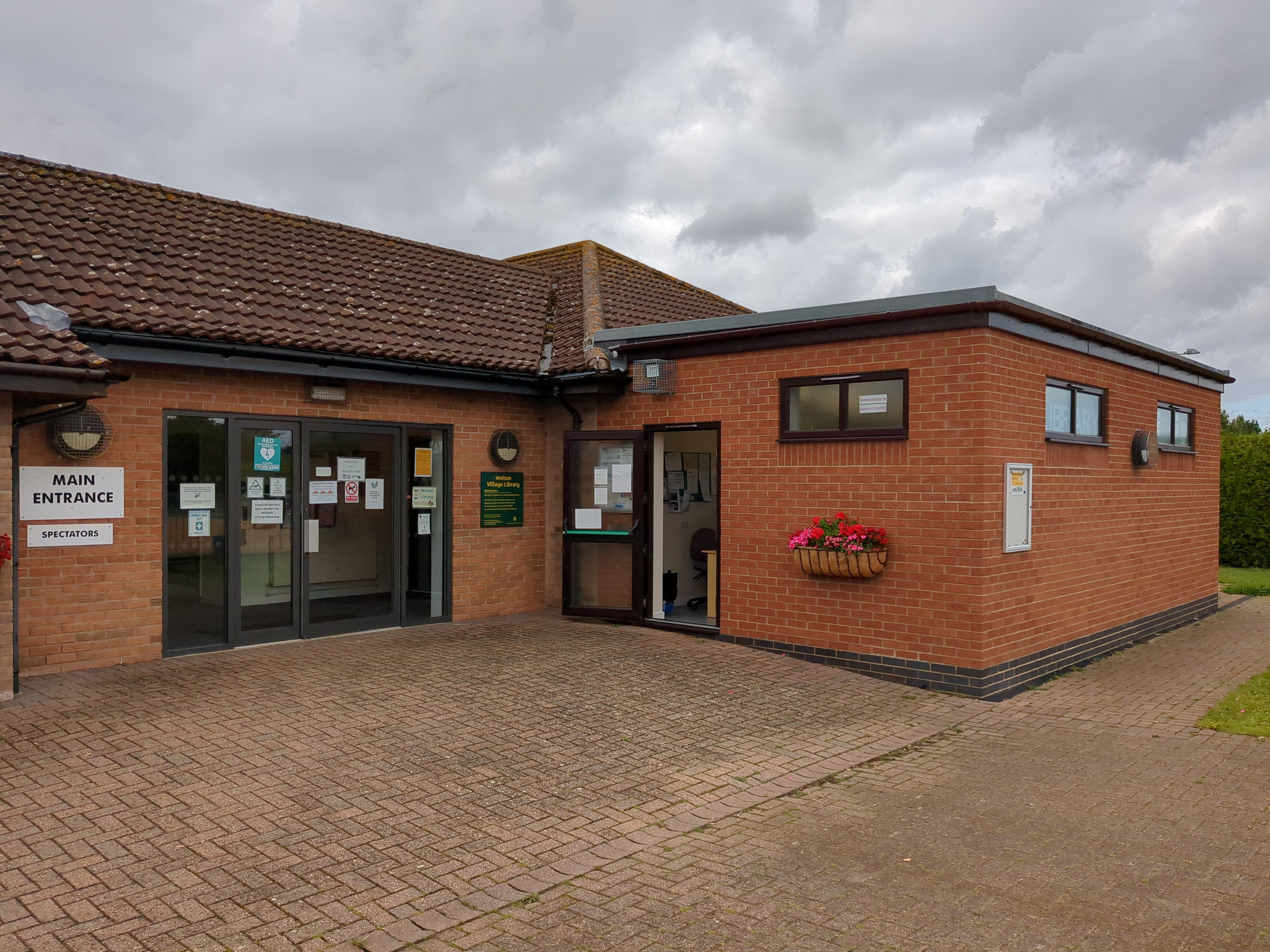
Welton Library

Manor Park pavilion is used twice-weekly for Pilates classes and a bridge club together with the football club, who regularly play at weekends. It is a popular venue for birthday parties. There is a children's play area, Skatepark, two Multi Use Games Areas, outdoor Gym and a Zip Wire. Welton Library was refurbished in February 2008, but moved from the premises of the Co-op beside the Health Centre in August 2015 due to legal complications, only reopening at the Community Hub at Manor Park in March 2016. The Library receives regular attendance from residents in Welton and the surrounding villages and has become a hub for Community talks, children's storytime and regular craft events.

The village playing field serves as the secondary recreational ground in Welton, despite its more central location. There is a children's playground and the Sports and Social Club, where members play darts and pool as well as outdoor activities such as football.

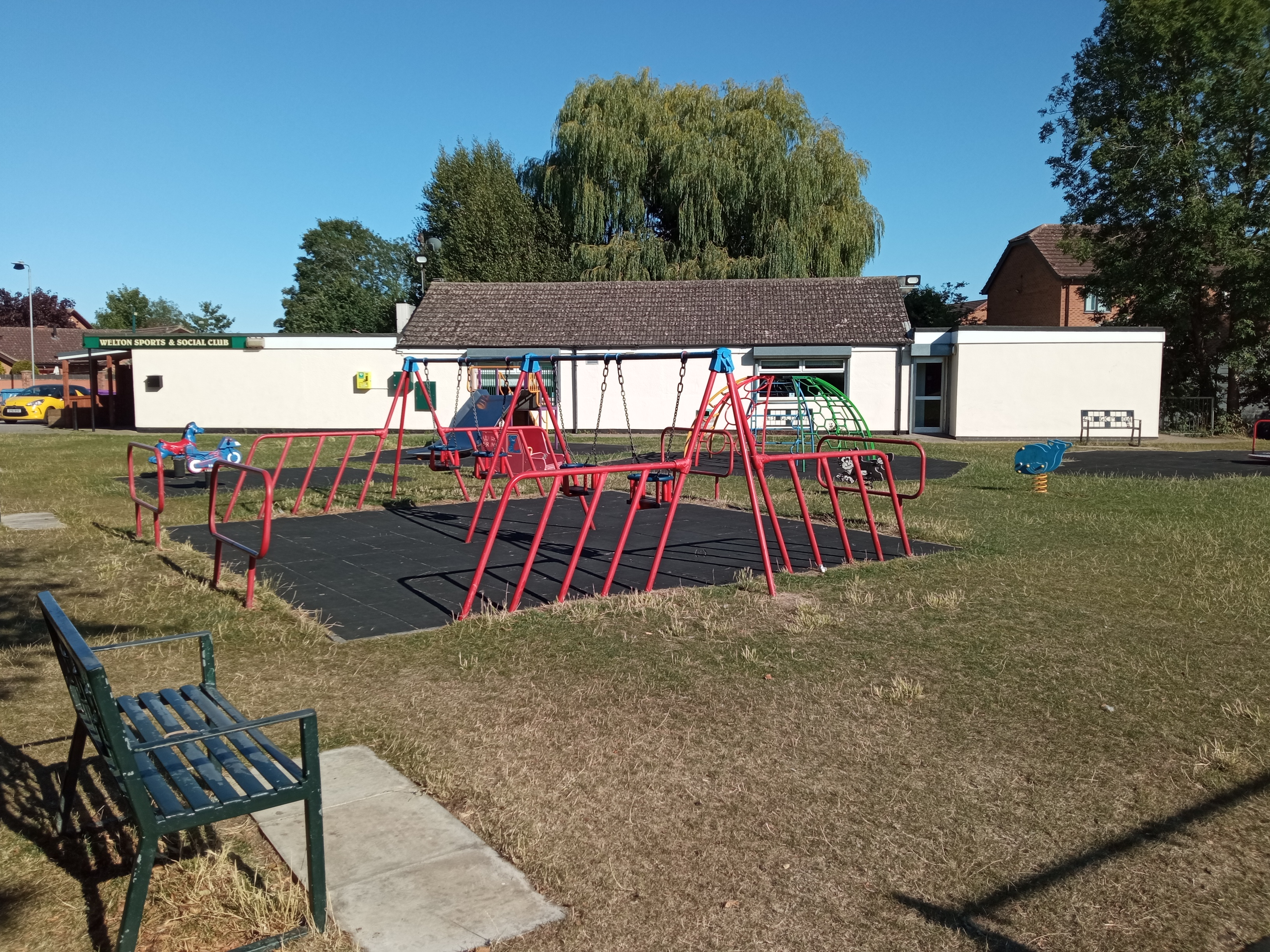
Welton Sports and Social club.

The Rednil Farm Equestrian Centre, established 1980, is a 60-acre riding centre with its own cross-country course as well as indoor and outdoor manège, a jumping arena, school and social room, offices, tack rooms and stables. It teaches riding in different disciplines and at different levels and also trains and corrects horses and ponies.

Welton has two schools, the Ofsted outstanding William Farr secondary school on Lincoln Road, and St Mary's C of E Primary Academy on School Drive. The students at the primary school designed a painted model of the Lincoln Imp that was placed at the Lincoln Hotel for the Lincoln Imp Trail 2021. In conjunction with the school, the related Friends of St Mary's school group of parents and staff also organises events frequently, such as a Scarecrow Trail around the village, and bingo. There are also three preschools.

The village has many youth football teams, including the U12 Bombers and U16 Bombers, both of which play in their respective age group of the Lincolnshire Co-op Mid Lincs County Youth Football League. In conjunction with Welton Parish Council, the clubhouse at Manor Park maintains a record of top scorers.

The Scout Hut provides activities for Brownies and Guides.

== International Relations ==
=== Twin towns – sister cities ===
Welton is twinned with:

- Moncé-en-Belin, France (since 1974)

Welton and Moncé-en-Belin signed the Official Twinning Charter on 28 September 1974 in Welton. The Parish Council's Heritage & Events Committee oversees all activity related to twinning with the council in Moncé-en-Belin, chaired by Cllr Marlene Chapman, vice-chair of Welton's council, who usually gives the welcome speech on the Moncéen arrival in Welton. The two councils meet and celebrate anniversaries every 10 years. The most recent anniversary was marked in Summer 2024 when Welton members visited France for the 50th anniversary celebrations. Visits between members of the Family Twinning Association take place each year over the August bank holiday weekend with the people from Moncé-en-Belin visiting Welton every other year, and vice versa. There is a French post box on the wall of the Parish Council office, and a street named Monce Close in Welton, as well as an Avenue de Welton in Moncé-en-Belin.
