= RAF Faldingworth =

Former Royal Air Force station in Lincolnshire, England

RAF Faldingworth
- Faldingworth, Lincolnshire in England
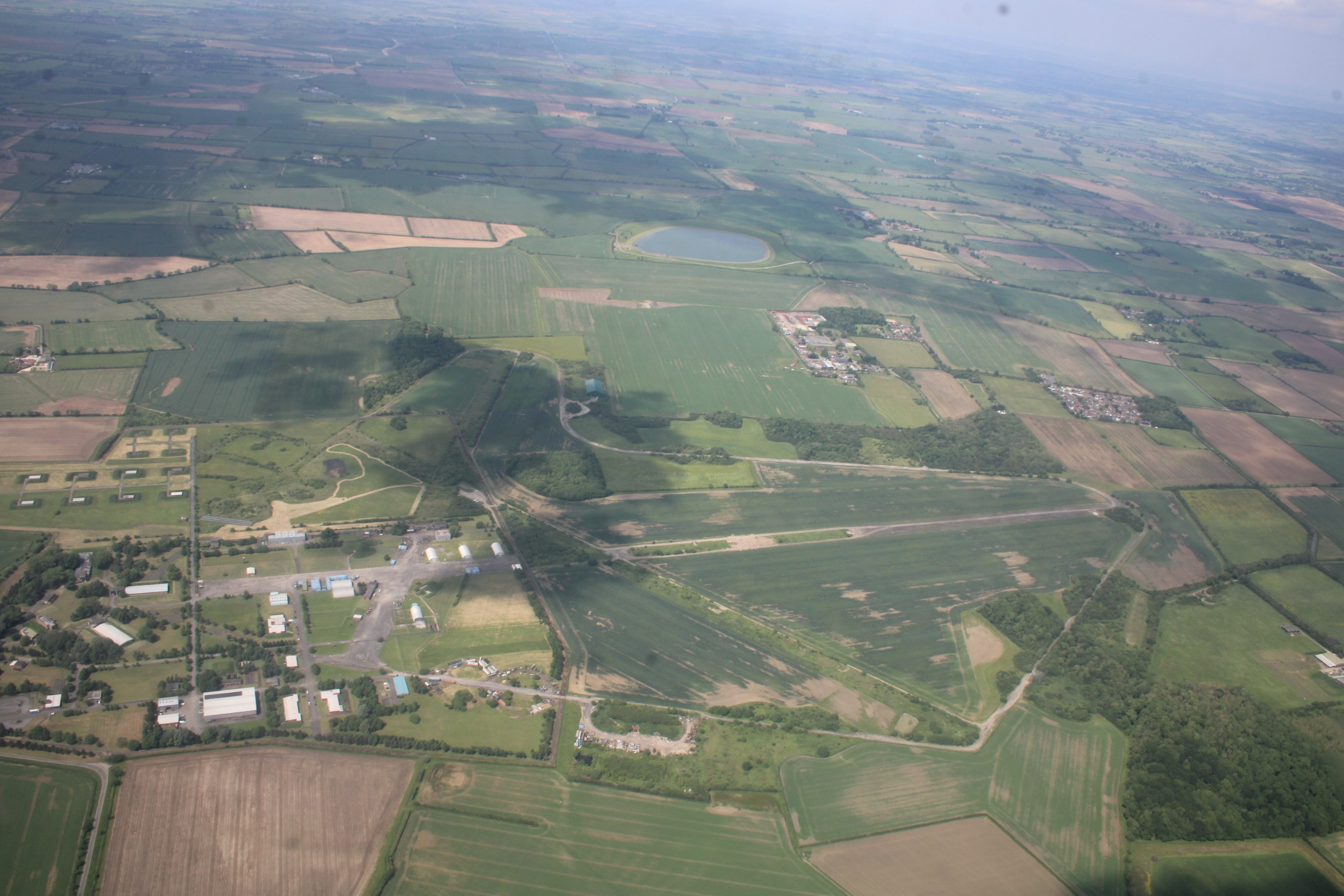
- Aerial view of RAF Faldingworth (2024)

Site information
- Type: Royal Air Force satellite station
- Owner: Ministry of Defence
- Operator: Royal Air Force
- Controlled by: RAF Bomber Command * No. 1 Group RAF

Location
- Shown within Lincolnshire RAF Faldingworth (the United Kingdom)
- Coordinates: 53°20′58″N 000°27′23″W

Site history
- Built: 1943
- In use: 1943 - 1972
- Battles/wars: European theatre of World War II

Airfield information
- Elevation: 15 metres (49 ft) AMSL
Runways
Direction	Length and surface
00/00	Asphalt
00/00	Asphalt
00/00	Asphalt

Royal Air Force Faldingworth or more simply RAF Faldingworth is a former Royal Air Force satellite station used during and after the Second World War. It was located close to the village of Faldingworth in Lincolnshire, England.

== Development ==
By 1936 the RAF Expansion Scheme had overseen a period of rapid increases both in terms of aircraft operated and the development of new stations. The Faldingworth site was one of several earmarked under the expansion programme.

As it developed, it made an increasingly dramatic imposition on the surrounding rural landscape such as to the Lincolnshire Edge, a Jurassic limestone ridge, which forms the distinctive backbone of the county from Whitton on the Humber Estuary in the north, down to Grantham in the south.

It provides a continuous homogenous landscape of high quality agricultural land, with a number of local variations. To the west of the Edge, the gently undulating Trent Vale eventually flows into the moors and levels of Humberhead, draining to the Humber Estuary.

To the east there is a gentle transition into the Central Lincolnshire Vale between the Humber and Lincoln, while south of Lincoln the Edge is bounded by a narrow finger of Fenland, which follows the River Witham into Lincoln. To the south, the Edge merges into the more undulating Kesteven Uplands.

Along the top of the Edge a series of airfields were developed. They lie within an open landscape, consisting of rectilinear fields and few boundaries.

== History ==
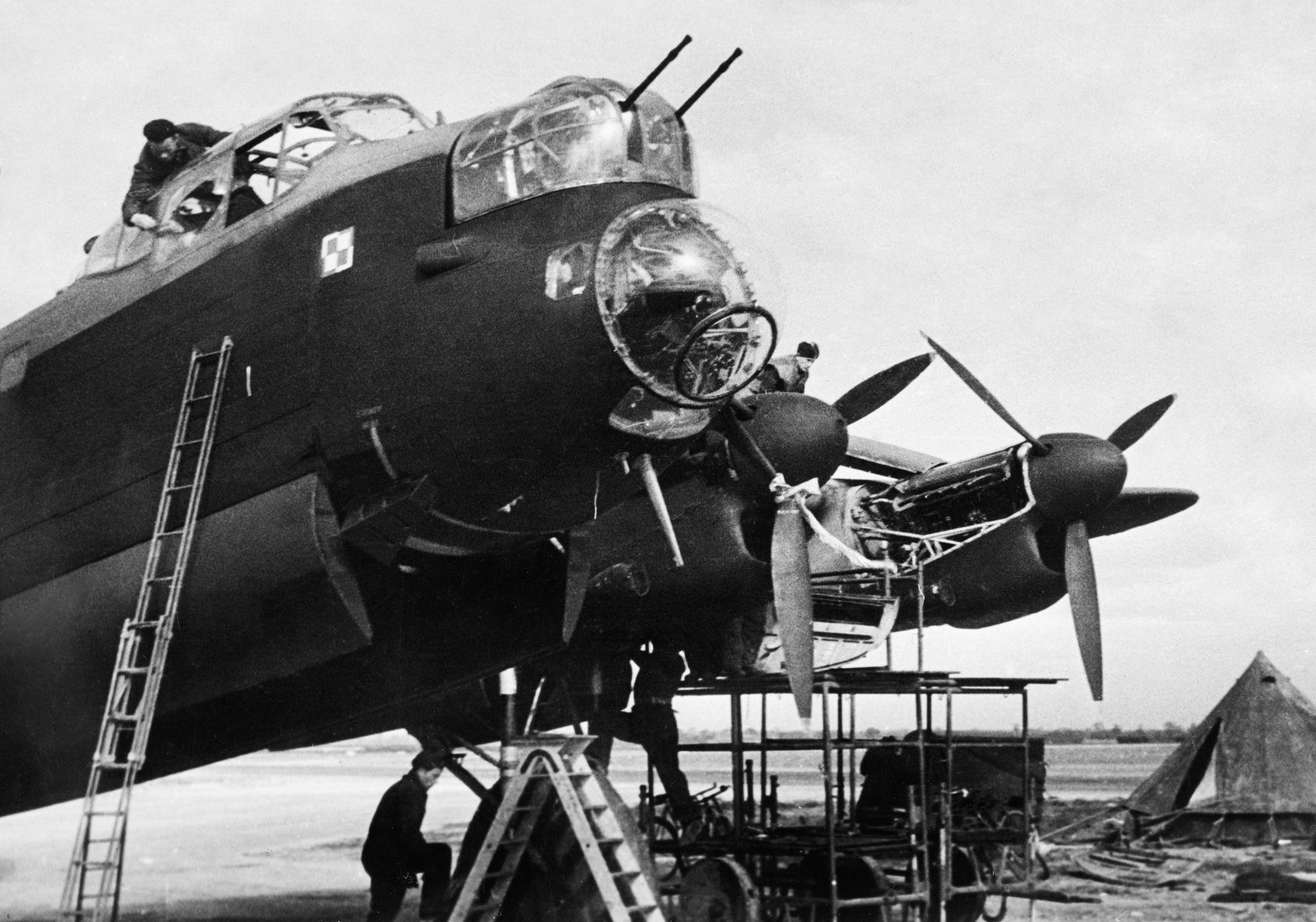
Ground crew servicing an Avro Lancaster of No. 300 Polish Bomber Squadron at Faldingworth. 25 April 1944

Faldingworth entered service life as Toft Grange decoy airfield and later as a satellite airfield of RAF Lindholme. Late in 1943 it became a satellite of RAF Ludford Magna. After the war the base was used for storage of weapons.

In 1957 the site became a nuclear weapons store for the RAF's V bomber force. In times of crisis nuclear weapons from the site would be distributed to the nearby V-bomber airfields such as RAF Scampton, RAF Finningley and RAF Coningsby. With the transfer of the UK nuclear deterrent role to the Royal Navy's Resolution-class submarines in 1968 the site was run down and finally deactivated in 1972.

In 1959 there was an oxygen production unit operating on the opposite side of the airfield to the nuclear weapons storage site. Two BA1D air separation units were operated on a 24-hour basis to provide a ready supply of breathable oxygen for the aircrew of the V-bombers. At that time RAF Faldingworth was a satellite station of RAF Scampton.

Current Ordnance Survey maps show the remains of a typical wartime bomber airfield, with the former storage site overlaying the southwestern part of the airfield, about 1.25 miles (2 km) east of Spridlington.

There is a cluster of 127 RAF-built houses northeast of the airfield area, sold to Roger Byron-Collins' Welbeck Estate Group in 1979 and renamed The Virginia Estate, later Newtoft. A group of RAF buildings is used as an industrial estate, Newtoft Business Park.

== Operation units and aircraft ==
The following units were here at some point:

- No. 300 Polish Bomber Squadron (1944-1947) - Vickers Wellington X, Avro Lancaster I & III
- No. 305 Polish Bomber Squadron (1946-1947) - de Havilland Mosquito VI
- No. 1546 (Beam Approach Training) Flight RAF
- No. 1667 Heavy Conversion Unit RAF
- No. 1 Lancaster Finishing School RAF
- No. 92 Maintenance Unit RAF (No. 92 MU)
- Sub site of No. 93 MU
- No. 2797 Squadron RAF Regiment

== Memorial ==
A memorial is now in place at the end of the main runway commemorating 300 (Polish) Squadron.
