= Welton Beck =

River in Lincolnshire, England

Location
- Sovereign state: United Kingdom
- Country: England
- Counties: Lincolnshire
- District: West Lindsey
- Civil parish: Welton, Dunholme

Physical characteristics
- Source
  - location: Old Man's Head
  - coordinates: 53.3026°N 0.5056°W
- Mouth
  - location: Barlings Eau
  - coordinates: 53.3008°N 0.4231°W
- Length: 10 km (6.2 mi)
- Progression: Welton Beck—Barlings—Witham—The Haven—North Sea

Welton Beck is a small local stream which originates from Old Man's Head Spring in the west of Welton civil parish and flows eastwards through Welton and Dunholme in the West Lindsey district of Lincolnshire for approximately 10 km (6.2 mi) to a confluence with Barlings Eau near Reasby, which goes on to join the River Witham. The beck is fed from groundwater springs of the Lincolnshire limestone aquifer, with clear freshwater and aquatic plant growth typical of calcareous conditions. The channel of the beck has been largely modified from its original state, having been widened, straightened, and its course significantly altered.

The beck is often incorrectly referred to as the "Dunholme Beck", however, it is officially only called Welton Beck for its entire length.

== History ==
There is thought to have been an ancient belief in the healing powers of the water of the beck. Water was transported from Welton to Lincoln during the 1905 typhoid epidemic, after the River Witham was decided to be too contaminated. During an epidemic of whooping cough just after the year 1900 in the village, mothers took their children in prams and set them in the stream, believing the germs would be washed away by the flow of the healing freshwater.

=== Well dressing ceremonies ===
The beck has long been the site of traditional well dressing ceremonies, which involved decorating the local spring to act as a "thanksgiving to Almighty God for the blessing of a bountiful supply of pure water to Welton". The last known ceremony on a beck in Lincolnshire was in 1924.

The custom took place annually on Ascension Day, where five wells were dressed in the village, starting with one in the churchyard, then one on the property of the vicarage, two at West Carr, and one at Spring Cottage on Sudbeck Lane. Welton's well dressing was in a notably different style to those of adjacent counties, Nottinghamshire and Derbyshire; in Welton, the area surrounding each well was given an arch made from a branch and decorated with laburnum and lilac. White calico cloth decorated with a passage from the bible was placed on each arch by the men of the village in the early morning on Ascension Day. The ceremony started with a service at St Mary's Church, then a parade to a decorated portion of the beck at the east end of the churchyard. Each well around the village was then dressed, each with a prayer said and a hymn sung, all joined by the children of the local Sunday school who took part by laying wild flowers by each well.

== Route ==
=== Old Man's Head ===
The spring at the source of the river is called Old Man's Head, and emerges around a large concrete culvert, appearing to bubble up around through the stones to the side of the channel. The stream quickly forms a relatively large pool, before flowing downwards towards the town.

=== Through Welton ===
About 1.5 km (0.93 mi) downstream from the river's source at Old Man's Head, the pond near Norbeck Farm, located directly south of the beck, upstream from Welton town, first appears on the 1966 1:2500 Ordnance Survey map, inferring an approximate date of construction to be between 1956 and 1966. It is situated over two springs, both marked on the earlier 1956 1:10560 OS map. LiDAR maps of the vicinity show some lower-lying areas that indicate the former course of the beck was more meandering, since fixed to a straighter path bordering the agricultural land. This is a potential area for a renaturalisation project such as re-meandering its course or reconnecting the northern floodplains, providing benefits both for local wildlife, as well as potential flood protection in extreme incidences, by slowing the water's conveyance through the village and providing the area with floodwater storage.

From the bridge on Vicarage Lane, past the St Mary's Church to the playing field in the town, the beck is straight and steeper, bordered by private residences, with a poor aquatic habitat, being uniformly shallow and completely devoid of deeper pools. Habitat around this area could be improved by the construction of pools using low weirs. At the playing field, the beck widens and remains shallow, with equally poor aquatic habitat. The right bank is lined by residential gardens or fences, while the left has been partially reinforced with paving slabs, leading into an earthen bank further downstream. The channel here would benefit from narrowing, removing the slabs and re-profiling the left bank at a shallower angle, creating a two-stage channel and retaining capacity for flood flows whilst improving habitat for the newly narrower channel for summer flow.

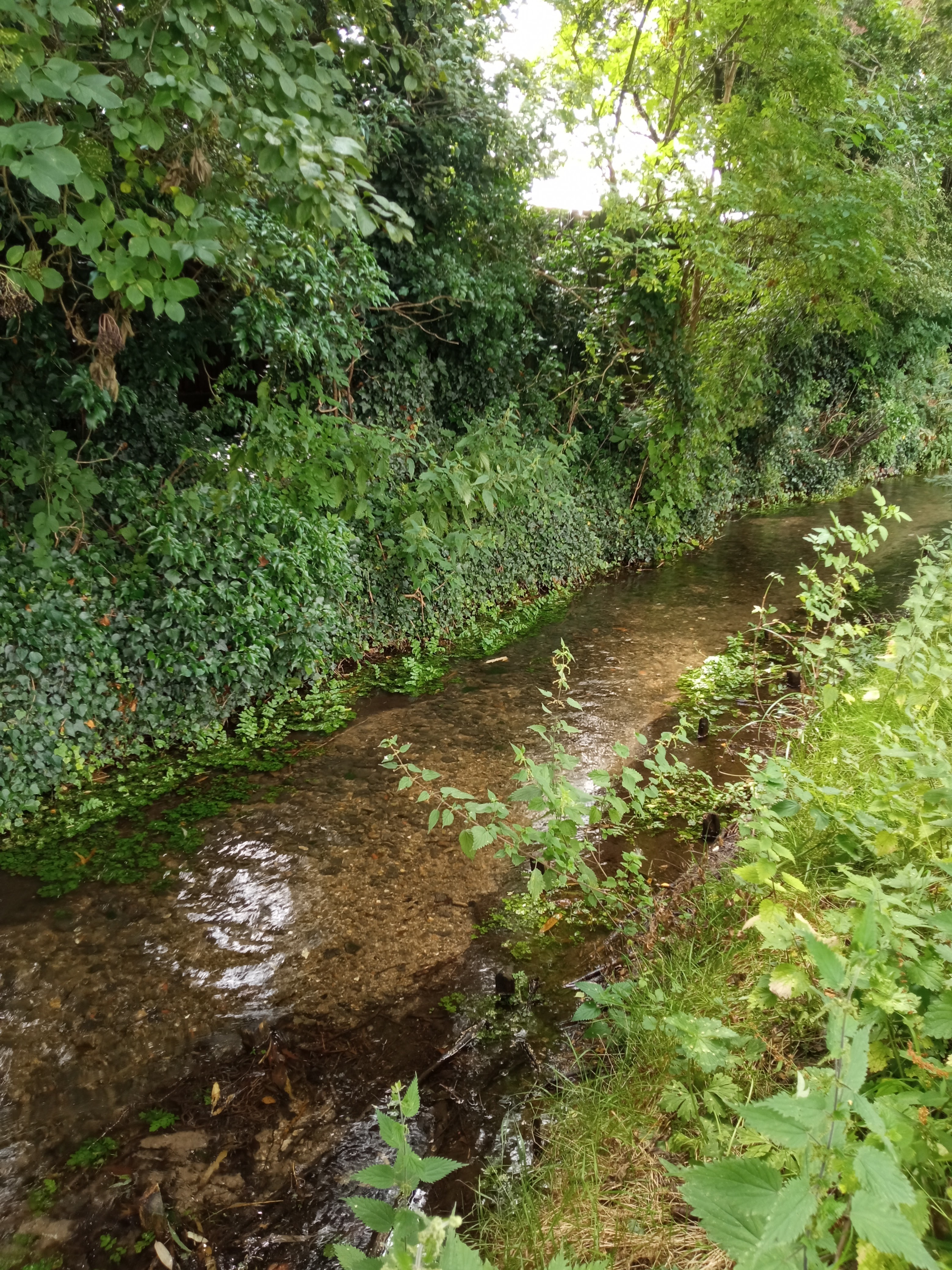
Beck in Welton

Downstream from the playing field the beck is confined between gardens oncemore, pefore passing under a road culvert under The Grove. The flow conveyance capacity is small, as with other bridges across the beck, though this does allow a deeper scour pool to be created downstream by the natural funnelling effect of the water through the culvert. About 500 m of the beck from The Grove to Ryland Bridge is inaccessible to the public, flowing through private residences. The bridge has especially limited conveyance capacity due to the culvert underneath.

The beck is generally confined by the straight walls of gardens past Ryland Bridge, before reaching the naturally more meandering section as it enters into a wooded area, straddling Welton and Dunholme parishes alongside a pond off the left bank, which is used by the Scunthorpe Pisces Angling Club. The aquatic habitat in the beck improves through this short and more meandering section, containing deeper scour pools on the exterior of bends neighbouring mature trees.

=== Through Dunholme ===
Further downstream, the channel has evidently been deepened and widened, until returning to a very shallow state with poor aquatic habitat, with a lower gradient. Along some parts of this section of the beck, the depositing of sediment on the inside of bends has begun to restore its natural, serpentine dimensions, as vegetated berms form. The channel's maintenance has retained these berms, trimming only taller vegetation like rushes. In the more shaded areas, berms have not developed, likely due to the lack of sunlight preventing the growth of aquatic vegetation.

From the ford at Watery Lane, downstream through Dunholme and past St Chad's Church, the beck has almost exclusively walled banks constructed to be uniformly shallow and wide to provide greater conveyance in the rare event of higher flows, protecting nearby properties from flooding. Downstream of the ford at Beck Lane, there is a short section of steeper channel, with a much coarser riverbed substrate than elsewhere, then an approximately 200 m section to the A46 with a lower gradient, that has been artificially widened and deepened. The brook here is uniformly very shallow, as with further upstream. The aquatic habitat is very poor for much of this section, though some natural berms have been aided in developing thanks to the cutting of taller vegetation, similar to previous areas.

The brook then runs through another concrete culvert under the A46, with a large lip on the upstream side which causes the pooling of very shallow water, which becomes an impediment to fish when the water level is sufficiently low. The beck then briefly passes through agricultural land, going on to join the Barlings Eau around 2 km (1.2 mi) further downstream. This part of the channel is maintained for its land drainage function, causing generally poor aquatic habitat brought on by straightening. Monks Wood lines the south bank for much of this section. The Barlings Eau has a larger fish population, including wild trout, so it is considered important to ensure a free pathway for migration upstream. The route is generally free of obstructions, except occasionally for a culvert under a farm track.

== Water and habitat quality ==
As a tributary, the Welton Beck forms a part of the 115 km^{2} (11,500 ha) Barlings Eau water body, according to the Water Framework Directive, which set the target of achieving a good potential or good status to all water bodies in the UK by the year 2027, based solely on habitat and water quality. The larger water body has a moderate ecological status, but like many other rivers in the UK, its chemical status dropped from good to fail in 2019, after the presence of polybrominated diphenyl ethers (PBDE) and mercury compounds became included in the assessment. However, the classifications for the larger water body may not reflect the more localised conditions of Welton Beck.

Aquatic habitat quality in the beck is overall largely poor, brought on by uniform depth, substrate composition, and channel shape, limiting its value for the ecosystem. This is demonstrated by the most recent fishery survey, from October 2016, producing only sticklebacks, stone loach, and minnows. Should habitat conditions improve within the Welton Beck, it could support a hreater diversity of fish species, like the trout that could colonise from the Barlings Eau, having the knock-on effect of increasing the chances that the beck can support more wildlife including kingfishers, otters, water voles, and herons. River re-naturalisation projects upstream of Welton, around Norbeck Farm, could also improve biodiversity, as well as introduce new amenities and help reduce flood risk. On the sections of the beck within the town of Welton with a steeper gradient, the creation of scour pools is needed improve fish habitat.

The beck's gradient is steeper within Welton, lessening by Dunholme and especially so once east of the A46. Along the entire course of the river, there are no significant obsctructions to fish passage, except for one culvert under a track crossing near the confluence with the Barlings Eau, which would require minor modification.

Lincolnshire Rivers Trust, the Wild Trout Trust, and the Environment Agency have worked together to develop a project shaped by Lincolnshire's unique and geographically isolated limestone becks, which support a rich aquatic fauna and flora rarely found in eastern England, with which Welton is included.
