= William Farr School =

Location
- Lincoln Road, Welton; Lincoln, Lincolnshire, LN2 3JB; England; 53°18′04″N 0°28′55″W

Information
- Type: Academy
- Religious affiliation: Church of England
- Established: 1952
- Founder: William Farr
- Department for Education URN: 136415 Tables
- Ofsted: Reports
- Head teacher: Grant Edgar
- Staff: 217
- Gender: Coeducational
- Age: 11 to 18
- Enrolment: 1,479
- Houses: Brayford; Ermine; Fosse; Lindum; Stonebow; Witham
- Colour: Navy Blue
- Buildings: Arkwright, Banks, The Brittain Building, Curie, Darwin, Escher, Fibonacci, Galileo, Halley, Irving, Wells, and Wolfson
- Website: www.williamfarr.lincs.sch.uk

William Farr School, formally William Farr C of E Comprehensive School, is a Church of England academy school for 11 to 18-year-olds in the village of Dunholme, Lincolnshire but officially in Welton, Lincolnshire, England, 8 km (5 mi) north-east of Lincoln, near the A46. Despite officially being a part of Welton, most of the school grounds are in the civil parish of Dunholme.

== History ==
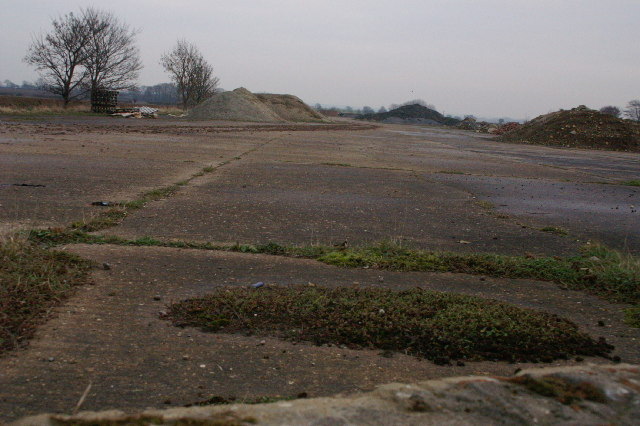
Remains of former RAF Dunholme Lodge at nearby farm

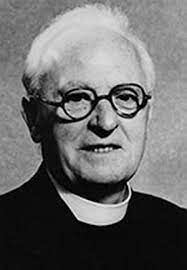
The school's namesake and founder, the Rev William Farr

=== Secondary modern school ===
The school was opened as a secondary modern in 1952 on the site of RAF Dunholme Lodge, a Second World War Bomber Command station, which had been bought for £600 in 1946 by the Reverend William Farr, vicar of Welton. The school was named after him when he died in 1955.

Work started on the £90,000 two-storey building on Friday 23 May 1958.

The school was officially opened on Tuesday 3 May 1960, by the headmaster of Oakham School, John Buchanan, with a dedication by the Bishop of Lincoln, Kenneth Riches, with Chairman of Lindsey County Council Lt-Col Weston Cracroft-Amcotts, of Kettlethorpe Hall, and the architect Sam Scorer, who designed St John the Baptist's Church, Ermine, Lincoln around the same time.

In the 1960s the headmaster was Mr H.P.C. North, who lived on Scothern Lane in Dunholme. Brian Sawyer became headmaster in 1971; he had been the head of English at Blackdown High School, a secondary modern school in Leamington Spa, where he had been for ten years until 1968.

=== Comprehensive ===
The school acquired comprehensive status in 1972, whilst Brian Sawyer was the headmaster. The school had no sixth form.

58 year old Mr Sawyer retired in December 1985. Paul Strong took over from September 1986.

It gained Grant Maintained status in 1992. This latter scheme was later abolished, but the school became a foundation school, a similar arrangement, in 1999.

In 2000, William Farr became a specialist Technology School.

The school became a Science College in 2007.

The school became an independent academy in 2012. Head teacher Paul Strong, prior to his retirement in August 2011, stated he did not want to rename the school; it kept its full title, William Farr Church of England Comprehensive School.

== Sixth form ==
The school was given permission for a sixth form in May 1994. It opened Thursday 7 September 1995, for 60, being the only C of E sixth form in the diocese. The school wanted a sixth form for 23 years. The Queen visited on Friday 11 October 1996, before 3pm to open the sixth form. The Queen flew into RAF Waddington at 11.25am in the morning, to open the new University of Lincoln, visiting the school in the afternoon, for the new £500,000 sixth form block. They also have built a new 6th form block which opened in September 2025.

== 1992 fire ==
On the early morning of Sunday 24 May 1992, a fire destroyed the science block. Two 14 year olds were charged, and appeared in court on 1 July 1992. There was £350,000 of damage. A 15 year old was convicted of arson in early March 1993; the teenagers acquired the plan from watching the 1989 film Heathers.

== Any Questions programme ==
On 11 March 1988 the Radio 4 Any Questions? programme was broadcast from the school. When the live broadcast was taking place, vandals cut through an important cable. Sound was lost during a discussion on drink driving. Technicians at the BBC could not make any repairs, so music was played for the last fifteen minutes. No-one in the audience knew what had happened until the recording had ended. Some males at the school had mentioned before the broadcast that an attempt would be made to take the broadcast off air. The headmaster initially disbelieved such possibilities of deliberate interference. Once the headmaster investigated likely possibilities, he found that four males had severed the telecommunication line to the school, and immediately suspended the four vandals, with two aged 15, and two aged 14. The decision was made by the chairman of the governors Mike Bonass.

The four were interviewed by Lincolnshire Police at Market Rasen.

== School performance ==
Before the school became an academy, Ofsted inspected and judged it as follows:

- 2000: "a very good school, with many excellent features"
- 2006: Outstanding
- 2009: Outstanding
- 2022: Good

In 2007, the school was a National Support School.

In 2019, the school's Progress 8 benchmark at GCSE was above average. The proportion of its students entering the English Baccalaureate was low. 56% of children achieved Grade 5 or above in English and maths GCSEs, compared to 43% nationally. Progress at A level was below average and the average result was C+, the same as the national figure.

Four staff members have received awards. Helen Brittain, Head of History, received the 2008 Guardian award for teacher of the year at the East Midlands Conference Centre at the University of Nottingham. The award was also given to Elizabeth Hanson in 2011 and Christopher Mattley in 2015. Paul Strong, head teacher 1986-2011, was awarded Head Teacher of the Year at the Commendation in the National Teaching Awards in 2009, the Ted Wragg Lifetime Achievement Award 2010, and an OBE in at the Queen's Diamond Jubilee Birthday Honours 2012.

== School buildings ==
The old former wartime buildings were replaced in 1960. The sports hall was built in 1974, and the sixth form added in 1995. The sports hall was extensively refurbished in 2012, and renamed after Paralympian Sophie Wells in c.2022. Queen Elizabeth II and Prince Philip visited the school in October 1996 to open a new humanities building, named after Joseph Banks.

There was a further building programme in the 2000s.

The Lawres Chapel was opened in 2004 by the then Bishop of Lincoln, John Saxbee. It is home to the Helen Alwyn memorial window and the RAF Book of Remembrance, which honours those who served and died during the Second World War and were stationed here at RAF Dunholme Lodge. Every day, members of Year 7 have the responsibility of turning a page. The chapel is always open and available to all members of the school of any faith or none.

In 2025, the construction of a new purpose-built Sixth Form block was completed named after the same Helen Brittain who received the 2008 teaching award for her many years of outstanding service to the school and to history education as a whole. The building was named The Brittain Building, as a surprise to Mrs Brittain with a new portrait in the entrance. She opened the building in a ceremony along with the Bishop of Lincoln in recognition of the school's Church of England status. The Brittain Building was opened as part of a wide-ranging set of school reforms including the introduction of non-A Level qualifications for Sixth Form students and the ending of individual subjects' independence, with them instead being amalgamated into a larger set of departments such as humanities and sciences, and the lowering of grade requirements for admission to the Sixth Form, as the ending of a process that had been ongoing for a few years to bring them in line with other comprehensive schools, rather than matching most local grammar schools as they had done previously.

=== The William Farr School Museum ===
There were plans for an RAF museum at the school in September 2015. The project aims to create a museum to celebrate and preserve the history of RAF Dunholme Lodge, which inhabited the site before the school opened. The school had a special Nissen hut constructed at the school to house the artefacts it has collected over the last few years. A conservation specialist was employed to advise the academy on how to best display and preserve the material they have. Foundations of many of the old RAF buildings were discovered in William Farr Wood behind the school, planned to be used for an interpretive trail, with help from a woodland management team. The centre appealed for photographs and artefacts that may still be in the community.

== Notable ex-pupils ==
- Tracy Borman, historian and broadcaster
- Martha Harris, footballer
- Simon Wainwright, who swam butterfly in the 100m and 200m at the 1992 Olympics; his brother Tim also swam competitively
