= RAF Dunholme Lodge =

Former RAF station in Lincolnshire, England

RAF Dunholme Lodge
- Dunholme, Lincolnshire in England

Site information
- Type: Royal Air Force station * Parent station 1943–44
- Code: DL
- Owner: Ministry of Defence
- Operator: Royal Air Force
- Controlled by: RAF Bomber Command * No. 1 Group RAF * No. 5 Group RAF

Location
- Shown within Lincolnshire
- Coordinates: 53°17′28″N 000°30′19″W

Site history
- Built: 1942
- In use: 1941–1944; 1959–1964
- Battles/wars: European theatre of World War II; Cold War

Airfield information
- Elevation: 30 metres (98 ft) AMSL
Runways
Direction	Length and surface
00/00	Concrete/Tarmac
00/00	Concrete/Tarmac
00/00	Concrete/Tarmac

Royal Air Force Dunholme Lodge or more simply RAF Dunholme Lodge was a Royal Air Force station located between the parishes of Welton and Dunholme in Lincolnshire, England.

== History ==
The grass airfield was first used by the Royal Air Force during 1941 and 1942 for use by Handley Page Hampden aircraft from nearby RAF Scampton, and was officially opened as an RAF station in September 1942 as part of RAF Bomber Command with the building of three hard runways.

The main occupier of the station was 44 Squadron, with the Avro Lancaster four-engined heavy bomber, which moved in from RAF Waddington in May 1943 and stayed until it moved to RAF Spilsby in September 1944.

In November 1944 flying operations ceased due to the proximity of other stations which did not allow night flying. At the end of the war 120 Lancasters had been lost on operations from Dunholme Lodge.

From 1948 the site was host to motorcycle and car racing until 1959 when the base was reopened as an active RAF station.

The William Farr School was opened in 1952 on part of the disused domestic site.

On re-opening in 1959, the airfield became a site for Bristol Bloodhound surface-to-air missiles with 141 Squadron until it was disbanded and the station finally closed in 1964.

== Based units ==
Unit	Aircraft	From	To	To	Notes
No. 44 Squadron RAF	Avro Lancaster I/III	31 May 1943	30 September 1944	RAF Spilsby	Squadron Code:KM.
No. 141 Squadron RAF	Bristol Bloodhound I	1 April 1959	31 March 1964	Disbanded	Surface-to-Air Missile.
No. 170 Squadron RAF	Avro Lancaster I/III	22 October 1944	29 November 1944	RAF Hemswell	Squadron Code:TC.
No. 619 Squadron RAF	Avro Lancaster I/III	17 April 1944	28 September 1944	RAF Strubby	Squadron Code:PG.

The following units were also here at some point:

- Detachment of No. 14 (Pilots) Advanced Flying Unit RAF (April 1942)
- No. 1485 (Bomber) Gunnery Flight RAF (August – October 1942)
- No. 1518 (Beam Approach Training) Flight RAF
- No. 2799 Squadron RAF Regiment, a Light Anti-Aircraft squadron.
- Air Bomber Training Flight, No. 5 Group (August – October 1942)
- General Aircraft Limited

== Current use ==
Bits of the runways still exist and the site is now used for farming.
