= Faldingworth =

Village and civil parish in the West Lindsey district of Lincolnshire, England

Coordinates: 53.349432°N 0.396984°W

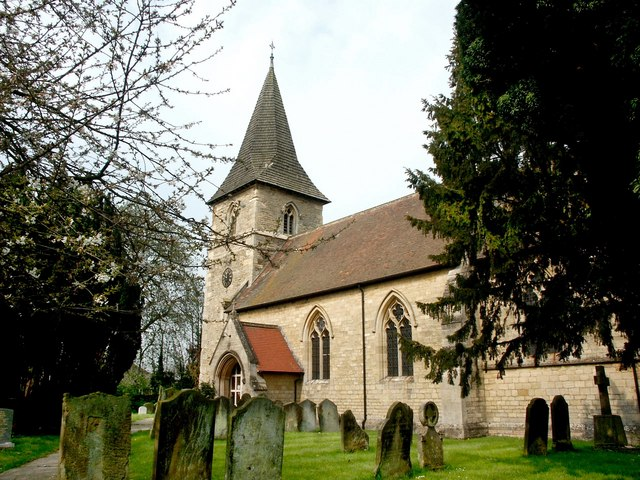
- Church of All Saints, Faldingworth

- Location within Lincolnshire
- Population: 400 (2011)
- OS grid reference: TF058848
  - London: 130 mi (210 km) S
- District: West Lindsey
- Shire county: Lincolnshire
- Region: East Midlands
- Country: England
- Sovereign state: United Kingdom
- Post town: Market Rasen
- Postcode district: LN8
- Police: Lincolnshire
- Fire: Lincolnshire
- Ambulance: East Midlands
- UK Parliament: Gainsborough

Faldingworth is a village and civil parish in the West Lindsey district of Lincolnshire, England. It is situated on the A46, and approximately 5 miles (8 km) south-west from Market Rasen. Spridlington parish lies to the west, and Friesthorpe parish to the south-east. Faldingworth parish covers just over 2,500 acres (10 km^{2}). The 2001 census recorded a Faldingworth population of 253, increasing to 400 at the 2011 census.

Faldingworth Grade II listed Anglican church, dedicated to All Saints, was rebuilt in 1818 and again in 1890. There is a foundation stone dated 1890 beneath the east chancel window. The church seats 150 people. The Anglican parish dates from 1549, and is currently part of the Middle Rasen Group of parishes. The village formerly had a Methodist chapel, though this has now closed.

Faldingworth has a primary school serving the parishes of Faldingworth, Buslingthorpe, Newton, Freisthorpe and Snarford. A Council School was built in 1828, and was enlarged in 1876 and again in 1889.

The village also has the Coach and Horses public house and a village hall; its post office and village shop have closed.

RAF Faldingworth was used by Bomber Command during the Second World War, and although the station closed in 1972 parts of the airfield still exist. This was a Polish base, and a memorial to those who flew and failed to return is on the old airfield. There is also a memorial window and some memorabilia in the church.
