= Lissington =

Village and civil parish in the West Lindsey district of Lincolnshire, England

Coordinates: 53.335302°N 0.336293°W

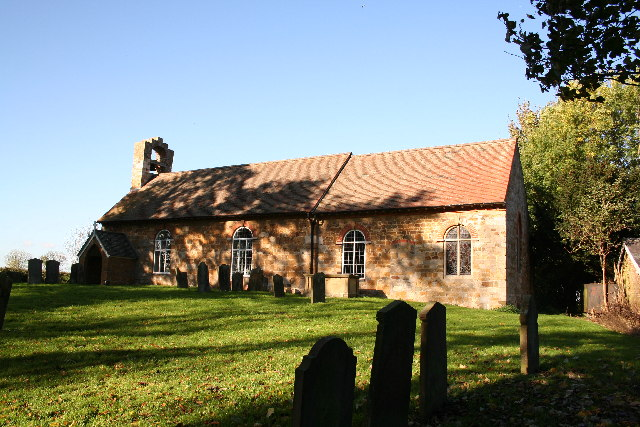
- St John the Baptist Church, Lissington

- Location within Lincolnshire
- Population: 154 (2011)
- OS grid reference: TF108833
  - London: 130 mi (210 km) S
- District: West Lindsey
- Shire county: Lincolnshire
- Region: East Midlands
- Country: England
- Sovereign state: United Kingdom
- Post town: Lincoln
- Postcode district: LN3
- Police: Lincolnshire
- Fire: Lincolnshire
- Ambulance: East Midlands
- UK Parliament: Gainsborough

Lissington is a village and civil parish in the West Lindsey district of Lincolnshire, England. The population of the civil parish at the 2011 census was 154. It lies 4 miles (6 km) south from the town of Market Rasen, and about 4 miles north from the town of Wragby.

Lissington is listed in the 1086 Domesday Book as "Lessintone", with 28 households, and 80 acres (0.32 km^{2}) of meadow and 80 of woodland.

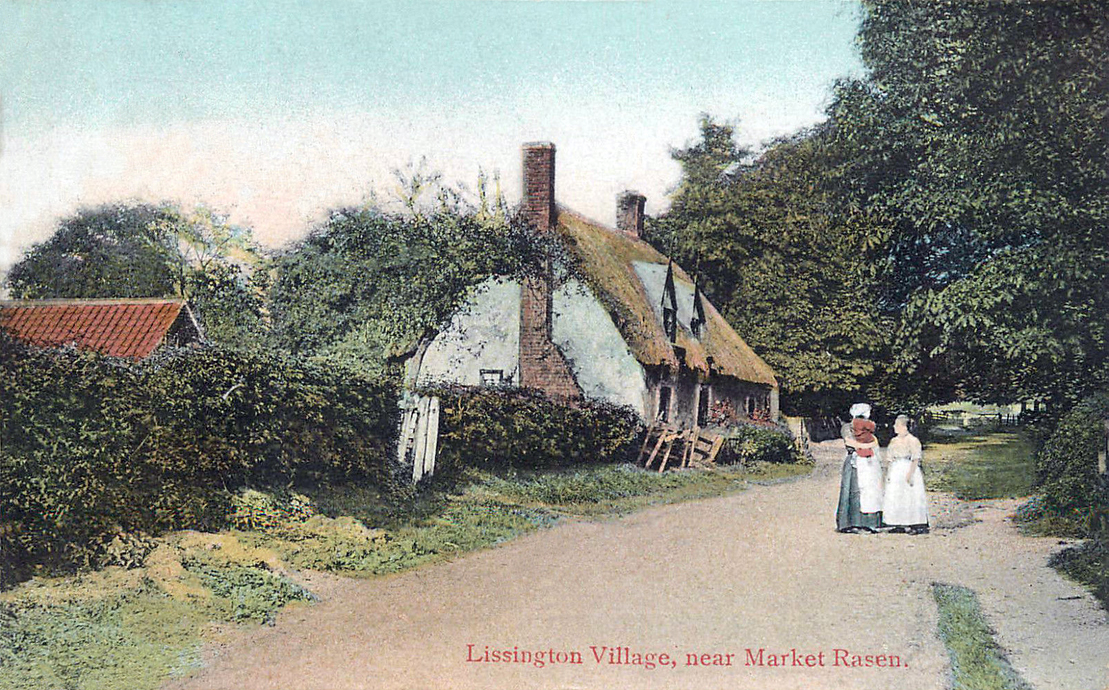
Lissington, before 1914

The church, dedicated to Saint John the Baptist, is a Grade II listed building built from ironstone and greenstone. It dates from 1796, with a restoration in 1895 and further additions in 1925.

Lissington Church of England School was built in 1854 as a National school and closed 21 December 1950.
