= Dunholme =

Village in Lincolnshire, England

Coordinates: 53.300758°N 0.466284°W

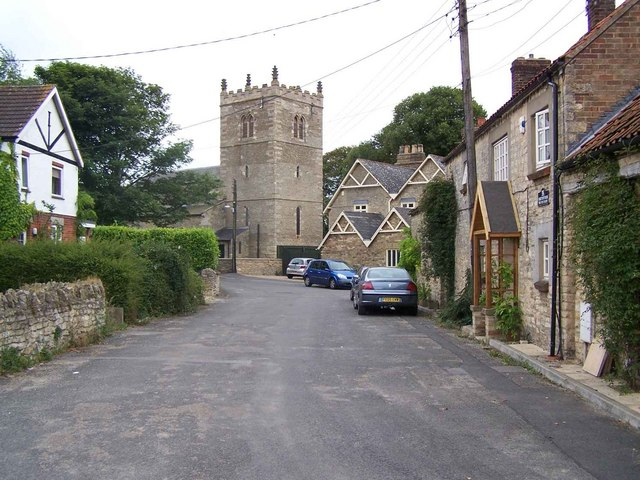
- Church of St Chad, Dunholme

- Location within Lincolnshire
- Population: 2,054 (2011)
- OS grid reference: TF023792
  - London: 125 mi (201 km) S
- District: West Lindsey
- Shire county: Lincolnshire
- Region: East Midlands
- Country: England
- Sovereign state: United Kingdom
- Post town: Lincoln
- Postcode district: LN2
- Police: Lincolnshire
- Fire: Lincolnshire
- Ambulance: East Midlands
- UK Parliament: Gainsborough
- Website: dunholme-pc.gov.uk

Dunholme is a village and civil parish in the West Lindsey district of Lincolnshire, England. It is situated on the A46 road, and 5 miles (8 km) north-east of Lincoln. The earliest written evidence concerning Dunholme is found in the 1086 Domesday Book.

There are multiple theories on the origins of the village's name. One presented in The Place and River Names of the West Riding of Lindsey is that the name of the village is derived from "Dunham" from 'dun' meaning hill, and 'ham' meaning river bend. An alternative origin by Ekwall suggests the name came from "Donna's ham", meaning the 'ham' or enclosure of Dunna, possible an Anglo-Saxon.

Within the village, Dunholme has a post office, a village shop, St Chad's CE Primary School on Ryland Road.

The parish church is dedicated to Saint Chad, and is a Grade I listed building, built in Early English style. It contains a kneeling effigy to Robert Grantham (died 1616), which was restored in 1856 and 1892. The church forms part of the benefice of Welton, Dunholme and Scothern. The rood screen was carved by the Congolese sculptor Mahomet Thomas Phillips.

RAF Dunholme Lodge airfield was used by RAF Bomber Command during the Second World War. It closed in 1964 and little remains. Some of the land was purchased by Rev William Farr in 1946 for the site of William Farr School.

Every summer, the village holds a village fête. The fête is held in the centre of the village near the church and involves a duck race alongside many other activities.

The village has a camera club.

== Local history ==
Dunholme has had a significant impact on Lincolnshire history. Terence Leach, who was headmaster of the village primary school, was a passionate advocate of Lincolnshire history and wrote a number of books on the areas's history. He is best known as the author of a series of books on Lincolnshire country houses. He also helped create the annual Brackenbury Lectures in aid of the Raithby Methodist Chapel. More recently Adrian Gray, the son of a former vicar of Dunholme, has published several books on Lincolnshire history.

== Economy ==
=== Sugar beet research ===
Dunholme Field Station, near Dunholme Holt, had operated since 1935. The buildings were not sufficient by the late 1950s. Plant pathologist Raymond Hull had run the Dunholme site from 1949. The Dunholme research station was run by the Rothamsted Experimental Station, and funded by the Sugar Beet Research and Education Committee. Around 1961-62 the sugar beet research moved to what is now Broom's Barn Experimental Station in Higham, West Suffolk, near the A14.

== Education ==
William Farr C of E Comprehensive School is partially located within the parish boundary and is accessible from Honeyholes Lane in the village of Dunholme, however the main entrance is located on Lincoln Road in Welton.

== Geography ==
The village stands almost exactly in the centre of its parish, on the banks of the Welton Beck, which follows into the village from Welton in the north.

Work on the A46 bypass started in February 1987, being built by A.F. Budge. The bypass was opened on Friday 13 November 1987, by Zena Scoley, the chairman of the county council. The bypass cost £1m, and was 1.5 miles long.

== Notable former residents ==
- During Operation Black Buck on 27 May 1982, one of the two Vulcan pilots was 47 year old Squadron Leader Calum McDougall DFC, of 50 Squadron, originally from Glasgow. He landed his Avro Vulcan XM597 in Brazil, after his refuelling probe had broken, and the Argentines had switched off the AN/TPS-43 air defence radar, which his AGM-45 Shrike was intended to find. The Argentine air defence was never ultimately hit. His Vulcan aircraft is at the National Museum of Flight in Scotland
