= Friesthorpe =

Settlement and civil parish in the West Lindsey district of Lincolnshire, England

Coordinates: 53.3366°N 0.3910°W

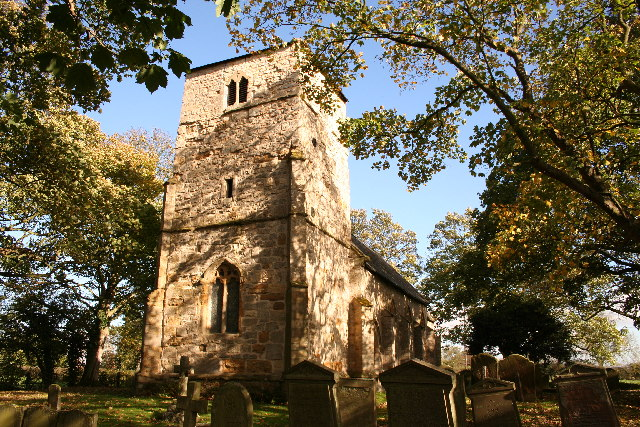
- Church of St Peter, Friesthorpe

- Location within Lincolnshire
- Population: 204 (2011)
- OS grid reference: TF0783
  - London: 110 mi (180 km) S
- District: West Lindsey
- Shire county: Lincolnshire
- Region: East Midlands
- Country: England
- Sovereign state: United Kingdom
- Post town: Lincoln
- Postcode district: LN3
- Police: Lincolnshire
- Fire: Lincolnshire
- Ambulance: East Midlands
- UK Parliament: Gainsborough

Friesthorpe is a settlement and civil parish in the West Lindsey district of Lincolnshire, England. The population of the civil parish (including Snarford and Snelland) at the 2011 census was 204. It is situated 4 miles (6 km) south-west from the town of Market Rasen, 9 miles (14 km) north-east from the city and county town of Lincoln, and just east from the A46 road.

Friesthorpe Grade II listed Anglican church is dedicated to St Peter. The church is of 13th-century origin, and was rebuilt in 1841 except for the tower.
