= Spridlington =

Village and civil parish in the West Lindsey district of Lincolnshire, England

Coordinates: 53.348115°N 0.486648°W

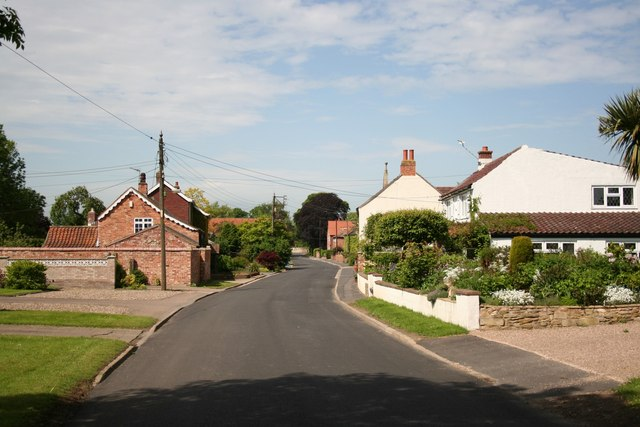
- Spridlington village

- Location within Lincolnshire
- Population: 213 (2011)
- OS grid reference: TF008845
  - London: 135 mi (217 km) S
- District: West Lindsey
- Shire county: Lincolnshire
- Region: East Midlands
- Country: England
- Sovereign state: United Kingdom
- Post town: MARKET RASEN
- Postcode district: LN8
- Police: Lincolnshire
- Fire: Lincolnshire
- Ambulance: East Midlands
- UK Parliament: Gainsborough

Spridlington is a village and civil parish in the West Lindsey district of Lincolnshire, England. It is situated approximately 8 miles (13 km) north from the city and county town of Lincoln, and just off the A15 road. According to the 2001 Census the village had a population of 194, increasing to 213 at the 2011 census. The village is part of the Owmby Group of parishes.

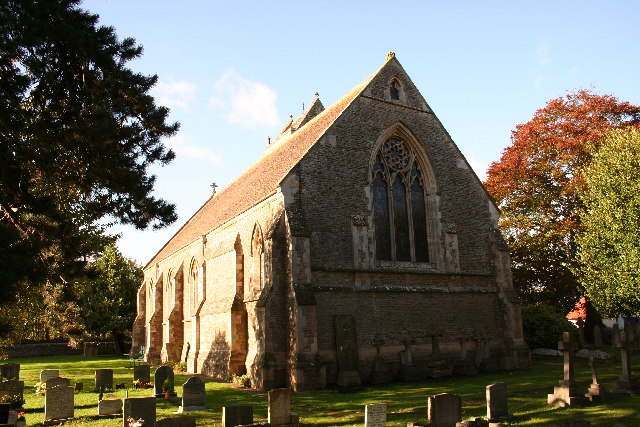
St Hilary's Church, Spridlington

The parish church of St Hilary's dates from 1875. It replaced an earlier church dedicated to St Hilary and St Albinus – originally there were two churches in the village, but the site of St Albinus is unrecorded.

By July 2007, St Hilary's had raised enough money to have its organ renovated. The restoration project was completed and the historic Thomas Nicholson organ was re-dedicated by the Bishop of Lincoln on St Hilary's Day, 13 January 2008.

There is also a village hall.
