= Welton Rural District =

Former rural district in Lincolnshire, England

- Former subdivision of United Kingdom
- 1894–1974
- Welton Rural District shown within Parts of Lindsey in 1970.
- Capital: Welton
- Area
  - Coordinates: 53.3°N 0.4°W
- History
  - Succeeded by: West Lindsey
- Status: Rural district
- Historical era: 20th century
  - Established: 1894
  - Disestablished: 1 April 1974
Preceded by	Succeeded by
Lincoln Rural Sanitary District	West Lindsey
- Today part of: United Kingdom

Welton was a rural district in Lincolnshire, Parts of Lindsey from 1894 to 1974. It was formed under the Local Government Act 1894 from that part of the Lincoln rural sanitary district which was in Lindsey – the Kesteven part forming the Branston Rural District. It was named after Welton.

The district was abolished under the Local Government Act 1972, becoming part of the West Lindsey district of Lincolnshire.

== List of parishes in Welton Rural District ==
Parish	Description	Duration	Notes
Aisthorpe	Parish (ancient), civil parish	1894–1974	also known as East Thorpe
Apley	Parish (ancient), civil parish	1894–1974	
Bardney	Parish (ancient), civil parish	1894–1974	
Barlings	Parish (ancient), civil parish	1894–1974	
Brattleby	Parish (ancient), civil parish	1894–1974	
Broxholme	Parish (ancient), civil parish	1894–1974	
Bullington	Chapelry, civil parish	1894–1974	
Burton	Parish (ancient), civil parish	1894–1974	
Caenby	Parish (ancient), civil parish	1894–1974	
Cammeringham	Parish (ancient), civil parish	1894–1974	
Cherry Willingham	Parish (ancient), civil parish	1894–1974	
Cold Hanworth	Parish (ancient), civil parish	1894–1974	
Coldstead	extraparochial, civil parish	1894–1974	
Dunholme	Parish (ancient), civil parish	1894–1974	
East Firsby	chapelry, parish (ancient), civil parish	1894–1974	
Faldingworth	Parish (ancient), civil parish	1894–1974	
Fiskerton	Parish (ancient), civil parish	1894–1974	
Friesthorpe	Parish (ancient), civil parish	1894–1974	
Fulnetby	Chapelry, civil parish	1894–1974	
Goltho	Parish (ancient), civil parish	1894–1974	
Grange de Lings	extraparochial, civil parish	1894–1974	
Greetwell	Parish (ancient), civil parish	1894–1974	
Hackthorn	Parish (ancient), civil parish	1894–1974	
Holton cum Beckering	Parish (ancient), civil parish	1894–1974	
Ingham	Parish (ancient), civil parish	1894–1974	
Nettleham	Parish (ancient), civil parish	1894–1974	
Newball	hamlet, civil parish	1894–1974	
Normanby by Spital	Parish (ancient), civil parish	1894–1974	
North Carlton	Parish (ancient), civil parish	1894–1974	
Owmby	Parish (ancient), civil parish	1894–1974	
Rand	Parish (ancient), civil parish	1894–1974	
Reepham	Chapelry, civil parish	1894–1974	
Riseholme	Parish (ancient), civil parish	1894–1974	
Saxby	Parish (ancient), civil parish	1894–1974	
Saxelby with Ingleby	Parish (ancient), civil parish	1894–1974	sometimes Saxilby
Scampton	Parish (ancient), civil parish	1894–1974	
Scothern	Parish (ancient), civil parish	1894–1974	
Snarford	Parish (ancient), civil parish	1894–1974	
Snelland	Parish (ancient), civil parish	1894–1974	
South Carlton	Parish (ancient), civil parish	1894–1974	
Spridlington	Parish (ancient), civil parish	1894–1974	
Stainfield	Chapelry, civil parish	1894–1974	
Stainton by Langworth	Parish (ancient), civil parish	1894–1974	
Sudbrooke	Parish (ancient), civil parish	1894–1974	
Thorpe in the Fallows	Parish (ancient), civil parish	1894–1974	also known as West Thorpe
Welton	Parish (ancient), civil parish	1894–1974	
West Firsby	township, civil parish	1894–1974	
Wickenby	Parish (ancient), civil parish	1894–1974	
