= A158 road =

Road in England

A158

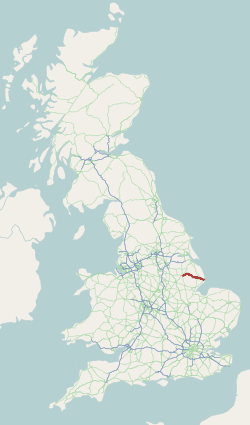
- Click map to enlarge

Route information
- Length: 41 mi (66 km)

Major junctions
- From: Lincoln
- A15 A157 A153; A16 A1028; A52
- To: Skegness

Location
- Country: United Kingdom

Road network
- Roads in the United Kingdom; Motorways; A and B road zones

The A158 road is a major route that heads from Lincoln in the west to Skegness on the east coast. The road is located entirely in the county of Lincolnshire and is single carriageway for almost its entirety. The road is approximately 40 miles (64 km) long. The road gets quite congested with holiday traffic during the summer.

== Route ==
=== Lincoln to Horncastle ===
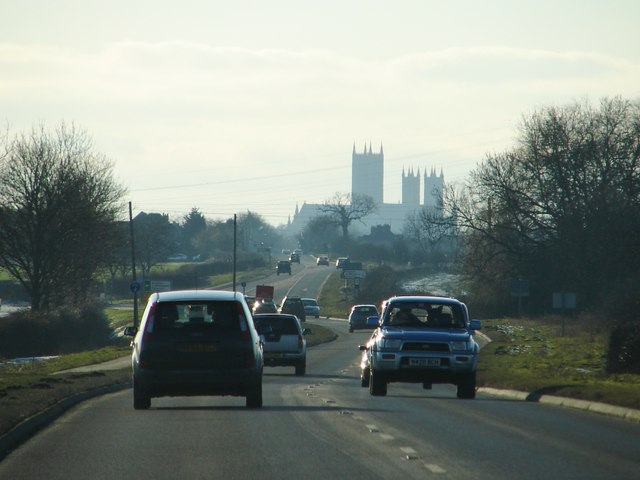
Approach to Lincoln at North Greetwell

Before the Lincoln Bypass was built (in stages) in the mid-1980s, the A158 historically went along Wragby Road (now the A15). Even earlier the A158 followed the northern end of Canwick Road, the former B1188, over Pelham Bridge since its opening in 1958, and along South Park Avenue which was also built in 1958, to meet the former A46 at St Catherine's. This was parallel to the former western section B1190. The A15 at the time followed the west of Lincoln town centre, then along Silver Street.

The road begins at a roundabout where the A15 Lincoln Eastern bypass links up with the rest of the bypass. From here the route heads north-east through the village of North Greetwell along a former Roman road, where it is the parish boundary between Nettleham to the north and Greetwell to the south, Nettleham and Reepham, then Sudbrooke and Reepham. It passes Sudbrooke to the south, where there is a crossroads, with the main road for Sudbrooke to the left, and Star Energy's Welton Gathering Centre (in Reepham) for the Welton oilfield (part of the East Midlands Oil Province). The Cherry Tree Cafe is at the junction. It passes to the south of Sudbrooke Park (a Scout camp site), and crosses the Lincoln to Grimsby railway in the parish of Barlings, next to the Oriental Express Restaurant (former Station Inn). At Langworth there is a crossroads for Scothern, to the left, and Barlings, to the right, and passes St Hugh's church and The George at Langworth. It crosses the Barlings Eau at Langworth Bridge and there is a left turn for Stainton by Langworth, and a right turn for Newball, and the Woodside Wildlife and Falconry Park.

Further on in the parish of Stainton by Langworth, near Rand Wood, the B1399 heads north-east while the A158 changes direction and heads east to Wragby. In Bullington it passes Bullington Hall and in Rand, it passes Brown Cow Farm, and there is a left turn for Rand and Rand Farm Park. The Rand Group construction company was based there until October 2009 when it went into administration. It is briefly the parish boundary between Rand, to the north, and Goltho, to the south, and passes Goltho Gardens, with a teashop. Approaching Wragby it enters East Lindsey. Here it crosses the B1202 at traffic lights near the Turnor Arms then forks with the A157 which heads through the Lincolnshire Wolds to Louth. The A157 formerly followed the A158's current route to Lincoln, and the A158's western terminus was at Wragby before the 1940s. It passes the parish church of All Saints, and crosses the former Louth to Bardney Line. From here the route gets quite twisty then heads south-east around the south end of the Wolds. It crosses Stainfield Back at Langton Bridge, and passes through Langton by Wragby, where there is a left turn on a bend for Panton, then a right turn on a bend for Chambers Farm Wood, part of the Lincolnshire Limewoods nature reserve. At Hatton Bridge, it is the parish boundary between Langton by Wragby, to the west and Hatton, to the east.

There are crossroads for Hatton, to the left, and another crossroads at the (unoccupied) New Midge Inn, where the road becomes the parish boundary with Minting to the south. At Baumber the B1225 joins from the north as the A158 continues towards in a more southerly direction towards the town of Horncastle. The B1190 and B1191 both join just outside Horncastle where the road crosses the A153.

=== Horncastle to Skegness ===
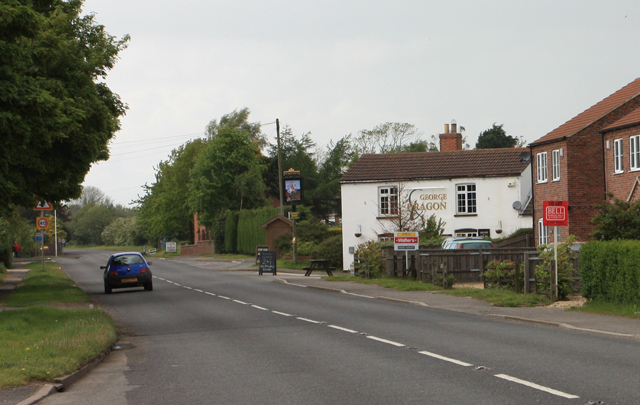
The A158 in Hagworthingham

After leaving Horncastle the route heads east with the B1195 heading off 2.6 miles (4.2 km) later to Spilsby. Further on the road passes through the village of Hagworthingham. The road then reaches a roundabout with the A16 at Partney. Both roads used to go through Partney but now bypass it. The construction of this bypass was preceded by a significant archaeological investigation. The A158 continues east until reaching another roundabout with the A1028 which provides a short cut from the A16 further north. The B1196 also heads up to Alford from here. The A158 becomes dual-carriageway for 1 mile (1.6 km) from here until becoming single again through Gunby. The road then joins with the newly opened Burgh Bypass, before finally reaching Skegness where it terminates at a junction with the A52 (53.1496°N 0.3395°E).
