= Newball =

Coordinates: 53.268248°N 0.37863902°W

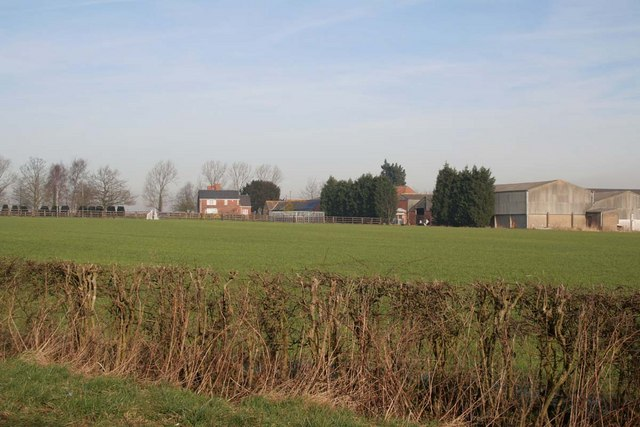

- Location within Lincolnshire
- Area: 6.66 km^{2} (2.57 sq mi)
- Population: 54 (2001 census)
  - Density: 8/km^{2} (21/sq mi)
- Civil parish: Newball
- District: West Lindsey
- Shire county: Lincolnshire
- Region: East Midlands
- Country: England
- Sovereign state: United Kingdom
- Police: Lincolnshire
- Fire: Lincolnshire
- Ambulance: East Midlands

Newball is a settlement and civil parish about 7 miles from Lincoln, in the West Lindsey district, in the county of Lincolnshire, England. In 2001 the parish had a population of 54. The parish touches Apley, Barlings, Bullington, Fulnetby and Stainton By Langworth.

== History ==
The name "Newball" means 'New fortification'. Newball was recorded in the Domesday Book as Neuberie. In 1331 a manorial chapel was licensed for the manor of John de Bayeux. Newball was a township in the parish of Stainton-by Langworth it became a separate parish in 1866. On 24 March 1887 part of Bullington was transferred to the parish. On 1 April 1935 the parish of Coldstead was abolished and merged with Newball.
