= Star Energy =

UK energy company

Star Energy Group plc
- Company type: Listed on Alternative Investment Market
- Industry: Petroleum, gas and geothermal
- Founded: October 1999; 26 years ago
- Headquarters: Grand Buildings, 1-3 Strand, London, WC2N 5EJ
- Area served: UK, Croatia
- Products: Energy
- Website: Star Energy

Star Energy is a British oil, gas and geothermal company. It was a British onshore oil exploration company until it was acquired by IGas Energy in December, 2011. Igas then rebranded to Star Energy Group. The company expanded into geothermal.

The company should not be confused with Star Energy Geothermal in Indonesia, which is part of Barito Renewables Energy.

== History ==
It was formed in October 1999 essentially as a management buyout of operations in the Weald Basin, acquired from Soco International. The buyout was funded by European Acquisition Capital.

In June 2000, it expanded when it acquired the assets of Roc Oil in the East Midlands Oil Province.

In May 2004 it became a public company, listed on the Alternative Investment Market (AIM). In August 2005, it bought Pentex Oil, and increased its portfolio greatly in the East Midlands. These fields are based near Welton, Lincolnshire at Reepham, near its railway station.

In November 2005 it opened its first gas storage facility at the depleted Humbly Grove oil field, near Lasham in Hampshire. On 7 March 2008, it de-listed from the AIM stock market, becoming subsidiary of Petronas.

In December 2011 all assets, with the exception of Humbly Grove were acquired by IGas .

IGas Energy Plc was an independent oil and gas exploration and production company, incorporated and operating in the United Kingdom, with headquarters in London. The company started and incorporated in 2003 to produce natural gas, primarily coalbed methane. It grew by acquiring Nexen Exploration and Star Energy in 2011, and PR Singleton Limited in 2013. Since December 2011 company shares have traded on the London Stock Exchange under the symbol IGAS.

Since its inception, the company has produced from conventional oil and gas, and coalbed methane reservoirs. The company also holds licences in the Gainsborough Trough, which has been its main focus of shale gas exploration since 2010. IGas has permits for, and plans to drill two shale gas test holes in the Bowland Basin in late 2013; IGas does not have permits to hydraulically fracture the test wells.

=== Barton Moss ===
During 2013 and 2014, IGas explored for coalbed methane at Barton Moss between Irlam and Peel Green in Salford, Greater Manchester. This resulted in direct action protests at the site and criticism of Greater Manchester Police's handling of the protest. In 2025 Star Energy decommissioned the site.

== Structure ==
It is based on the Strand in the City of Westminster.

=== Divisions ===
Star Energy Group Ltd is the main company based in London, but it also has nine other smaller companies which house its operations, which include

- Star Energy Weald Basin Ltd, based at the Holybourne.
- Star Energy (East Midlands) Ltd, based at the Welton Gathering Centre and operates the fields of Welton, Stainton, Nettleham, Cold Hanworth, Scampton, Scampton North, and Eskdale.
- Star Energy Oil and Gas Ltd, based near Gainsborough, and operates the fields at Beckingham, Egmanton, Corringham, Glentworth, East Glentworth, Rempstone, Long Clawson, Bothamstall, and South Leverton.
