= Keith Albarn =

English artist (1939–2024)

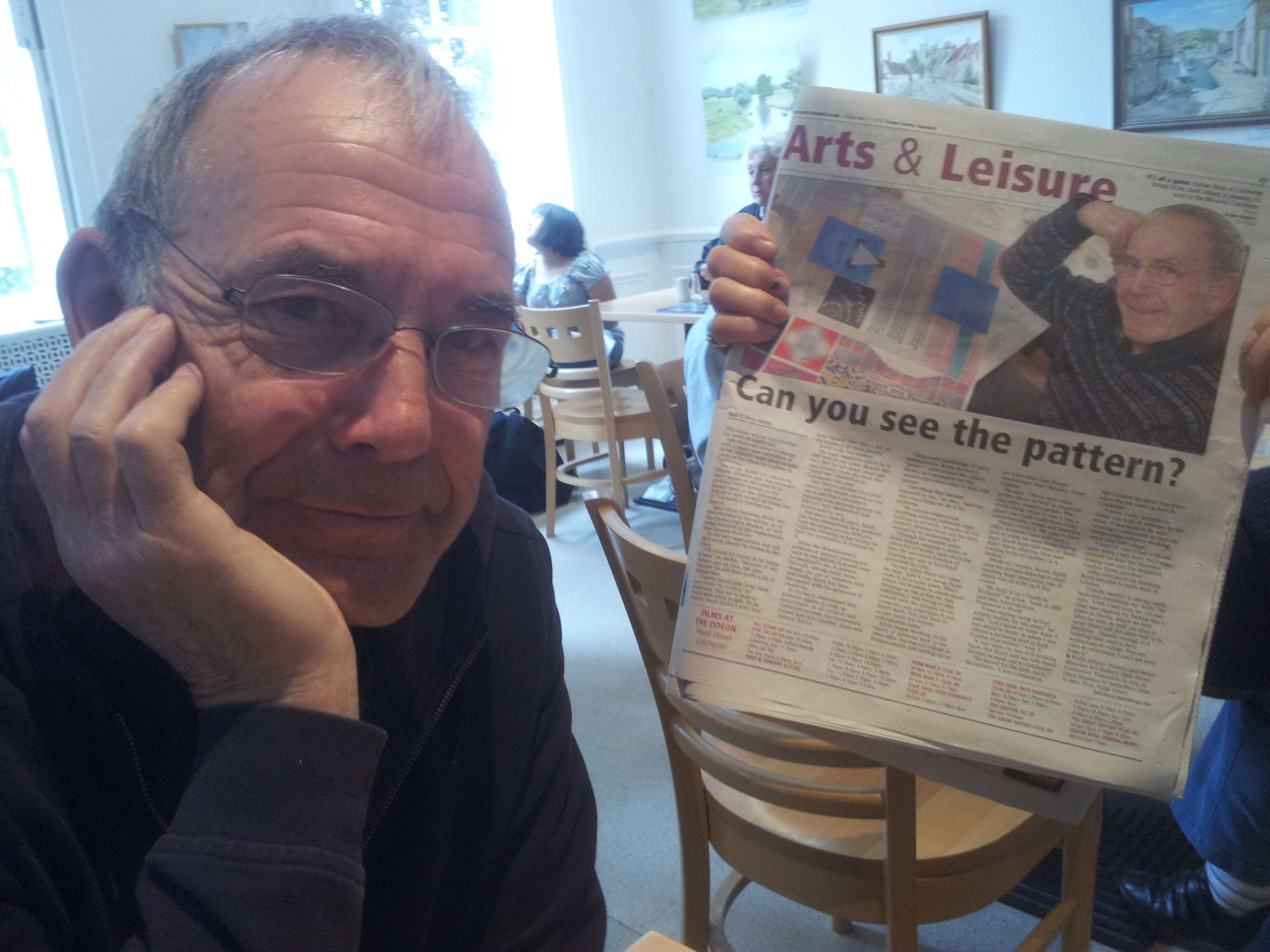
- Albarn sitting next to wife Hazel
- Born: 28 January 1939; Nottingham, England
- Died: 23 July 2024 (aged 85)
- Education: Nottingham Trent University, School of Art and Design
- Known for: Mathematics and art, systems art, psychedelia, design
- Children: 2, including Damon Albarn

Keith Albarn (28 January 1939 – 23 July 2024) was an English artist. He was the father of musician Damon Albarn and artist Jessica Albarn.

== Family ==
Albarn was son of Edward Albarn (1912–2002) and (Lucy) Joan, née Hockley (1912–2000), from Sileby; his father was an architect who trained at the School of Architecture at Leicester College of Arts and Technology; his mother had trained as an art teacher there. His parents married on Thursday 23 December 1937 at St. Mary Magdalen Church in Knighton, Leicester.

His 27-year-old father was registered as a conscientious objector in July 1940, and had left the Church of England to join the Society of Friends (Quakers). Edward Albarn set up as an architect in Lincoln with Ian Caldwell, as Davis Caldwell and Albarn. Edward Albarn lived on Evington Road in Leicester in the 1920s, and had a brother Roy Albarn (1 January 1911 – August 1994), a preacher with the Baptist, Congregational and City Mission churches, who also registered as a conscientious objector in Liverpool in September 1940.

From Monday 27 September 1965, his father gave a series of twenty-four weekly adult education talks on church architecture, in conjunction with the University of Nottingham, at a grammar school in Grantham, Lincolnshire; the course cost 24 shillings and six pence. In the late 1960s, his father Edward lived at The Hall, at Holton cum Beckering.

His grandfather was also called Edward Albarn (23 June 1881 – 1972), who had the furniture business Albarn and Axworthy on Belvoir Street in Leicester; his grandfather had tried to commit suicide, by slashing his neck at St Pancras railway station on Sunday 10 April 1927. His grandfather survived, and recuperated at the Royal Free Hospital in London. His grandfather had moved to Coventry by the mid-1930s.

== Early life ==
Albarn attended West Bridgford Grammar School. He was a conscientious objector to post-World War National Service, following his father, Edward Albarn, who had been a conscientious objector in World War II. At school, he played Romeo in the school Romeo and Juliet play, with Jill Cook as Juliet, in March 1956. In March 1957 he played the lead role in Othello, and again opposite Jill Cook who played Desdemona; the Nottingham Guardian Journal described his acting as convincing and moving, with Jill Cook being described as tender. The play had three main performances. Albarn was raised at Ruddington; his brother was born on 12 April 1944 at Nottingham Women's Hospital. (a former hospital next to the NTU Wetherspoons establishment).

Albarn studied architecture at Nottingham School of Art, where he met fellow student Hazel Dring, whom he married in 1963 in Legsby. They moved to London, where he studied sculpture at Hammersmith School of Art.

His wife's father, Vernon Dring MBE (1966 New Year Honours), was the son of John George Dring, who met Mary Bowser at her sister Olive's home in Fulnetby, the fourth daughter of Alfred Bowser. Vernon Dring had 1,000 acres. They married on Saturday 23 May 1936 at St John's church, Stainton by Langworth John George Dring, a potato merchant, died on 3 March 1947, at 29 Rookwood Road in Nottingham. He had married in May 1901.

On Monday 28 October 1996, 88-year-old Vernon Dring, when driving a Saab, had a head-on collision with a Land Rover on the B1202 near Lissington, and was flown to Lincoln County Hospital, where he died on 29 October 1996.

== Career ==
Throughout the 1960s, Albarn worked freelance to finance environmental art projects, including "Interplay" at the ICA. Also at this time, a gallery was set up at 26 Kingly Street, which was run by a group of artists including Albarn and his wife, Hazel, who also exhibited her work there. In 1967 Malcolm McLaren presented his first public showing of work, which was based around an environmental installation. In the same year, Jeffrey Shaw and Tjebbe van Tijen presented Breathing, Airmatter, Soundform.

In 1967, Keith Albarn & Partners. Ltd was established to design and produce "modular structures and multi-media environments for festivals, exhibitions or private clients who want anything from weather-proof golf course shelters to a children's playhouse". In 1968, they contributed to the exhibition Cybernetic Serendipity at the ICA that was curated by Jasia Reichardt. Also in 1968, Ekistikit was launched at Margate's Dreamland Amusement Park in Kent via Spectrum, the first 'psychedelic' Fun Palace which had 20 different chambers where the participants were able to explore and stimulate their senses by awakening each room. The second Fun Palace was called Fifth Dimension and was presented at Girvan on the West coast of Scotland, and featured on Tomorrow's World and in their 1970 annual. Keith's Ekistikit system was flexible and was also used as furniture for the style-conscious of the seventies as well as for children's playgrounds. In 2002, a version of Ekistikit was presented as an exhibition by Unit with Jim Birdsell at the Spiral Gallery in Japan.

In the sixties, Keith Albarn was involved in presenting 'happenings', was a guest on Late Night Line-Up and briefly managed the band Soft Machine after travelling with them to the Côte d'Azur where his flat-pack Fun Palace was used as a gig venue.

Albarn began researching pattern in the 1970s after he formed Vertex, a group made up of Keith Albarn, Jenny Miall-Smith, Stanford Steele, and Dinah Walker, that worked on the research, design and construction for the first 'World of Islam festival' at the ICA in 1974 that later on became Islamathematica when displayed in Rotterdam. Vertex also worked on the exhibition "Illusion in Art and Science" that was shown at the ICA in 1976 and in New York in 1977 and which led to the book Illusion in Nature and Art by R. L. Gregory and E. H. Gombrich. He was co-author of The Language of Pattern in 1974 and Diagram: The Instrument of Thought in 1977.

From 1977 to 1981, he was course leader of fine art at North East London Polytechnic. From 1981 to 1997 he was the head of the Colchester School of Art, opened in 1885, which is based in the Colchester Institute. Whilst in Colchester, he helped set up Cuckoo Farm Studios and formed CADVAT (Colchester and District Visual Arts Forum) that later led to the development of Firstsite.

== Death ==
Albarn died of cancer on 23 July 2024, at the age of 85.

== Pattern and belief ==
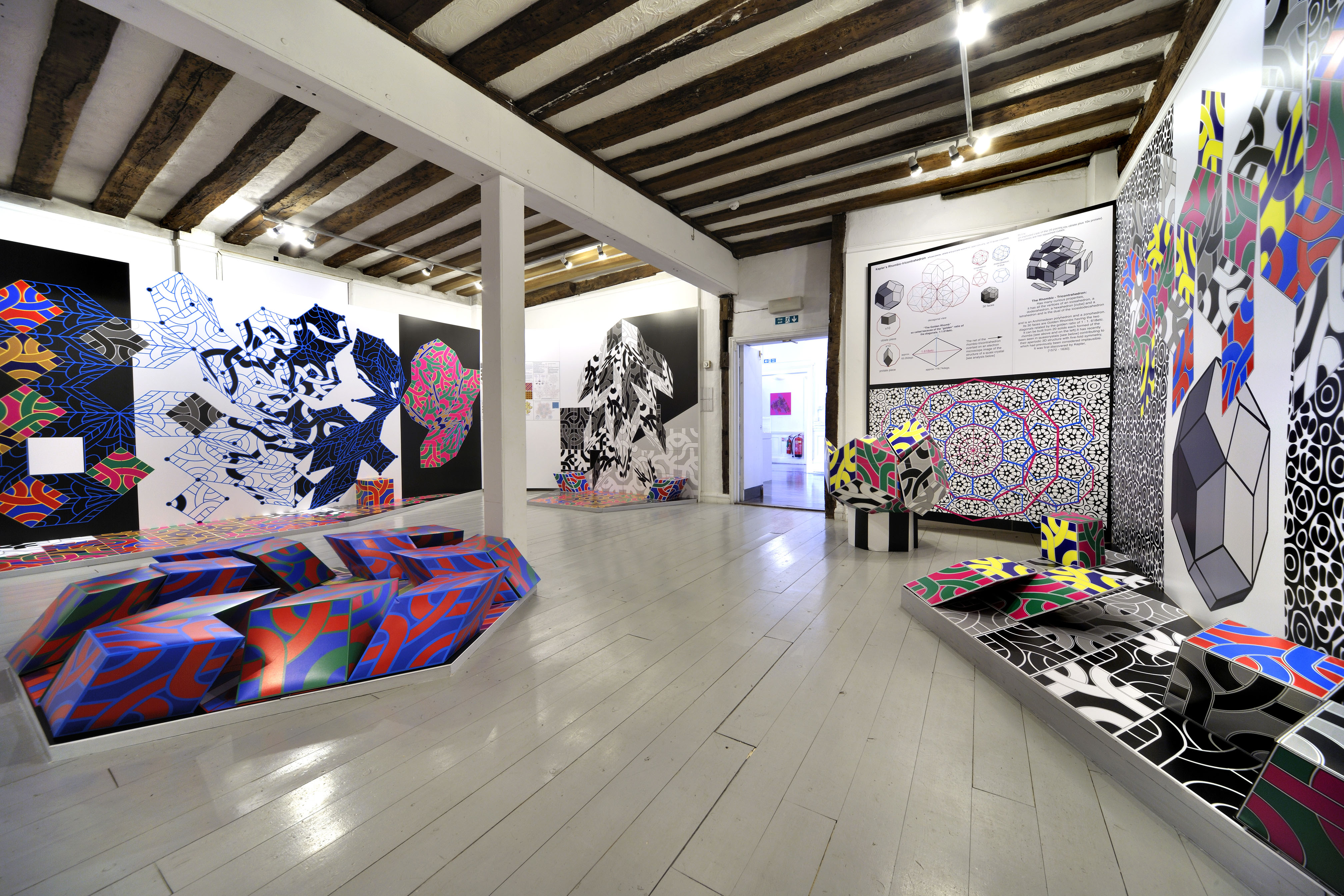
Installation view from Pattern and Belief, at The Minories Galleries

In 2013, The Minories Galleries presented a body of work that was developed from over forty years of research; a progression of patterns developed from a simple number game. It was on display from 18 May to 13 July 2013. For over forty years Keith Albarn had been researching number systems and patterns, and their relationship to belief systems and creativity. Taking a simple number game as a starting point he developed an infinite number of new patterns that connect across various dimensions allowing endless possibilities for outcomes. Some of these possibilities were displayed at The Minories Galleries through a patterned environment, prints, sculptural forms, artist's games and sound-works. As part of the exhibition a library and collection of material further explained this area of research.

One of the reviewers wrote that 'Albarn's vividly engaging artworks [were] a blend of intellect and intuition [...] pattern as both order and permeable vision'.
