= Bullington Priory =

Priory in Bullington, Lincolnshire, England

Coordinates: 53°16′32″N 0°21′04″W

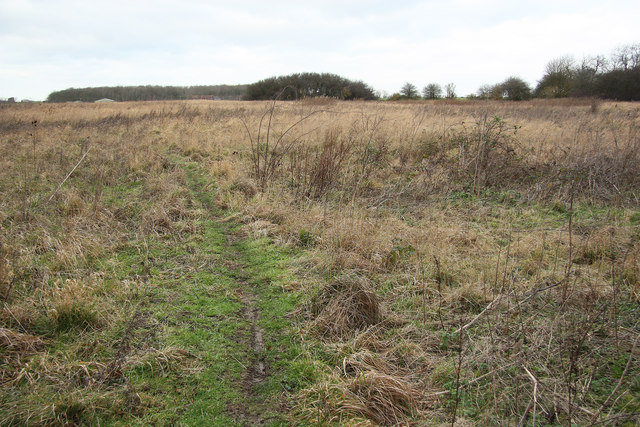
Site of Bullington Priory

Bullington Priory was a priory in Bullington, Lincolnshire, England.

The priory was a house of the Gilbertine Order and dedicated to Saint Mary. It was founded as a double house between 1148 and 1154 by Simon, son of William de Kyme, who gave part of his park for the site, along with wood and land, the churches of Bullington and Langton, and Hackthorn Mill. His son, Philip de Kyme, provided for seven canons with land in Faldingworth, the churches of Spridlington and Winthorpe, and a moiety of Friskney. For the nuns he gave 20 acres in Huttoft for the clothing of the convent and the church of St. Albinus at Spridlington. Alexander de Crevequer granted 52 acres in Hackthorn, and common of pasture for 500 sheep and the small priory his father had founded on the island of Tunstall . The numbers were limited by the statute of Saint Gilbert to 100 nuns and lay sisters, and 50 canons and lay brothers.

Throughout the thirteenth century the prior and convent continued to acquire both lands and churches.

After the black death the house suffered and by 1428 there were fewer than ten people in Bullington and Spridlington, and this caused the church at Spridlington to fall into ruin.

The house was surrendered in 1538 by the Prior, Prioress, nine canons and fourteen nuns.

== Charters ==
A historically valuable series of charters survive, known as the Bullington Series, these are mainly in the Harleian and Cottonian collections at the British Library.
