= St George's Church, Goltho =

Coordinates: 53.2828°N 0.3272°W

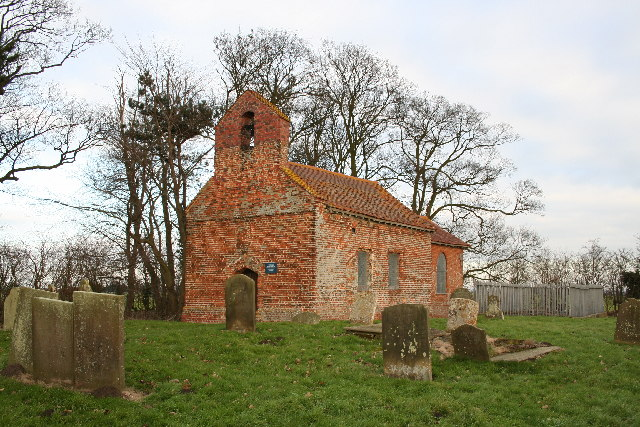
- St George's Church, Goltho, from the southwest

- Location in Lincolnshire
- OS grid reference: TF 116 775
- Location: Goltho, Lincolnshire
- Country: England
- Denomination: Anglican
- Website: Churches Conservation Trust

History
- Dedication: Saint George

Architecture
- Functional status: Redundant
- Heritage designation: Grade II*
- Designated: 30 November 1966
- Architectural type: Church
- Style: Gothic
- Groundbreaking: c. 1530

Specifications
- Materials: Brick, tiled roof

St George's Church is a redundant Anglican church in the deserted village of Goltho, Lincolnshire, England. It is recorded in the National Heritage List for England as a designated Grade II* listed building, and under the care of the Churches Conservation Trust. The church is in a field, and can be approached only by footpaths to the south of the A158 road, 2 miles (3 km) southwest of Wragby, and 11 miles (18 km) northeast of Lincoln. The church was the last evidence surviving above ground of the deserted medieval village and manorial holding dating from the ninth century on the site of a Romano-British settlement. The church was severely fire damaged in 2013.

== History ==
The nave of the present church was rebuilt in about 1530 by the Grantham family of Goltho Hall (now demolished), and the chancel was added in about 1600. Alterations and additions were made in the early 18th century and in the late 19th century.

The church was gutted by fire on 21 October 2013, leaving only the walls and bellcote standing, the most likely cause being a lightning strike. The Churches Conservation Trust does not insure its buildings and as of 2020 the church remains unrestored with access prohibited.

== Architecture ==
St George's was constructed in red brick, and had a tiled roof with wooden eaves. Its plan was simple, consisting of a nave with a bellcote at the west end, and a narrower, lower chancel. Entry to the church was by the west door, above which was a blocked window. The bellcote had a single round-headed opening. On the north side of the church was a small opening high on the wall and, to the east, a large rectangular window. In the north wall of the chancel was a large window with a pointed head. At the east end was a blind oval window. The south wall of the chancel contained a single large pointed window, and there was a large rectangular window in the south wall of the nave. Immediately to the west of this window was part of the arch of a blocked doorway.

Inside the church, the walls were lime-washed white, and the fittings, mostly of poignant modesty, painted pale blue. There were niches in the north and south walls of the nave. Two 17th-century gravestones were incorporated into the floor of the nave. The fittings destroyed in the fires included a double-decker Georgian pulpit, a classical reredos from the Queen Anne period with curved entablature, box pews, balustrade altar rails in the Laudian style, and carved bench ends. There was a small gallery at the west end of the nave, probably for singers or musicians.

The small scale and endearing simplicity of the church as the last visible remnant of Goltho was illustrated by English artist John Piper in the collection Church Poems by British Poet Laureate John Betjeman.

== External features ==
The churchyard contains the war grave of a Royal Air Force officer of the First World War.

== See also ==
- List of churches preserved by the Churches Conservation Trust in the East of England
