= East Midlands Oil Province =

Onshore oilfield in England

Coordinates: 53°N 1°W

The East Midlands Oil Province, also known as the East Midlands Petroleum Province, covers the petroliferous geological area across the north-eastern part of the East Midlands of England that has a few small oil fields.

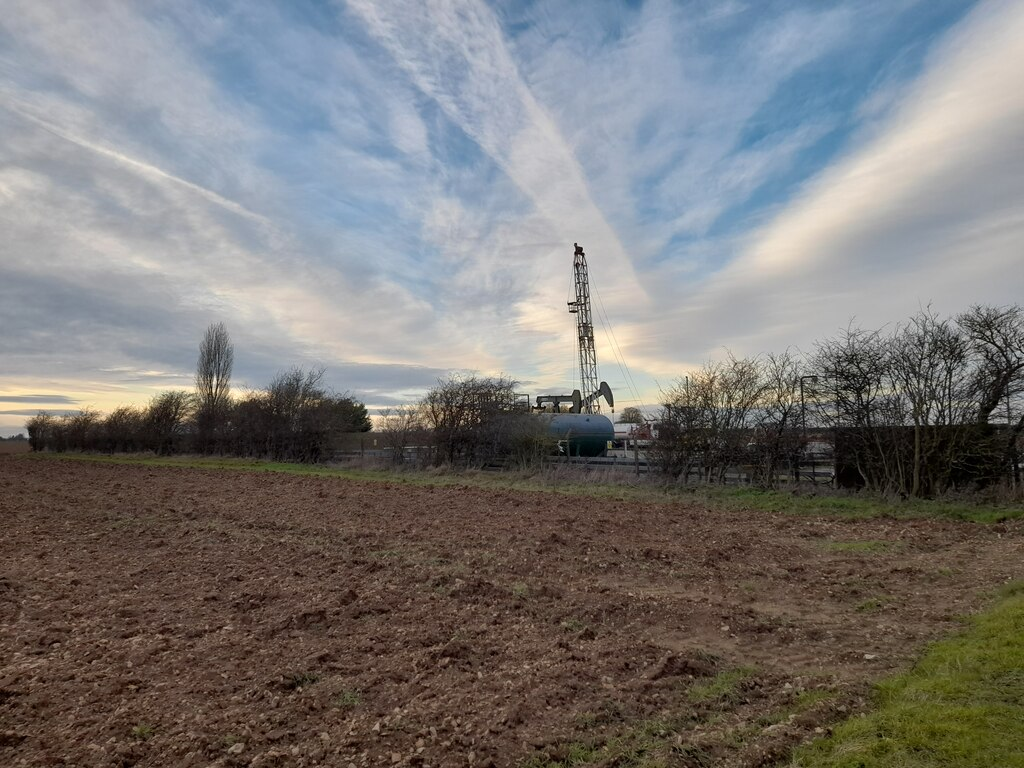
Welton field in January 2021

The largest field in the province is the Welton oil field, near Lincoln. It is the second largest onshore oil field in the UK.

== Geography ==
It comprises Derbyshire, Lincolnshire, North Lincolnshire, Nottinghamshire and northern Leicestershire.

== History ==
=== UK oil production ===
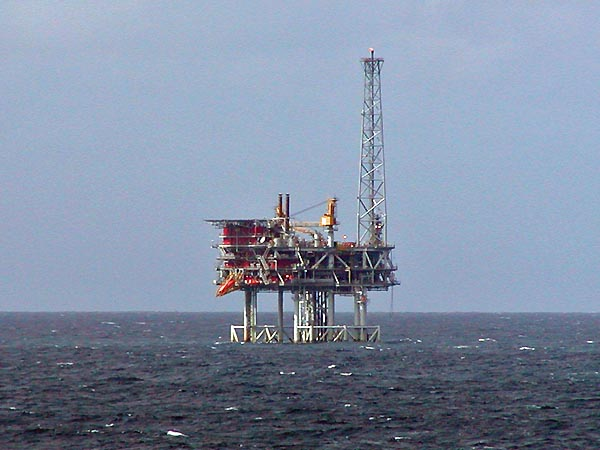
North Sea oil was on stream from 1975 and has high production costs; the first oil from the North Sea was on Wednesday 11 June 1975 from the Argyll oil field into the tanker Theogennitor

The UK's first oil field was discovered in the East Midlands, at Hardstoft in east Derbyshire in 1919. Prior to this, from 1851, oil shale in the Midland Valley in Scotland was used, until 1962. With North Sea oil, Britain became self-sufficient with oil and became a net exporter of oil in 1981, with exports peaking in 1985 and production peaking in 1999. The UK became a net exporter of gas in 1997, and a net importer of oil in 2004. UK consumption of petroleum increases each year. Per capita consumption of oil annually is about 1.3 tonnes. The UK has the capacity to refine 92 million tonnes of crude oil a year.

Currently the North Sea is producing around 1.5 million barrels of oil a day. The peak was in 2000 at 4.5 million a day. The Brent oilfield is being decommissioned. The United Kingdom Continental Shelf has reserves of between 12 – 24 billion barrels. In 2014, around 14% of the UK's gas came from Russia via Ukraine.

=== Onshore oil ===
The highest production was September 1943, when 10,049 tons produced, or 335 tons per day. This record would be next exceeded in March 1963, when 10,478 tons, or 338 tons per day were produced.

In 1958, it produced 80,000 tons, with oil, in the 1950s, taken to Pumpherston in Scotland. For the north Nottinghamshire oil fields, and some in Leicestershire in the 1950s, oil was taken by road tanker to Tuxford North railway station, then by train to Uphall railway station in West Lothian. The closing of railway stations, in the 1960s, would consequently affect the transportation of oil.

In 1960 it produced 85,000 tons, and in 106,000 tons in 1961. In 1964 the East Midlands fields produced 127,491 tons, and in 1974, the East Midlands produced 80,000 tonnes.

But in 1979, the North Sea produced 76 million tonnes. If production was less than 250,000 tonnes per six months, no Petroleum Revenue Tax was applied.

By 1967 Dorset was producing 10,000 tons per year. Wytch Farm was discovered in 1973 by the Gas Council, on the Isle of Purbeck directly south of Poole, at 3,000 to 4,000 ft depth, with production from May 1979. But, importantly, only after further geophysical exploration in December 1977, did anyone realise how huge the oil field was, when drilling took place at 5,000 ft.

This discovery made companies look much more for onshore oil. But subsequently nothing was anything remotely as enormous as Wytch Farm. The oil, from Dorset, was taken by train to South Wales.

In 1980, UK onshore oilfields produced 240,000 tonnes of oil, mostly from Wytch Farm. This had doubled from the year before.

Until 1990, relatively little oil was produced by UK onshore oil industry. This rapidly increased to peak between 1991 and 1999, where around 5 million tonnes of oil was produced each year – 5.4 million tonnes, the most, was produced in 1996. Since 1999 it has gradually declined to around 1 million tonnes a year. Onshore UK natural gas peaked in 2001. Cumulatively, onshore oil production has produced around 2% (around 500,000,000 barrels (79,000,000 m^{3})) of offshore (North Sea) production. The Wytch Farm oil field in Dorset, the largest onshore oilfield in Europe and run by BP, has reserves on its own of around 500,000,000 barrels (79,000,000 m^{3}) of oil. The East Midlands Province provides 11% of UK onshore oil, 65% of the total excluding Wytch farm. So far, the Province has provided around 6 million tonnes of oil. In total, the UK has around 15 million tonnes of onshore oil left.

Planning permission for drilling was much quicker in Lincolnshire than in Hampshire and Dorset.

Although onshore oil reserves are much less, it costs much less to find and develop onshore oil. Depleted onshore oilfields at Gainsborough and Welton will be used for gas storage, of which the UK has little allocated reserves. The UK has reserves of 12 days of gas, compared to 91 days in France and 77 days in Germany.

=== Discoveries ===
Oil was discovered at Kelham Hills in the 1920s.

In June 1939, BP (then the D'Arcy Exploration Company) discovered oil at Eakring; although this was not announced until September 1944. During the war the field produced over 300,000 tons of oil or 2,250,000 barrels from 170 pumps. Oil was also drilled for during the war at Caunton and Kelham Hills.

Oil was discovered at Plungar in 1953 by BP. This was followed by three more discoveries in Lincolnshire, and three more discoveries in Nottinghamshire. But development drilling stopped abruptly in 1965 as it was not economic, and North Sea Gas was unexpectedly discovered. Exploration drilling began again in 1973, when the oil price rose significantly.

It was a discovery of oil between Scothern and Sudbrooke in September 1980 that led to the Welton field being discovered. More drilling was conducted in Welton in 1981, and the French company CGG conducted seismic surveys.

BP drilled near Doddington in November 1980.

Eakring was only abandoned in 1986, after producing 7MMbbl. Eakring had secondary recovery, with compressed water from the end of the war. By the end of war Eakring production had dropped to 20,000 tons per year.

=== Welton Gathering Centre ===
This is actually at Reepham near Sudbrooke on railway, and opened on 21 May 1986 by Alick Buchanan-Smith, the Energy minister. Production began at 600 barrels (95 m^{3}) of oil per day, rising to 3,000. The Centre is the home of Star Energy (East Midlands) Ltd on Barfield Lane. In the early 1990s, a 1,000 tonnes of oil was taken on a train to Immingham every other day. When building the centre, BP discovered a 15-foot (4.6 m) plesiosaurus which was displayed in Scunthorpe Natural History Museum.

=== Oil companies ===
In February 1976, Tony Benn, the Secretary of State for Energy, gave permission for British Gas, BP Petroleum Development and Candecca Resources (on the Unlisted Securities Market, mostly owned by Sceptre Resources of Canada, originally called Decca Resources) to drill in the area.

Candecca bought Cambrian Exploration in January 1980, which gave it joint ownership of the Humbly Grove field in Hampshire. In February 1982 Esso bought Candecca. Trafalgar House bought Candecca in January 1984 for £79 million. BP bought Candecca in July 1987 for £21 million from Trafalgar House. Candecca Resources Ltd was a subsidiary of BP. It was bought by Kelt UK Ltd in April 1992. Kelt UK Ltd was a subsidiary of Kelt Energy plc and Edinburgh Oil and Gas plc.

Most of the oilfield licences were owned by BP Exploration, when they were bought by Pentex Oil of Aberdeen in March 1989. Star Energy bought Pentex Oil in August 2005 for £38.5 million.

== Geology ==
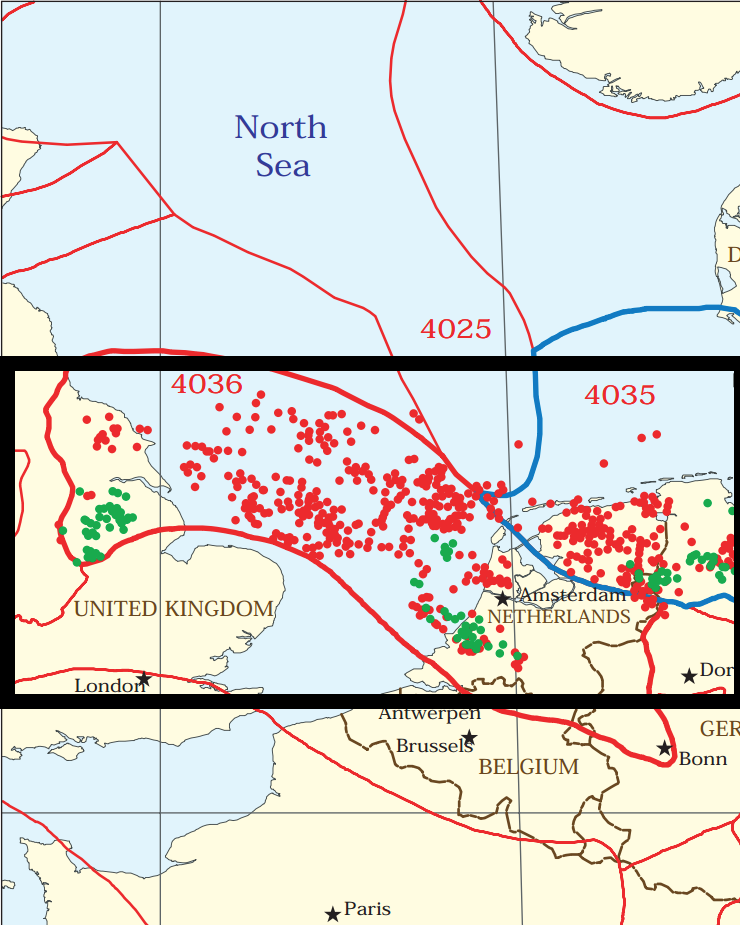
Southern North Sea Basin

The Province comprises a major series of Carboniferous rift basins. Oil is found in Silesian sandstones and fractured Dinantian limestones.

It is part of the Southern North Sea Basin.

== Welton oil fields ==
Most oil is transported by road tanker. It is the main part of the East Midlands Province oilfield, where thirty three oil fields have been discovered, including areas outside of Lincolnshire. Oil had been discovered by BP at Corringham in May 1958, at 4,400 ft, with a small blowout covering a nearby field. Oil was found at Gainsborough in 1960, Glentworth in 1961, and Torksey in 1962. Oil was also found in Nocton in the 1960s.

Parish councils around Welton, such as Scothern, often complained about noise and smoke.

=== East Glentworth ===
Found near the A15 and B1398, just south-west of Caenby Corner and near the (now exhausted) Glentworth Oilfield at Glentworth. Discovered in March 1987 by BP, with production starting in February 1993. Formerly owned by Pentex Oil UK Ltd and now owned by Star Energy. Taken by road tanker to Gainsborough.

=== Beckering ===
British Gas found oil in January 1990 at 5,000ft, producing around 120 barrels per day.

=== Scampton North ===
Scampton B was discovered in October 1985 by BP with production starting in February 1989. It produced around 250 barrels per day. Owned by Star Energy (East Midlands) Ltd and originally run by Candecca. Transported by road tanker to the Welton Gathering Centre at Reepham. The original Scampton A Oilfield ceased production in 1988.

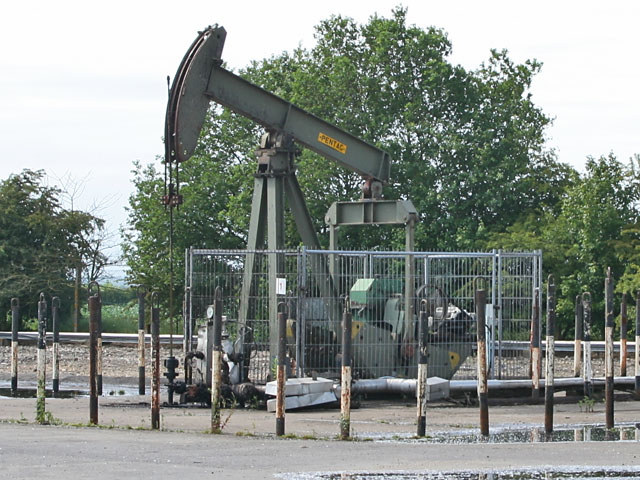
Stainton production

=== Cold Hanworth ===
Discovered in September 1997 by Candecca, with production starting in September 1998 at Cold Hanworth. Owned by Star Energy (East Midlands) Ltd, although originally run by Candecca. Transported by road tanker to the Welton Gathering Centre, which is just south of the oil field at Reepham.

=== Stainton ===
Just north-east of Welton at Stainton by Langworth. Discovered by BP in July 1984, with production starting June 1987. Permission for producing oil was given in June 1986. It produced around 250 barrels per day. Owned by Star Energy (East Midlands) Ltd. Originally run by Candecca. Situated on the Lincoln-Market Rasen (Newark – Grimsby) railway line and taken by road to the Welton rail terminal at Reepham.

=== Fiskerton Airfield ===
Discovered in November 1997 by Cirque with production starting in August 1998 on the former RAF Fiskerton. It is owned 48% by Cirque Energy (UK) Ltd, 32% by Altaquest Energy Corp (UK) Ltd, 18% by Courage Energy UK Ltd and 2% by Mermaid Resources (UK) Ltd. Run by Cirque Energy. Pipeline to the Welton Gathering Centre.

=== Welton ===
Largest of the fields, with about 2 million tonnes of initial oil reserves at Welton. Discovered in February 1981 by BP with production starting in November 1984. It would produce around 3,000 barrels per day.

Owned by Star Energy (East Midlands) Ltd. Originally run by Candecca and BP. Transported by rail. It is the second largest onshore oilfield in the UK after Wytch Farm in Dorset. The next largest is Stockbridge, Hampshire, run by Star Energy. It is even bigger than Eakring, which kept the UK going in World War Two. It is very much larger than all the other onshore fields. It has a predicted total production of 16,740,000 bbl (2,661,000 m^{3}).

On Tuesday 3 May 1994 an oil blow out took place near Scothern. The primary school was 200 metres from the site, with children being sprayed with oil in the lunchtime. Candecca paid out compensation.

=== Nettleham ===
BP drilled in the Greetwell Lane area in September 1981. Discovered in March 1983 by BP with production starting in October 1985. Owned by Star Energy (East Midlands) Ltd, although originally run by BP and Candecca. Oil transported by pipeline to the Welton Gathering Centre.

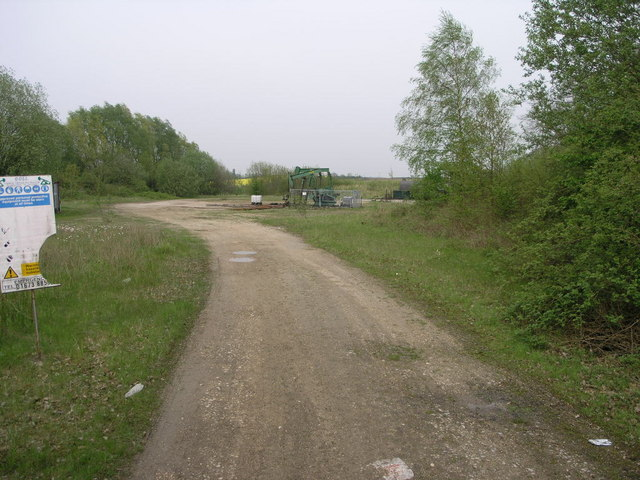
Farley's Wood production

=== Keddington ===
Next door and north-east of Louth on the River Lud at Keddington. Discovered in January 1998 by Candecca, with production beginning in September 1998. Formerly owned 65% by ROC Oil (UK) Ltd and 35% by ROC Oil (CEL) Ltd. Bought in March 2007 by Egdon Resources for £250,000 with the two wells closed. Egdon restarted production in April 2007 and producing about 50 barrels (7.9 m^{3}) a day. Up to February 2009, produced 192,000 barrels (30,500 m^{3}) of oil. Estimated to be 4,000,000 barrels (640,000 m^{3}) of oil. Taken by road tanker to the Welton Gathering Centre.

=== Farley's Wood (Nottinghamshire) ===
Owned by Onshore Production Services Ltd (OPS) or OOSL. Discovered in March 1983, production started July 1985, road tanker to Welton. Originally owned by EMOG. Situated in between Walesby and Tuxford.

=== Egmanton (Nottinghamshire) ===
The field was developed by BP Petroleum Development. Production started in July 1955 and production peaked in 1958.

== Gainsborough based fields ==
None of these fields are in Lincolnshire, but oil from the petroleum play is collected at Gainsborough. The area around Gainsborough known as the Gainsborough Trough.

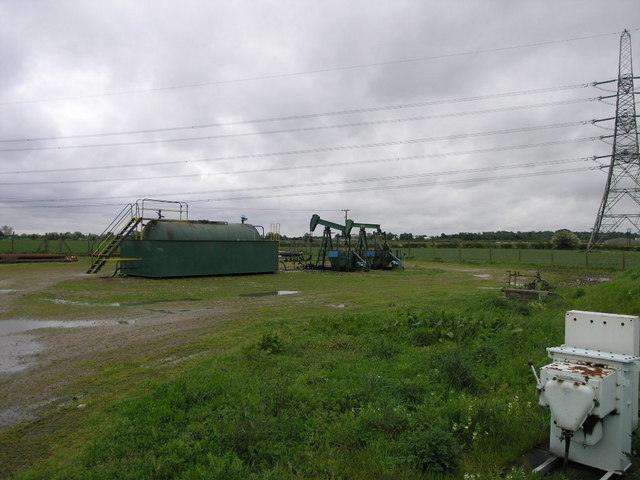
Production infrastructure near Old Trent Road about midway between Beckingham and Gainsbourgh

=== Beckingham West (Nottinghamshire) ===
Discovered in July 1985 by BP with production starting in October 1987. Formerly owned by Pentex Oil UK Ltd. Oil transported by pipeline to Gainsborough. The field is operated by IGas Energy which acquired Star Energy in 2011. Situated just off the A631 at Beckingham. Known also as the Gainsborough-Beckingham oil field. Production is near the Beckingham Marshes' RSPB nature reserve with daily production of 300 barrels of crude oil and 1 million cubic feet of natural gas. The gas is piped to a nearby power plant. The wells in the field were fracked using lower fluid volumes than used for Shale techniques. This method is similar to, but with lower volumes than hydraulic fracturing for the extraction of shale gas.

=== Kirklington (Nottinghamshire) ===
Situated just south of Eakring towards Newark on the A617 at Kirklington. Owned by Star Energy Oil & Gas Limited 75% and Star Energy Oil UK Limited 25%. Formerly owned by Pentex. Discovered in December 1985 by BP with production starting March 1991. Taken by road tanker to Gainsborough.

=== Rempstone (Nottinghamshire) ===
Far south of Nottinghamshire at junction of A60 and A6006 at Rempstone in the far south of Nottinghamshire. Owned by Star Energy Oil & Gas Ltd 75% and Oil UK Ltd 25%. Discovered in December 1985 by Pentex, with production started June 1991. Formerly owned by Pentex. Road tanker to Gainsborough. Operated by Star.

=== Long Clawson (Leicestershire) ===
Owned by Star Energy Oil & Gas Ltd 75% and Star Energy Oil UK Ltd 25%. Discovered in March 1986, with production started December 1990. Originally owned by Pentex. Road tanker to Gainsborough. Situated on Clawson Hill at Long Clawson.

== Other independent oil fields ==
These are not run by Star Energy and oil is usually tankered direct to ConocoPhillips' Humber Refinery in South Killingholme near Immingham in North Lincolnshire.

=== Whisby ===
Discovered in January 1985 by BP with production starting in May 1990 at Whisby Moor near North Hykeham. Was owned and ran by Blackland Park Exploration Ltd, although originally ran by EMOG (East Midlands Oil & Gas – a UK division of Fortune Oil). The Whisby 4 and now the Whisby 5 wells are the currently producing wells and have now cumulatively more than doubled all historical production. Oil was transported by road tanker to Immingham.

Industrial hazardous waste has been pumped into the former site.

=== West Firsby ===
Discovered in January 1988 by Enterprise Oil (former oil division of British Gas plc) being found at 6,000 ft, with production starting in August 1991 at West Firsby north of Lincoln, just west of Spridlington. Owned 53% by Tullow Oil and 47% by Edinburgh Oil & Gas plc. Originally ran by Tullow Oil and Enterprise Oil, now ran by Europa since May 2003. Taken by road tanker to Immingham's ConocoPhillips Humber Refinery. Sourced by early Namurian pro-deltaic shales. Found on a Variscan inversion anticline on a boundary fault of the Dinatian-Namurian Gainsborough Trough.

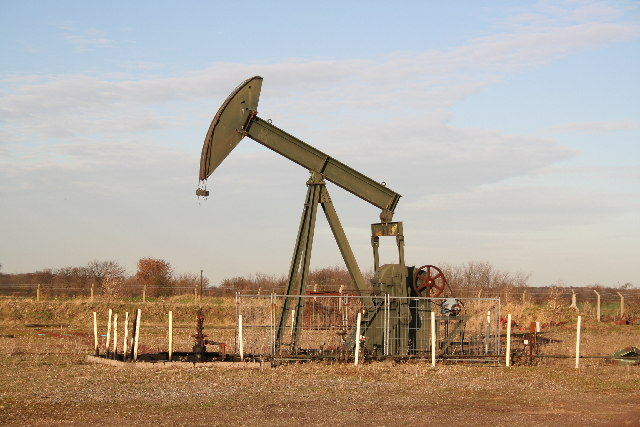
Newton-on-Trent production

=== Crosby Warren ===
It was discovered in May 1986 by RTZ (Rio Tinto Group), with production starting in October 1987. Just north-east of Scunthorpe, near the junction of the A1077 and A1029, just north of the Corus steel works. Just south of a Romano-British settlement. Originally run by Edinburgh Oil & Gas, then bought by Europa Oil & Gas on 30 November 2006. Oil is transported by road tanker.

=== Newton on Trent ===
Discovered in April 1998 by AltaQuest with production starting in September 1998. Owned by Courage Energy (UK) Ltd and ran by AltaQuest. Oil is taken by road tanker to the ConocoPhillips Humber refinery in Immingham. Production ended in July 2000. Run by Blackland, and previously owned by Floyd Energy. Situated just south of the village.

== Future oil fields ==
Possible production may take place at Broughton and Brigg in North Lincolnshire.
