= Greetwell =

Greetwell may refer to one of two settlements in the English county of Lincolnshire:

- Greetwell, North Lincolnshire
- Greetwell, West Lindsey
