= Cold Hanworth medieval settlement =

- Location within Lincolnshire
- 53°20′7″N 0°26′45″W
- Location: Cold Hanworth, Lincolnshire
- OS grid reference: TF 036 831

Scheduled monument
- Designated: 7 July 1999
- Reference no.: 1016796

Cold Hanworth medieval settlement is a deserted medieval village in Lincolnshire, England, next to the village of Cold Hanworth and about 7 miles (11 km) north of Lincoln. It is a Scheduled Monument.

== History ==
The village was recorded in the Domesday Book of 1086. It was in decline from the mid 14th century. In the 17th century parts had been enclosed for pasture, and by the 18th century it was mostly depopulated.

== Earthworks ==
The remains of the medieval village are immediately south and east of All Saints Church (a 19th-century building on the site of a medieval church). The remains of the main street of the village runs south of the church, where there is a modern pond; it curves eastwards for about 150 metres (490 ft), and turns northwards to the edge of the modern field. The remains of houses and outbuildings survive as rectangular ditched enclosures along both sides of the main street.

Immediately west of the church are further traces of the medieval settlement, overlain by post-medieval remains: there are traces here of a north–south street, which was the northern route to the settlement.

To the west and east of the earthworks can be seen the ridge and furrow pattern, of the open-field system of medieval cultivation, surviving to a height of up to 0.3 metres (1 ft 0 in).

== See also ==
- List of lost settlements in the United Kingdom
