= Thomas and William Lumby =

English master carpenters

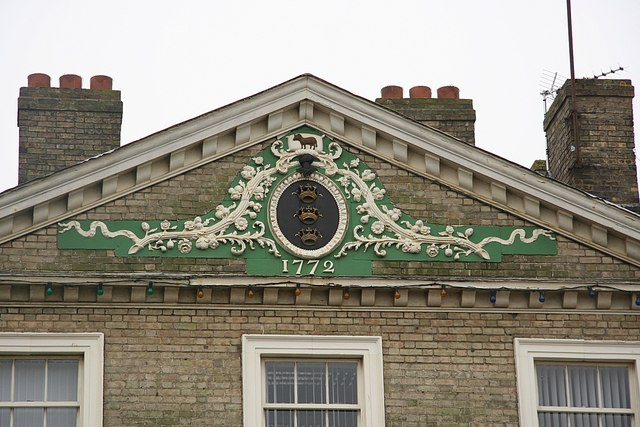
- Boston Corporation Arms on the Exchange Building, Boston. 1772
- Occupation: Architect
- Buildings: Boston Exchange Building. Lincolnshire County Hospital, Lincoln Castle Gaol and the Lincoln Bluecoat school.
- Projects: Work for the Earl of Exeter in Stamford

Thomas Lumby and William Lumby (c. 1755-1804) were master carpenters and architects working in Lincoln in the latter part of the 18th century. Thomas Lumby was the father of William. As they worked together and there is some confusion as which buildings each of them designed, they have been grouped together. It seems likely that after 1784, William Lumby had taken the business over from his father. Thomas Lumby undertook work at a number of major houses in Lincolnshire including Doddington Hall and Burghley House as well as building Caenby Hall and Corporation House (now the Exchange at Boston, Lincolnshire.

== Careers ==
Thomas Lumby was highly recommended in 1775 by James Essex to the Bishop of Lincoln for his work, but in the same year he was declared bankrupt. In 1776-9 Thomas and William Lumby were working closely with Essex on the re-fitting of the interior of the Cathedral including woodwork and the re-positioning of the altar rails. By 1781 Thomas Lumby appears to have moved to Stamford, where he was acting as architect and surveyor for the 9th Earl of Exeter. In 1793, William Lumby succeeded William Jepson the Clerk to fabric and surveyor of Cathedral following Jepson's death. By this time Lumby was working closely with Edward James Willson, who provides much information about Lumby. Lumby probably trained Willson as an architect and Willson succeeded Lumby as the Clerk to the fabric of the Cathedral. Willson recounts that William Lumby was of a very ingenious turn of mind, mild and gentle. He died at Greatford near Stamford on 18 August 1804, before the age of 50, after falling into a low and nervous state of health, which almost rendered him incapable of attending to business. William Lumby provided drawings for Richard Gough for the revision of the Lincoln section of Camden's Britannia which was published in 1806. These include a survey of Lincoln Castle with detailed drawings the West Gate and the barbican to the East Gate, which was demolished shortly afterwards. Also a plan of the grave slabs in the Cathedral before the floor was repaved and detailed drawings of the Roman aqueduct to the North East of Lincoln. Lumby also drew the plan and elevations of the Lincoln Cathedral which were published by the Society of Antiquaries in Vetusta Monumenta in 1791.

=== Work by Thomas Lumby ===
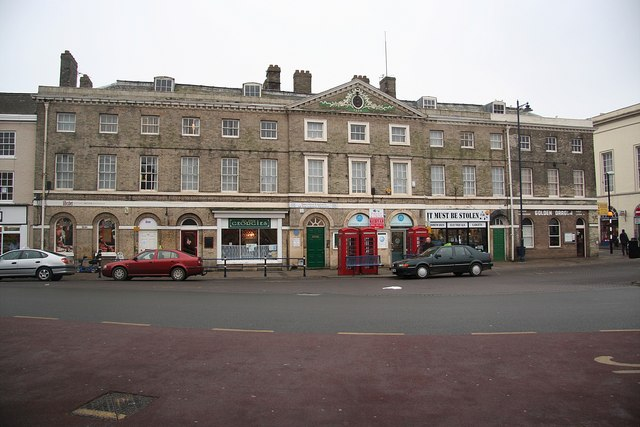
Boston Exchange, Lincolnshire, 1770-4

- Doddington Hall 1761-2. Internal alterations for Sir John Hussey Deveral, including a new staircase, and refitting the principal rooms.
- Caenby Hall 1763-4. Built for Lawrence Monck. Late Georgian. two storeys, parapet and hipped roof. Six bays with Now demolished, c.1775.
- The Exchange, formerly Market House, Market Place, Boston, Lincolnshire, 1770-4.
- Work at Stamford and Burghley House for the Earl of Exeter. Included terraces of houses in Ironmonger Row and in 1781 the connection to the Grand Staircase at Burghley House.

=== Work by either Thomas or William Lumby ===
Redbourne Church

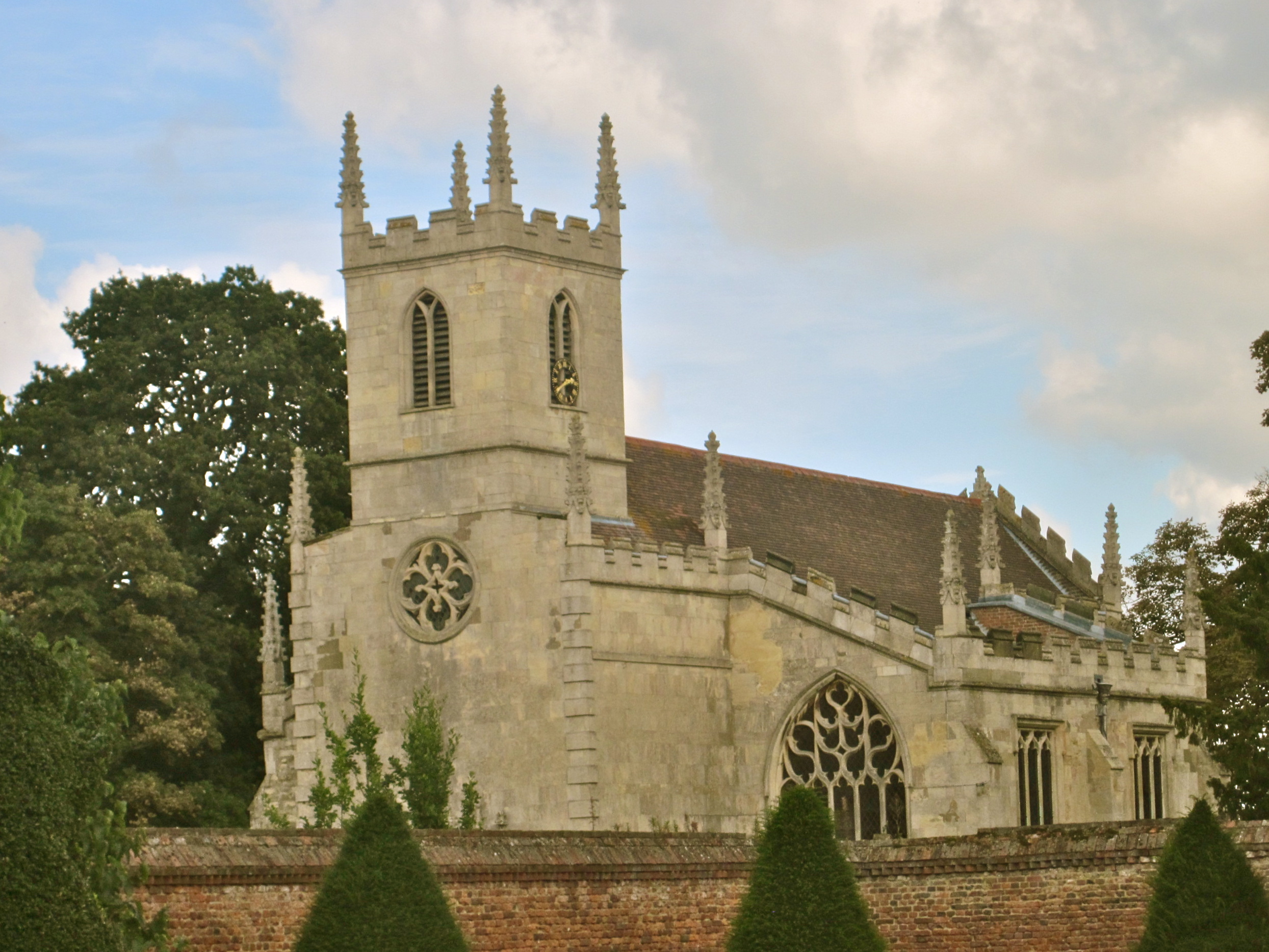
Doddington Church

- Redbourne Church, Lincolnshire. Rebuilt in a Gothic Style 1772-4. Although the church has 14th- and 15th-century origins, the bulk of the existing building is 18th-century and represents a Georgian Gothic style, using a mixture of squared and coursed rubble limestone with ashlar dressings. Its square tower is approximately 90 feet (27 m) high and the upper two storeys of the tower were added in 1788. The alterations of 1772–1774 in the gothic style by Thomas and Henry Lumby, and the chapel on the south side of the chancel served as a mausoleum for the family of the Dukes of St Albans.
- Doddington Church, near Lincoln. Rebuilt 1770-5. A Remarkable early example of a Gothic Revival Church. The detailing of the entrance door is more in the style of Strawberry Hill Gothic with lushly foliated crocheted and ogee decorated gables. The two west end windows are an interesting adaptation of the Lincolnshire flamboyant tracery of the decorated period of Church architecture.

=== Attributed to Thomas or William Lumby ===
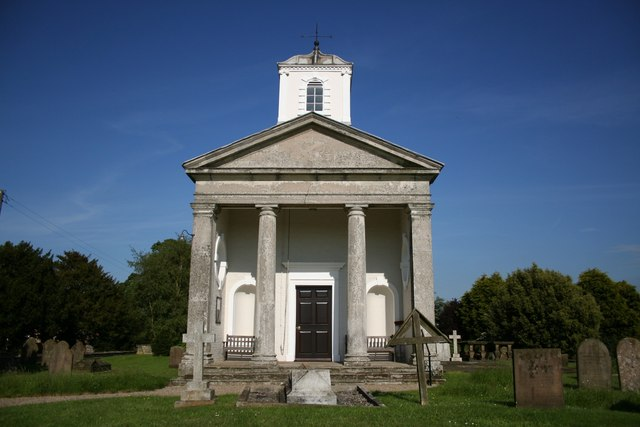
St.Helen's portico

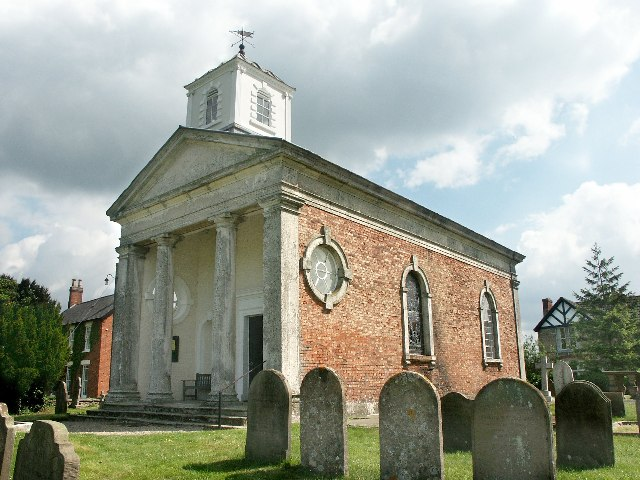
St Helen, Saxby

- St Helen's Church Saxby (nr Spridlington, N.of Lincoln), 1775. Parish Church and mortuary chapel for the Earls of Scarborough. Red brick with stone dressings, rendered, timber, lead roofs. In form of small classical temple; rectangular on plan, with a pedimented portico in antis with Tuscan columns across the western front, which is surmounted by surmounted by a classical bellcote.apsidal east end. The western portico is reached up three steps and has Tuscan pillars supporting a plain frieze and pediment. The side walls of the portico are lit by glazed circular windows with raised keystones. The church had been attributed to Carr of York (who constructed the nearby Norton Place) but no evidence to prove this has been found. It has been assumed that the Lumbys, who often worked with Carr, might have been the architects.

== Work by William Lumby ==
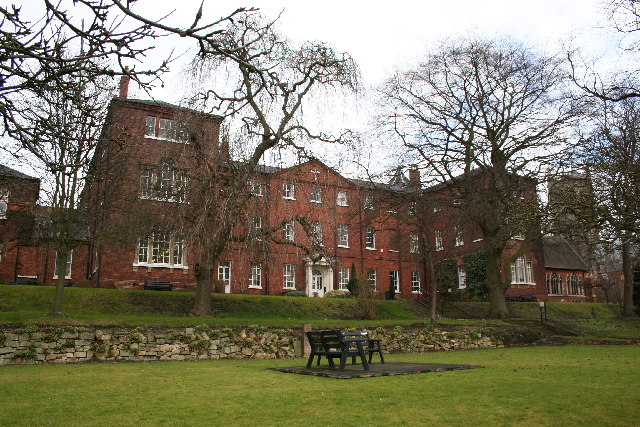
Former County Hospital now Chad Varah House

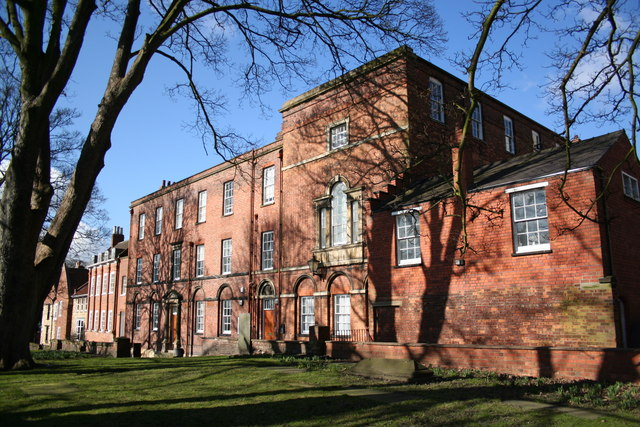
Bluecoat School - geograph.org.uk - 134111

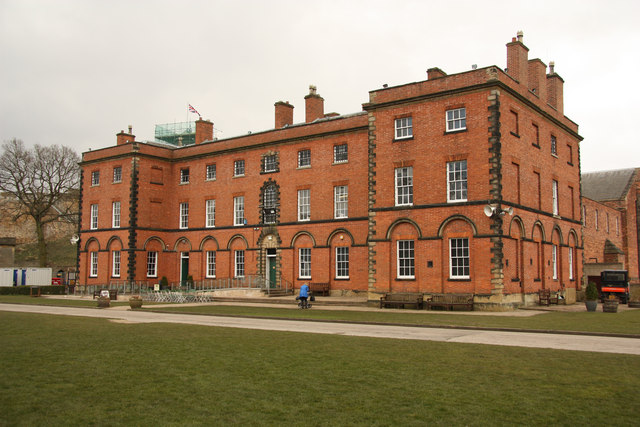
Old Gaol, Lincoln Castle

- The County Hospital, later Theological College, Wordsworth Street, 1776-7. Plans prepared by John Carr of York, but work superintended by William Lumby
- The Bluecoat School, Christ's Hospital Terrace, Lincoln. 1784-5. Brick with stone dressings and slate roof. Facing the road, the south side is a symmetrical block, three storeys high with five bays, with square ground floor windows set in a blind arcade with round arched stone heads - this arrangement is similar to Lumby's work at Lincoln Prison. Central Doric door case with pediment, six panel door and overlight. To right a block with a recessed single bay with a glazing bar sash set in a former doorway, with a bronze plaque in the tympanum inscribed Founded by Richard Smith MD June 1st 1612. The interior has a cantilevered stone staircase with cast-iron balustrade. The Bluecoat School was a charity school for boys, and closed in 1883, now Lincoln College of Art
- County Gaol at Lincoln Castle (1786-8)
- The Residence and probably the four brick houses of the Vicars Choral at Southwell

- House opposite St Mary's Church, Lincoln, designed for Alderman Gibbeson
- Warehouses at Grimsby, before 1799 for George Tennyson

== Gallery of work by Thomas and William Lumby ==
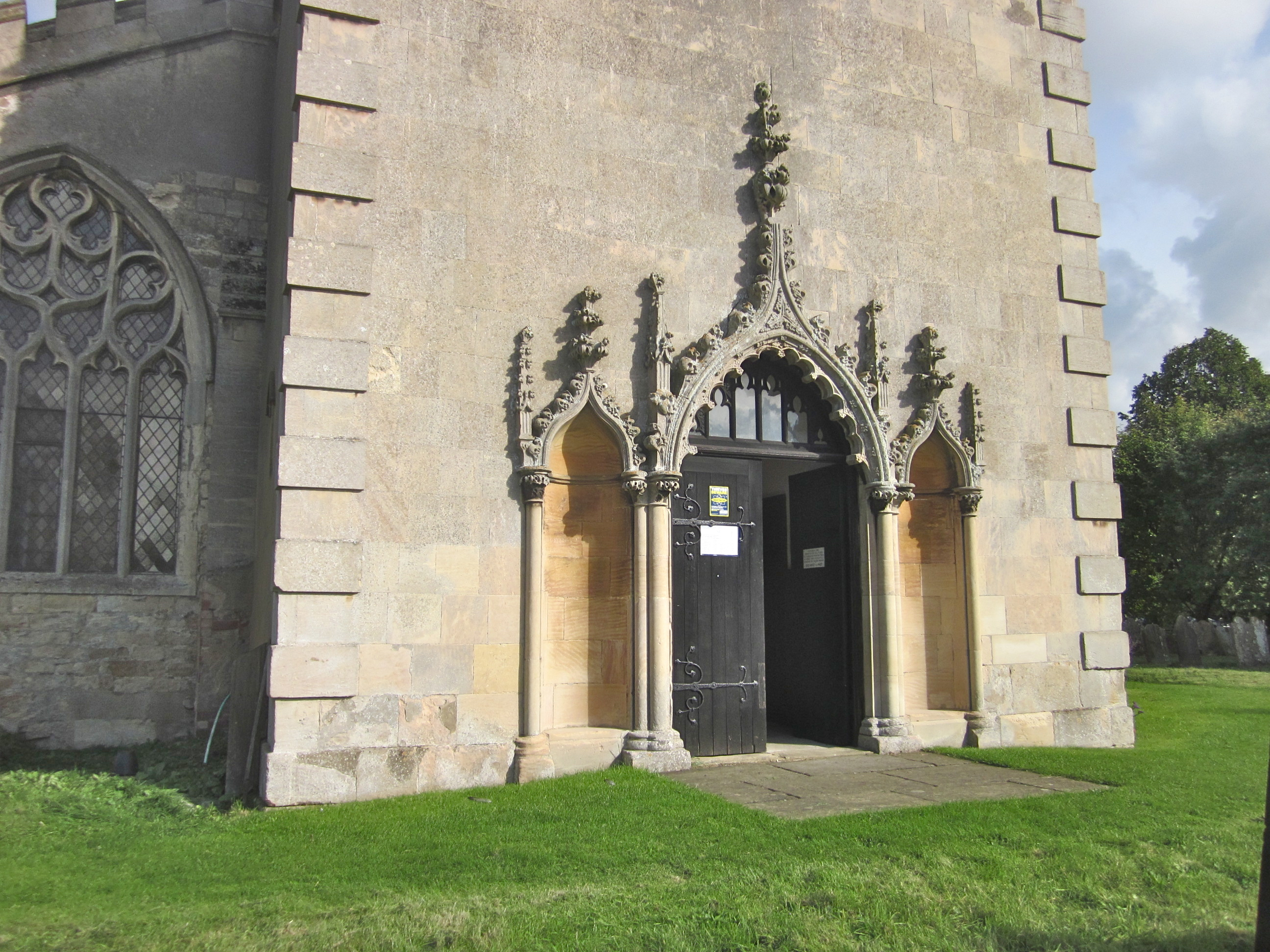
Doddington Church

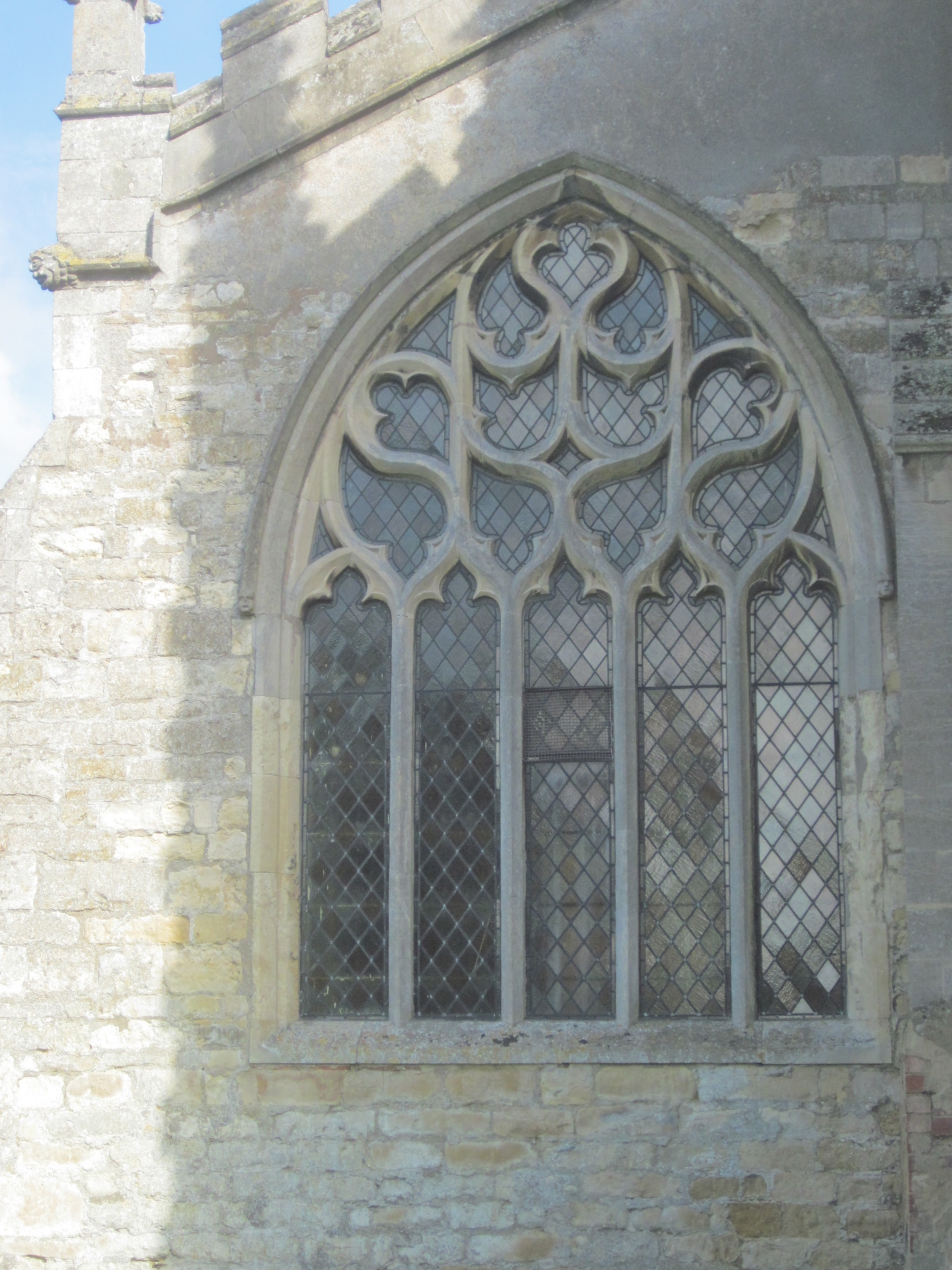
Doddington Church

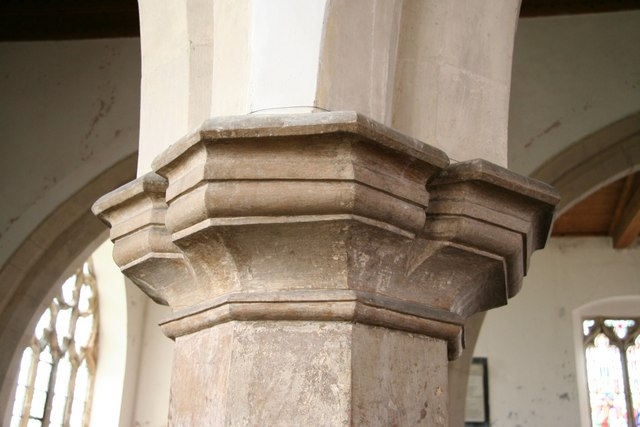
Gothic capital, St Peter's Church Doddington

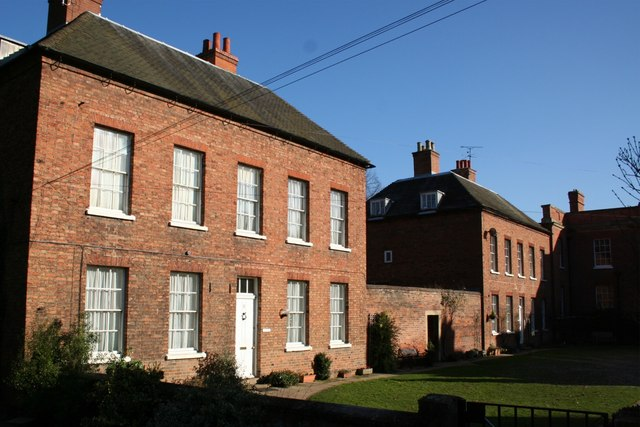
Vicars' Court Southwell

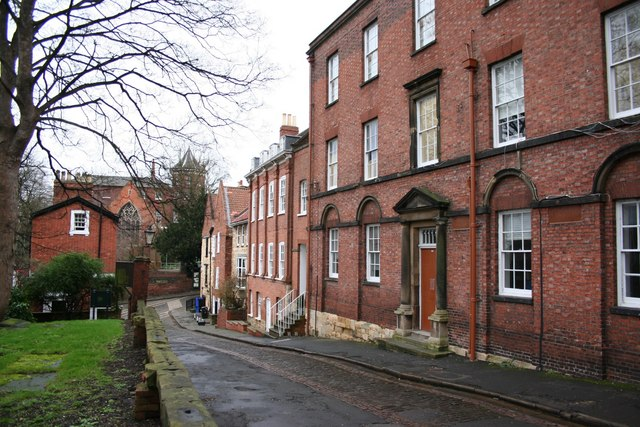
Old Bluecoat School and Christ's Hospital Terrace

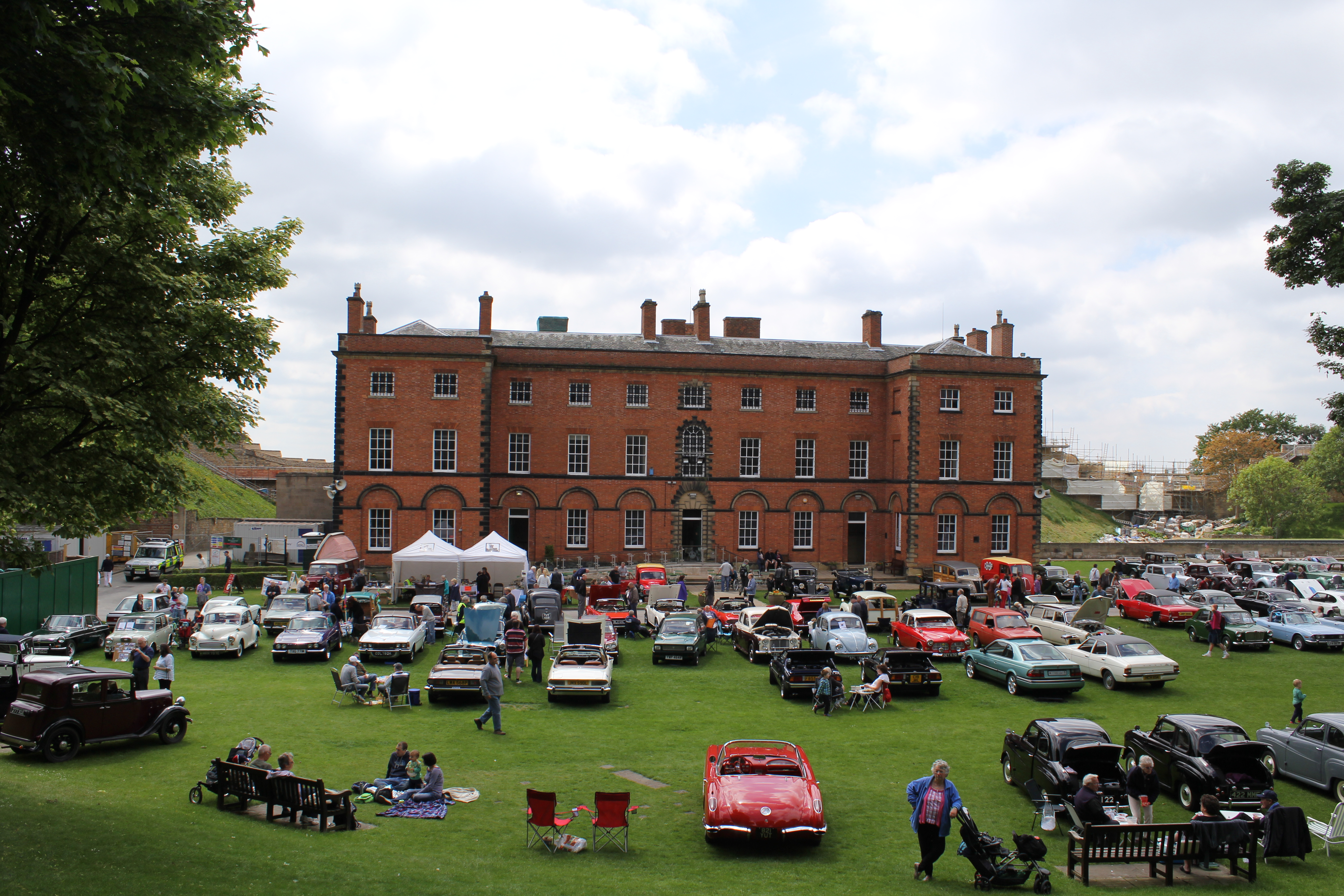
Gaol at Lincoln Castle

== Literature ==
- Antram N (revised), Pevsner N & Harris J, (1989), The Buildings of England: Lincolnshire, Yale University Press.
- Colvin H. A (1995), Biographical Dictionary of British Architects 1600-1840. Yale University Press, 3rd edition London, pp. 627–28.
