= Nettleham =

Village in Lincolnshire, England

Coordinates: 53.266167°N 0.487741°W

- Village and Civil Parish
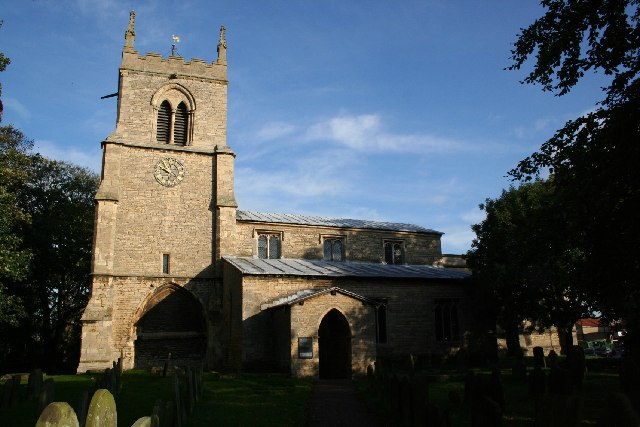
- All Saints' Church

- Location within Lincolnshire
- Population: 4,128 (2021 Census)
- OS grid reference: TF008754
  - London: 120 mi (190 km) S
- District: West Lindsey
- Shire county: Lincolnshire
- Region: East Midlands
- Country: England
- Sovereign state: United Kingdom
- Post town: LINCOLN
- Postcode district: LN2
- Dialling code: 01522 & 01673
- Police: Lincolnshire
- Fire: Lincolnshire
- Ambulance: East Midlands
- UK Parliament: Gainsborough

Nettleham is a village and civil parish within the West Lindsey district of Lincolnshire, England, 4 miles (6.4 km) north-east of Lincoln between the A46 and A158.

== History ==
The now-demolished Bishop's Manor House at Nettleham was the property of Edith of Wessex, wife of Edward the Confessor and later Empress Matilda, daughter of King Henry I, before passing into the possession of the Bishops of Lincoln, who enlarged it to create a Bishop's Palace appropriate to one of the country's most important Sees. On 7 February 1301 King Edward I was staying in the Bishop's Palace when he created his son Edward (later King Edward II) as the first Prince of Wales. The building was damaged during the Lincolnshire Rising of 1536 and completely demolished by 1650, only traces of foundations remaining on the site now called Bishop's Palace Field.

The parish church of All Saints dates from the Saxon period, with medieval and 19th century additions. It is now in the benefice of Nettleham with Riseholme and Grange de Lings.

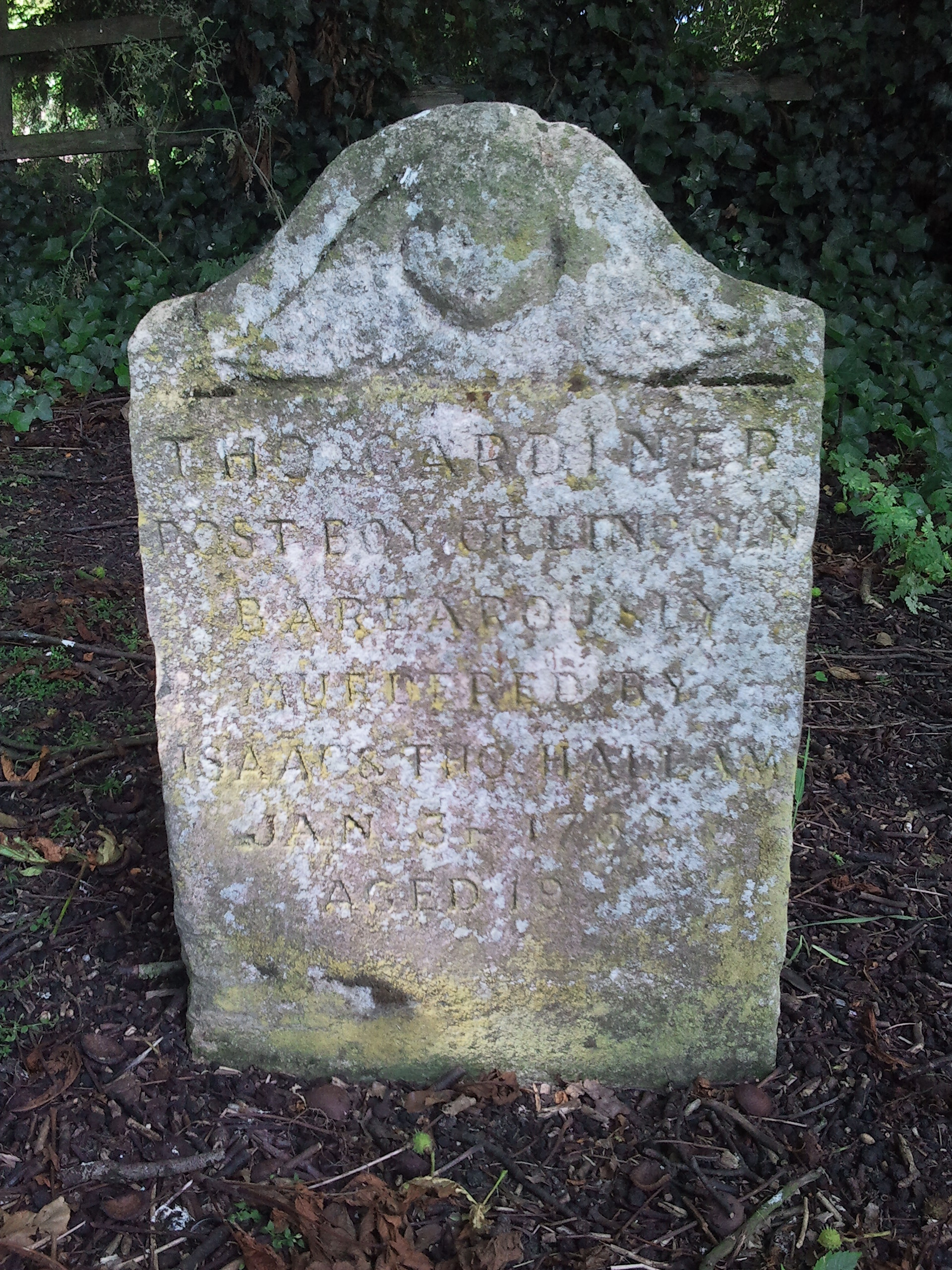
Thomas Gardiner's grave in Nettleham churchyard

Within the church's graveyard is a headstone in memory of Thomas Gardiner, a post-boy murdered hereabouts by two highway robbers in January 1733. The inscription declares he was 'barbarously murdered' aged 19. The robbers - two brothers by the name of Hallam - committed another murder near Faldingworth before being arrested. They were convicted of murder at Lincoln and executed at the site of their crimes. (Thomas Gardiner's headstone declares he was killed on 3 January 1732 since at the time Britain used the Julian Calendar.)

The Royal Society for Nature Conservation (RSNC) had been based in Nettleham but moved to Newark-on-Trent in 1999. The site became the home of the WATCH Trust for Environmental Conservation, but this also moved to Newark a few years later.

== Demography ==
In the 2021 Office for National Statistics Census of Population and Housing, the civil parish of Nettleham's population was reported as 4,128. The population of the civil parish was 3,437 at the 2011 census.

== Transport ==
=== Road ===
The village is lies within three major arterial roads that connect it to Lincoln and the wider region, the A15, A46, and A158. The parish boundaries closely follow the A158 Wragby Road to the southeast and the A15 to the southwest, where it forms part of the Lincoln ring-road. The A15 provides a key link north towards the M180, while the A46 passes to the west of the village and connects northeast to Grimsby and south 3 miles (4.83 km) to Lincoln, the A158 is the primary route to the Lincolnshire coast.

In 2025, the speed limit on the A46 adjacent to Nettleham was reduced from the national speed limit to 40 mph following a Lincoln County Council vote 4 September 2023.

The A46/A15 Nettleham Roundabout is undergoing a major improvement project scheduled to begin in 2026. The approximately £10 million scheme includes widening the roundabout and adding a dedicated foot and cycle bridge over the A15 to improve safety and connectivity for non-motorists travelling between Nettleham and Lincoln.

=== Bus Services ===
Nettleham is served by several regular bus services, primarily operated by Stagecoach East Midlands and the local firm PC Coaches, connecting the village to Lincoln Central Bus Station and surrounding towns. The nearest mainline railway station is Lincoln Central, approximately 4 miles away.

Key services include:

- PC Coaches Route 44: A regular service connecting the village centre (The Green) with Lincoln. This service was renumbered from Route 4 in May 2023.
- Stagecoach Routes 12 & 12A: Connects Lincoln with Welton via Nettleham. The main daytime route 12 serves the Nettleham stop on the A46 opposite Beckside Nursery (formerly The Brown Cow pub), while the evening 12A service is routed via The Green in the village centre. Service 12 runs seven days a week.
- Stagecoach Route 53: A longer-distance service from Lincoln to Market Rasen and Grimsby, which stops at Nettleham Fields.

Additionally, a pre-bookable, on-demand bus service, Callconnect, operates in the area to serve rural communities with limited transport options.

=== Cycling ===
Nettleham is integrated into both national and local cycle networks.

- National Cycle Route 1 (NCN 1): This long-distance route from Dover to the Shetland Islands, runs adjacent to the A46 to the west of Nettleham, east down Deepdale Lane into the village, and out north along Scothern Road. The route primarily uses quiet on-road sections, such as old sections of the A46 dedicated to cycling, and is managed by the charity Sustrans.
- Local Leisure Routes: West Lindsey District Council promotes two circular, on-road leisure routes starting from The Green in Nettleham. Route 1 is a 14-mile (22.5 km) loop, while Route 2 is a longer 26-mile (42 km) ride through surrounding villages.

=== Walking ===
The parish has an extensive network of over 10 km of public rights of way. Nettleham Parish Council takes a proactive role in the network's upkeep through a volunteer-led Fieldpath Advisory Working Group, which helps maintain and promote the paths.

== Governance ==
Since April 1974 Nettleham has formed part of the West Lindsey district of Lincolnshire. It forms part of the Gainsborough parliamentary constituency which is represented by Sir Edward Leigh.

== Geography ==
The parish boundary meets Greetwell on the A158 Horncastle/Wragby road. It follows the A15 Wragby Road into Lincoln for about 110 yards (100.6 m) where it meets Lincoln, and skirts the edge of the housing estate (Glebe Park) next to the bypass; the Lincoln bypass (A158) from the A46 to the A158 is in the parish. The boundary crosses Nettleham Road (B1182, former A46), south of the bypass roundabout, and follows south of the A46 bypass for about 550 yards (502.9 m) and meets Riseholme (south of the bypass). The bypass passes northwards skirting, the edge of the University of Lincoln's Riseholme College. 550 yards north of Nettleham Hall, it meets Grange de Lings, and borders this parish along a farm track until the A46, where it meets Scothern just north of Nettleham Heath Farm. It crosses Scothern Beck north of Skelton House Farm, passes south, and at Nettleham Beck it meets Sudbrooke, crossing Sudbrooke Lane east of Richmond Farm. North of Manor Farm, it meets Reepham on the A158 Roman road and follows the A158 to North Greetwell, where it meets Greetwell.

== Community ==
Nettleham has won the "Best Kept Village Award" several times, and the centre of the village is a conservation area. Large modern housing estates surround the old village centre.

Village public houses are the Black Horse on Chapel Lane, the Plough on Church Street, and the White Hart on High Street.

In 2023, Nettleham topped a LincolnshireLive poll as the 'best place to live in Lincolnshire'.

The parish includes an oil well owned by Star Energy, north of the A158 bypass, that is part of the East Midlands Oil Province's Welton Oil Field, and which has been producing since 1985. It is noted that there is 1.6 MWt extractable heat available within the Welton field and the potential for using the existing well infrastructure for geothermal purposes, like harnessing the naturally warm water for the domestic market or within commercial greenhouses.

== Police headquarters ==
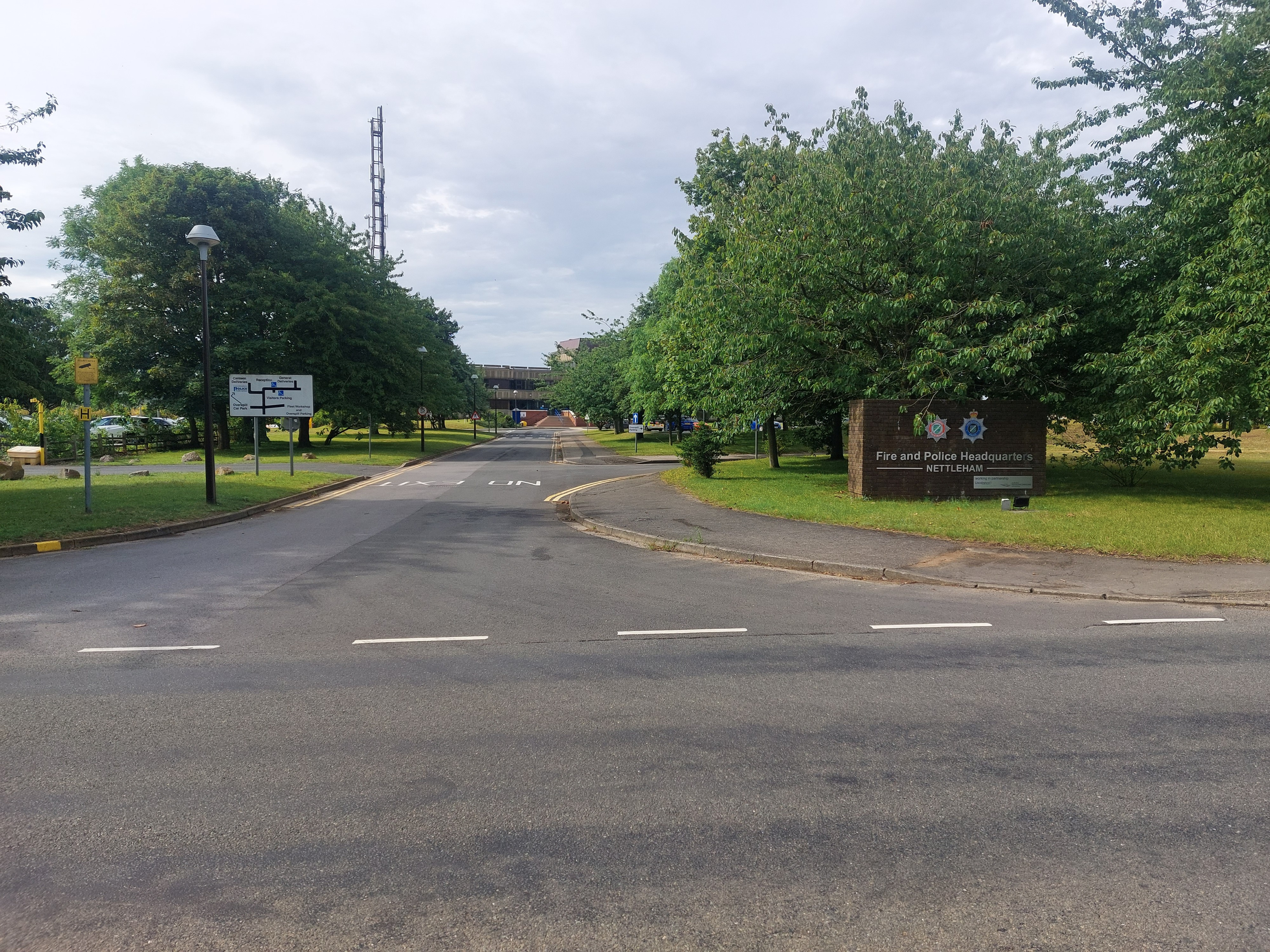
Lincolnshire Fire and Police Headquarters in July 2023

The Deepdale Lane site, west of the village, was chosen in October 1970, to be 38 acres, and cost £2.25m. Five sites were considered. But the Nettleham parish council had not been told in advance, and were annoyed.

Lindsey County Council had previously wanted its headquarters on the opposite side of the road, which the parish council had refused.

In April 1976 a Gainsborough company received the £2,952,598 contract. It finally cost £5.3m, and staff moved in from April 1980. It was opened by Queen Elizabeth II on 14 November 1980.

== Sport ==
=== Football ===
Nettleham's Mulsanne Park is home to Nettleham F.C. and was home to the former Nettleham Ladies F.C., which rebranded as Lincoln City Women FC.

Nettleham F.C., established in 1905 as Nettleham United, adopted its current name, Nettleham FC, in 1989. They have been members of the Lincolnshire League since their relegation from the Central Midlands League. They play their home fixtures at Mulsanne Park, Nettleham. They have twice played Aston Villa football club in friendlies.. It is said that Dwight Yorke's first game on English soil was in Nettleham at Mulsanne Park, 20 December 1989, when the ground celebrated new floodlights. On the 26 February 2001, again celebrating new floodlights, Nettleham F.C. played a Leicester City F.C. IX including Robbie Savage and Roberto Mancini.

Nettleham Ladies FC (now Lincoln City Women FC) was founded in 2008 as Nettleham Ladies, the team started in the Lincolnshire County Women's League and won the title within 12 months. They achieved their sixth consecutive Lincolnshire County Cup victory in the 2017-18 season. Notable former players include Olivia Clark, who played as goalkeeper and later represented the Welsh Women's National Team. In April 2019, Nettleham Ladies partnered with Lincoln City men's club, rebranding as Lincoln City Women FC from June onwards. Following the rebrand, the team moved its home ground to share with Lincoln United.

=== Cricket ===
Nettleham Cricket Club play in the Lincolnshire ECB League. They play their home fixtures at Mulsanne Park, Nettleham.

The village also has a tennis club and has been the new home of Lincoln Rugby Football Club since 2014.

== Twinning ==
- Mulsanne, Pays de la Loire, north-west France. The outdoor sports facility for cricket, football, and tennis is called Mulsanne Park.

== Notable people ==
- Grace Mary Crowfoot (née Hood; born 1879) – A pioneer in the study of archaeological textiles; daughter of Sinclair Frankland Hood of Nettleham Hall.
- Henry Holbeach (died 1551) – Last Prior and first Dean of Worcester; buried here 7 August 1551.
- Allison Pearson – The Daily Telegraph columnist, who grew up on Washdyke Lane in the 1970s.
- Simon Christopher Jones (born 1945) – Footballer, born here.
