= Saxby, Lincolnshire =

Village and civil parish in the West Lindsey district of Lincolnshire, England

Coordinates: 53.362942°N 0.490304°W

Saxby
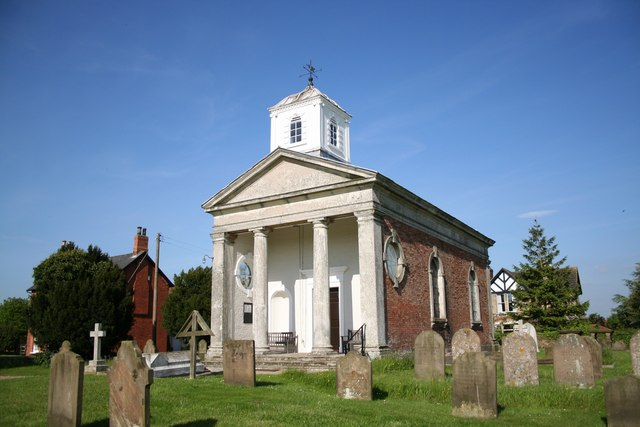
- St Helen's Church, Saxby

- Location within Lincolnshire
- OS grid reference: TF005861
  - London: 140 mi (230 km) S
- District: West Lindsey
- Shire county: Lincolnshire
- Region: East Midlands
- Country: England
- Sovereign state: United Kingdom
- Post town: Market Rasen
- Postcode district: LN8
- Police: Lincolnshire
- Fire: Lincolnshire
- Ambulance: East Midlands
- UK Parliament: Gainsborough

Saxby is a village and civil parish in the West Lindsey district of Lincolnshire, England. It is situated 9 miles (14 km) north from Lincoln and 2.5 miles (4.0 km) east from the A15 road. The population is included in the civil parish of Owmby-by-Spital (called Owmby). The village is part of the Owmby Group of parishes.

St Helens parish church is a Grade I listed building, constructed in 1775 as an ashlar-faced red-brick mortuary chapel. The chapel, later a church, had been attributed to Carr of York (who constructed the nearby Norton Place) but no evidence to prove this has been found. It has been assumed that the Lumbys, who often worked with Carr, might have been the architects. There are of four wall plaques in white marble and Greek style, dating from 1832 to 1856, to the Earl of Scarborough, for whom the chapel was built.

There existed an earlier church in the nearby medieval villages of East and West Firsby, but nothing remains of that or the village.
