= Goltho =

Hamlet in the West Lindsey district of Lincolnshire, England

Coordinates: 53.277942°N 0.32491708°W

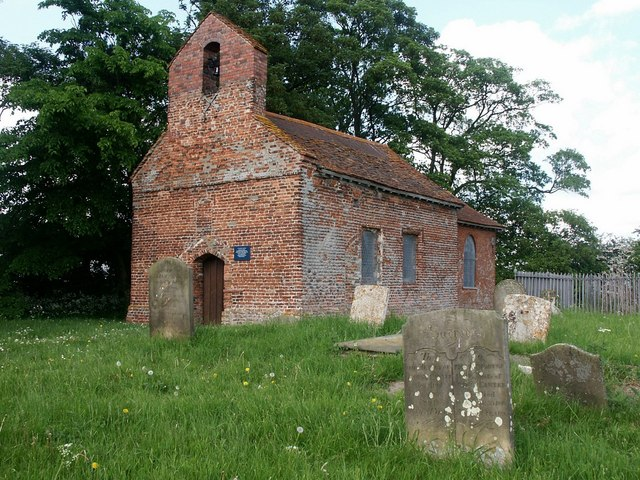
- Church of St George, Goltho

- Location within Lincolnshire
- Population: 157 (Including Rand. 2011)
- OS grid reference: TF117769
  - London: 120 mi (190 km) S
- Civil parish: Goltho
- District: West Lindsey
- Shire county: Lincolnshire
- Region: East Midlands
- Country: England
- Sovereign state: United Kingdom
- Post town: Market Rasen
- Postcode district: LN8
- Dialling code: 01673
- Police: Lincolnshire
- Fire: Lincolnshire
- Ambulance: East Midlands
- UK Parliament: Gainsborough

Goltho is a hamlet in the West Lindsey district of Lincolnshire, England. The population (including Bullington) was 157 at the 2011 census. It is situated 1 mile (1.6 km) south-west from Wragby, and 0.5 miles (0.8 km) south from the A158 road.

Wragby and Goltho Limewood Walk, through one of the Lincolnshire Limewoods national nature reserves, passes Goltho Hall, Goltho Chapel and Goltho deserted medieval village.

== History ==
The settlement has Anglo-Saxon roots.

The origin of the name is uncertain, perhaps from an Old Scandinavian (Viking) first name or the Viking word for "ravine", or as is widely accepted locally, "where the marigolds grow", referred to in Henry Thorold's guide to the redundant St George's Church, Goltho.

The remains of the early medieval village were excavated in the 1970s. A Saxon settlement on the site consisted of two houses; about 850 the site was fortified with the addition of a banked enclosure, and a hall was added. A motte-and-bailey castle was built at Goltho in around 1080.

Goltho Hall was the ancestral seat of the Grantham family. Sir Thomas Grantham (1574–1630) was Sheriff of Lincoln in 1600 and MP for Lincolnshire from 1621 to 1622. He was a shareholder in the Virginia Company and is listed in the Third Virginia Charter of 1612. He was a Puritan and was imprisoned in Lincoln Castle for refusing to pay Ship Money. His son Thomas (1612–1655) was MP for Lincoln during the Long Parliament and raised a regiment of foot which fought at the Battle of Aylesbury in 1642. The hall was eventually sold to the Mainwairing family and demolished in 1812. The present hall was built nearby in 1875.

The village is described in White's 1842 Lincolnshire Directory as "a parish of scattered farms", covering about 1,360 acres (5.5 km^{2}). Goltho ecclesiastical parish was united with Bullington to form one tithe-free parish in the peculier jurisdiction of the Bishop of Lincoln. Together, the two parishes covered about 2,540 acres (10.3 km^{2}).

== Community ==
Goltho is one of 128 civil parishes in the district of West Lindsey, and is approximately 10 miles (16 km) north-east from the city and county town of Lincoln. Wragby parish lies to the east, Rand parish to the north and Apley parish to the south. The parish is skirted at the north by the A158 trunk road as it passes between Lincoln and Horncastle.

The ecclesiastical parish, after the closure of St George’s, is Rand & Goltho, based around the church of St Oswald in Rand. The ecclesiastical parish is part of the Wragby Group of the Deanery of Horncastle. The 2013 incumbent is The Rev'd Mark Holden.

Goltho is part of the Gainsborough Constituency. As of the 2005 general election, the Member of Parliament is Edward Leigh.

There are three listed buildings in Goltho: Goltho Hall and its garden wall and pigeoncote (both Grade II), and the Church of St George (Grade II*). St George's was founded about 1640, with alterations in the 18th and 19th centuries. The church was badly damaged in a fire on 21 October 2013.
