= Rand, Lincolnshire =

Village in Lincolnshire, England

Coordinates: 53.2952°N 0.3433°W

Rand
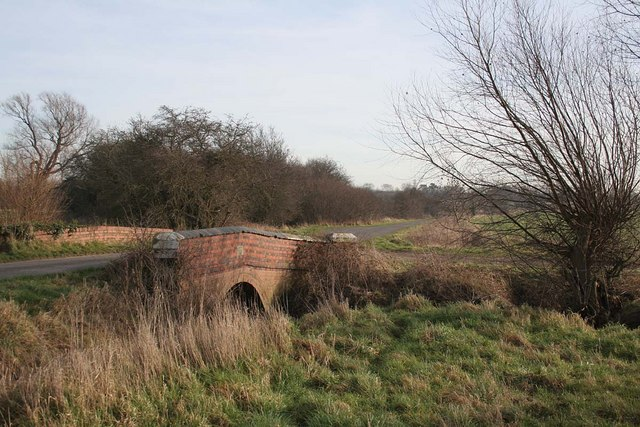
- County Bridge on the parish border with Fulnetby.

- Location within Lincolnshire
- OS grid reference: TF106788
  - London: 125 mi (201 km) S
- District: West Lindsey
- Shire county: Lincolnshire
- Region: East Midlands
- Country: England
- Sovereign state: United Kingdom
- Post town: MARKET RASEN
- Postcode district: LN8
- Police: Lincolnshire
- Fire: Lincolnshire
- Ambulance: East Midlands
- UK Parliament: Gainsborough

Rand is a small village and civil parish in the West Lindsey district of Lincolnshire, England. It is situated approximately 9 miles (14 km) north-east from the city of Lincoln and approximately 2 miles (3 km) west from Wragby, and near the A158 road from Lincoln to Skegness. The nearest large town is Market Rasen, about 5 miles (8 km) north-east. The village is 87 feet (27 m) above sea level. The population is listed under Goltho.

Rand was the home of the father of the 17th-century English writer James Harrington.

== History ==
The name derives from the Old English "Rand", meaning "a place at the border or edge". It is listed in the 1086 Domesday Book as "Rande".

James Harrington (or Harington), the author of Oceana, born 1611 in Upton, Northamptonshire, was the eldest son of Sir Sapcote(s) Harrington of Rand (died 1629), and great-nephew of the first Lord Harington of Exton (died 1615).

== Community ==
The village church is dedicated to St Oswald, which contains a memorial to Sir Vincent Fulnetby (died early 17th century) and his ancestors. The name "Fulnetby", or "Fulnery" in some old records, derives from Old Scandinavian "full+nautr+by" meaning "village of one who has a full share". It appears in the 1086 Domesday Book as "Fulnedebi".

The existing church building dates from the 14th century. It also contains a monument to the Harrington family. A church probably existed here by 1241, and perhaps earlier. The existing building is thought to be at least the third church built at Rand.

The nearest school is in Wragby.

The regional-based civil engineering company UCS Civils, part of the Rand Group of Companies of companies, is based in Rand.

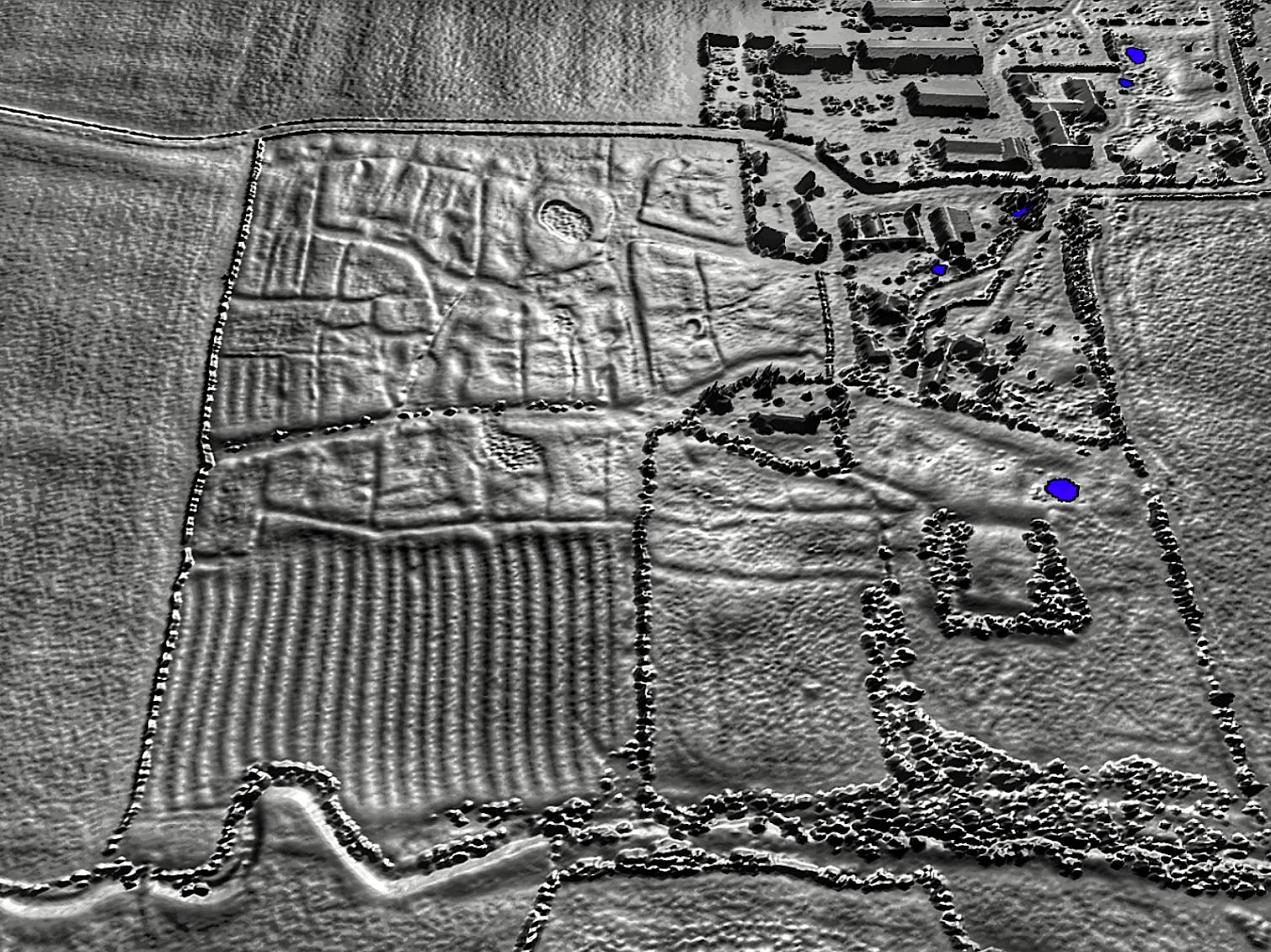
A lidar view of the site of the Medieval part of Rand, viewed from the north.
