= East and West Firsby =

Two hamlets in the West Lindsey district of Lincolnshire, England

Coordinates: 53.356289°N 0.484277°W

East Firsby
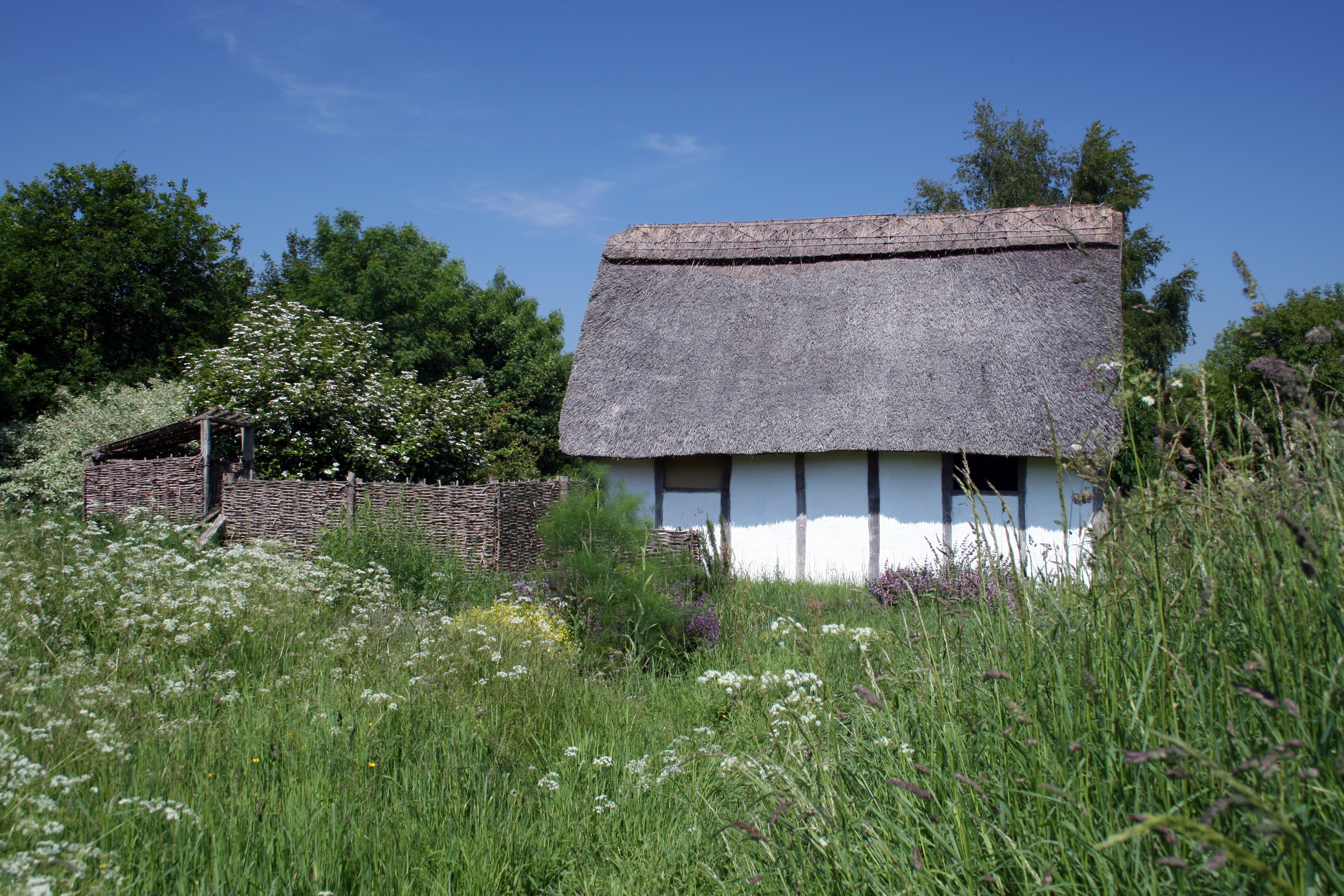
- Saxon House, East Firsby – built to traditional methods

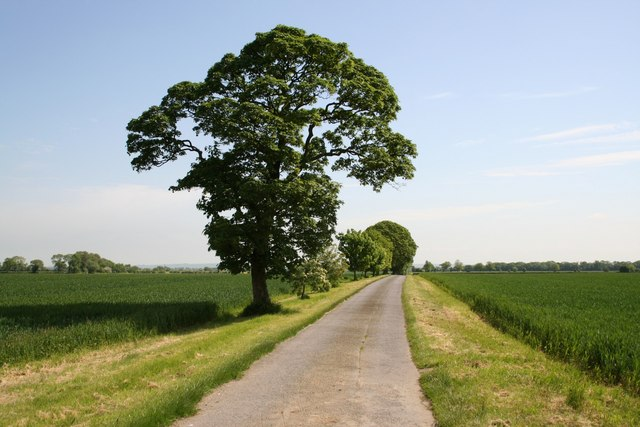
- Lane in East Firsby

- Location within Lincolnshire
- OS grid reference: TF009854
  - London: 130 mi (210 km) S
- Civil parish: West Firsby
- District: West Lindsey
- Shire county: Lincolnshire
- Region: East Midlands
- Country: England
- Sovereign state: United Kingdom
- Post town: Market Rasen
- Postcode district: LN8
- Police: Lincolnshire
- Fire: Lincolnshire
- Ambulance: East Midlands
- UK Parliament: Gainsborough

East Firsby and West Firsby are two hamlets in the West Lindsey district of Lincolnshire, England. They are situated about 10 miles (16 km) north from the city of Lincoln, and set in the Lincolnshire Wolds, a designated Area of Outstanding Natural Beauty.

East Firsby lies between Saxby and Spridlington, with West Firsby about 1 mile (1.6 km) to the west, near the A15 road. East Firsby civil parish was abolished to enlarge that of West Firsby in 1936. There is no church.

The hamlet of Firsby is listed in the 1086 Domesday Book as "Frisebi", with 22 households, 30 acres (0.12 km^{2}) of meadow and a church, with Ilbert of Lacy as Lord of the manor.

The Manor House at West Firsby fell into disrepair and was demolished during the 1990s. At East Firsby is the mid 18th-century Grade II listed Manor Farmhouse, and at West Firsby is a site of a deserted medieval village.

There is an oilfield at West Firsby.
