= Hackthorn =

Village and civil parish in the West Lindsey district of Lincolnshire, England

Coordinates: 53.328830°N 0.50765°W

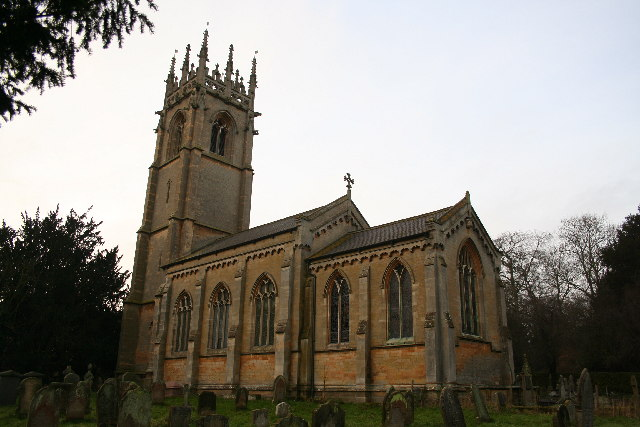
- Church of St Michael, Hackthorn

- Location within Lincolnshire
- Population: 207 (2011)
- OS grid reference: SK994823
  - London: 125 mi (201 km) S
- District: West Lindsey
- Shire county: Lincolnshire
- Region: East Midlands
- Country: England
- Sovereign state: United Kingdom
- Post town: Lincoln
- Postcode district: LN2
- Police: Lincolnshire
- Fire: Lincolnshire
- Ambulance: East Midlands
- UK Parliament: Gainsborough

Hackthorn is a village and civil parish in the West Lindsey district of Lincolnshire, England, to the north of Lincoln.

== Geography ==
It is combined with Cold Hanworth to form the parish council of Hackthorn and Cold Hanworth. The population of the civil parish (including Cold Hanworth) at the 2011 census was 207.

It is situated approximately 6 miles (10 km) north of the city and county town of Lincoln, and 1 mile (1.6 km) east of the A15.

According to the 2001 Census, it had a population of 180.

The village is part of the Owmby Group of parishes.

The village dates back to Roman times. Its most prominent building is its hall, a large square brick house, built in the late 18th century in a landscaped park of around 100 acres (0.40 km^{2}).

There is also a primary school, shop, and village hall.

== History ==
Situated among the trees of the park overlooking the lake is the parish church, dedicated to St Michael and All Angels. A village church is mentioned in the Domesday Book of 1086, although the present church is a Victorian gothic building. It contains carved woodwork in the reredos screen and gallery, and an 1869 Nicholson Organ, fully restored in 2006.

=== World War II ===
A Ju 188 had shot down Avro Lancaster 'NG502' of 460 Sqn near Sudbrooke. In the early hours of March 4 1945, during Operation Gisela, a German Ju 188 of NJG 5 crashed into a vehicle, between Welton and Spridlington, killing the driver, Jack Kelway. The four Germans were buried in Scampton church.
