= Barlings =

Hamlet in the West Lindsey district of Lincolnshire, England

Coordinates: 53.258500°N 0.39045°W

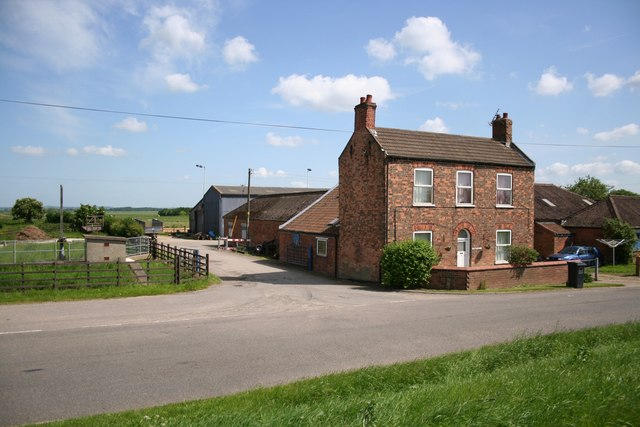
- Farm cottage, Barlings

- Location within Lincolnshire
- Population: 460 ( Including Langworth. 2011)
- OS grid reference: TF074747
  - London: 120 mi (190 km) S
- District: West Lindsey
- Shire county: Lincolnshire
- Region: East Midlands
- Country: England
- Sovereign state: United Kingdom
- Post town: Lincoln
- Postcode district: LN3
- Police: Lincolnshire
- Fire: Lincolnshire
- Ambulance: East Midlands
- UK Parliament: Gainsborough (UK Parliament constituency)

Barlings and Low Barlings are two small hamlets lying south off the A158 road at Langworth, about 7 miles (11 km) east of Lincoln in the West Lindsey district of Lincolnshire, England. Low Barlings is a scattered collection of homes, situated along a trackway south from Barlings towards boggy ground near the River Witham. Both hamlets are in the civil parish of Barlings. The population of the civil parish at the 2011 census was 460.

== History ==
Barlings is listed in the Domesday Book as "Berlinge".

Barlings includes the Grade II listed church of St Edward the Confessor, and Grade I listed Barlings Abbey ruins. Other listed buildings include a hall, house and farm house. Part of the parish was once a medieval deer park.

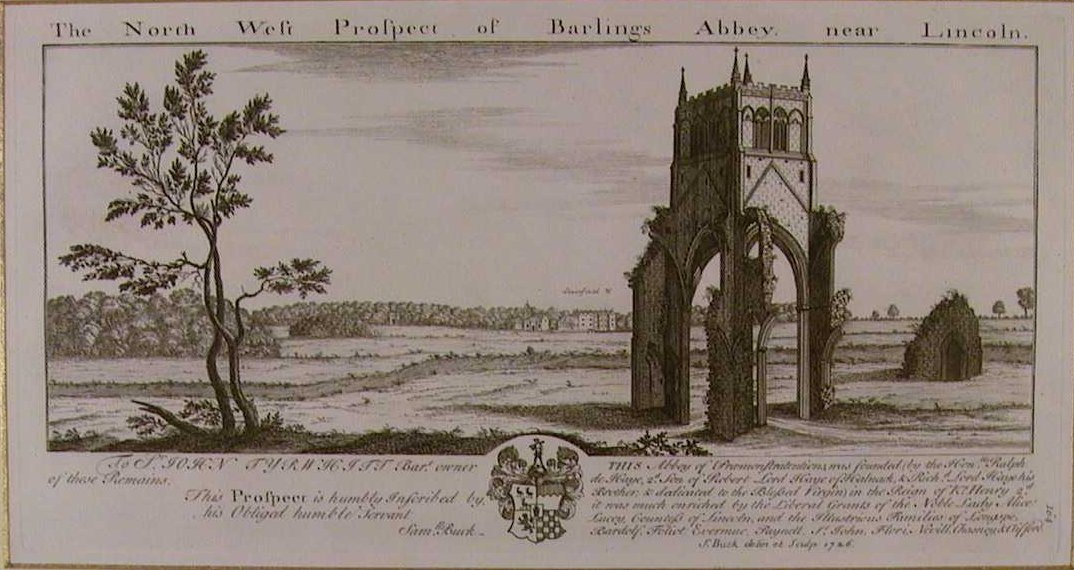
Barlings Abbey 1726

There are no standing remains of Barlings Abbey but the main building outside the monastic church has been interpreted as a detached monastic household such as the abbot's lodging. This building was reformed as a post-dissolution secular residence of Charles Brandon, Duke of Suffolk, who used it as a vice-regal palace. Brandon was King Henry VIII's vice-regent in Lincolnshire in the wake of the Lincolnshire Rising.
