= Fulnetby =

Hamlet and civil parish in the West Lindsey district of Lincolnshire, England

Coordinates: 53.300595°N 0.352685°W

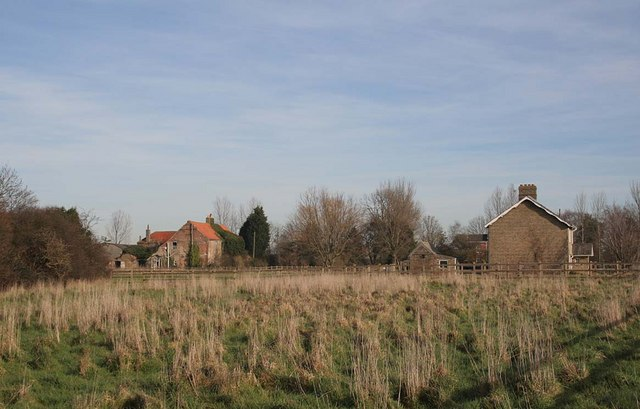
- Fulnetby hamlet

- Location within Lincolnshire
- OS grid reference: TF098794
  - London: 120 mi (190 km) S
- District: West Lindsey
- Shire county: Lincolnshire
- Region: East Midlands
- Country: England
- Sovereign state: United Kingdom
- Post town: Market Rasen
- Postcode district: LN8
- Police: Lincolnshire
- Fire: Lincolnshire
- Ambulance: East Midlands
- UK Parliament: Gainsborough

Fulnetby is a hamlet and civil parish in the West Lindsey district of Lincolnshire, England. It is situated approximately 8 miles (13 km) north-east from the city and county town of Lincoln.

Fulnetby is listed in the 1086 Domesday Book as "Fulnedebi"", with 12 households, 100 acres (0.4 km^{2}) of meadow and 120 acres (0.5 km^{2}) of woodland.

Once larger than the present day hamlet, Fulnetby is considered a deserted medieval village with earthworks in fields east of Fulnetby Hall known as Hall Garths, however since 1953 these have been destroyed and nothing can be seen today.

The deserted medieval village of Helethorpe or Halethorpe was located nearby and was documented from 1212 to 1711, of which only earthworks remain.

Formerly a chapel of ease to Rand, Fulnetby was created a civil parish in 1866 and enlarged by gaining part of Rand in 1887.

Fulnetby Hall is a Grade II listed building dating from the 16th century with a moat on its north and western side.
