= Bullington, Lincolnshire =

Village and civil parish in the West Lindsey district of Lincolnshire, England

Coordinates: 53.288700°N 0.369505°W

Bullington
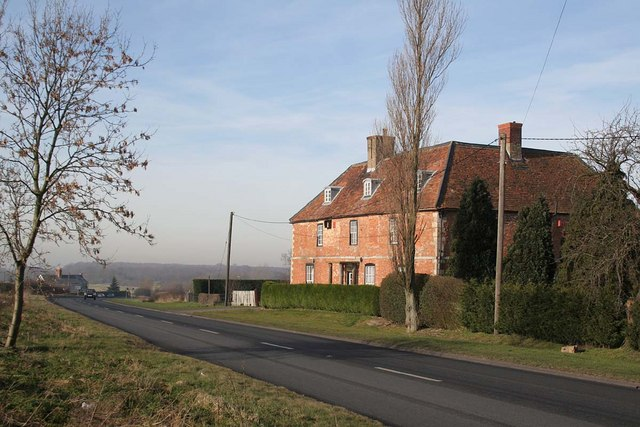
- Bullington Hall

- Location within Lincolnshire
- OS grid reference: TF089779
  - London: 125 mi (201 km) S
- District: West Lindsey
- Shire county: Lincolnshire
- Region: East Midlands
- Country: England
- Sovereign state: United Kingdom
- Post town: Market Rasen
- Postcode district: LN8
- Police: Lincolnshire
- Fire: Lincolnshire
- Ambulance: East Midlands
- UK Parliament: Gainsborough

Bullington is a village and civil parish in the West Lindsey district of Lincolnshire, England. It is situated approximately 8 miles (13 km) north-east from the city of Lincoln and 7 miles (11 km) south from the market town of Market Rasen. According to the 2001 census the village had a population of 36. At the 2011 census the population remained less than 100 and is included in the civil parish of Goltho.

Bullington Hall is a Grade II listed farmhouse within the village, originating in the 17th century with later rebuilding and additions.

Bullington Priory is located in the south of the parish.
