= Cold Hanworth =

Village and civil parish in the West Lindsey district of Lincolnshire, England

Coordinates: 53.336674°N 0.448576°W

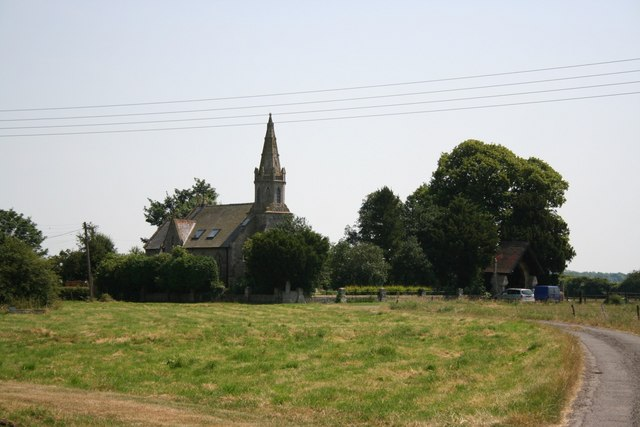
- Church of All Saints, Cold Hanworth

- Location within Lincolnshire
- OS grid reference: TF034833
  - London: 125 mi (201 km) S
- Civil parish: Cold Hanworth
- District: West Lindsey
- Shire county: Lincolnshire
- Region: East Midlands
- Country: England
- Sovereign state: United Kingdom
- Post town: Lincoln
- Postcode district: LN2
- Police: Lincolnshire
- Fire: Lincolnshire
- Ambulance: East Midlands
- UK Parliament: Gainsborough

Cold Hanworth is a village and civil parish in the West Lindsey district of Lincolnshire, England. It is situated 8 miles (13 km) north-north-east from the city and county town of Lincoln, and just north of the A46. It is combined with Hackthorn to form the parish council of Hackthorn and Cold Hanworth.

The cruciform church of All Saints was rebuilt in 1861, replacing one of medieval origin. The Grade II listed building was converted to a private house and renamed Old Church House in 1966. It has been disused since 1973. A further listed building is a farm cottage on Green Lane.

At the south of the village are the earthwork remains of Cold Hanworth medieval village. This settlement was established in the 11th century but abandoned by the 18th.

Cold Hanworth Forge is a working forge and blacksmithing school.
