= Greetwell, West Lindsey =

Village and civil parish in the West Lindsey district of Lincolnshire, England

Coordinates: 53.232432°N 0.480933°W

Greetwell
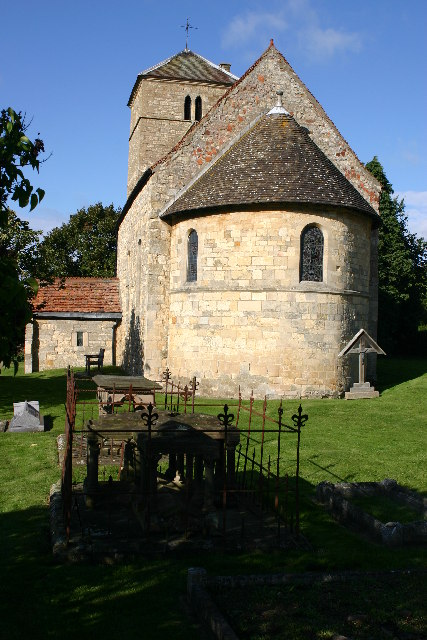
- All Saints' Church, Greetwell

- Location within Lincolnshire
- Population: 823 (2011)
- OS grid reference: TF014716
  - London: 115 mi (185 km) S
- District: West Lindsey
- Shire county: Lincolnshire
- Region: East Midlands
- Country: England
- Sovereign state: United Kingdom
- Post town: Lincoln
- Postcode district: LN3
- Police: Lincolnshire
- Fire: Lincolnshire
- Ambulance: East Midlands
- UK Parliament: Gainsborough

Greetwell is a village and civil parish in the West Lindsey district of Lincolnshire, England. The population of the civil parish at the 2011 census was 823. It is situated 2 miles (3 km) east from the city of Lincoln.

Greetwell parish church is dedicated to All Saints, and is a Grade II* listed limestone building dating from the 11th century, and restored in the 19th. Both the west tower and the font date from the 13th century. On the north side of the apse is an early 13th-century tombstone, inscribed: "Hic Jacet Adanz de London Quandam Rectoristius ecclesiac cujus aizinzae propiehir Deus" There are two ashlar monuments in the apse to Richard Lely, who died 1734 and Anna Lely, died 1733. There is also a marble gravestone in the apse floor to Robert Dalyson, died 1620.

The village is listed in the 1086 Domesday Book with twenty two households, 16 acres (0.1 km^{2}) of meadow, one mill, two fisheries, and a church. There are earthwork remains of the medieval village either side of the railway line which are scheduled.

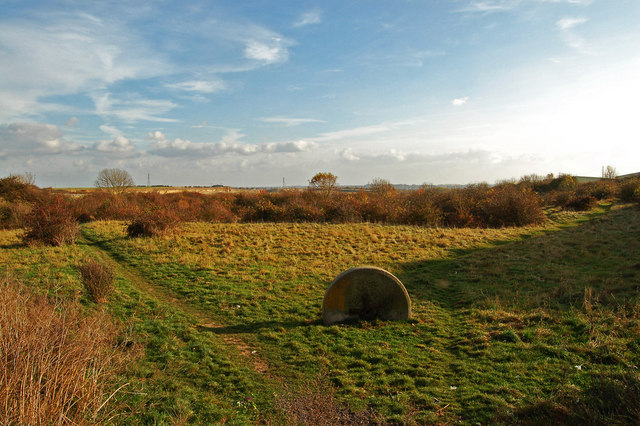
Greetwell Hollow Nature Reserve

Greetwell Hollow is a former quarry, now a nature reserve managed by the Lincolnshire Wildlife Trust. Greetwell Hollow Quarry is also a Site of Special Scientific Interest (SSSI) situated on land owned by the Church Commissioners
