= Stainton by Langworth =

Hamlet and civil parish in the West Lindsey district of Lincolnshire, England

Coordinates: 53.286680°N 0.406835°W

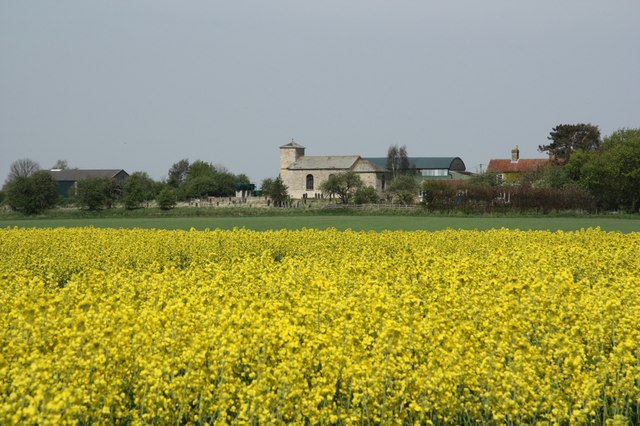
- Stainton by Langworth

- Location within Lincolnshire
- Population: 80 (2001)
- OS grid reference: TF063778
  - London: 130 mi (210 km) S
- District: West Lindsey
- Shire county: Lincolnshire
- Region: East Midlands
- Country: England
- Sovereign state: United Kingdom
- Post town: LINCOLN
- Postcode district: LN3
- Police: Lincolnshire
- Fire: Lincolnshire
- Ambulance: East Midlands
- UK Parliament: Gainsborough

Stainton by Langworth is a hamlet and civil parish in the West Lindsey district of Lincolnshire, England. It is situated less than 1 mile (1.6 km) north-west from the A158 road, 7 miles (11 km) north-east from Lincoln and 13 miles (21 km) north-west from Horncastle.

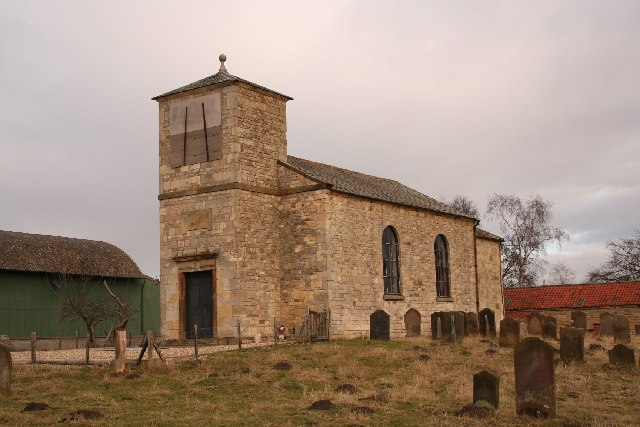
St.John the Baptist's church

There is a war memorial in the parish church of St John the Baptist, a Grade II listed building constructed in 1795. An 1885 restoration incorporates earlier 14th-century material, including a font.
