= West Lindsey District Council elections =

Local elections in Lincolnshire, England

West Lindsey District Council in Lincolnshire, England is elected every four years. Prior to 2011 one third of the council was each year, except in every fourth year when there was an election to the county council instead.

The district is divided into 20 wards, electing 36 councillors. The last ward boundary changes came into effect in 2015.

== Council elections ==
- 1973 West Lindsey District Council election
- 1976 West Lindsey District Council election
- 1979 West Lindsey District Council election (New ward boundaries)
- 1980 West Lindsey District Council election
- 1982 West Lindsey District Council election
- 1983 West Lindsey District Council election
- 1984 West Lindsey District Council election (District boundary changes took place but the number of seats remained the same)
- 1986 West Lindsey District Council election
- 1987 West Lindsey District Council election
- 1988 West Lindsey District Council election
- 1990 West Lindsey District Council election (District boundary changes took place but the number of seats remained the same)
- 1991 West Lindsey District Council election
- 1992 West Lindsey District Council election
- 1994 West Lindsey District Council election
- 1995 West Lindsey District Council election
- 1996 West Lindsey District Council election
- 1998 West Lindsey District Council election
- 1999 West Lindsey District Council election (New ward boundaries)
- 2000 West Lindsey District Council election
- 2002 West Lindsey District Council election
- 2003 West Lindsey District Council election
- 2004 West Lindsey District Council election
- 2006 West Lindsey District Council election
- 2007 West Lindsey District Council election
- 2008 West Lindsey District Council election (Some new ward boundaries)
- 2010 West Lindsey District Council election
- 2011 West Lindsey District Council election
- 2015 West Lindsey District Council election (New ward boundaries)
- 2019 West Lindsey District Council election
- 2023 West Lindsey District Council election

== Results maps ==
2002 results map

2003 results map

2004 results map

2006 results map

2007 results map

2008 results map

2010 results map

2011 results map

2015 results map

2019 results map

2023 results map

== By-election results ==
=== 1994-1998 ===
Scampton By-Election 17 July 1997
Party	Candidate	Votes	%	±%
Liberal Democrats		285	58.0	
Conservative		173	35.3	
Labour		33	6.7	
Majority		112	22.7	
Turnout		491	35.6	
Liberal Democrats gain from Conservative		Swing		

=== 1998-2002 ===
Yarborough By-Election 10 December 1998
Party	Candidate	Votes	%	±%
Labour		207	48.1	+0.1
Conservative		169	39.3	+19.6
Liberal Democrats		54	12.6	−12.6
Majority		38	8.8	
Turnout		430	19.0	
Labour hold		Swing		

=== 2002-2006 ===
Cherry Willingham By-Election 13 March 2003
Party	Candidate	Votes	%	±%
Liberal Democrats	Adrian Heath	593	55.8	+22.6
Conservative	Andrew Brylewski	470	44.2	−9.5
Majority		123	11.6	
Turnout		1,063	33.3	
Liberal Democrats gain from Independent		Swing		

Market Rasen By-Election 19 June 2003
Party	Candidate	Votes	%	±%
Liberal Democrats	David Kitchen	483	44.4	+2.7
Conservative	Jennifer Norman	347	31.9	−16.6
Independent	John Semple	258	23.7	+23.7
Majority		136	12.5	
Turnout		1,088	28.7	
Liberal Democrats hold		Swing		

=== 2006-2010 ===
Lea By-Election 18 May 2006
Party	Candidate	Votes	%	±%
Liberal Democrats	Ian Parsons	621	61.4	+27.3
Conservative	Hugh McDaniel	391	38.6	+19.8
Majority		230	22.8	
Turnout		1,012	57.4	
Liberal Democrats gain from Independent		Swing		

Middle Rasen By-Election 9 October 2008
Party	Candidate	Votes	%	±%
Conservative	Geoff Wiseman	400	76.2	+36.5
UKIP		125	23.8	+13.4
Majority		275	52.4	
Turnout		525	22.5	
Conservative gain from Liberal Democrats		Swing		

Saxilby By-Election 20 August 2009
Party	Candidate	Votes	%	±%
Conservative	Jacqueline Brockway	722	60.6	+22.4
Liberal Democrats	Dean Woolley	407	34.2	−27.6
UKIP	Steven Pearson	62	5.2	+5.2
Majority		315	26.4	
Turnout		1,191	28.3	
Conservative gain from Liberal Democrats		Swing		

=== 2011-2015 ===
Nettleham by-election 6 September 2012
Party	Candidate	Votes	%	±%
Conservative	Giles McNeill	565	45.0	+5.6
Liberal Democrats	Guy Grainger	513	40.9	−19.7
UKIP	Howard Thompson	177	14.1	+14.1
Majority		52	4.1	
Turnout		1,255		
Conservative gain from Liberal Democrats		Swing		

Gainsborough East by-election 14 February 2013
Party	Candidate	Votes	%	±%
Liberal Democrats	Mark Binns	169	28.6	−15.7
Labour	Mick Devine	149	25.3	−6.3
UKIP	Howard Thompson	143	24.2	+24.2
Conservative	Richard Butroid	129	21.9	−2.2
Majority		20	3.4	
Turnout		590		
Liberal Democrats hold		Swing		

Scotter by-election 19 December 2013
Party	Candidate	Votes	%	±%
Independent	Chris Day	529	51.2	+51.2
Conservative	John Cox	219	21.2	−33.7
Liberal Democrats	Barry Coward	148	14.3	−1.4
UKIP	Howard Thompson	138	13.3	+13.3
Majority		310	30.0	
Turnout		1,034		
Independent gain from Conservative		Swing		

Scotter by-election 27 February 2014
Party	Candidate	Votes	%	±%
Conservative	Pat Mewis	577	65.7	+10.8
Liberal Democrats	Keith Panter	301	34.3	+18.6
Majority		276	31.4	
Turnout		878		
Conservative hold		Swing		

=== 2015-2019 ===
Cherry Willingham by-election 29 September 2016
Party	Candidate	Votes	%	±%
Conservative	Maureen Palmer	555	51.1	+12.2
Labour	Wendy Beckett	288	26.5	+0.6
UKIP	Trevor Bridgwood	244	22.4	+22.4
Majority		267	24.6	
Turnout		1,087		
Conservative hold		Swing		

Scotter and Blyton by-election 27 July 2017
Party	Candidate	Votes	%	±%
Conservative	Bruce Allison	694	44.0	+12.2
Liberal Democrats	Liz Clews	555	35.1	+8.8
Labour	Jonathan Harper	230	14.6	−1.3
UKIP	Neville Jones	100	6.3	+6.3
Majority		139	8.8	
Turnout		1,579		
Conservative hold		Swing		

Sudbrooke by-election 16 November 2017
Party	Candidate	Votes	%	±%
Conservative	Bob Waller	391	69.6	+0.7
Labour	Gareth Hart	171	30.4	+10.5
Majority		220	39.2	
Turnout		562		
Conservative hold		Swing		

Sudbrooke by-election 16 November 2017
Party	Candidate	Votes	%	±%
Conservative	Bob Waller	391	69.6	+0.7
Labour	Gareth Hart	171	30.4	+10.5
Majority		220	39.2	
Turnout		562		
Conservative hold		Swing		

=== 2019-2023 ===
Torksey by-election 24 October 2019
Party	Candidate	Votes	%	±%
Conservative	Jayne Ellis	378	35.7	−22.9
Liberal Democrats	Noel Mullally	346	32.6	−8.8
Brexit Party	Nick Pearson	299	28.2	+28.2
Labour	Perry Smith	37	3.5	+3.5
Majority		32	3.0	
Turnout		1,060		
Conservative hold		Swing		

Kelsey Wold by-election 6 May 2021
Party	Candidate	Votes	%	±%
Conservative	Peter Morris	565	62.6	−1.6
Liberal Democrats	Louise Reece	243	26.9	−8.9
Labour	Colin Saywell	94	10.4	+10.4
Majority		322	35.7	
Turnout		902		
Conservative hold		Swing		

Nettleham by-election 16 December 2021
Party	Candidate	Votes	%	±%
Liberal Democrats	Jaime Oliver	585	51.0	+1.1
Conservative	Maureen Palmer	374	32.6	−17.2
Labour	Jess McGuire	116	10.1	+10.1
Green	Benjamin Loryman	71	6.2	+6.2
Majority		211	18.4	
Turnout		1,146		
Liberal Democrats gain from Conservative		Swing		
