= 2008 West Lindsey District Council election =

2008 English local government election

Map of the 2008 West Lindsey District Council election

The 2008 West Lindsey District Council election took place on 1 May 2008 to elect a third of the members of West Lindsey District Council, the council of West Lindsey in England. This was on the same day as the other 2008 United Kingdom local elections. The election happened under new ward boundaries. In the election, the Conservative Party gained from the council from the Liberal Democrats. The previous council election took place in 2007 and the following election was held in 2010.

== Results ==
| Party | Previous | Seats +/- | 2008 |
|---|---|---|---|
| Conservative | 16 | ▲4 | 20 |
| Liberal Democrat | 20 | ▼4 | 16 |
| Others | 1 | Steady | 1 |

== See also ==
- West Lindsey District Council elections
