= West Riding of Lindsey =

Coordinates: 53.4°N 0.7°W

The West Riding of Lindsey was a division of the Lindsey part of Lincolnshire in England, along with the North and South ridings. It consisted of the north-western part of the county, and included the Isle of Axholme and the Aslacoe, Corringham, Manley, Lawress, and Well wapentakes.

The administrative centre of the riding was Kirton-in-Lindsey, and the meeting place of the riding was Spital-in-the-Street. It is the most populous of the ridings, and covered 461 square miles (1,190 km^{2}). At the time of the Domesday Book, the riding also contained Lincoln, although in 1409 the city left to become a county corporate. Other important towns included Gainsborough.

In April 1974, it became part of the West Lindsey district of Lincolnshire and the county of Humberside, under the Local Government Act 1972.
