= Riding (division) =

Administrative jurisdiction

A riding is an administrative jurisdiction or electoral district, particularly in several current or former Commonwealth countries.

== Etymology ==
The word riding is descended from late Old English þriðing or *þriding (recorded only in Latin contexts or forms, e.g., trehing, treding, trithing, with Latin initial t here representing the Old English letter thorn). It came into Old English as a loanword from Old Norse þriðjungr, meaning a third part (especially of a county) – the original "ridings", in the English counties of Yorkshire and Lincolnshire, were in each case a set of three, though once the term was adopted elsewhere it was used for other numbers (compare to farthings). The modern form riding was the result of the initial th being absorbed in the final th or t of the words north, south, east and west, by which it was normally preceded.

A common misconception holds that the term arose from some association between the size of the district and the distance that can be covered or encircled on horseback in a certain amount of time (compare the Walking Purchase).

== Australia ==
The term was used in Australia as a division of some shire councils, similar to a ward in city, borough, town and many shire councils.

== Canada ==
The term was used in 19th-century Canada to refer to subdivisions of counties.

In Canadian politics, riding is a colloquial term for a constituency or electoral district. Officially, electoral district is generally used, although government documents sometimes use the colloquial term. In colloquial Canadian French, a riding is known as comté, i.e., 'county', as the electoral districts in Quebec were historically identical to its counties; the official French term is circonscription.

The Canadian use of riding is derived from the English local government term, which was widely used in Canada in the 19th century. Most Canadian counties never had sufficient population to justify administrative subdivisions. Nonetheless, it was common, especially in Ontario, to divide counties with sufficient population into multiple electoral districts, which thus became known as ridings in official documents. The term was used in the legal descriptions of the electoral districts of Canada West in the Province of Canada. It was later used in the description of the new electoral districts which were created by the Constitution Act, 1867, for the first elections to the new federal House of Commons and the new provincial Legislative Assembly of Ontario, immediately following Confederation. Soon after Confederation, the urban population grew (and more importantly, most city dwellers gained the franchise after property ownership was no longer required to gain the vote). Rural constituencies therefore became geographically larger through the 20th century and generally encompassed one or more counties each, and the word riding was then used to refer to any electoral division.

The local association for a political party, which legally is known as an electoral district association, is often referred to as a riding association.

== Ireland ==
The Grand Jury (Ireland) Act 1836 empowered the Lord Lieutenant of Ireland to divide Irish counties into ridings with separate assizes held in different towns. This was to allow County Tipperary to be divided in 1838 into a North Riding and South Riding, because the county town of Clonmel was inconveniently far south for jurors from the north. Nenagh became the North Riding's assize town. The ridings became separate administrative counties, with minor boundary adjustments, under the Local Government (Ireland) Act 1898, and were redenominated as counties "North Tipperary" and "South Tipperary" under the Local Government Act 2001. They were merged back into a single County Tipperary by the Local Government Reform Act 2014.

County Cork had been divided in 1823 into East and West Ridings for quarter sessions and petty sessions, but not for assizes, and so had a single county council after the 1898 changes. County Galway from 1837 had East and West Ridings for Royal Irish Constabulary and county surveyor purposes. The Cork and Galway ridings became largely obsolete after independence in 1922, although the names "Cork East[/West] Riding" were used for the relevant Garda Síochána (police) divisions into the 1990s.

== New Zealand ==
Ridings existed in rural New Zealand in the late 19th and early to mid 20th century as part of larger county councils in the area. For example, The Taranaki County Council was divided into three separate ridings: Moa (south), Omata (west) and Waitara (east).

As use of the automobile became more popular with the improvement of roads, combined with the concurrent trend of urban drift (c. 1950s), the ridings were either merged back into their parent councils or separated off into county councils in their own right. The Taranaki County Council's three ridings eventually split, with the Omata Riding remaining part of the Taranaki County Council, the Moa riding merging with the Inglewood Borough Council and the Waitara Riding becoming part of the Clifton County Council.

In 1989 these were again merged, reorganised into district and/or city councils. For example, the above three all merged with the New Plymouth Council and Waitara Borough Councils to form the New Plymouth District Council.

Examples:

- Daily Southern Cross, 30 November 1876, Page 3
- Census, 1916. Return Showing the Population of the Dominion

== Scandinavia ==
Ridings are originally Scandinavian institutions.

In Iceland the third part of a thing which corresponded roughly to an English county was called þrithjungr. The island of Gotland and the Swedish provinces Närke and Hälsingland were also divided into þrithjungar instead of hundreds.

In Norway, the þrithjungr seems to have been an ecclesiastical division.

== United Kingdom ==
=== England ===
==== Yorkshire ====
The ancient county of Yorkshire had three ridings, North, West and East, originally each subdivided into wapentakes which were created by the Vikings. The bounds of the City of York lay outside all the ridings to emphasise its political impartiality.

The Yorkshire ridings were in many ways treated as separate administrative counties, having had separate quarter sessions and also separate lieutenancies since the Restoration. This practice was followed by the Local Government Act 1888, which made each of the three ridings an administrative county with an elected county council. These county councils, along with the ancient lieutenancies, were abolished in 1974 under the Local Government Act 1972.

A local government area, East Riding of Yorkshire, was created in 1996, but this does not cover the entire area of the former East Riding and includes areas from the historical West Riding.

According to the 12th century compilation known as the Leges Edwardi Confessoris, the riding was the third part of a county (provincia); to it causes were brought which could not be determined in the wapentake, and a matter which could not be determined in the riding was brought into the court of the shire.

Riding courts were held after the Norman Conquest. A charter which Henry I granted to the Church of St Peters at York mentions wapentacmot, tridingmot and shiresmot (-mot designates popular assemblies), and exemptions from suit to the thriding or riding are described in the charters of the Norman kings. As yet, however, the jurisdiction and functions of these courts have not been ascertained. It seems probable from the silence of the records that they had already fallen into disuse early in the 13th century.

Although no longer having any administrative role, the ridings of Yorkshire still play a part as cultural entities – they are used for the names of a number of groups and organisations and some people in Yorkshire associate themselves with one riding or another (see current usage of West Riding of Yorkshire). Winifred Holtby's 1936 novel South Riding and its adaptations were set in a fictional fourth riding. The title of the novel trilogy Red Riding by David Peace, set in Yorkshire, is a play on the word.

The Yorkshire Ridings Society calls for wider recognition of the historic borders of Yorkshire.

==== Lindsey, Lincolnshire ====
The Parts of Lindsey, one of the Parts of Lincolnshire, also possessed ridings, in this case the North, West, and South ridings.

The administrative county of the Parts of Lindsey was abolished on 1 April 1974 under the Local Government Act 1972, which reformed local government across England and Wales.

== Farthings ==
The term is analogous to fourths of a county, in a fashion similar to the old British farthing. They have also been found in Iceland and Gloucestershire.

=== In fiction ===
In J. R. R. Tolkien's fictional world Middle-earth, The Shire, the homeland of the hobbits, is divided into farthings.

== See also ==
- Lathe
- Rape
