= Thorganby =

Thorganby could be

- Thorganby, Lincolnshire
- Thorganby, North Yorkshire

== See also ==
- Thormanby, North Yorkshire
