= 2010 West Lindsey District Council election =

2010 English local government election

Map of the 2010 West Lindsey District Council election

The 2010 West Lindsey District Council election took place on 6 May 2010 to elect a third of the members of West Lindsey District Council, the council of West Lindsey in England. This was on the same day as the other local elections across England as well as the 2010 United Kingdom general election. The election was the second to be held under new ward boundaries introduced in 2008. In the election, the Conservative Party retained from the council over the Liberal Democrats. The previous council election took place in 2008 and the following election was held in 2011.

== Results ==
Party	Previous	Seats +/-	2008
Conservative	20	▲1	21
Liberal Democrat	14	Steady	14
Others	3	▼1	Steady

== See also ==
- West Lindsey District Council elections
