= Swinhope =

Village and civil parish in West Lindsey, Lincolnshire, England

Coordinates: 53.448081°N 0.16630715°W

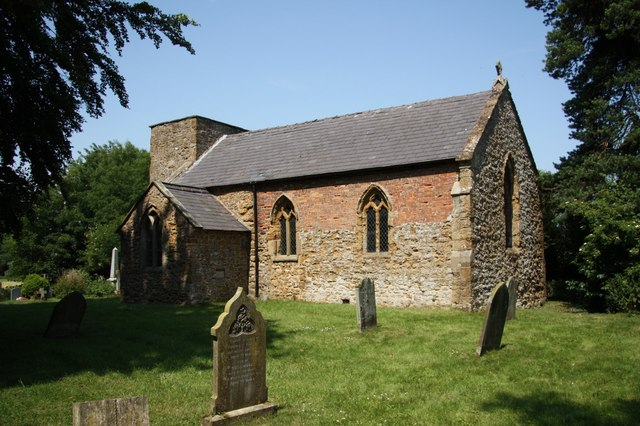
- St Helen's Church

- Location within Lincolnshire
- Area: 11.7 km^{2} (4.5 sq mi)
- Population: 172 (2011 census)
  - Density: 15/km^{2} (39/sq mi)
- Civil parish: Swinhope
- District: West Lindsey
- Shire county: Lincolnshire
- Region: East Midlands
- Country: England
- Sovereign state: United Kingdom
- Post town: Market Rasen
- Postcode district: LN8
- Police: Lincolnshire
- Fire: Lincolnshire
- Ambulance: East Midlands
- UK Parliament: Gainsborough

Swinhope is a village and civil parish about six miles west south west of North Thoresby railway station, in the West Lindsey district, in the county of Lincolnshire, England. In 2011 the parish had a population of 172. The parish touches Wold Newton, Thorganby, Brookenby, Binbrook and Stainton Le Vale. Swinhope doesn't have a formal parish council and instead holds parish meetings. In 2011, Nomis recorded a population of 194 which includes Thorganby parish. Swinhope was a deserted medieval village. The remains were completely destroyed in 1969 but crop marks remain within the village grounds.

== Features ==
There are four listed buildings in Swinhope.

== History ==
Swinhope was recorded in the Domesday Book as Suinhope. The name "Swinhope" means 'Swine valley'. Swinyhope is an alternative name for Swinhope as recorded in 1887.

The Alington family were the main landowners here for centuries. The best-known member of the family was Marmaduke Alington MP (1671-1749).
