= Market Rasen Urban District =

Former local government area in the UK

Market Rasen
- Market Rasen Urban District shown within Parts of Lindsey in 1970
- Area
  - 1911: 976 acres (3.95 km^{2})
  - 1961: 976 acres (3.95 km^{2})
- Population
  - 1911: 2,296
  - 1961: 2,267
- History
  - Created: 1894
  - Abolished: 1974
  - Succeeded by: West Lindsey
- Status: Urban District
- Government: Market Rasen Urban District Council
  - HQ: Market Rasen

Market Rasen was an urban district in Parts of Lindsey, Lincolnshire, England, from 1894 to 1974, created under the Local Government Act 1894.

The district was abolished in 1974 under the Local Government Act 1972 and merged with other local government districts in the western part of Lindsey to form the new West Lindsey district.
