= Caistor Rural District =

Former local government area in the UK

Coordinates: 53.5°N 0.3°W

Caistor
- Caistor Rural District shown within Parts of Lindsey in 1970.
- History
  - Created: 1894
  - Abolished: 1974
  - Succeeded by: West Lindsey
- Status: Rural district

Caistor was a rural district in Lincolnshire, Parts of Lindsey from 1894 to 1974.

It was formed by the Local Government Act 1894 from Caistor rural sanitary district. It entirely surrounded, but did not include, the town of Market Rasen.

It was abolished in 1974 under the Local Government Act 1972, becoming part of the West Lindsey district.
