= Horncastle Rural District =

Former local government area in the UK

Coordinates: 53.20°N 0.16°W

Horncastle
- Horncastle Rural District shown within Parts of Lindsey in 1970.
- History
  - Created: 1894
  - Abolished: 1974
  - Succeeded by: East Lindsey
- Status: Rural district

Horncastle was a rural district in Parts of Lindsey, Lincolnshire, England, from 1894 to 1974.

It was formed under the Local Government Act 1894 from the Horncastle Rural Sanitary District. It entirely surrounded the town of Horncastle, which was an urban district, and also surrounded Woodhall Spa on three sides.

The rural district was abolished under the Local Government Act 1972 and merged with other districts to form the district of East Lindsey.
