= 2019 West Lindsey District Council election =

2019 UK local government election

Results of the 2019 West Lindsey District Council election

The 2019 West Lindsey District Council election took place on 2 May 2019 to elect members of West Lindsey District Council in England. This was on the same day as other local elections. The Conservatives maintained overall control of the council, albeit with a reduced majority.

== Results summary ==
West Lindsey District Council Election Result 2019
| Party | Seats | Gains | Losses | Net gain/loss | Seats % | Votes % | Votes | +/− |
|---|---|---|---|---|---|---|---|---|
| Conservative | 19 | 1 | 6 | -5 | 52.78 | 44.30 | 17,106 | -4.30 |
| Liberal Democrats | 12 | 6 | 1 | +5 | 33.33 | 31.35 | 12,104 | +8.76 |
| Independent | 3 | 2 | 0 | +2 | 8.33 | 7.44 | 2,871 | +1.75 |
| Lincolnshire Independent | 2 | 1 | 0 | +1 | 5.56 | 5.52 | 2,133 | +3.33 |
| Labour | 0 | 0 | 3 | -3 | 0.00 | 6.95 | 2,683 | -10.03 |
| UKIP | 0 | - | - | 0 | 0.00 | 3.11 | 1,201 | -0.84 |
| Green | 0 | - | - | 0 | 0.00 | 1.33 | 513 | +1.33 |

== Council composition ==
Following the last election in 2015, the composition of the council was:

↓
| 24 | 7 | 3 | 1 | 1 |
| Conservative | Lib Dem | Lab | I | LI |

After the election, the composition of the council was:

↓
| 19 | 12 | 3 | 2 |
| Conservative | Lib Dem | I | LI |

Lab - Independent
I - Independent
LI - Lincolnshire Independents

== Ward results ==
Incumbent councillors are denoted by an asterisk (*).

=== Bardney ===
Bardney (1 seat)
| Party | Candidate | Votes | % | ±% |
|---|---|---|---|---|
| Conservative | Ian Gordon Fleetwood* | 479 | 66.07 | +12.87 |
| Independent | Robert John Webb | 154 | 21.24 | |
| Independent | Charles William Shaw | 92 | 12.69 | |
| Majority | | 325 | 44.83 | +15.23 |
| Turnout | | 725 | 35.0 | −30.3 |
| Conservative hold | | Swing | | |

A total of 7 ballots were rejected.

=== Caistor and Yarborough ===
Caistor and Yarborough (2 seats)
| Party | Candidate | Votes | % | ±% |
|---|---|---|---|---|
| Conservative | Angela Theresa Lawrence* | 934 | 65.68 | |
| Conservative | Owen Charles Bierley* | 904 | 63.57 | |
| Labour | Nancy Barr | 358 | 25.18 | |
| Labour | Andrea Maria Clarke | 354 | 24.89 | |
| Turnout | | | 33 | −32.9 |
| Conservative hold | | Swing | | |
| Conservative hold | | Swing | | |

A total of 56 ballots were rejected.

=== Cherry Willingham ===
Cherry Willingham (3 seats)
| Party | Candidate | Votes | % | ±% |
|---|---|---|---|---|
| Lincolnshire Independent | Chris Darcel* | 1,154 | 59.21 | |
| Lincolnshire Independent | Sharon Cherie Hill | 979 | 50.23 | |
| Conservative | Anne Welburn | 690 | 35.40 | |
| Conservative | Thomas Longley | 592 | 30.37 | |
| Conservative | Maureen Florence Palmer | 570 | 29.25 | |
| UKIP | Trevor John Bridgwood | 433 | 22.22 | |
| Turnout | | | 32 | −37.8 |
| Lincolnshire Independent hold | | Swing | | |
| Lincolnshire Independent gain from Conservative | | Swing | | |
| Conservative hold | | Swing | | |

A total of 26 ballots were rejected.

=== Dunholme and Welton ===
Dunholme and Welton (3 seats)
| Party | Candidate | Votes | % | ±% |
|---|---|---|---|---|
| Independent | Diana Meriel Rodgers* | 1,180 | 56.41 | |
| Conservative | Steve England* | 865 | 41.35 | |
| Conservative | Caralyne Margaret Grimble | 718 | 34.32 | |
| Liberal Democrats | Paul Swift | 707 | 33.80 | |
| Conservative | Malcolm John William Parish* | 656 | 31.36 | |
| Independent | Anjum Sawhney | 499 | 23.85 | |
| Turnout | | | 32 | −39.2 |
| Independent hold | | Swing | | |
| Conservative hold | | Swing | | |
| Conservative hold | | Swing | | |

A total of 15 ballots were rejected.

=== Gainsborough East ===
Gainsborough East (3 seats)
| Party | Candidate | Votes | % | ±% |
|---|---|---|---|---|
| Independent | Tim Davies | 290 | 35.19 | |
| Liberal Democrats | David Paul Dobbie | 269 | 32.65 | |
| Independent | Mick Devine* | 257 | 31.19 | |
| Independent | Richard William Oaks | 254 | 30.83 | |
| Liberal Democrats | Richard John Craig | 246 | 29.85 | |
| Liberal Democrats | Kristan Jorge Smith | 188 | 22.82 | |
| Labour | Angelene Janet Wright | 152 | 18.45 | |
| Labour | David Partick Bond* | 144 | 17.48 | |
| Labour | Jonathan Mark Harper | 130 | 15.78 | |
| Conservative | Joshua Anthony Jones | 125 | 15.17 | |
| Conservative | Peter David Morris | 116 | 14.08 | |
| Turnout | | | 16 | −31 |
| Independent gain from Labour | | Swing | | |
| Liberal Democrats gain from Labour | | Swing | | |
| Independent gain from Labour | | Swing | | |

Devine was previously elected as a Labour councillor. A total of 19 ballots were rejected.

=== Gainsborough North ===
Gainsborough North (3 seats)
| Party | Candidate | Votes | % | ±% |
|---|---|---|---|---|
| Liberal Democrats | Matt Boles* | 568 | 46.37 | |
| Liberal Democrats | Jim Snee | 517 | 42.20 | |
| Liberal Democrats | Keith Richard Panter | 416 | 33.96 | |
| Conservative | Sheila Christine Bibb* | 297 | 24.24 | |
| Conservative | John Graham Patrick | 229 | 18.69 | |
| UKIP | Gary John Austen | 221 | 18.04 | |
| UKIP | Sophie May Austen | 213 | 17.39 | |
| UKIP | John Edwin Saxon | 209 | 17.06 | |
| Labour | Sheila Frances Jennings | 198 | 16.16 | |
| Conservative | Peter Francis McNeill | 193 | 15.76 | |
| Labour | Robert Andrew Adderley | 176 | 14.37 | |
| Labour | Michael Harry Edward Eddowes | 161 | 13.14 | |
| Turnout | | | 23 | −30.2 |
| Liberal Democrats gain from Conservative | | Swing | | |
| Liberal Democrats hold | | Swing | | |
| Liberal Democrats gain from Conservative | | Swing | | |

A total of 19 ballots were rejected.

=== Gainsborough South West ===
Gainsborough South West (2 seats)
| Party | Candidate | Votes | % | ±% |
|---|---|---|---|---|
| Liberal Democrats | Judy Rainsforth* | 534 | 58.55 | |
| Liberal Democrats | Trevor Victor Young* | 529 | 58.00 | |
| Labour | David John Cormack | 163 | 17.87 | |
| Labour | Perry Peter Smith | 138 | 15.13 | |
| UKIP | Neville Shaun Jones | 125 | 13.71 | |
| Independent | Denise Mary Schofield | 88 | 9.65 | |
| Conservative | Henry Speer | 71 | 7.79 | |
| Independent | Steve Schofield | 57 | 6.25 | |
| Turnout | | | 23 | −23.8 |
| Liberal Democrats hold | | Swing | | |
| Liberal Democrats hold | | Swing | | |

A total of 8 ballots were rejected.

=== Hemswell ===
Hemswell (1 seat)
| Party | Candidate | Votes | % | ±% |
|---|---|---|---|---|
| Conservative | Paul David John Howitt-Cowan* | 418 | 66.14 | +7.74 |
| Liberal Democrats | Karen Dawn Bacon | 214 | 33.86 | +25.46 |
| Majority | | 204 | 32.28 | −8.22 |
| Turnout | | 632 | 30 | −33.2 |
| Conservative hold | | Swing | | |

A total of 22 ballots were rejected.

=== Kelsey Wold ===
Kelsey Wold (1 seat)
| Party | Candidate | Votes | % | ±% |
|---|---|---|---|---|
| Conservative | Charles Lewis Strange* | 546 | 64.16 | +0.86 |
| Liberal Democrats | Louise Amanda Reece | 305 | 35.84 | +29.14 |
| Majority | | 241 | 28.32 | −17.18 |
| Turnout | | 851 | 40 | −33.8 |
| Conservative hold | | Swing | | |

A total of 23 ballots were rejected.

=== Lea ===
Lea (1 seat)
| Party | Candidate | Votes | % | ±% |
|---|---|---|---|---|
| Conservative | Jessie Brenda Milne* | 452 | 67.77 | +3.67 |
| Green | Sue Greenall | 214 | 32.23 | |
| Majority | | 237 | 35.54 | −9.76 |
| Turnout | | 667 | 38 | −30.6 |
| Conservative hold | | Swing | | |

A total of 13 ballots were rejected.

=== Market Rasen ===
Market Rasen (3 seats)
| Party | Candidate | Votes | % | ±% |
|---|---|---|---|---|
| Liberal Democrats | Stephen Bunney | 1,030 | 47.16 | |
| Conservative | John Carl McNeill* | 896 | 41.03 | |
| Conservative | Cordelia Emma Julia McCartney | 893 | 40.89 | |
| Conservative | Thomas Jacob Neil Smith* | 853 | 39.06 | |
| Liberal Democrats | June Clark | 762 | 34.89 | |
| Liberal Democrats | Robert David Henri Levison | 727 | 33.29 | |
| Labour | Colin Saywell | 262 | 12.00 | |
| Labour | Geoffrey John Barnes | 243 | 11.13 | |
| Labour | Lee Martin Simpson | 204 | 9.34 | |
| Turnout | | | 33 | −32.9 |
| Liberal Democrats gain from Conservative | | Swing | | |
| Conservative hold | | Swing | | |
| Conservative hold | | Swing | | |

A total of 46 ballots were rejected.

=== Nettleham ===
Nettleham (2 seats)
| Party | Candidate | Votes | % | ±% |
|---|---|---|---|---|
| Conservative | Giles Patrick McNeill* | 635 | 50.16 | |
| Liberal Democrats | Angela May White* | 632 | 49.92 | |
| Liberal Democrats | Christopher Higham | 580 | 45.81 | |
| Conservative | John Stephen Barrett | 506 | 39.97 | |
| Turnout | | | 28 | −36.6 |
| Conservative hold | | Swing | | |
| Liberal Democrats hold | | Swing | | |

A total of 32 ballots were rejected.

=== Saxilby ===
Saxilby (2 seats)
| Party | Candidate | Votes | % | ±% |
|---|---|---|---|---|
| Conservative | Jackie Brockway* | 841 | 54.43 | |
| Liberal Democrats | David John Cotton* | 555 | 35.92 | |
| Conservative | Sarah Jane Ellis | 513 | 33.20 | |
| Green | Simon John Cowell | 299 | 19.35 | |
| Turnout | | | 35 | −35.5 |
| Conservative hold | | Swing | | |
| Liberal Democrats hold | | Swing | | |

A total of 24 ballots were rejected.

=== Scampton ===
Scampton (1 seat)
| Party | Candidate | Votes | % | ±% |
|---|---|---|---|---|
| Conservative | Roger Michael Patterson* | Uncontested | | |
| Conservative hold | | Swing | | |

=== Scotter and Blyton ===
Scotter and Blyton (3 seats)
| Party | Candidate | Votes | % | ±% |
|---|---|---|---|---|
| Liberal Democrats | Lesley Anne Rollings | 992 | 55.33 | |
| Liberal Democrats | Liz Clews | 946 | 52.76 | |
| Liberal Democrats | Mandy Snee | 830 | 46.29 | |
| Conservative | Sally Pamela Loates | 745 | 41.55 | |
| Conservative | Ken Woolley | 737 | 41.10 | |
| Conservative | Ian Richard Bradley | 668 | 37.26 | |
| Turnout | | | 31 | −22.6 |
| Liberal Democrats gain from Conservative | | Swing | | |
| Liberal Democrats hold | | Swing | | |
| Liberal Democrats gain from Conservative | | Swing | | |

A total of 83 ballots were rejected.

=== Stow ===
Stow (1 seat)
| Party | Candidate | Votes | % | ±% |
|---|---|---|---|---|
| Conservative | Tracey Jane Coulson | Uncontested | | |
| Conservative gain from Liberal Democrats | | Swing | | |

=== Sudbrooke ===
Sudbrooke (1 seat)
| Party | Candidate | Votes | % | ±% |
|---|---|---|---|---|
| Conservative | Bob Waller | Uncontested | | |
| Conservative hold | | Swing | | |

=== Torksey ===
Torksey (1 seat)
| Party | Candidate | Votes | % | ±% |
|---|---|---|---|---|
| Conservative | Stuart Francis Kinch | 472 | 58.56 | |
| Liberal Democrats | Noel Joseph Mullally | 334 | 41.44 | |
| Majority | | 138 | 17.12 | |
| Turnout | | 806 | 35 | |
| Conservative hold | | Swing | | |

A total of 38 ballots were rejected.

=== Waddingham and Spital ===
Waddingham and Spital (1 seat)
| Party | Candidate | Votes | % | ±% |
|---|---|---|---|---|
| Conservative | Jeff Summers* | 492 | 68.81 | −6.89 |
| Liberal Democrats | Neil Taylor | 223 | 31.19 | +6.89 |
| Majority | | 269 | 37.62 | −13.78 |
| Turnout | | 715 | 37 | −35.5 |
| Conservative hold | | Swing | | |

A total of 19 ballots were rejected.

=== Wold View ===
Wold View (1 seat)
| Party | Candidate | Votes | % | ±% |
|---|---|---|---|---|
| Conservative | Tom Regis | Unopposed | | |
| Conservative hold | | Swing | | |

== Changes 2019–2023 ==
=== Torksey ===
Torksey: 24 October 2019
| Party | Candidate | Votes | % | ±% |
|---|---|---|---|---|
| Conservative | Sarah Ellis | 378 | 35.7 | −22.9 |
| Liberal Democrats | Noel Mullally | 346 | 32.6 | −8.8 |
| Brexit Party | Nicholas Pearson | 299 | 28.2 | N/A |
| Labour | Perry Smith | 37 | 3.5 | N/A |
| Majority | | 32 | 3.1 | −14.1 |
| Turnout | | 1,060 | 43 | +8.0 |
| Conservative hold | | Swing | ▼7.1 | |

Paul Howitt-Cowan left the Conservatives in January 2021.

=== Nettleham ===
Nettleham: 16 December 2021
| Party | Candidate | Votes | % | ±% |
|---|---|---|---|---|
| Liberal Democrats | Jaime Oliver | 585 | 51.0 | +1.2 |
| Conservative | Maureen Palmer | 374 | 32.6 | −17.5 |
| Labour | Jessica McGuire | 116 | 10.1 | N/A |
| Green | Benjamin Loryman | 71 | 6.2 | N/A |
| Majority | | 211 | 18.4 | |
| Turnout | | 1,150 | 32.0 | |
| Liberal Democrats gain from Conservative | | Swing | ▲9.4 | |

Steve England left the Conservatives in August 2022 and sat the remainder of his term as an independent councillor.
