= Parts of Lincolnshire =

Historic subdivisions of Lincolnshire, England

Map of historic Lincolnshire showing its historic three subdivisions of Holland, Kesteven and the three ridings of Lindsey

The Parts of Lincolnshire are the three subdivisions of the historic county of Lincolnshire. They were used for local government until the enactment of the Local Government Act 1972 in 1974.

The three parts are Lindsey in the north, itself are traditionally divided into three ridings (North, South and West); Kesteven in the south-west; and Holland in the south-east. The three parts touch in a tripoint somewhere near Chapel Hill.

Each of the parts had its own quarter sessions, and each became an administrative county with its own county council in 1889. Grimsby and Lincoln were both county boroughs outside the administrative counties.

This arrangement lasted until 1974, when the administrative counties and county boroughs were abolished. The north of Lindsey became part of the new county of Humberside and was divided between five districts, and the remainder of Lincolnshire was divided into seven districts. Each county was two-tier, with the district councils beneath a county council. Humberside was abolished in 1996 and its districts reorganised into unitary authority areas, with North East Lincolnshire and North Lincolnshire becoming part of the ceremonial county of Lincolnshire.

Although the parts no longer exist as units of local government, they are still recognised as broad geographical areas of Lincolnshire, and their names live on in some of the county's district councils (East and West Lindsey, North and South Kesteven, and South Holland).

== Quarter sessions ==
Venues for quarter sessions in Lincolnshire in 1846
Term→ ↓Area	Epiphany	Easter	Midsummer	Michaelmas
Kesteven	Bourne	Bourne	Bourne	Boston
Holland	Bourne	Bourne	Bourne	Boston
Lindsey (first division)	Kirton in Lindsey	Kirton in Lindsey	Kirton in Lindsey	Kirton in Lindsey
Lindsey (second division)	Spilsby	Louth	Spilsby	Louth

In 1906, quarter sessions were held at Lincoln for Lindsey, at Bourne and Sleaford for Kesteven, and at Spalding and Boston for Holland.

== See also ==
- Lathe (county subdivision)
- Rape (county subdivision)
- Riding (division)
- Hundred (county division)
- List of hundreds of England
- List of hundreds of Wales
