= 2015 West Lindsey District Council election =

2015 UK local government election

Results of the 2015 West Lindsey District Council election

The 2015 West Lindsey District Council election took place on 7 May 2015 to elect members of West Lindsey District Council in England. This was on the same day as other local elections.

== Result ==
West Lindsey District Council Election Result 2015
Party	Seats	Gains	Losses	Net gain/loss	Seats %	Votes %	Votes	+/−
Conservative	24				66.67	48.60	39,529	
Liberal Democrats	7				19.44	22.59	18,372	
Labour	3				8.33	16.98	13,815	
Independent	1				2.78	5.69	4,625	
Lincolnshire Independent	1				2.78	2.19	1,782	
UKIP	0				0.00	3.95	3,214	

== Council composition ==
After the election, the composition of the council was:

↓
24	7	3	1	1
Conservative	Lib Dem	Lab	I	LI

Lab - Independent
I - Independent
LI - Lincolnshire Independents

== Ward results ==
=== Bardney ===
Bardney
Party	Candidate	Votes	%	±%
Conservative	Ian Gordon Fleetwood	715	53.2	
UKIP	David Thomas Walton	318	23.6	
Lincolnshire Independent	Maurice Bellwood	221	16.4	
Liberal Democrats	Charles William Shaw	91	6.8	
Turnout		1,345	65.3	

=== Caistor & Yarborough ===
Caistor & Yarborough (2)
Party	Candidate	Votes	%	±%
Conservative	Angela Theresa Lawrence	1,175	47	
Conservative	Owen Charles Bierley	1,164		
Independent	Alan David Caine	955	19.2	
Labour	John Indian	619	23.3	
Labour	Oliver Joseph Jackson	545		
UKIP	Nigel John Wright	527	10.6	
Turnout		4,985	65.9	

=== Cherry Willingham ===
Cherry Willingham (3)
Party	Candidate	Votes	%	±%
Conservative	Alexander John Bridgwood	1,726	57.3	
Conservative	Anne Welburn	1,696		
Lincolnshire Independent	Christopher John Darcel	1,561	18.0	
Conservative	Stephen Robert Trevor	1,540		
Labour	Wendy Dawn Beckett	1,151	24.8	
Labour	Brian Ellis Gulliver	997		
Turnout		8,671	69.8	

=== Dunholme & Welton ===
Dunholme & Welton (3)
Party	Candidate	Votes	%	±%
Conservative	Stephen England	2,228	59.1	
Conservative	Malcolm James William Parish	2,072		
Independent	Diana Meriel Rodgers	1,820	18.3	
Conservative	Anjum Nitu Sawhney	1,588		
Liberal Democrats	Stephen Bunney	1,131	22.6	
Liberal Democrats	Julie Eve Taylor	1,118		
Turnout		9,957	71.2	

=== Gainsborough East ===
Gainsborough East (3)
Party	Candidate	Votes	%	±%
Labour	Michael Devine	885	41.9	
Labour	Richard William Oaks	829		
Labour	David Patrick Bond	772		
Conservative	Clio Lyndon Perraton-Williams	587	27.5	
Conservative	Joshua Anthony Jones	564		
Liberal Democrats	Kenneth Donald Woolley	501	24.9	
Liberal Democrats	David Paul Dobbie	489		
Liberal Democrats	Vaughan Olsson Hughes	489		
Conservative	Peter Francis McNeill	482		
Independent	Michael Tinker	330	5.6	
Turnout		5,928	47.0	

=== Gainsborough North ===
Gainsborough North (3)
Party	Candidate	Votes	%	±%
Conservative	Gillian Florence Bardsley	1,047	38.3	
Liberal Democrats	Matthew David Boles	964	31.3	
Conservative	Sheila Christine Bibb	764		
Conservative	Ashley John Perraton-Williams	710		
Labour	Robert Andrew Adderley	691	30.5	
Labour	Robert Methuen	689		
Labour	Charmaine Lisa Bowers	623		
Liberal Democrats	Keith Richard Panter	555		
Liberal Democrats	Richard John Craig	549		
Turnout		6,592	53.2	

=== Gainsborough South West ===
Gainsborough South West (2)
Party	Candidate	Votes	%	±%
Liberal Democrats	Judith Ann Rainsforth	712	43.3	
Liberal Democrats	Trevor Victor Young	701		
Labour	Casper Francis Hammond	475	28.9	
Labour	Julia Wallis-Martin	471		
Conservative	Deborah Jane Barker	366	21.7	
Conservative	Henry Miles Guthorm Speer	344		
Independent	Timothy Mark Davies	197	6.0	
Turnout		3,266	46.8	

=== Hemswell ===
Hemswell
Party	Candidate	Votes	%	±%
Conservative	Paul David John Howitt-Cowan	818	58.4	
UKIP	Anthony Brian Wells	251	17.9	
Labour	Spencer David Geoffrey Armitage	214	15.3	
Liberal Democrats	Cynthia Margaret Isherwood	118	8.4	
Turnout		1,401	63.2	

=== Kelsey Wold ===
Kelsey Wold
Party	Candidate	Votes	%	±%
Conservative	Charles Lewis Strange	1,009	63.3	
UKIP	Michael John Ranby	283	17.8	
Labour	Janet Susannah Tierney	194	12.2	
Liberal Democrats	Neil Taylor	107	6.7	
Turnout		1,593	73.8	

=== Lea ===
Lea
Party	Candidate	Votes	%	±%
Conservative	Jessie Brenda Milne	783	64.1	
UKIP	Samuel George Wardle	230	18.8	
Labour	Rebecca Geraldine Carmichael	208	17.0	
Turnout		1,221	68.6	

=== Market Rasen ===
Market Rasen (3)
Party	Candidate	Votes	%	±%
Conservative	Charles Edward Hugo Marfleet	1,920	48.5	
Conservative	John Carl McNeill	1,872		
Conservative	Thomas Jacob Neil Smith	1,524		
Liberal Democrats	Kenneth Michael Bridger	1,094	25.5	
UKIP	Howard Thompson	1,075	9.8	
Liberal Democrats	Guy Edward Donald Grainger	898		
Liberal Democrats	Elaine Margaret Whitfield	795		
Labour	Ian Edward Sharp	737	12.6	
Labour	Elizabeth Louise Webster	649		
Independent	Geoffrey Martyn Wiseman	384	3.5	
Turnout		10,948	65.9	

=== Nettleham ===
Nettleham (2)
Party	Candidate	Votes	%	±%
Conservative	Giles Patrick McNeill	1,337	53.1	
Liberal Democrats	Angela May White	1,064	46.9	
Conservative	Maureen Florene Palmer	984		
Liberal Democrats	Roger Anthony Sharp	983		
Turnout		4,368	74.6	

=== Saxilby ===
Saxilby (2)
Party	Candidate	Votes	%	±%
Conservative	Jacqueline Brockway	1,898	54.7	
Liberal Democrats	David John Cotton	1,168	26.8	
Conservative	Jenine Emilie Butroid	953		
Labour	Robert Henry Tubman	499	9.6	
UKIP	Michael McLintock	467	9.0	
Liberal Democrats	Barry Charles Coward	231		
Turnout		5,216	70.5	

=== Scampton ===
Scampton
Party	Candidate	Votes	%	±%
Conservative	Roger Michael Patterson	971	65.3	
Labour	Rachel Heskins	516	34.7	
Turnout		1,487	69.7	

=== Scotter & Blyton ===
Scotter & Blyton (3)
Party	Candidate	Votes	%	±%
Conservative	Patricia Anne Mewis	1,752	42.9	
Liberal Democrats	Lesley Anne Rollings	1,314	31.3	
Conservative	Adam Matthew Duguid	1,281		
Independent	Christopher Peter Day	1,136	11.7	
Conservative	Edward Graham Cockcroft Rouse	1,134		
Liberal Democrats	Elizabeth Ann Clews	999		
Labour	William Edward Rodgers	794	14.2	
Liberal Democrats	Sally Pamela Loates	725		
Labour	Mabel Tallulah Dunbar	583		
Turnout		9,718	53.6	

=== Stow ===
Stow
Party	Candidate	Votes	%	±%
Liberal Democrats	Reginald Alan Shore	858	62.4	
Conservative	Richard David Butroid	516	37.6	
Turnout		1,374	71.2	

=== Sudbrooke ===
Sudbrooke
Party	Candidate	Votes	%	±%
Conservative	Stuart Curtis	1,121	68.9	
Labour	Melanie Louisa Tointon	324	19.9	
Liberal Democrats	Mavis Patricia Sharp	181	11.1	
Turnout		1,626	75.5	

=== Torksey ===
Torksey
Party	Candidate	Votes	%	±%
Conservative	Stuart Francis Kinch (elected unopposed)	N/A	N/A	
Turnout		N/A	N/A	

=== Waddingham & Spital ===
Waddingham & Spital
Party	Candidate	Votes	%	±%
Conservative	Jeffrey John Summers	1,089	75.7	
Liberal Democrats	Joseph John Whitfield	350	24.3	
Turnout		1,439	72.5	

=== Wold View ===
Wold View
Party	Candidate	Votes	%	±%
Conservative	Thomas James Regis	799	60.3	
Labour	Mary Elizabeth Teresia Dunton	340	25.6	
Liberal Democrats	Geoffrey Morris	187	14.1	
Turnout		1,326	64.9	

== By-Elections between May 2015 – May 2019 ==
=== Cherry Willingham ===
A by-election was held on 29 September 2016 due to the resignation of Councillor Alexander Bridgwood.

Cherry Willingham (29 September 2016)
Party	Candidate	Votes	%	±%
Conservative	Maureen Florence Palmer	555	51.1	
Labour	Wendy Dawn Beckett	288	26.5	
UKIP	Trevor John Bridgwood	244	22.4	
Turnout		1,087	17.6	
Conservative hold		Swing		
