= 2023 West Lindsey District Council election =

Local election in England

- 4 May 2023

All 36 seats on West Lindsey District Council 19 seats needed for a majority

	First party	Second party
Leader	Trevor Young	Owen Bierley
Party	Liberal Democrats	Conservative
Last election	12 seats, 31.4%	19 seats, 44.3%
Seats before	13	16
Seats after	18	14
Seat change	▲6	▼5
	Third party	Fourth party
Leader	Christopher Darcel
Party	Lincolnshire Independent	Independent
Last election	2 seats, 5.5%	3 seats, 7.4%
Seats before	2	5
Seats after	2	2
Seat change	Steady	▼1
- Map of the results
Leader before election
Owen Bierley
Conservative
No overall control
Leader after election
Trevor Young
Liberal Democrat
No overall control

The 2023 West Lindsey District Council election took place on 4 May 2023 to elect members of West Lindsey District Council in Lincolnshire, England. This was on the same day as other local elections in England.

Prior to the election the council was under no overall control; the Conservatives had won a majority at the previous election in 2019 but had lost their majority during 2021 as a result of changes of allegiance. The council was therefore being run by a administration comprising the Conservatives and three of the independent councillors.

Following the election the Liberal Democrats won exactly half the seats on the council. The Liberal Democrats formed an administration with the support of one of the independent councillors, with Liberal Democrat leader Trevor Young being appointed leader of the council at the subsequent annual council meeting on 22 May 2023.

== Results summary ==
West Lindsey election result.

West Lindsey District Council Election Result 2023
Party	Seats	Gains	Losses	Net gain/loss	Seats %	Votes %	Votes	+/−
Liberal Democrats	18	9	3	▲6	50.0	47.0	10,081	
Conservative	14	3	8	▼5	38.9	37.0	9,312	
Independent	2	1	2	▼1	5.5	5.0		
Lincolnshire Independent	2	1	1	Steady	5.5	4.0		
Labour	0	0	0	Steady	0.0	4.0	1,486	
Green	0	0	0	Steady	0.0	2.0	763	
Reform	0	0	0	Steady	0.0	1.0	518	
TUSC	0	0	0	Steady	0.0	<1.0		
Liberal	0	0	0	Steady	0.0	<1.0	60	

== Ward results ==
West Lindsey District Council election results.

Incumbent councillors are denoted by an asterisk (*).

=== Bardney ===
Bardney (1 seat)
Party	Candidate	Votes	%	±%
Conservative	Ian Fleetwood*	439	60.9	−5.2
Green	Vicky Pearson	149	20.7	New
Liberal Democrats	Caroline Kenyon	73	10.1	New
Liberal	Charles Shaw	60	8.3	−4.4
Majority		290	40	−5
Turnout		721	35	0
Conservative hold		Swing	N/A	

=== Caistor and Yarborough ===
Caistor and Yarborough (2 seats)
Party	Candidate	Votes	%	±%
Conservative	Owen Bierley*	726	58.5	−5.1
Conservative	Angela Lawrence*	699	56.3	−9.4
Liberal Democrats	June Clark	469	37.8	New
Liberal Democrats	Keith Panter	411	33.1	New
Turnout		1,241	28	−5
Conservative hold				
Conservative hold				

=== Cherry Willingham ===
Cherry Willingham (3 seats)
Party	Candidate	Votes	%	±%
Lincolnshire Independent	Chris Darcel*	918	48.8	−10.4
Conservative	Trevor Bridgwood	741	39.4	+4.0
Conservative	Maureen Palmer	740	39.3	+8.9
Liberal Democrats	Emily Morris	675	35.9	New
Liberal Democrats	James Plastow	524	27.9	New
Liberal Democrats	James Ward	505	26.8	New
Conservative	Glen Thompson	491	26.1	−3.2
Turnout		1,891	30	−2
Lincolnshire Independent hold				
Conservative hold				
Conservative gain from Lincolnshire Independent				

=== Dunholme and Welton ===
Dunholme and Welton (3 seats)
Party	Candidate	Votes	%	±%
Liberal Democrats	Paul Swift	1,038	46.9	+13.1
Liberal Democrats	Sabastian Hague	909	41.1	New
Independent	Di Rodgers*	906	41.0	−15.4
Conservative	Caralyne Grimble*	788	35.6	+1.3
Liberal Democrats	Freddie Easters	754	34.1	New
Conservative	Craig Seal	705	31.9	−9.5
Conservative	Emily Sharman	670	30.3	−1.1
Turnout		2,229	33	+1
Liberal Democrats gain from Conservative				
Liberal Democrats gain from Conservative				
Independent hold				

=== Gainsborough East ===
Gainsborough East (3 seats)
Party	Candidate	Votes	%	±%
Liberal Democrats	Matt Boles**	534	64.3	+34.4
Liberal Democrats	Dave Dobbie*	397	47.8	+15.1
Liberal Democrats	Jacob Flear	382	46.0	+23.2
Independent	Mick Devine*	186	22.4	−8.8
Labour	Perry Smith	161	19.4	+0.9
Independent	Tim Davies*	154	18.6	−16.6
Conservative	Andrew Burge	130	15.7	+0.5
Conservative	Ken Downey	110	13.3	−0.8
TUSC	Michael Hancock	68	8.2	New
Turnout		835	16	0
Liberal Democrats gain from Independent				
Liberal Democrats hold				
Liberal Democrats gain from Independent				

- Matthew Boles represented the Gainsborough North ward from 2015 to 2023.

=== Gainsborough North ===
Gainsborough North (3 seats)
Party	Candidate	Votes	%	±%
Liberal Democrats	Jim Snee*	622	51.5	+9.3
Lincolnshire Independent	Paul Key	585	48.4	New
Liberal Democrats	Mandy Snee**	555	45.9	−0.5
Liberal Democrats	Sean Brennan	503	41.6	+7.6
Green	Nigel Bowler	341	28.2	New
Conservative	Hugh McDaniel	226	18.7	−5.5
Turnout		1,212	23	−1
Liberal Democrats hold				
Lincolnshire Independent gain from Liberal Democrats				
Liberal Democrats hold				

- Mandy Snee represented the Scotter and Blyton ward from 2019 to 2023.

=== Gainsborough South West ===
Gainsborough South West (2 seats)
Party	Candidate	Votes	%	±%
Liberal Democrats	Trevor Young*	551	68.3	+10.3
Liberal Democrats	Jeanette McGhee	477	59.1	+0.5
Labour	Harry Eddowes	122	15.1	−2.8
Independent	Richard Craig	108	13.4	New
Conservative	Vicki Woodward	102	12.6	+4.8
Reform	Stuart Morley	69	8.6	New
Turnout		810	21	−2
Liberal Democrats hold				
Liberal Democrats hold				

=== Hemswell ===
Hemswell (1 seat)
Party	Candidate	Votes	%	±%
Independent	Paul Howitt-Cowan	307	45.8	−20.3
Conservative	Richard Butroid	212	31.6	−34.5
Liberal Democrats	Richard Barstow	151	22.5	−11.4
Majority		95	14	N/A
Turnout		670	32	+2
Independent gain from Conservative		Swing	N/A	

=== Kelsey Wold ===
Kelsey Wold (1 seat)
Party	Candidate	Votes	%	±%
Conservative	Peter Morris	Unopposed		
Conservative hold		Swing		

=== Lea ===
Lea (1 seat)
Party	Candidate	Votes	%	±%
Liberal Democrats	Emma Bailey	356	51.4	New
Conservative	Jessie Milne*	337	48.6	−19.2
Majority		19	2	N/A
Turnout		693	39	+1
Liberal Democrats gain from Conservative		Swing	N/A	

=== Market Rasen ===
Market Rasen (3 seats)
Party	Candidate	Votes	%	±%
Liberal Democrats	Stephen Bunney*	1,539	69.0	+21.8
Liberal Democrats	Eve Bennett	1,041	46.7	+11.8
Liberal Democrats	Moira Westley	859	38.5	+5.2
Conservative	John McNeil*	693	31.1	−9.9
Conservative	Laura Ashby	623	27.9	−13.0
Conservative	Rachel Bridgwood	561	25.2	−13.9
Labour	Colin Saywell	341	15.3	+3.3
Labour	Katie Vause	332	14.9	+3.8
Turnout		2,239	34	+1
Liberal Democrats hold				
Liberal Democrats gain from Conservative				
Liberal Democrats gain from Conservative				

=== Nettleham ===
Nettleham (2 seats)
Party	Candidate	Votes	%	±%
Conservative	John Barrett	641	43.0	+3.0
Conservative	Frazer Brown	593	39.7	−10.5
Liberal Democrats	Peter Hladun	475	31.8	−18.1
Labour	Jess McGuire	409	27.4	New
Liberal Democrats	Heather Shore	295	19.8	−26.0
Green	Christine Johnson	273	18.3	New
Reform	Jane Smith	62	4.2	New
Reform	Alexander Cambo	54	3.6	New
Turnout		1,496	41	+13
Conservative hold				
Conservative gain from Liberal Democrats				

=== Saxilby ===
Saxilby (2 seats)
Party	Candidate	Votes	%	±%
Conservative	Jackie Brockway*	1,055	69.5	+15.1
Conservative	Paul Lee	851	56.1	+22.9
Liberal Democrats	Lorraine Young	475	31.3	−4.6
Liberal Democrats	John Rollings	462	30.5	New
Turnout		1,529	32	−3
Conservative hold				
Conservative gain from Liberal Democrats				

=== Scampton ===
Scampton (1 seat)
Party	Candidate	Votes	%	±%
Conservative	Roger Patterson*	298	37.2	+37.2
Labour	Giles Sullivan	294	36.7	New
Liberal Democrats	Nathan Berger	111	13.8	New
Reform	Nick Smith	99	12.3	New
Majority		4	0	N/A
Turnout		802	38	N/A
Conservative hold		Swing	N/A	

=== Scotter and Blyton ===
Scotter and Blyton (3 seats)
Party	Candidate	Votes	%	±%
Liberal Democrats	Lesley Rollings*	1,037	57.7	+2.4
Liberal Democrats	Liz Clews*	970	54.0	+1.2
Liberal Democrats	Karen Carless	884	49.2	+2.9
Conservative	Sheila Bibb	595	33.1	−8.5
Conservative	Lynne Blakelock	531	29.5	−11.6
Reform	Christine Allison	288	16.0	New
Independent	Kenneth Woolley	262	14.6	−26.5
Turnout		1,808	30	+1
Liberal Democrats hold				
Liberal Democrats hold				
Liberal Democrats hold				

=== Stow ===
Stow (1 seat)
Party	Candidate	Votes	%	±%
Liberal Democrats	Lynda Mullally	387	57.9	New
Conservative	Tracey Coulson*	281	42.1	+42.1
Majority		106	16	N/A
Turnout		668	34	N/A
Liberal Democrats gain from Conservative		Swing	N/A	

=== Sudbrooke ===
Sudbrooke (1 seat)
Party	Candidate	Votes	%	±%
Liberal Democrats	Baptiste Velan	370	51.6	New
Conservative	Anne Welburn**	347	48.4	+48.4
Majority		23	4	N/A
Turnout		717	34	N/A
Liberal Democrats gain from Conservative		Swing	N/A	

- Anne Welburn represented the Cherry Willingham ward from 2008 to 2023.

=== Torksey ===
Torksey (1 seat)
Party	Candidate	Votes	%	±%
Conservative	Roger Pilgrim	438	48.6	−10.0
Liberal Democrats	Noel Mullally	304	33.7	−7.4
Labour	Thomas Cox	159	17.6	New
Majority		134	15	−3
Turnout		901	38	+3
Conservative hold		Swing		

=== Waddingham and Spital ===
Waddingham and Spital (1 seat)
Party	Candidate	Votes	%	±%
Conservative	Alan Duguid	375	58.3	−10.5
Liberal Democrats	Neil Taylor	268	41.7	+10.5
Majority		107	16	−22
Turnout		643	32	−5
Conservative hold		Swing	11	

=== Wold View ===
Wold View (1 seat)
Party	Candidate	Votes	%	±%
Conservative	Tom Smith	342	55.9	+55.9
Liberal Democrats	Robert Levison	270	44.1	New
Majority		72	12	N/A
Turnout		612	31	N/A
Conservative hold		Swing	N/A	
