= Parts of Lindsey =

Historic division of Lincolnshire, England

Coordinates: 53.4333°N 0.2500°W

Lincolnshire, Parts of Lindsey
- History
  - Origin: Kingdom of Lindsey
  - Created: Ancient (part of Lincolnshire); 1889 (administrative county)
  - Abolished: 1974 (administrative county)
  - Succeeded by: Lincolnshire, Humberside
- Status: Part of the historic county Lincolnshire; Administrative county (1889–1974)
- Government: Lindsey County Council
  - HQ: Newland, Lincoln
- Arms of the former Lindsey County Council

The Parts of Lindsey was a traditional division of Lincolnshire, England, covering the northern part of the county. The Isle of Axholme, which is on the west side of the River Trent, has normally formed part of it. The district's name originated from the Kingdom of Lindsey of Anglo-Saxon times, whose territories were merged with that of Stamford to form Lincolnshire.

As with the other historic divisions of Lincolnshire, Lindsey is no longer a local government unit, although its name survives in that of two districts of the county council area Lincolnshire (East and West Lindsey), and it is still recognised as a geographical area.

== Local government ==
When the English shires were established, Lindsey became part of Lincolnshire. It, and each of Kesteven and Holland, acquired the formal designation of Parts of Lincolnshire. Thus it became the Parts of Lindsey.

Former Ridings of Lindsey in Lincolnshire

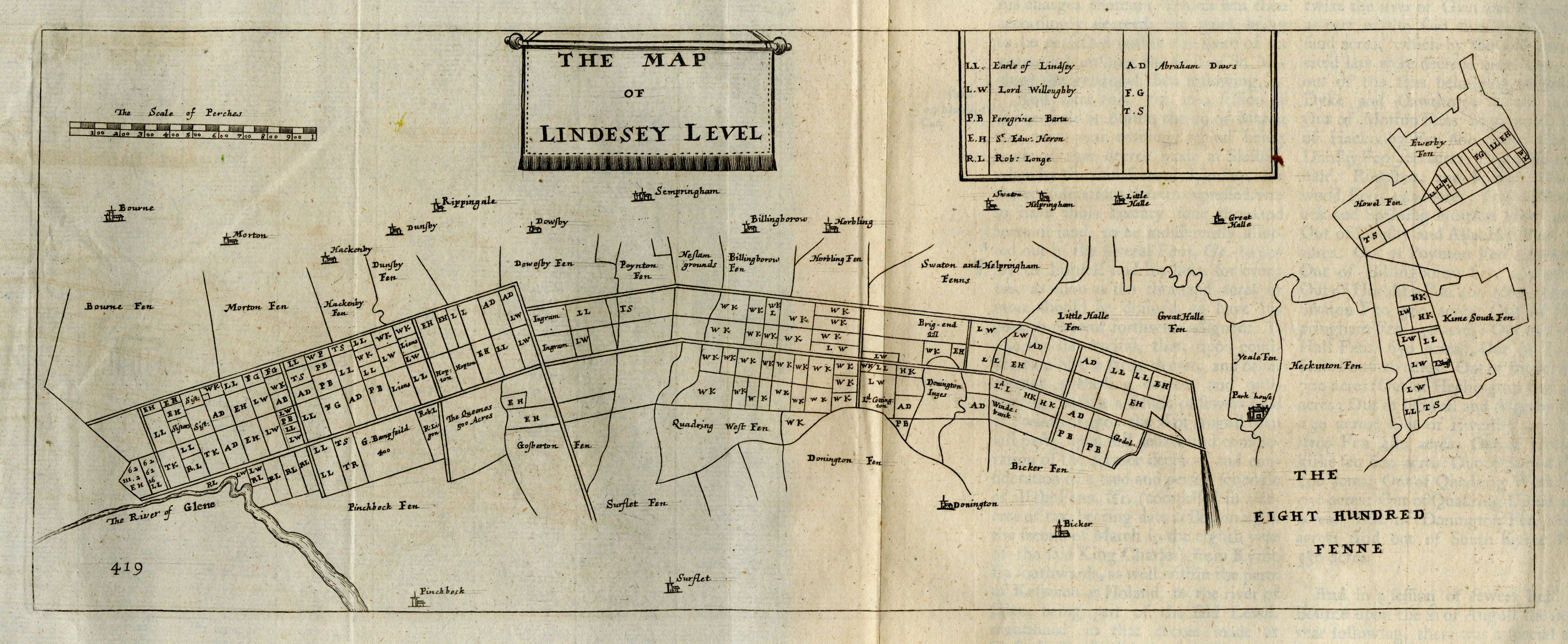
"The Map of Lindsey Levell" from "The history of imbanking and drayning" by William Dugdale (1662).

Lindsey was itself divided into three ridings: the North, West and South Ridings, which in turn were divided into wapentakes. The West Riding covered the western part, including Gainsborough, Scunthorpe and Spital. The North Riding covered the north-east, including Barton upon Humber, Caistor, Cleethorpes, Brigg, Grimsby and Market Rasen. The South Riding covered the rest, in the south-east, including Louth, Mablethorpe and Skegness. The point at which the Ridings all touched was somewhere near Lissington.

Lindsey, like the other parts of Lincolnshire, had long had a separate county administration (Quarter Sessions). In 1889, this division was followed in the establishment of the administrative county of Lincolnshire, Parts of Lindsey, which had an elected county council. Lincoln and Grimsby were independent county boroughs.

Within the rest of Lindsey there were various urban districts and rural districts, established by the Local Government Act 1894. The rural districts were Caistor, Gainsborough, Glanford Brigg, Grimsby, Horncastle, Isle of Axholme, Louth, Spilsby, Welton. A rural district of Sibsey also existed until 1936, when it was merged into Spilsby.

The administrative county of Parts of Lindsey was abolished on 1 April 1974 as a result of the Local Government Act 1972. Its area was divided between two new non-metropolitan counties: the northern area of Lindsey was placed in Humberside while the remainder passed to Lincolnshire. In 1996 the unpopular decision was all but reversed, in that Lincolnshire status was reinstated for the areas that had become South Humberside, however the Lindsey name was not.

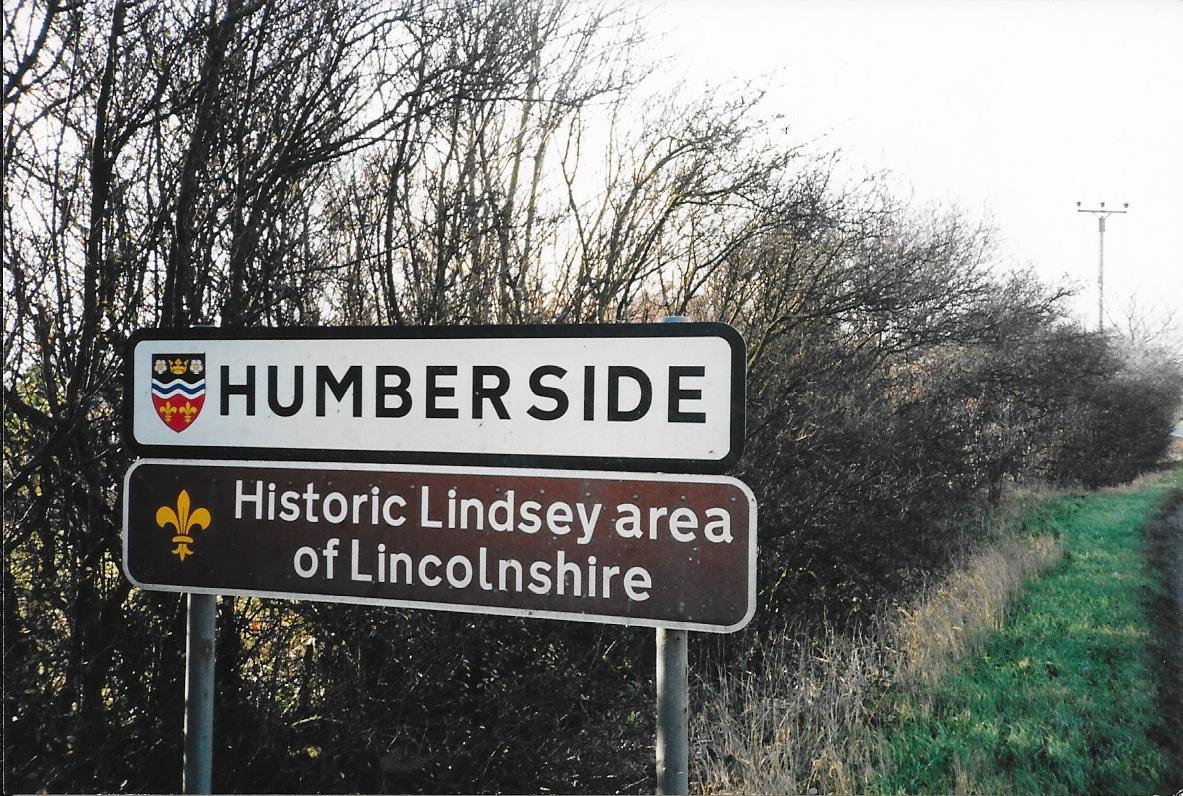
Roadsigns showing Humberside and Lindsey

Lindsey was divided between six non-metropolitan districts, as follows

District	Area
East Lindsey (Lincolnshire)	Rural districts of Horncastle, Louth and Spilsby; Urban districts of Louth, Alford, Horncastle, Mablethorpe and Sutton, Skegness and Woodhall Spa.
West Lindsey (Lincolnshire)	Rural districts of Caistor, Gainsborough, Welton; Urban districts of Gainsborough and Market Rasen
Cleethorpes (Humberside)	Rural district of Grimsby; Municipal Borough of Cleethorpes
Glanford (Humberside)	Rural district of Glanford Brigg; Urban districts of Barton and Brigg
Scunthorpe (Humberside)	Municipal Borough of Scunthorpe
Boothferry (Humberside)	Isle of Axholme Rural District; along with areas from the East and West Ridings of Yorkshire

=== Present authorities ===
In 1996 the Humberside districts were re-grouped into unitary authorities; units which performed the duties of both county and administrative district. One is North Lincolnshire (centred on Scunthorpe). This comprises the former districts of Glanford and Scunthorpe, as well as the Isle of Axholme which formed the southern part of Boothferry district. The second is North East Lincolnshire, comprising the former districts of Great Grimsby and Cleethorpes. The two unitary authorities represent the most urbanised part of traditional Lincolnshire.

The remaining parts of Lindsey largely correspond to the 1974 Lincolnshire County Council districts of West Lindsey and East Lindsey.
