= North Riding of Lindsey =

Coordinates: 53.5°N 0.3°W

The North Riding of Lindsey was a division of the Lindsey part of Lincolnshire in England. It consisted of the north-eastern part of the county, and included the Bradley-Haverstoe, Ludborough, Walshcroft and Yarborough wapentakes.
