= Thorganby, Lincolnshire =

Village and civil parish in the West Lindsey district of Lincolnshire

Coordinates: 53.461445°N 0.180309°W

Thorganby
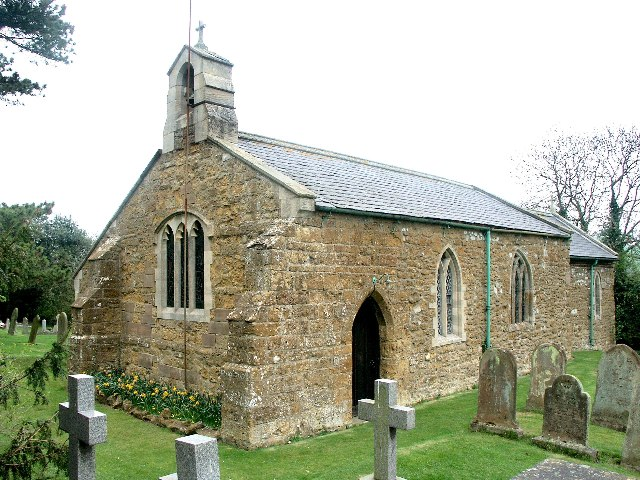
- All Saints' Church, Thorganby

- Location within Lincolnshire
- OS grid reference: TF209976
  - London: 140 mi (230 km) S
- District: West Lindsey
- Shire county: Lincolnshire
- Region: East Midlands
- Country: England
- Sovereign state: United Kingdom
- Post town: GRIMSBY
- Postcode district: DN37
- Police: Lincolnshire
- Fire: Lincolnshire
- Ambulance: East Midlands
- UK Parliament: Gainsborough

Thorganby is a village and civil parish in the West Lindsey district of Lincolnshire. England. It is situated approximately 9 miles (14 km) north-east from the town of Market Rasen in the Lincolnshire Wolds, a designated Area of Outstanding Natural Beauty. The population is included in the civil parish of Swinhope.

The parish church is a Grade II listed building dedicated to All Saints. Built using ironstone, limestone and red brick, It dates from the 13th century although it was almost completely rebuilt in 1900. It retains its 13th-century font.

Thorganby Hall is a Grade II listed small country house, built of limestone and red brick in 1648 with early 19th-century additions. It was built to replace an earlier Hall which was the seat of the Willoughby family, plundered by the Roundheads during the English Civil War in 1643.

Thorganby C of E School was built in 1868 as a National School. It closed in March 1959.
