= 2007 West Lindsey District Council election =

2007 UK local government election

Elections to West Lindsey District Council were held on 3 May 2007. One third of the council was up for election and the Liberal Democrat Party held overall control of the council after what was seen as a straight fight with the Conservative Party.

The election in Scotter ward was decided by the toss of a coin which the Conservative candidate won.

After the election, the composition of the council was:

- Liberal Democrat 20
- Conservative 16
- Independent 1

== Election result ==
West Lindsey local election result 2007
Party	Seats	Gains	Losses	Net gain/loss	Seats %	Votes %	Votes	+/−
Conservative	6	1	2	-1	50.0	47.8	6,429	+1.5%
Liberal Democrats	5	2	1	+1	41.7	44.6	5,997	-2.5%
Independent	1	0	0	0	8.3	2.0	263	+1.2%
UKIP	0	0	0	0	0	2.5	333	-1.8%
BNP	0	0	0	0	0	1.7	225	+1.7%
Labour	0	0	0	0	0	1.4	191	-0.1%

One Independent candidate was unopposed.

== Ward results ==
Caistor
Party	Candidate	Votes	%	±%
Independent	Alan Caine	unopposed		
Independent hold		Swing		

Gainsborough East
Party	Candidate	Votes	%	±%
Liberal Democrats	Kristan Smith	716	70.3	+3.3
Conservative	Paul Howitt-Cowan	303	29.7	−3.3
Majority		414	40.6	+6.6
Turnout		1,019	21.0	−2.7
Liberal Democrats hold		Swing		

Gainsborough North
Party	Candidate	Votes	%	±%
Liberal Democrats	Pat O'Connor	668	46.7	−20.4
Conservative	Gillian Bardsley	499	34.9	+10.0
Independent	Stuart Morley	202	14.1	+14.1
UKIP	Gordon Simmonds	60	4.2	+4.2
Majority		169	11.8	−30.4
Turnout		1,429	28.9	+4.5
Liberal Democrats gain from Conservative		Swing		

Gainsborough South-West
Party	Candidate	Votes	%	±%
Liberal Democrats	Judy Rainsforth	665	74.4	+16.4
Conservative	Alan Beverley	168	18.8	+0.2
Independent	Mike Parker	61	6.8	−1.7
Majority		497	55.6	+16.2
Turnout		894	24.6	−11.1
Liberal Democrats hold		Swing		

Kelsey
Party	Candidate	Votes	%	±%
Conservative	Lewis Strange	808	84.3	
Liberal Democrats	Neil Taylor	110	11.5	
UKIP	Steven Pearson	41	4.3	
Majority		698	72.8	
Turnout		959	46.8	
Conservative hold		Swing		

Lea
Party	Candidate	Votes	%	±%
Conservative	Jessie Milne	525	56.0	+37.2
Liberal Democrats	Ian Parsons	412	44.0	+9.9
Majority		113	12.0	
Turnout		937	52.4	+8.1
Conservative gain from Liberal Democrats		Swing		

Middle Rasen
Party	Candidate	Votes	%	±%
Liberal Democrats	Gary Fenwick	534	49.9	−4.7
Conservative	Geoffrey Wiseman	425	39.7	+8.9
UKIP	Dave Ranby	111	10.4	+10.4
Majority		109	10.2	−13.6
Turnout		1,070	47.5	+2.7
Liberal Democrats hold		Swing		

Saxilby
Party	Candidate	Votes	%	±%
Liberal Democrats	Jackie Brockway	934	54.0	−22.8
Conservative	Giles McNeill	709	41.0	+17.8
UKIP	Tony Wells	86	5.0	+5.0
Majority		225	13.0	−40.6
Turnout		1,729	42.0	−8.9
Liberal Democrats gain from Conservative		Swing		

Scotter
Party	Candidate	Votes	%	±%
Conservative	Christopher Underwood-Frost	781	50.0	−4.2
Liberal Democrats	John Burtenshaw	781	50.0	+4.2
Majority		0	0	−8.4
Turnout		1,562	42.1	−4.0
Conservative hold		Swing		

Torksey
Party	Candidate	Votes	%	±%
Conservative	Stuart Kinch	594	53.6	−7.8
Liberal Democrats	Sue Bartle	289	26.1	−12.5
BNP	Malcolm Porter	225	20.3	+20.3
Majority		305	27.5	+4.7
Turnout		1,108	48.8	+0.4
Conservative hold		Swing		

Welton
Party	Candidate	Votes	%	±%
Conservative	Malcolm Parish	995	52.8	+10.1
Liberal Democrats	Marlene Chapman	888	47.2	−10.1
Majority		107	5.6	−9.0
Turnout		1,883	43.7	−9.2
Conservative hold		Swing		

Yarborough
Party	Candidate	Votes	%	±%
Conservative	Owen Bierley	622	73.3	+12.2
Labour	John Indian	191	22.5	−16.4
UKIP	Carol Pearson	35	4.1	+4.1
Majority		431	50.8	+28.6
Turnout		848	44.1	−4.0
Conservative hold		Swing		
