= West Lindsey =

Coordinates: 53.35°N 0.60°W

- District
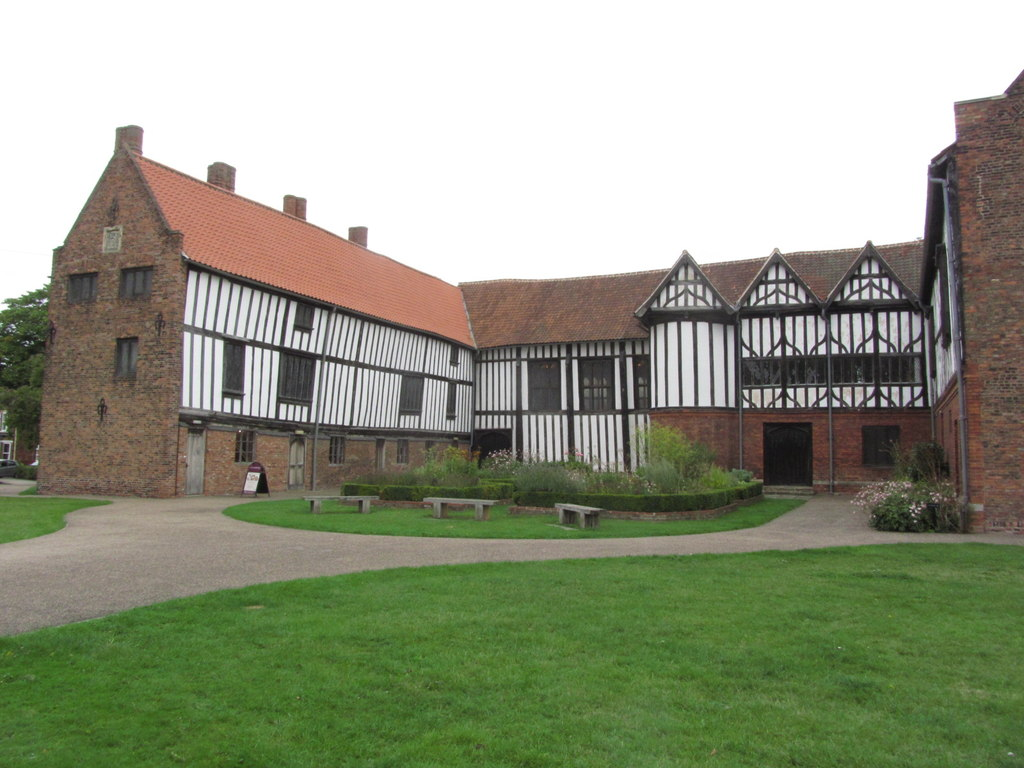
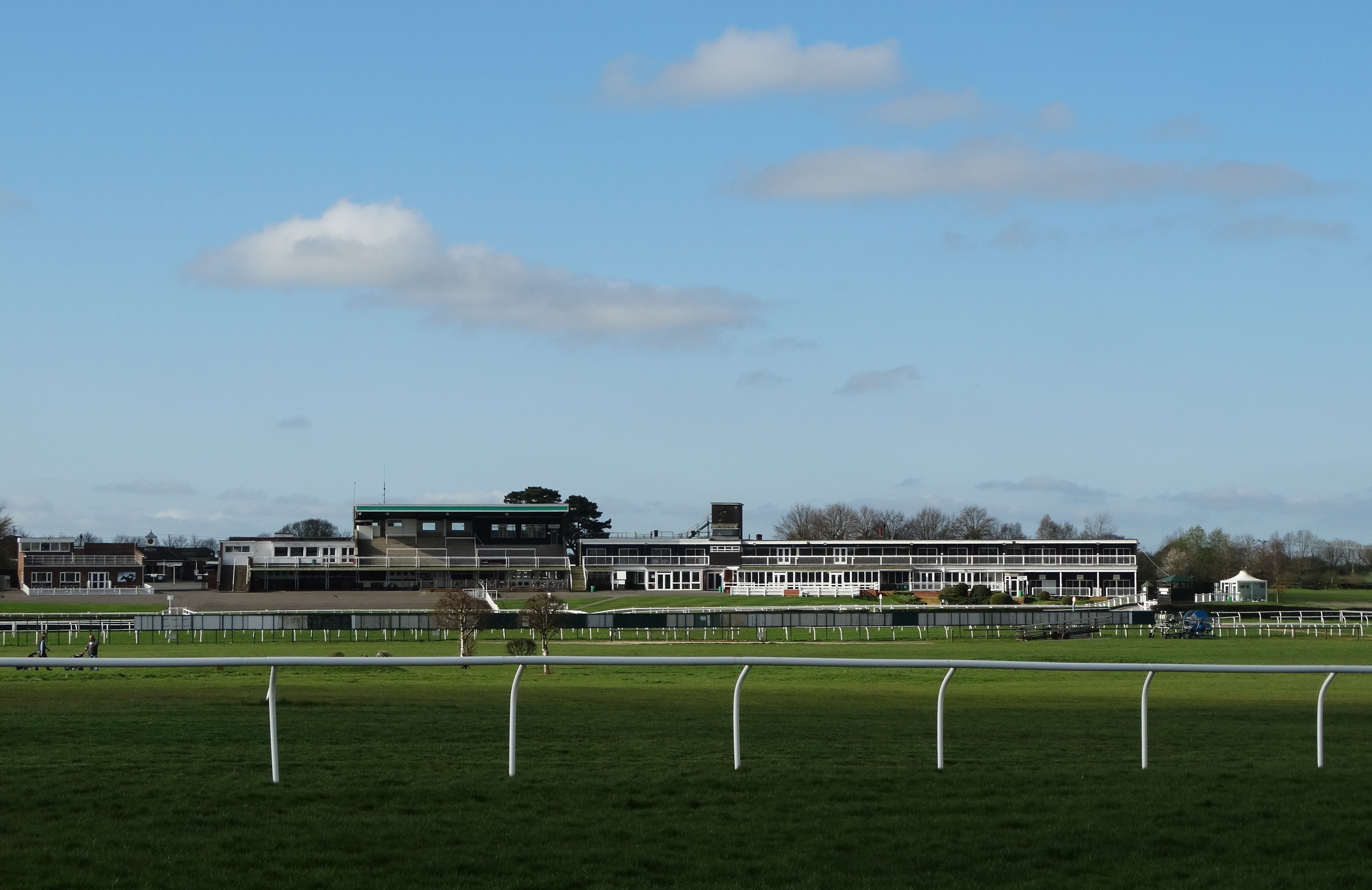
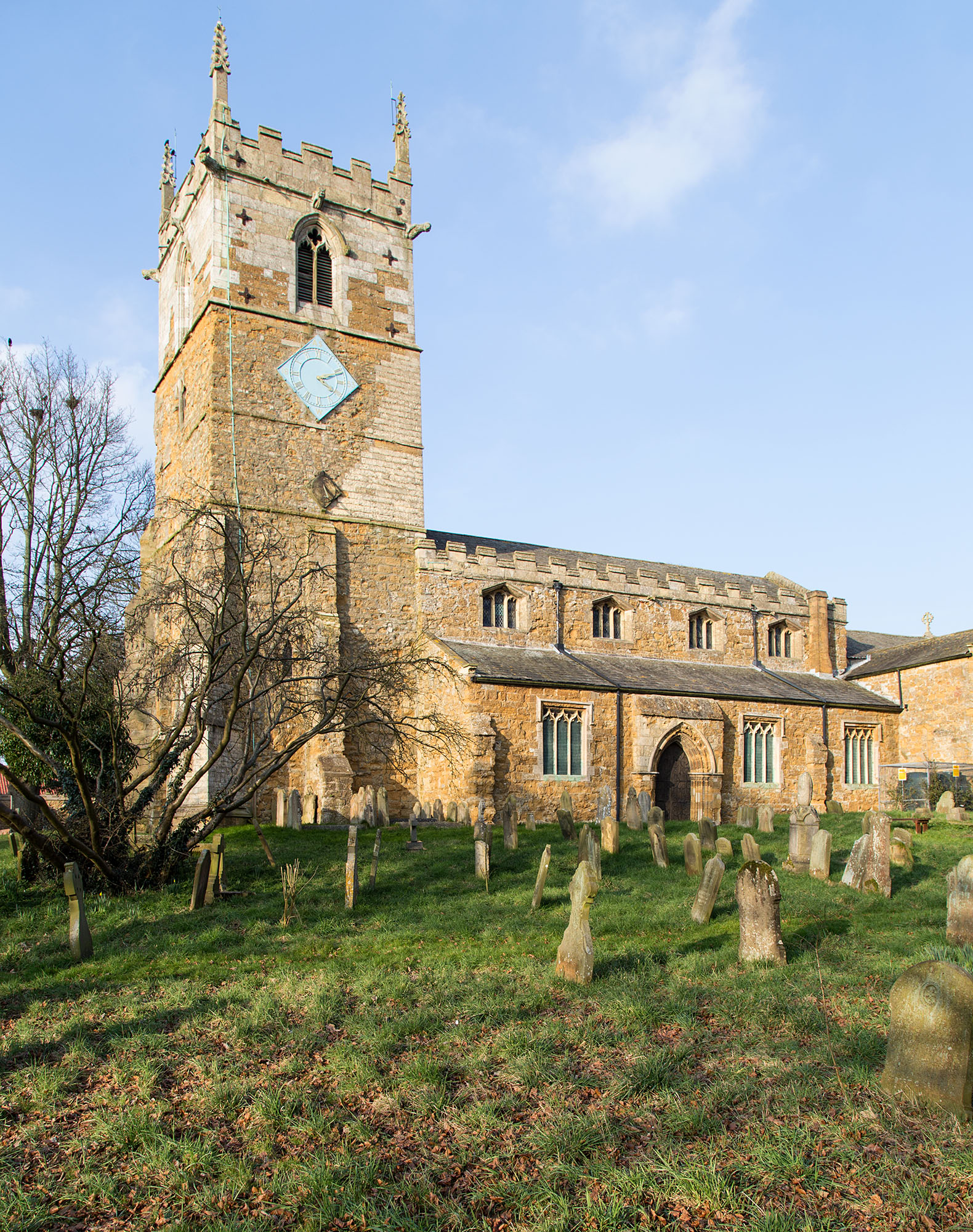
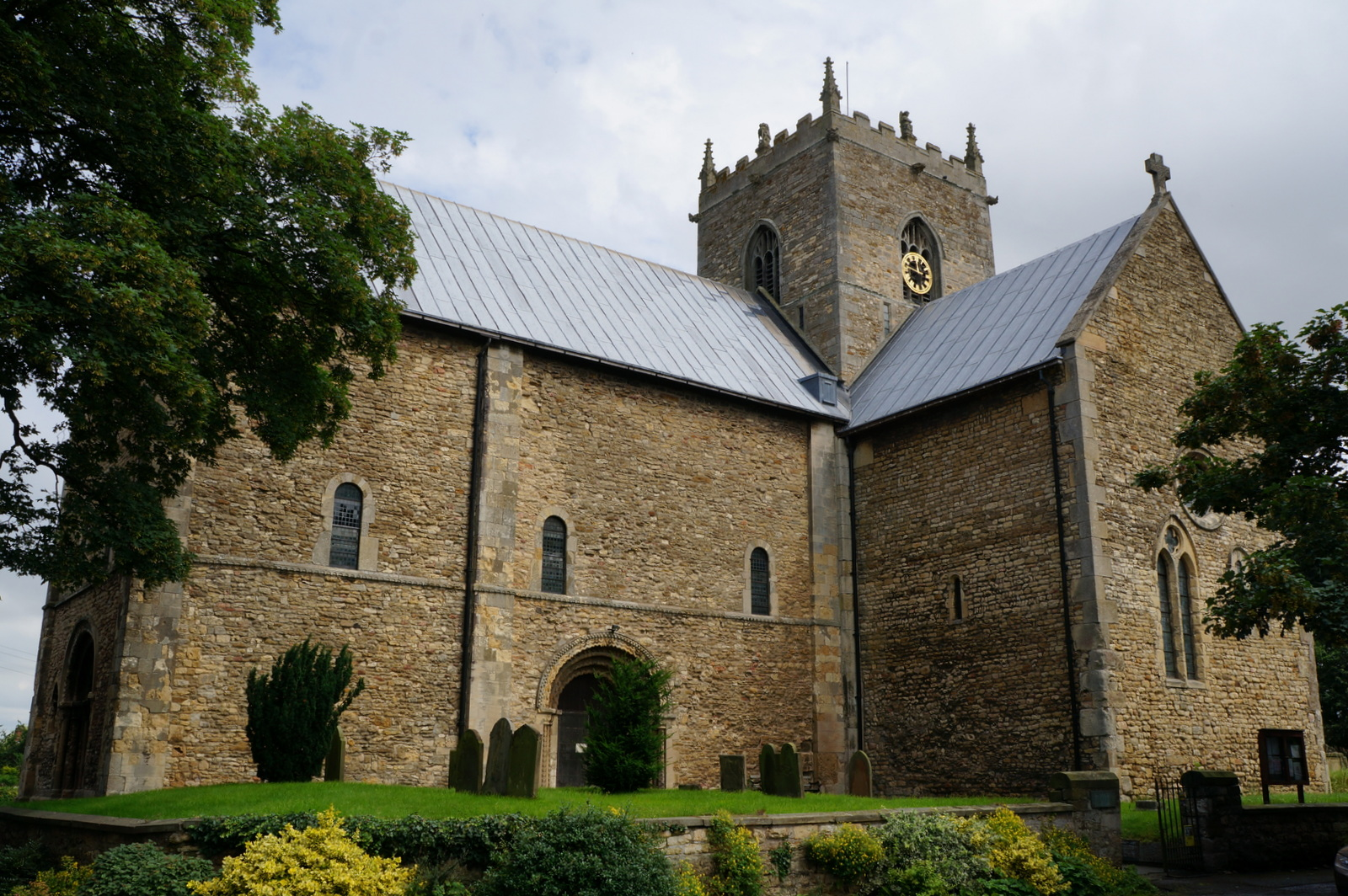
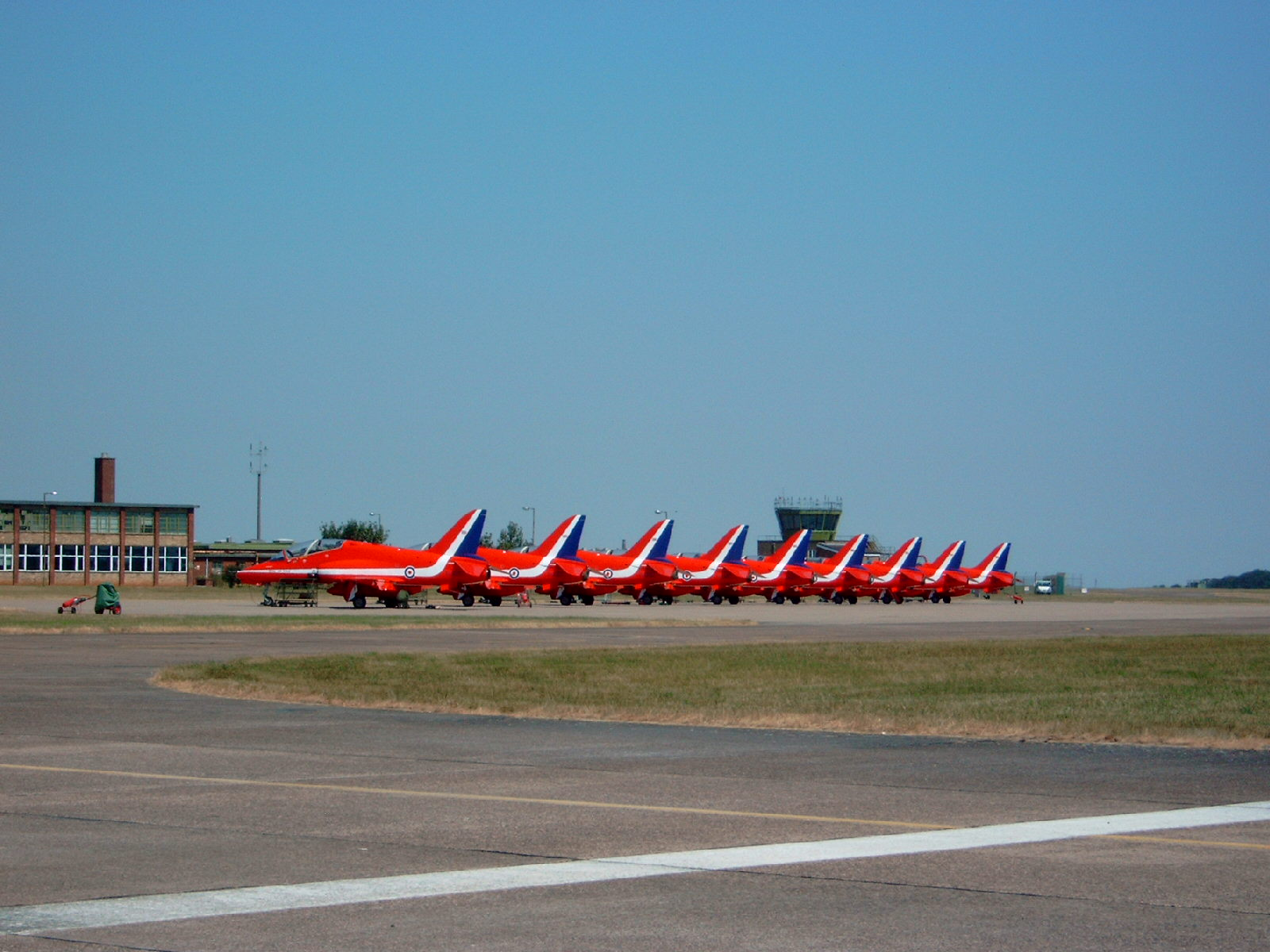
- From left to right; Top: Gainsborough Old Hall; Middle: Market Rasen Racecourse and Caistor parish church; Bottom:Stow Minster and the Red Arrows at RAF Scampton (now closed)

- Shown within the ceremonial county of Lincolnshire
- Sovereign state: United Kingdom
- Constituent country: England
- Region: East Midlands
- Ceremonial county: Lincolnshire
- Admin. HQ: Gainsborough

Government
  - MPs: Edward Leigh

Area
  - Total: 446 sq mi (1,156 km^{2})
  - Rank: 22nd

Population (2024)
  - Total: 99,208
  - Rank: Ranked 252nd
  - Density: 222.3/sq mi (85.82/km^{2})

Ethnicity (2021)
  - Ethnic groups: List: 97% White; 1.2% Asian; 1.1% Mixed; 0.4% other; 0.3% Black

Religion (2021)
  - Religion: List: 58% Christianity; 40.2% no religion; 0.4% Islam; 1.4% other
- Time zone: UTC+0 (Greenwich Mean Time)
  - Summer (DST): UTC+1 (British Summer Time)
- ONS code: 32UH (ONS); E07000142 (GSS)

West Lindsey is a local government district in Lincolnshire, England. Its council is based in Gainsborough, the district's largest town. The district also includes the towns of Caistor and Market Rasen, along with numerous villages and surrounding rural areas. The east of the district includes part of the Lincolnshire Wolds, a designated Area of Outstanding Natural Beauty.

The neighbouring districts are North Lincolnshire, North East Lincolnshire, East Lindsey, North Kesteven, Lincoln, Newark and Sherwood and Bassetlaw.

== History ==
The district was created on 1 April 1974 under the Local Government Act 1972, covering five former districts which were all abolished at the same time:

- Caistor Rural District
- Gainsborough Rural District
- Gainsborough Urban District
- Market Rasen Urban District
- Welton Rural District

The new district was named West Lindsey, reflecting its position within Lindsey, one of the three historic Parts of Lincolnshire, which had been an administrative county between 1889 and 1974.

Under current local government reorganisation plans, all district councils in Lincolnshire, as well as the county council, will be abolished in 2028, with the district being split between new Lincoln and Lincolnshire unitary authorities.

== Governance ==
West Lindsey District Council

Type
- Type: Non-metropolitan district

Leadership
- Chair: Matthew Boles, Liberal Democrat since 12 May 2025
- Leader: Jackie Brockway, Conservative since 8 September 2026
- Chief Executive: Paul Burkinshaw since 2025

Structure
- Seats: 36 councillors
- Graph of the party split among 32 seats.
- Political groups: Administration (28) Conservative (13) Liberal Democrats (9) Independent (3) Lincolnshire Ind. (2) Reform (1) Other parties (8) Liberal Democrats (5) Independent (3)

Elections
- Last election: 4 May 2023
- Next election: 6 May 2027

Meeting place
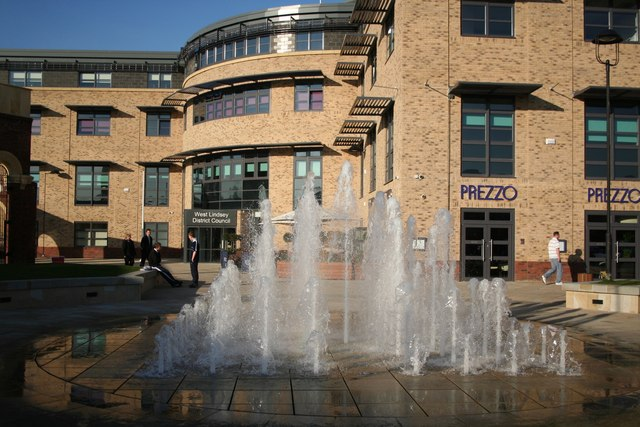
- Guildhall, Marshall's Yard, Gainsborough, DN21 2NA

Website
- www.west-lindsey.gov.uk

West Lindsey District Council provides district-level services. County-level services are provided by Lincolnshire County Council. The whole district is also covered by civil parishes, which form a third tier of local government.

=== Political control ===
The council has been under no overall control since 2021. Following the 2023 election the Liberal Democrats had exactly half the seats on the council, and managed to form an administration with the support of one of the independent councillors. The Liberal Democrat-led administration was voted out of office in July 2025. A new administration group subsequently formed, comprising the Conservatives, Lincolnshire Independents, Reform UK and some of the Liberal Democrats and independent councillors, led by Conservative councillor Jackie Brockway, who was formally appointed as leader of the council on 8 September 2025.

The first election to the council was held in 1973, initially operating as a shadow authority alongside the outgoing authorities until the new arrangements took effect on 1 April 1974. Political control of the council since 1974 has been as follows:

Party in control	Years
Independent	1974–1979
No overall control	1979–1987
Liberal Democrats	1987–1988
No overall control	1988–1996
Liberal Democrats	1996–1998
No overall control	1998–2004
Conservative	2004–2006
Liberal Democrats	2006–2008
Conservative	2008–2021
No overall control	2021–present

=== Leadership ===
The leaders of the council since 2004 have been:

Councillor	Party	From	To
Bernard Theobald	Conservative	28 Jun 2004	2009
Adam Duguid	Conservative	2009	2010
Burt Keimach	Conservative	2010	20 May 2013
Jeff Summers	Conservative	20 May 2013	20 May 2019
Giles McNeill	Conservative	20 May 2019	2 Nov 2020
Owen Bierley	Conservative	2 Nov 2020	May 2023
Trevor Young	Liberal Democrats	22 May 2023	7 Jul 2025
Jackie Brockway	Conservative	8 Sep 2025	

=== Composition ===
Following the 2023 election, and subsequent changes of allegiance up to June 2026, the composition of the council was:

Party	Seats
Liberal Democrats	14
Conservative	13
Lincolnshire Independent	2
Reform	1
Independent	6
Total	36

The council is run by the "Administration Group", which comprises the Conservatives, Lincolnshire Independents, Reform, nine of the fourteen Liberal Democrats, and three of the independent councillors. The other five Liberal Democrats do not sit in the administration group, but form a separate group with one of the other independent councillors. The other two independent councillors form the "Community Independents Group". The next election is due in 2027.

=== Elections ===
Since the last boundary changes in 2015 the council has comprised 36 councillors representing 20 wards, with each ward electing one, two or three councillors. Elections are held every four years.

In the 2016 EU referendum, West Lindsey voted 61.8% leave (33,847 votes) to 38.2% remain (20,906 votes).

=== Premises ===
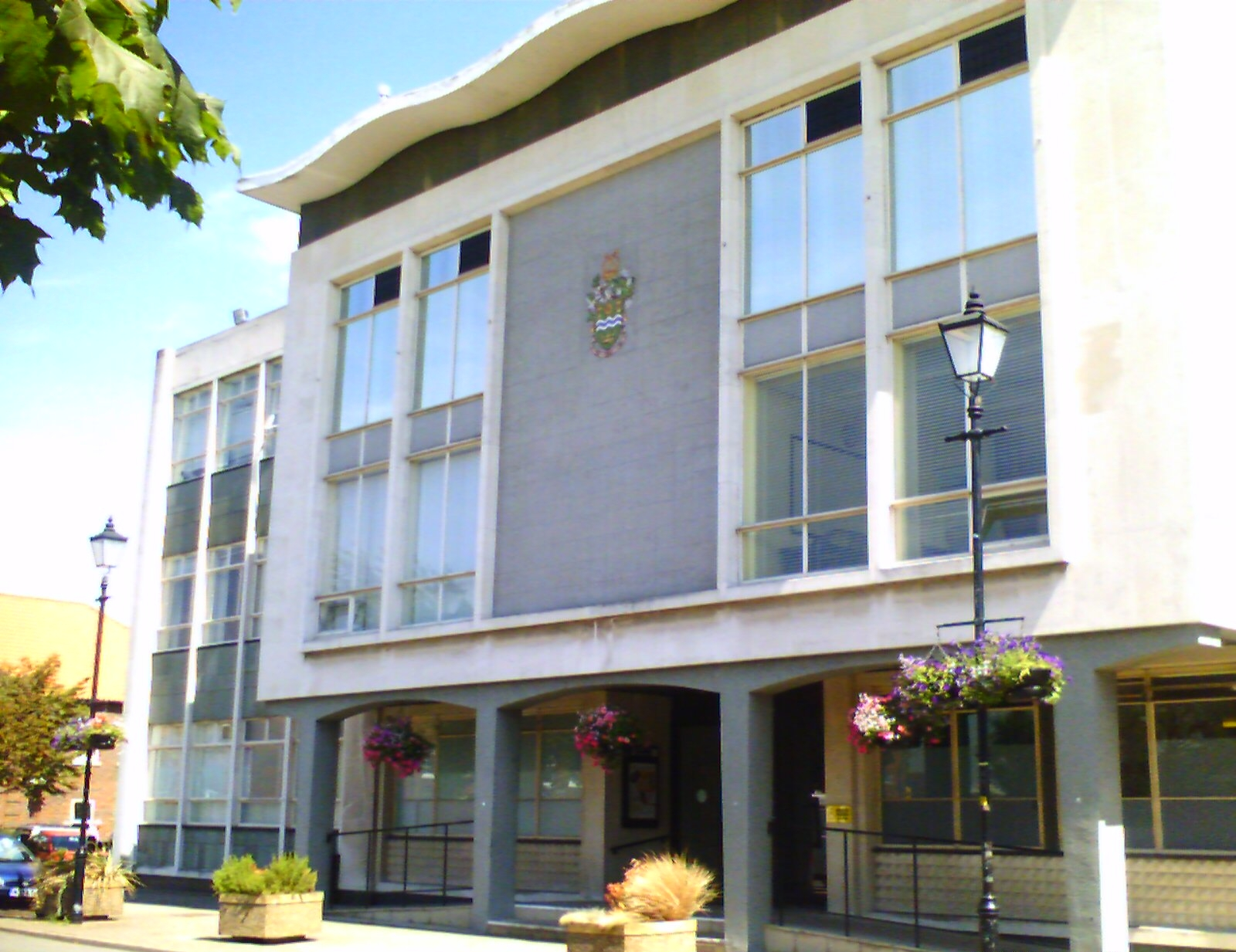
Old Guildhall, Caskgate Street, Gainsborough: Council's headquarters until 2008, since demolished.

The council is based at the Guildhall in Marshall's Yard in Gainsborough, which is a modern office building within a retail development. The council moved there in 2008 from its former headquarters, also called the Guildhall, on Caskgate Street in Gainsborough. The old Guildhall had been built in 1966 for the former Gainsborough Urban District Council, one of the council's predecessors. It has since been demolished.

== Geography ==
West Lindsey borders North Lincolnshire and North East Lincolnshire to the north, East Lindsey to the east, North Kesteven and the city of Lincoln to the south, and the county of Nottinghamshire to the west.

The boundary of the district in the west borders the River Trent, and meets Nottinghamshire (Bassetlaw) and North Lincolnshire at East Stockwith, close to Wildsworth. On the other side of the Trent is Gunthorpe, Lincolnshire. It deviates from the Trent, to the east along the River Eau at Scotter, where it meets Messingham in North Lincolnshire. The boundary deviates southwards near Scotton, then at Northorpe follows the B1205 eastwards, crossing the A15 at Waddingham. It follows the Sallowrow Drain to the Old River Ancholme at South Kelsey, which it follows northwards. At North Kelsey, it deviates from the Old River Ancholme, following the North Kelsey Beck eastwards. This crosses the B1434 then the Newark-Grimsby railway line, where at Searby cum Owmby it follows a drain parallel to the railway line northwards, and at Bigby it follows Kettleby Beck westwards across the railway line back to the Old River Ancholme, which it follows for almost a mile towards Brigg. The Bigby parish is the northern part of West Lindsey that skirts the southern edge of Brigg, crossing the A1084 and the railway line.

Also in Bigby, it crosses the Scunthorpe-Grimsby line, then three railway lines together at Wrawby Junction. North of Bigby village it crosses the western escarpment of the northern Lincolnshire Wolds, then skirts the southern and eastern perimeter of Humberside Airport. It crosses the A18 and B1210, then the B1211. The furthest north section of the district, and of the county, is where it meets a short section of the A180, where a few hundred metres west of the A160 interchange it meets North East Lincolnshire. It follows the New Beck Drain south-east across the B1210, and at Riby, the A1173 and A18. At Swallow it crosses the A46. It follows the Waithe Beck at Thorganby. At Swinhope it meets East Lindsey, next to Scallows Hall (in East Lindsey), and crosses the B1203, then again at Kirmond le Mire. It meets the B1225 High Street at Tealby, and for around two miles southwards is the district boundary, crossing the A631 at North Willingham. At Sixhills it deviates westwards from the B1225, next to the former RAF Ludford Magna (in East Lindsey). At Holton cum Beckering it crosses the B1202, then the A158 at Goltho, where it skirts the western edge of Wragby (in East Lindsey). It passes southwards in Bardney through Chamber's Farm Wood (mostly in East Lindsey); Chamber's Farm itself is in West Lindsey. It skirts the southern edge of the former RAF Bardney, and crosses the B1190 near Tupholme Abbey (in East Lindsey). East of Southrey (also in Bardney parish) it meets the River Witham and North Kesteven. It follows the River Witham westwards until Greetwell where it meets the City of Lincoln, deviates northwards, crossing the Lincoln - Market Rasen railway line. It follows the outskirts of Lincoln, crossing the B1182 (former A46) at Nettleham. It crosses the A15 north of the Riseholme roundabout, and follows a short section of the A57, then crosses it, near Bishop Bridge. A few hundred metres west it meets the Foss Dyke, which from there a mile north-west is the boundary with North Kesteven. At Saxilby with Ingleby it deviates westwards from the Foss Dyke, and at Broadholme (former Nottinghamshire until 1989) at the B1190 (Tom Otters Lane), it meets Nottinghamshire (Newark and Sherwood). It follows a half-mile section of Ox Pasture Drain north to the A57, which it briefly follows westwards until Kettlethorpe (A156 junction). It crosses the A1133 at Newton on Trent, and under a mile westwards it meets the River Trent and Bassetlaw, a mile north of the former High Marnham Power Station.

=== Towns and parishes ===
Notable Towns and Villages of West Lindsey

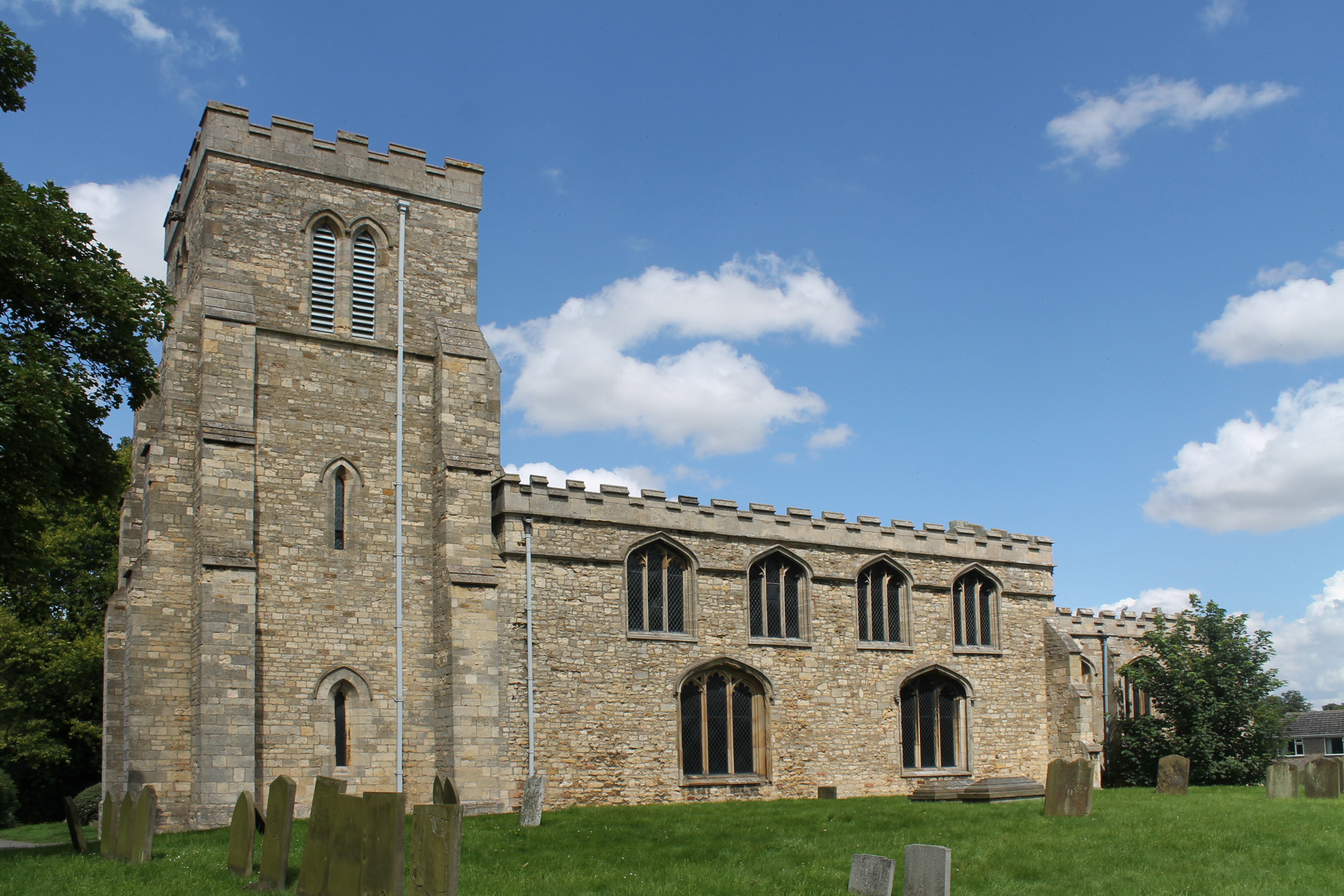
Saxilby

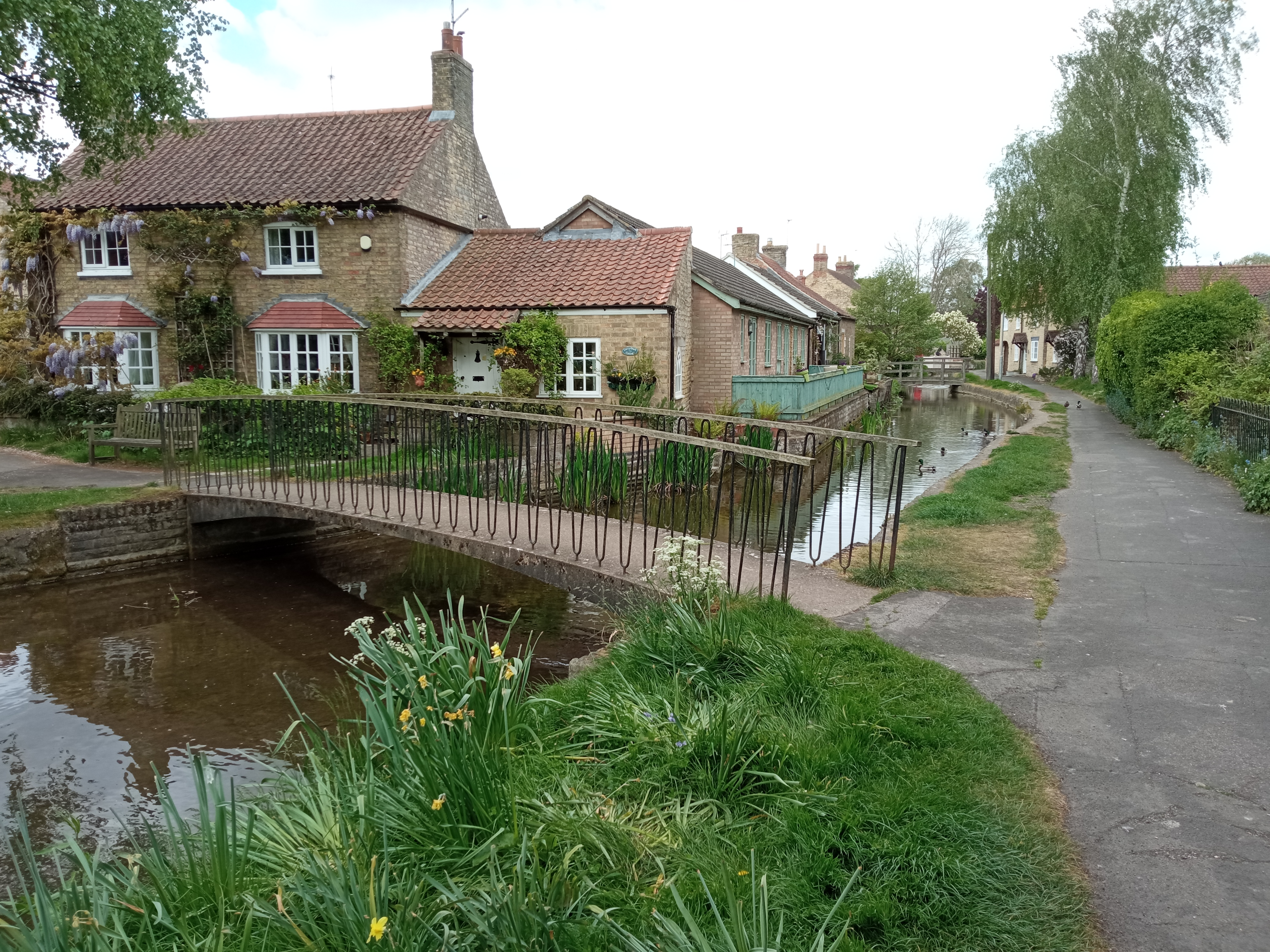
Nettleham

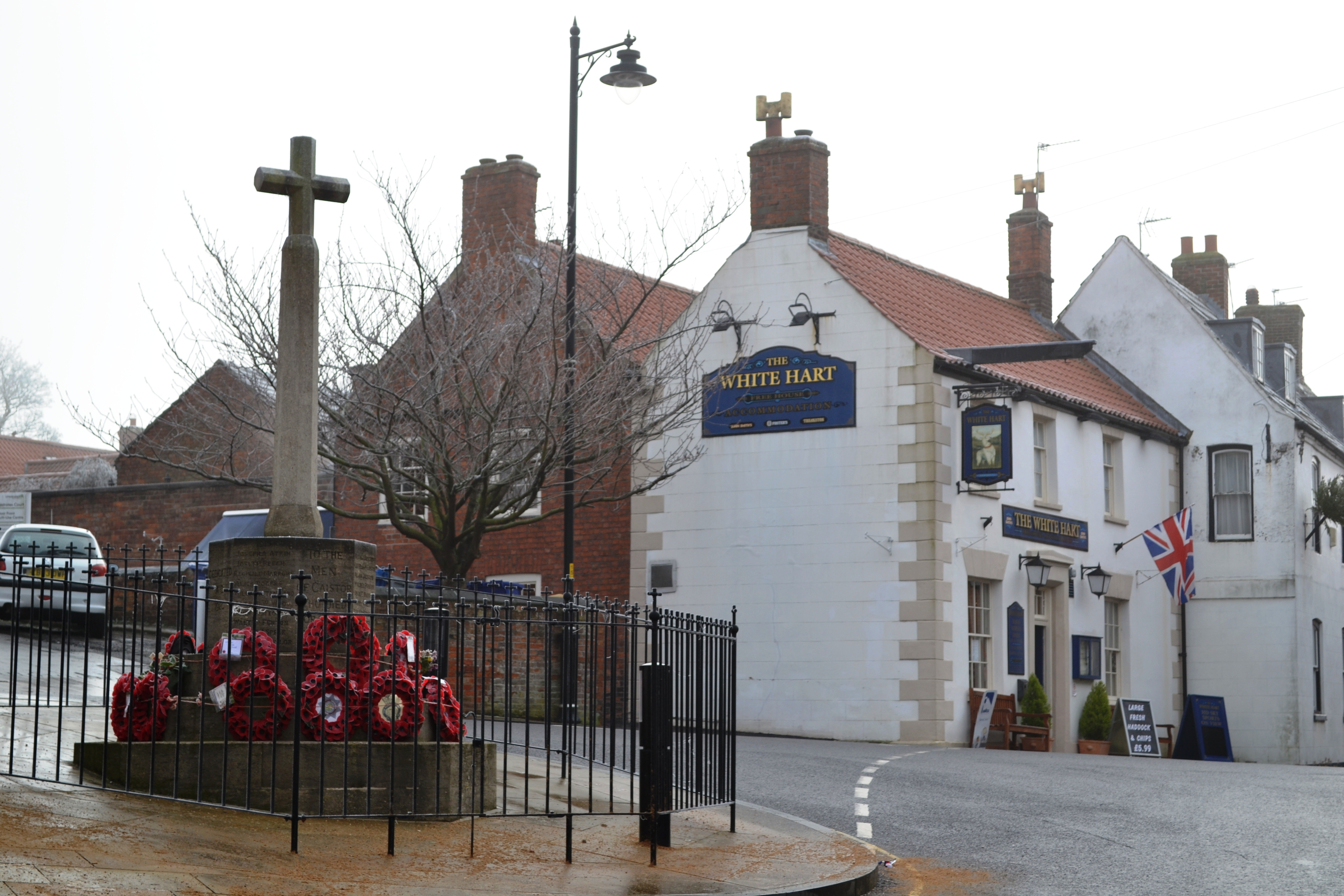
Caistor

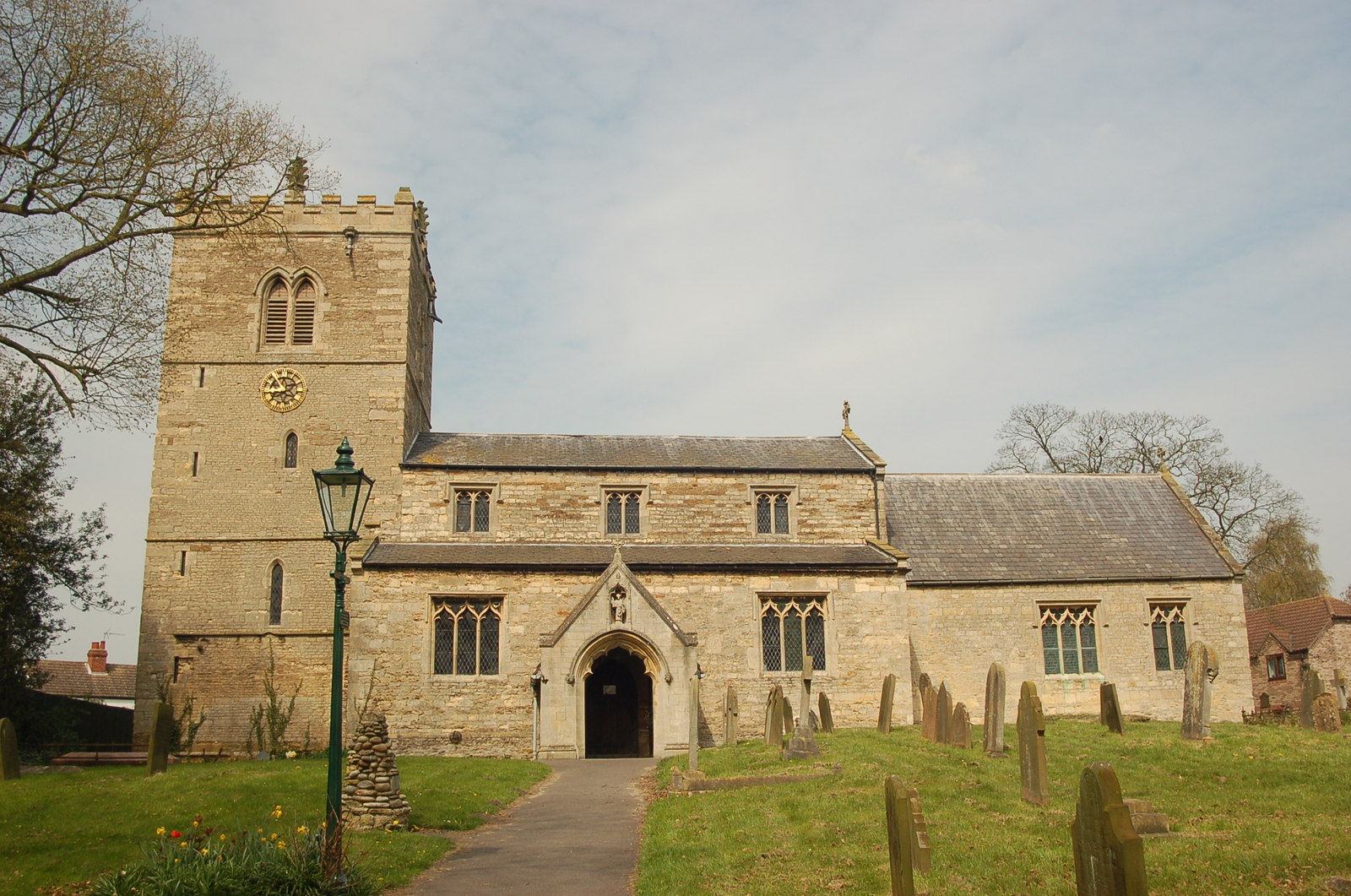
Dunholme

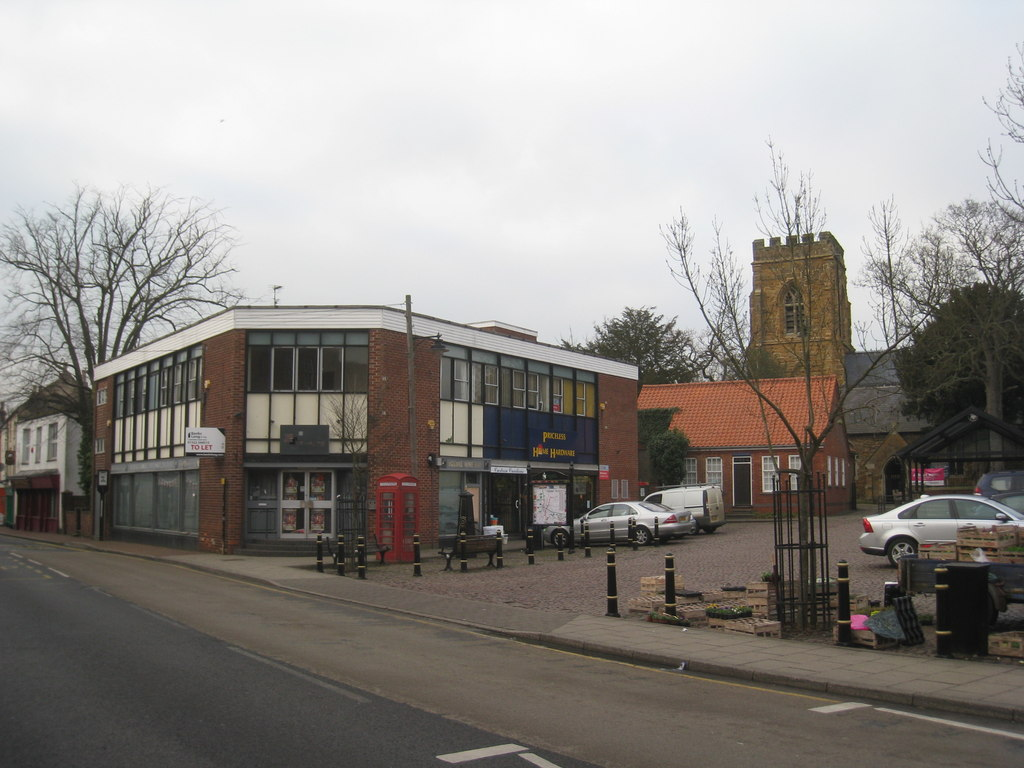
Market Rasen

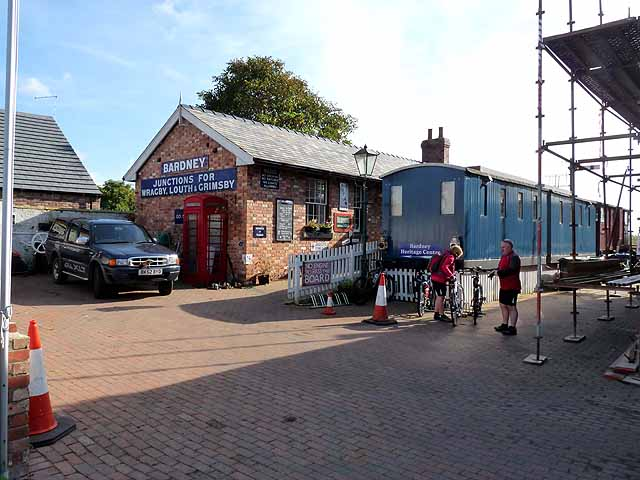
Bardney

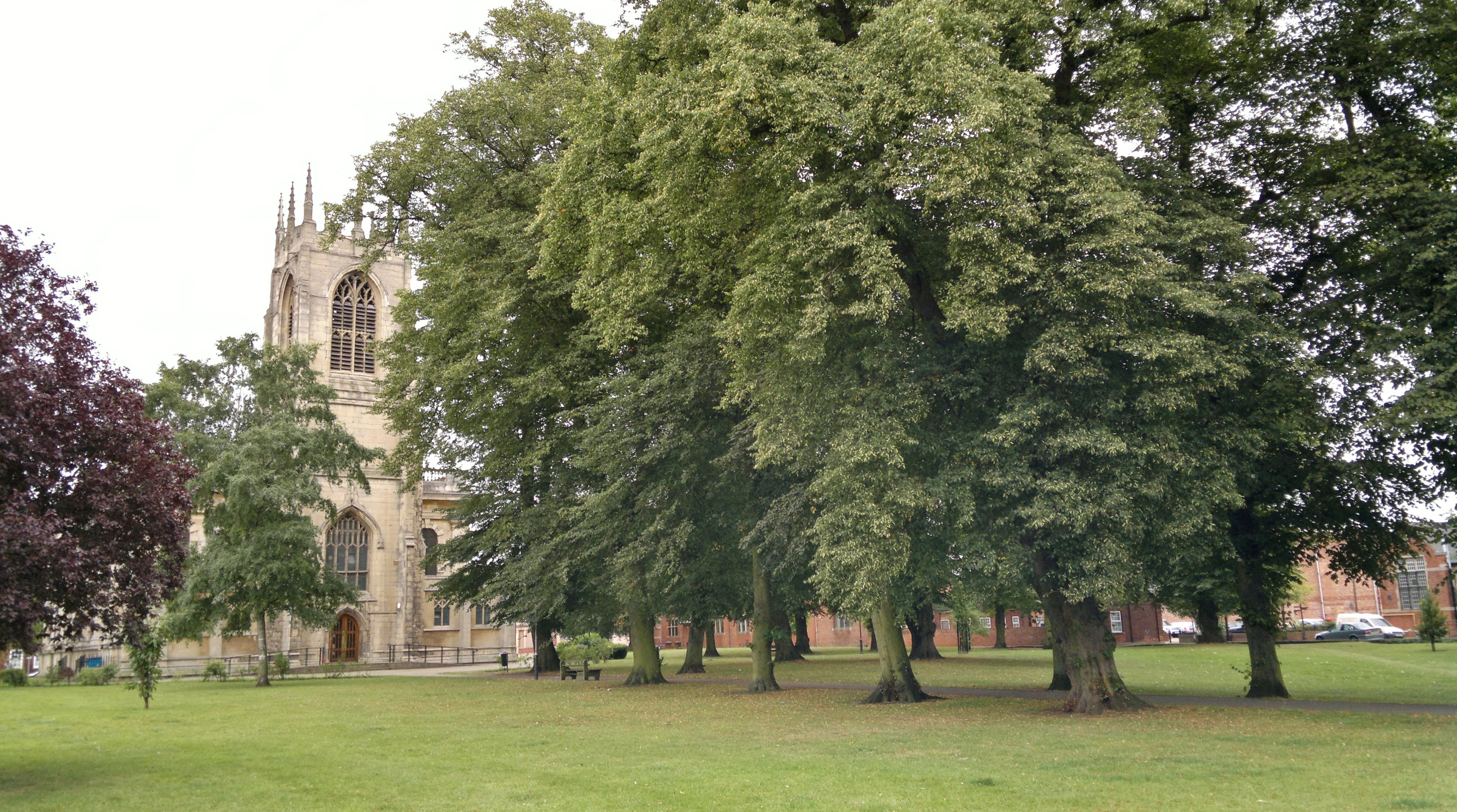
Gainsborough

It covers Gainsborough, Market Rasen, Sudbrooke, Fiskerton, Reepham, Cherry Willingham, Nettleham, Welton, Caistor, and Keelby.

The whole district is divided into civil parishes. The parish councils for Caistor, Market Rasen and Gainsborough have declared their parishes to be towns, allowing them to take the style "town council". Many of the smaller parishes have a parish meeting rather than a parish council.

== Education ==
The district, similar to North and South Kesteven, has a mixture of comprehensive schools in the south-east of the district and selective schools in Gainsborough (Queen Elizabeth's High School, The Gainsborough Academy) and Caistor. Both grammar schools are in the top ten for A level results in the East Midlands, with Caistor Grammar School getting the best results in this region consistently year on year. It also gets some of the best results in England. These schools offer a standard of state education from ages 11–16 not available in the regions of Lincolnshire directly north of the district (former Lindsey before 1974). Pupils from outside of the district may travel to be educated in Gainsborough from Scunthorpe (12–15 miles via the A159), and (in greater number) to Caistor from Grimsby and Cleethorpes (10–12 miles via the A46). The situation is reversed in the sixth form, with Lincolnshire pupils studying at the John Leggott College in Scunthorpe and the Franklin College, Grimsby. The best comprehensive in this district (and the county) is the William Farr School in Welton, which gets A level results similar to a grammar school.

== Transport ==
Large parts of the district can be accessed from the M180, to the north of the region. The A1500 (Tillbridge Lane) and A631 are the main east–west routes, and avoid busy town centres. The A631, further west, allows passage (through Bassetlaw) to Doncaster Sheffield Airport in the nearby Metropolitan Borough of Doncaster. The north–south route is the A15, officially the straightest road in the UK, following the Roman road Ermine Street.

== Media ==
In terms of television, West Lindsey is served by BBC Yorkshire and Lincolnshire and ITV Yorkshire (East) broadcasting from the Belmont transmitter which situated near Market Rasen. However, western parts of the district such as Gainsborough can also receive BBC Yorkshire and ITV Yorkshire (West) from the Emley Moor TV transmitter near Huddersfield in West Yorkshire.

Radio stations for the area are:

- BBC Radio Lincolnshire
- Hits Radio Lincolnshire
- Greatest Hits Radio Lincolnshire
- Trentside Radio (serving Gainsborough)

The Lincolnshire Echo is the regional newspaper covering West Lindsey. Publications with a focus on a particular area within the district include the Gainsborough Standard and the Market Rasen Mail.

== Tourism ==
Attractions to the district include the Lincolnshire Wolds. The Lincolnshire Show is held in the district at the Lincolnshire Showground, south of the former RAF Scampton, which was previously the home for the Red Arrows, the Royal Air Force Aerobatic Team.

== Demographics ==
Historical population
Year	Pop.	±% p.a.
1981	77,700	—
1991	76,500	−0.16%
2001	79,513	+0.39%
2011	89,250	+1.16%
2015	92,812	+0.98%
2021	95,200	+0.42%

The district has seen steady population growth since 2001, with Gainsborough and the villages north of Lincoln particular points of growth. The population of the district now stands at 95,200 as of 2021.

The district ranked 161 out of 326 local authorities for amounts of deprivation. Part of the Gainsborough South West ward is in the top 5% for deprived areas (Super Output Area) in the country. Gainsborough East and Gainsborough South West wards have the highest levels of unemployment, although the region as a whole has a below-average rate.

16% of employment is in manufacturing, and 6% in agriculture. There are around 3,220 businesses. There are few council houses and house prices are lower than the regional average.

== Arms ==
Coat of arms of West Lindsey

Notes
Granted 15 November 1974
Crest
On a wreath Argent and Vert on a mount an oak tree Proper fructed Or bound thereto by a circular steel chain Proper two anchors in saltire Or.
Escutcheon
Vert a fess Ermine of five spots between in chief the head of a Roman legionary standard between two garbs of barley Or and in base on water barry wavy of four Argent and Azure a Viking ship Or the sail set Argent.
Supporters
On the dexter side a Lincolnshire Red Shorthorn Bull and on the sinister side a Lincoln Longwool Ram both guardant Proper each supporting a crosier Or.
Motto
Strive For The Gain Of All
