= RAF Wickenby =

Former Royal Air Force station in Lincolnshire, England

RAF Wickenby
- Holton cum Beckering, Lincolnshire in England

Site information
- Type: Satellite station
- Code: UI
- Owner: Air Ministry
- Operator: Royal Air Force
- Controlled by: RAF Bomber Command * No. 1 Group RAF

Location
- Shown within Lincolnshire RAF Wickenby (the United Kingdom)
- Coordinates: 53°19′01″N 000°20′56″W

Site history
- Built: 1941/42
- Built by: John Laing & Son Ltd
- In use: September 1942 – 1956
- Battles/wars: European theatre of World War II

Airfield information
- Identifiers: ICAO: EGNW
- Elevation: 25 metres (82 ft) AMSL
Runways
Direction	Length and surface
09/27	1,830 metres (6,004 ft) Concrete
03/21	530 metres (1,739 ft) Concrete
16/34	497 metres (1,631 ft) Concrete

Royal Air Force Wickenby, or more simply RAF Wickenby, was a purpose-built Royal Air Force satellite station constructed late 1942 and early 1943. It lies halfway between Wickenby and Holton cum Beckering, to the south-east of Wickenby close to the B1399 in West Lindsey, 8 NM (15 km; 9.2 mi) north-east of Lincoln, England.

Following closure, the airfield has become the civilian Wickenby Aerodrome.

== Construction ==
It had two T2 type hangars and one B1 type. The B1 and one of the T2 hangars can still be seen on the airfield site. The T2 near the threshold of runway 21 was recently acquired by the airfield owners and after many years of industrial use is now, once more, an aircraft hangar.

The airfield covered about 600 acres (2.4 km^{2}), and had the usual three runway configuration with perimeter track, hard standings, a brick watchtower and numerous brick and metal buildings for the aircrews and ground staff. A number of the buildings were to the east (Communal Site, Living Quarters, WAAF Quarters) and stretched to and beyond the Lissington road – a road travelled many an evening by the airmen and women who visited their favourite watering hole, the White Hart at Lissington. The Sick Quarters were to the south of the airfield together with a Communal Site and Living Quarters.

== Residential units ==
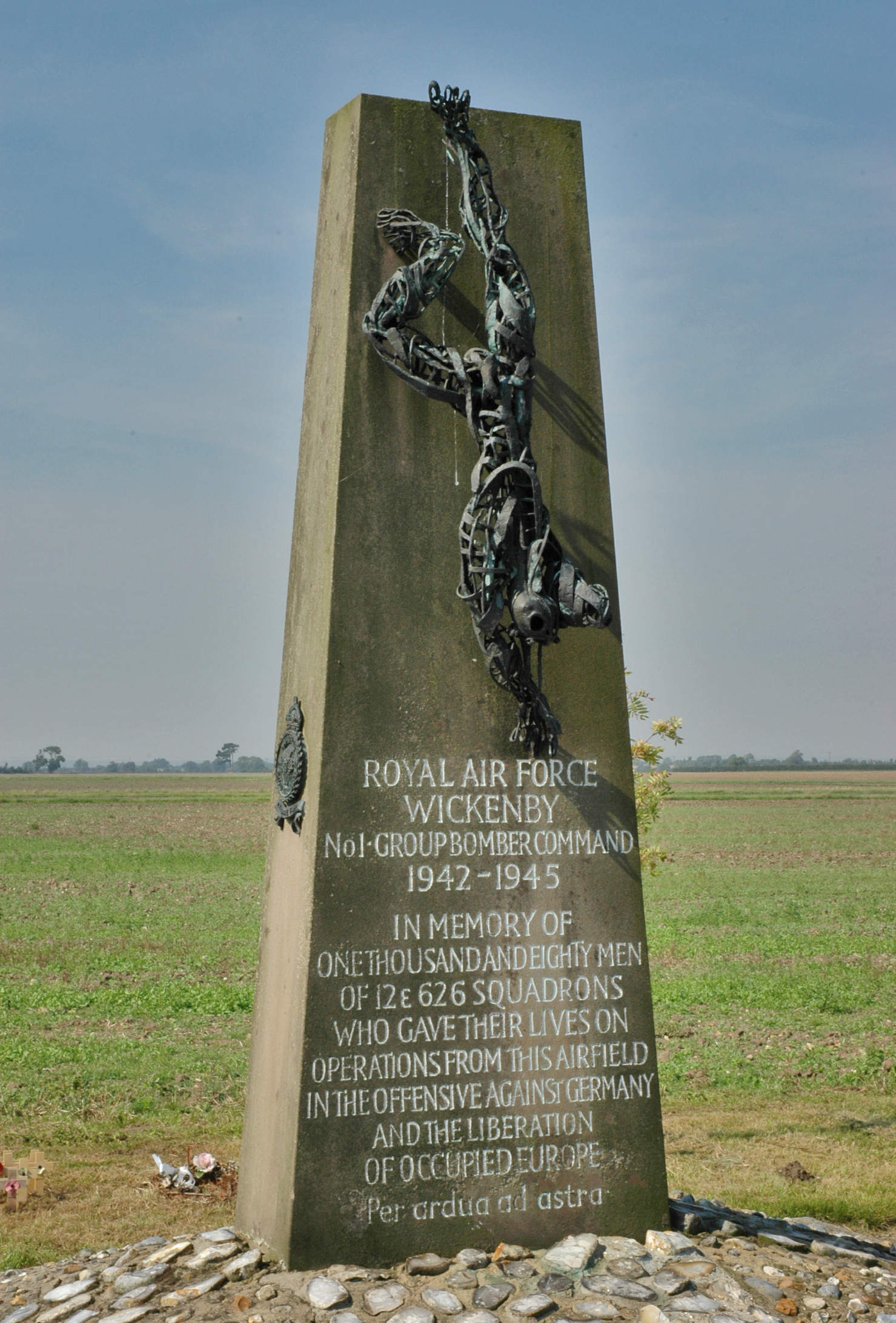
RAF Wickenby Memorial.

Wickenby was occupied in September 1942 by No. 12 Squadron (a/c code PH) who brought with them Vickers Wellington II/III's, but during the winter of 1942/3 they converted to the Avro Lancaster. The Squadron flew the Lancaster throughout the rest of the war. On 7 November 1943, C Flight was expanded to become 626 Squadron (a/c code UM), also flying the Lancaster. Wickenby played a large part in the bomber offensive, taking part in many of the major raids including: Berlin, Munich, Nuremberg, Essen, Mailly-le-Camp, and Caen. Aircraft from Wickenby were also involved in mine-laying (gardening), and operations Manna and Exodus. On 24 September 1945, 12 Squadron moved to a more permanent site at RAF Binbrook.

Having spent its entire existence at Wickenby, 626 Squadron was disbanded on 14 October 1945. The base was later taken over by No. 93 Maintenance Unit and subsequently No. 92 Maintenance Unit who used the runways to dismantle ordnance until 1956 when the base was closed. Civil aviation and maintenance began in 1963, and the land was sold between 1964 and 1966. During the relatively short period of active service 1,080 people died from RAF Wickenby. This sacrifice is commemorated by the RAF Wickenby Memorial in the form of Icarus on an obelisk at the entrance to the airfield. The memorial was placed there by members of the Wickenby Register, an association of former 12/626 Squadron personnel and associate relatives.

== Post-war use ==
The north part of the former airfield is now known as Wickenby Aerodrome, which is a grass and concrete airfield. A road from Holton cum Beckering to Snelland runs right over the former airfield. Companies based at the airfield are Thruster Aircraft who make microlight planes; Lincoln Flight who train pilots and conduct experience flights; and Rase Distribution – a haulage firm. Planes using the airfield have to make contact first with the control tower at RAF Waddington.

The Watch Office is the home of the RAF Wickenby Memorial Collection and the Wickenby Archive, a museum and collection of memorabilia and archive dedicated to the memory of the Squadrons who served here.
