= Tracy Borman =

British historian (born 1972)

Tracy Borman OBE FRHistS FSA
- Borman in 2024

Chancellor of Lincoln Bishop University
- Incumbent
- Assumed office 1 July 2022
- Vice-Chancellor: Peter Neil; Andrew Gower
- Preceded by: Judith Mayhew Jonas

Personal details
- Born: Tracy Joanne Borman; 1 January 1972 (age 54) Lincoln, Lincolnshire, England
- Education: University of Hull
- Occupation: Historian; author

Tracy Joanne Borman (born 1 January 1972) is a historian and author from Scothern, Lincolnshire, England. She is most widely known as the author of Elizabeth's Women, a portrait-gallery of the powerful women who influenced Queen Elizabeth I.

In July 2022 Borman was made Chancellor of Lincoln Bishop University, formerly Bishop Grosseteste University, in Lincoln.

== Early life ==
Borman was born in 1972 in Lincoln, and brought up in the nearby village of Scothern. She was educated at Scothern Primary School (now Ellison Boulters Academy), William Farr School, Welton, and Yarborough School (now Lincoln Castle Academy), Lincoln. She studied and taught history at the University of Hull, where she was awarded a PhD in 1997. Her doctoral thesis was titled Sir Francis Vere in the Netherlands, 1589–1603: a re-evaluation of his career as Sergeant Major General of Elizabeth I’s troops.

== Career ==
Elizabeth's Women was serialised and became a BBC Radio 4 Book of the Week in September 2009. Borman appeared on BBC Radio 4's Woman's Hour, also in September 2009.

In 2013, Borman was appointed Joint Chief Curator of Historic Royal Palaces alongside Lucy Worsley. In 2024 she became Historic Royal Palaces' Chief Historian.

In 2021, Borman also authored an immersive audiovisual step inside a story walking tour for Kensington Gardens entitled Tales of a Mistress in the Georgian Court on the BARDEUM mobile app.

== Honours ==
In February 2021 Borman was elected a Fellow of the Society of Antiquaries of London. Borman was appointed an Officer of the Most Excellent Order of the British Empire (OBE) in the 2024 Birthday Honours for services to heritage.

== Personal life ==
Borman and her husband, whom she married at the Tower of London, live in New Malden, southwest London.

== Published works ==
=== Fiction ===
- The King's Witch (2018)
- The Devil's Slave (2019)
- The Fallen Angel (2020)
- The House of Boleyn (2026)

=== Non-fiction ===
- Henrietta Howard: King's Mistress, Queen's Servant, Jonathan Cape and Vintage (2007)
- Elizabeth's Women: The Hidden Story of the Virgin Queen, Jonathan Cape and Vintage (2010)
- Matilda: Queen of the Conqueror, Jonathan Cape and Vintage (2011)
- The Ring and the Crown: A History of Royal Weddings 1066–2011 (with Alison Weir, Kate Williams and Sarah Gristwood) (2011) ISBN 978-0-09-194377-6
- Witches: A Tale of Sorcery, Scandal and Seduction, Jonathan Cape and Vintage (2013)
- The Story of the Tower of London, Merrell
- Thomas Cromwell: The Hidden Story of Henry VIII's Most Faithful Servant. Hodder and Stoughton (2015)
- The Private Lives of the Tudors: Uncovering the Secrets of Britain's Greatest Dynasty, Hodder and Stoughton (2016)
- Henry VIII: And the Men Who Made Him, Hodder and Stoughton (2019)
- Crown and Sceptre: A New History of the British Monarchy from William the Conqueror to Elizabeth II, Hodder and Stoughton (2021)
- Anne Boleyn & Elizabeth I: The Mother and Daughter Who Changed History, Hodder and Stoughton (2023)
- The Stolen Crown: Treachery, Deceit and the Death of the Tudor Dynasty. Hodder & Stoughton. 4 September 2025. ISBN 978-1-3997-3288-8.
