= Wickenby Aerodrome =

Airport in Lincolnshire, England

Wickenby Aerodrome RAF Wickenby
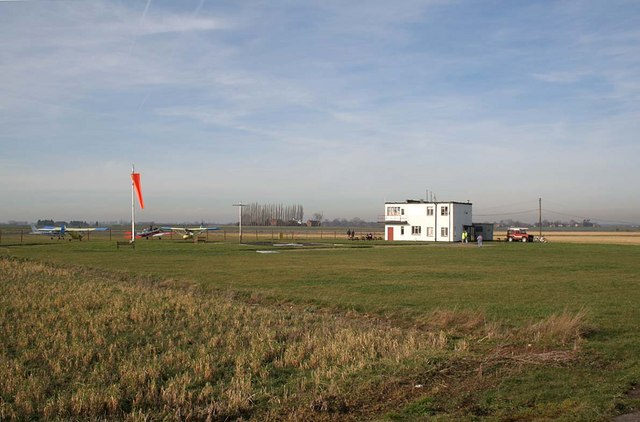
- IATA: none; ICAO: EGNW

Summary
- Airport type: Public
- Operator: Wickenby Aerodrome
- Serves: Langworth
- Location: Holton cum Beckering, Lincolnshire, England
- Elevation AMSL: 84 ft (26 m)
- Coordinates: 53°19′01″N 000°20′56″W
- Website: www.wickenbyairfield.com

Map
- Location in Lincolnshire

Runways
Direction	Length		Surface
Direction	m	ft	Surface
03/21	530	1,738	Concrete
16/34	497	1,630	Concrete
- Source: UK AIP at NATS

Wickenby Aerodrome (ICAO: EGNW) is an airport 8 NM (15 km; 9.2 mi) nautical miles north-east of Lincoln, Lincolnshire, England. It was originally built during World War II as RAF Wickenby, converting to civilian use in 1963.

Wickenby Aerodrome has a CAA Ordinary Licence (Number P882) that allows flights for the public transport of passengers or for flying instruction as authorised by the licensee (Wickenby Aerodrome LLP). The aerodrome is not licensed for night use.

Companies based at the airfield include: Thruster Aircraft, makers of microlights; Fly365 Ltd, which offers pleasure flights; and hauliers Rase Distribution. Pilots approaching the airfield have to initially contact the control tower at RAF Waddington. The local company Game Composites Limited uses this aerodrome for flight testing and development. Their aerobatic monoplane undertook its first flight from Wickenby during 2015.
