= Wickenby =

Village and civil parish in the West Lindsey district of Lincolnshire, England

Coordinates: 53.323715°N 0.368503°W

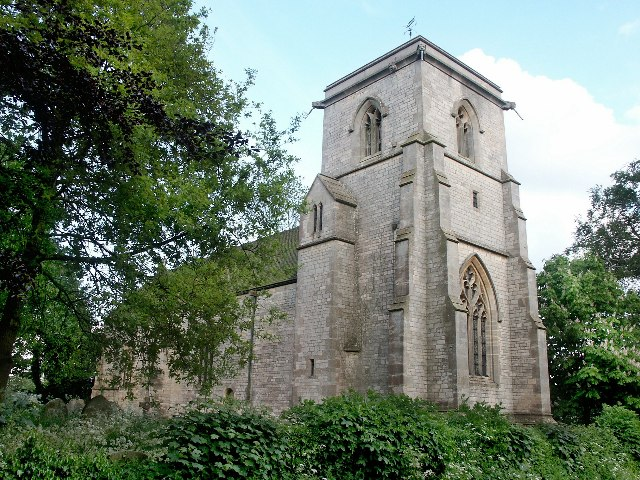
- Church of St Peter and St Lawrence, Wickenby

- Location within Lincolnshire
- Population: 217 (2001)
- OS grid reference: TF087819
  - London: 130 mi (210 km) S
- District: West Lindsey
- Shire county: Lincolnshire
- Region: East Midlands
- Country: England
- Sovereign state: United Kingdom
- Post town: Lincoln
- Postcode district: LN3
- Police: Lincolnshire
- Fire: Lincolnshire
- Ambulance: East Midlands
- UK Parliament: Gainsborough (UK Parliament constituency)

Wickenby is a village and civil parish in the West Lindsey district of Lincolnshire, England. It is situated approximately 5 miles (8.0 km) south-west from the town of Market Rasen.

The name 'Wickenby' derives from the Old Norse víkinga-býr meaning 'farm/settlement of Vikingr' or 'farm/settlement of the Vikings'.

Wickenby existed at the time of the Domesday Book of 1086, when it consisted of fifteen households.

The parish church is a limestone Grade II* listed building dedicated to Saint Peter and Saint Lawrence and dating from the 12th century, although it was restored in 1868 by George Gilbert Scott. In the east wall of the south aisle is set a brass to Henry Millner, who died in 1635.

Wickenby railway station on the Sheffield and Lincolnshire Extension Railway, opened in 1848 and closed in 1965.

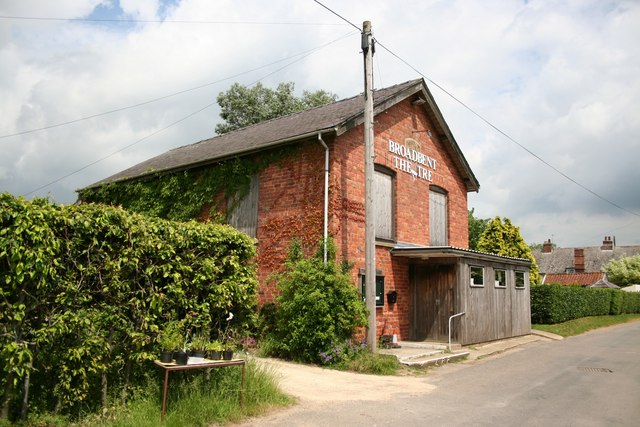
Broadbent Theatre

The former Free United Methodist Chapel, built 1878, was purchased in 1970 by the Holton Players who converted it into a 100-seat theatre, named Broadbent Theatre in memory of Roy Broadbent, father of the actor Jim Broadbent, who designed the conversion.

RAF Wickenby was a Second World War military airfield, opened in 1942. During the war as it served as an RAF Bomber Command station used by Nos. 12 and 626 Squadrons. The northern part of the runway has been used as a civilian airfield, Wickenby Aerodrome, since at least the 1970s. The southern part is disused, and the south-eastern end of the runway is occupied by a poultry farm.
