= Langworth railway station =

Former railway station in Lincolnshire, England

Langworth
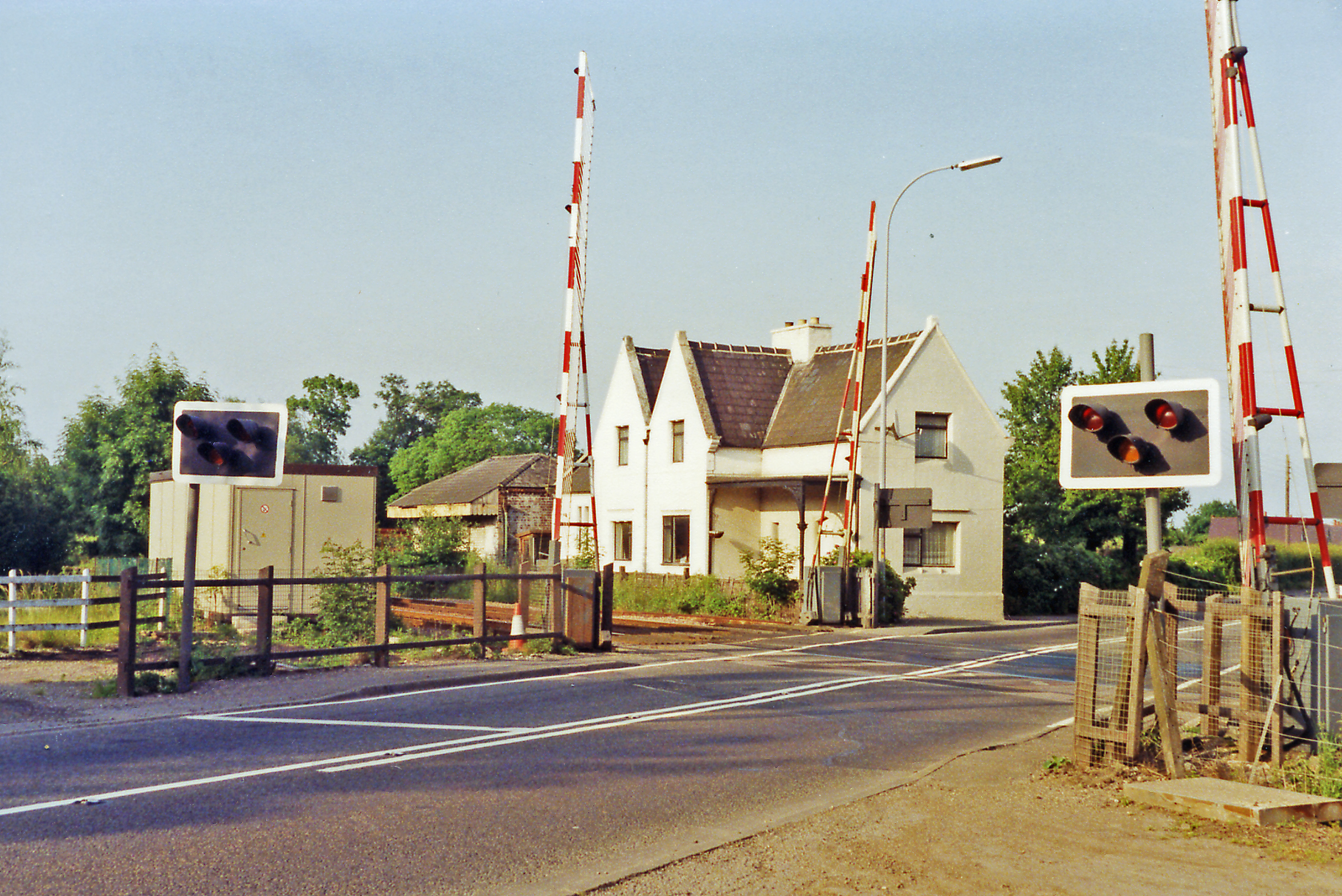
- The station in 1992

General information
- Location: Langworth, Lincolnshire; England
- Coordinates: 53.2704°N 0.4234°W
- Grid reference: TF052759
- Platforms: 2

Other information
- Status: Disused

History
- Original company: Great Grimsby and Sheffield Junction Railway
- Pre-grouping: Great Central Railway

Key dates
- 18 December 1848: Opened
- 1 November 1965: Closed
Location

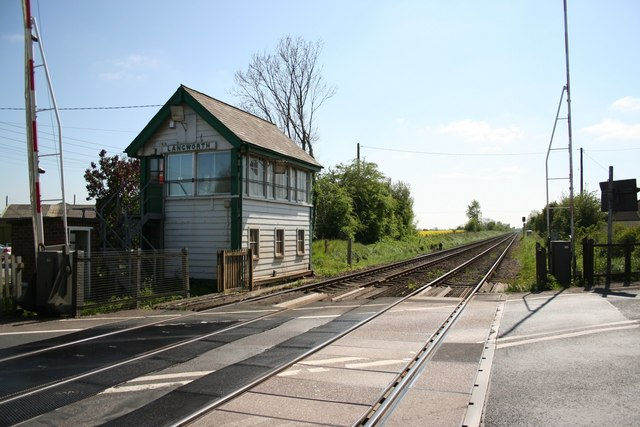
Langworth level crossing

Langworth railway station was a railway station in Langworth, Lincolnshire, opened in 1848 and closed in 1965. On 30 June 2015, a freight train was derailed near the site of the station. On 3 March 2017, The station building was damaged when a stolen car drove through the railway barriers, injuring the two teenage boys in the car.

Preceding station	Disused railways	Following station
Reepham	Great Central Railway	Snelland
