= Reepham =

Reepham may refer to:

- Reepham, Lincolnshire
- Reepham, Norfolk

== See also ==
- Reepham railway station (disambiguation)
