= Lincoln Castle Academy =

Location
- Riseholme Road; Lincoln, Lincolnshire, LN1 3SP; England; 53.2465°N 0.5404°W

Information
- Type: Academy
- Motto: Carpe Diem (Seize the Day)
- Department for Education URN: 136537 Tables
- Ofsted: Reports
- Chair: Professor Scott Fleming
- Head teacher: Richard Hanson
- Gender: Coeducational
- Age: 11 to 16
- Enrolment: 725
- Houses: Logic, Creativity, Ambition, Hope and Tenacity
- Colours: Orange, Red, Purple, Green and Yellow
- Former name: Yarborough School (renamed in 2011)
- Website: https://lincolncastle.org.uk/

Lincoln Castle Academy is a secondary school with academy status located on the north side of the historic city of Lincoln in Lincolnshire, England. It is situated a couple of miles due north of Lincoln Castle, and just west of the Ermine Street Roman road heading north out of Lincoln towards the Humber estuary.

== History ==
Lincoln Castle Academy was established on 1 April 2011, after the former Yarborough School was granted academy status.

=== Yarborough School ===
The Conservatives took control of council in 1967, by a majority of ten, which increased to 21 in early May 1968; in February 1968, Lincoln Education Committee had shelved plans for the school, to replace two overcrowded schools; the education committee chairman was Conservative councillor Gilbert Blades. There were plans for a £450,000 swimming pool in Lincoln, which were cancelled in July 1970; instead, a 33-metre £250,000 pool would be built at the school, and one at Boultham Moor Secondary School.

The new assistant headmaster would be Kenneth Hunter, head of English of the City Grammar School for Boys, in Lincoln, who attended Coalville Grammar School and the University of Birmingham in 1953. Although the first Headteacher, Eric Wilson, was recruited in September 1970, students began attending from Thursday 7 January 1971, with all of the 780 by Monday 11 January.

The site was built by William Wright & Sons of Lincoln. It mostly had a secondary-modern-type cohort.

Yarborough School officially opened on the Riseholme Road site on Saturday 27 March 1971, by Horace King, Baron Maybray-King.

It was a mixed comprehensive education school for students aged 11 and over, replacing the previous Rosemary Secondary Modern for Boys and Spring Hill Secondary Modern for Girls schools. The majority of the original staff also transferred from those schools.

In January 1972 it was decided to build a £350,000 sports centre, with 25m six-lane swimming pool. A Phase II building programme, which included the Gymnasium and a Craft block for wood and metal work, opened in September 1973.

A devastating fire was started on the night of 5 September 1975 at the end of the first week of term, which destroyed the original ‘East Block’ building. Within a fortnight the first of 11 temporary classrooms had arrived, with lessons also taking place at Bishop Grosseteste University, Lincoln's Drill Hall and Riseholme College of Agriculture.

Staff organised a morale-boosting party on 20 September but the fire-ravaged scene was devastating, with over £600,000 worth of damage. What books were salvaged from the library were moved to a temporary home in the school's main reception.

A local man was convicted of arson on 3 December 1975 and sentenced to six years' imprisonment.

Yarborough School developed a reputation for its sporting prowess during the 1970s, assisted by it having access to the adjoining Yarborough Leisure Centre during academic hours. Yarborough Leisure Centre was first used by the public on 26 April 1976 but the official opening, by then Lincoln City FC manager, Graham Taylor, was on 18 June 1976.

With its facilities, playing fields and running track, Yarborough School was frequently the host of county-wide sporting competitions.

A new Sixth Form centre, now Lincoln Castle Academy's Resource Centre, opened on 7 January 1977 and by 7 September a new Art, Needlework and Home Economics block had opened near the existing Technology and Craft buildings.

On 17 January 1978, after a longer than normal Christmas break to save money due to the expense of heating oil, the current 'East Block' was opened, with a new Music building completing the construction programme.

In September 1989 a number of students joined Yarborough School from South Park High School, Lincoln and Sturton by Stow Secondary Modern School, both of which officially closed in August 1989. South Park's languages laboratory also moved to Yarborough after the closure.

January 1991 marked Yarborough's 20th anniversary; remarkably eight members of the original teaching staff were still there.

A year later, on 1 January 1992, the school, like many others across the country, gained Grant Maintained Status.

Two new Science laboratories were opened on 14 July 1993 at the far end of 'West Block', an area of the school still known as the 'Science Bungalow'.

On the event of Yarborough School's 25th anniversary the RAF's Red Arrows, which are based in Lincolnshire, gave a special aerobatic display.

Yarborough School became a Business and Enterprise Specialist School in 2003, the legacy of which continues today, with students studying business from Year 9 onwards, as well as being a lead centre for delivering Enterprise education and piloting new entrepreneurial initiatives.

By September 2004, funding from the specialist status allowed a number of refurbishments which included three new Business classrooms replacing the old library in 'East Block', the library becoming the Resource Centre, and relocating where the Sixth Form area was with Year 12 and 13 students moving to the stand-alone building previously occupied by Music.

=== Lincoln Castle Academy ===
In April 2011 Yarborough School officially became Lincoln Castle Academy, adopting a new identity immediately with a turreted castle tower and a Fleur de Lys from the City of Lincoln's own coat of arms featuring on the new design.

== Headteachers ==
- Eric Wilson, September 1970 to July 1993
- Kostek Shanovich, September 1993 to June 1999
- Graham Legg, September 1999 to July 2003
- Rob Boothroyd, January 2004 to July 2014
- Louise Laming, September 2014 to late 2021
- Emma Halpin, Late 2021 to December 2021
- Richard Hanson, April 2022 – late 2024
- Johnathan Hodgson, February 2025 - present

== Subjects ==
In Years 10 and 11 (Key Stage 4) the following subjects are offered:

Core subjects: Life, English, English Literature, Ethics and Religion, ICT, Mathematics, Science and Work Skills.

Optional subjects: Art & Design, Design & Technology, Drama, Geography, Hair Services, Health & Social Care, History, Media, Modern Languages, Music, Performing Arts, Photography, Public Services, Sports Studies and Travel & Tourism.

In Sixth Form (Key Stage 5) the following subjects are offered:

Optional subjects: Applied Science, Art & Design, Biology, Life, Chemistry, Childcare, Countryside Management, Creative Media Production, Drama & Theatre Studies, Engineering, English Language, English Literature, Geography, Hair Services, Health & Social Care, History, Hospitality Management, ICT, Mathematics, Music, Performing Arts, Photography, Physics, Psychology, Public Services, Religious Studies, Resistant Materials, Sociology, Sports Studies, Textiles and Travel & Tourism.

== Academic performance ==
Lincoln Castle Academy's GCSE performance for summer 2012:

- A* to C grades including English and Maths 51%
- A* to C grades (all subjects) 95%
- A* to G grades (all subjects) 100%

Its A-level performance for summer 2012:

- A* to B grades 32%
- A* to C grades 59%
- A* to E grades 96%

== Notable former pupils ==
- Tracy Borman (1988 to 1990), Historian.
- Steve Froggatt (1984 to 1989), Former professional footballer (1991-2001). Now a company director and football pundit on BBC television and radio.
- Tyrone Huntley (2000 to 2005), Singer and actor who specialises in stage musicals.
- Rebecca Brownbridge (1992 to 1997), won strictly come dancing in 2013 whilst having a crutch

== Famous Teachers ==
- Jim Aram - Famous Marathon runner<https://www.parkrun.org.uk/lincoln/news/2016/09/10/event-140-10092016/></1>
- Katie Milbourne - Featured in top gear in 2011
- Johnathan Hodgson - Acted in terminator
- Sarah Rose Johnson - Won masked singer
- Caroline May - Chaser on the chase in 2015
- Tom Rileys - Acted as the tin man on broadway
- Timothy Smith - Acted as Fred Elliot on the show eastenders
- Daniella Corlette - Previous NASA engineer
- Duncan Richardson - Participated in finding the cure for gonorrhoea
- Paul Merrell - Related to Einstein
- Jake Pollard - One of the first conjoined twins to be separated
- Tudor Roberts - Famous TikToker that completes the New York Times daily games
