= Jim Broadbent =

British actor (born 1949)

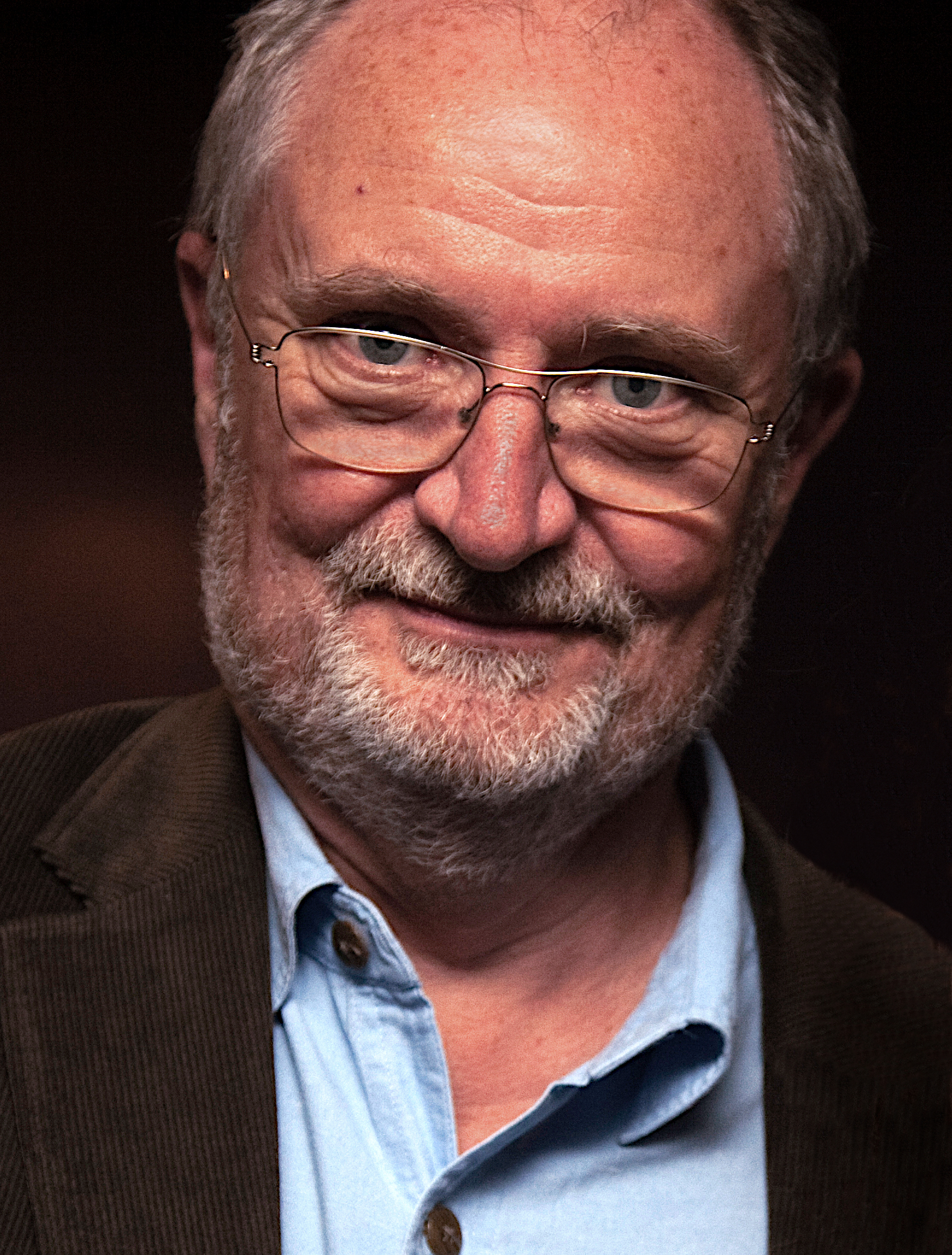
- Jim Broadbent in 2012
- Born: James Broadbent; 24 May 1949 (age 77); Holton cum Beckering, Lincolnshire, England
- Education: London Academy of Music and Dramatic Art
- Occupation: Actor
- Years active: 1971–present
- Spouse: Anastasia Lewis (m. 1987)

James Broadbent (born 24 May 1949) is a British actor. After graduating from the London Academy of Music and Dramatic Art in 1972, he came to prominence as a character actor for his many roles in film and television. He has received various accolades including an Academy Award, two BAFTA Awards, an International Emmy Award, two Golden Globe Awards and one Volpi Cup as well as nominations for two Primetime Emmy Awards and a Grammy Award.

Broadbent received an Academy Award for his supporting role as John Bayley in the film Iris (2001), and a BAFTA Award for Best Actor in a Supporting Role for playing Harold Zidler in Moulin Rouge! (2001). His early film roles include the Terry Gilliam films Time Bandits (1981) and Brazil (1985) before a breakthrough role in Mike Leigh's Life Is Sweet (1990). Notable film roles include Bullets Over Broadway (1994), Topsy-Turvy (1999), Bridget Jones's Diary (2001), Gangs of New York (2002), Another Year (2010), The Iron Lady (2011), Le Week-End (2013), and Brooklyn (2015).

Broadbent is also known for his roles in franchise films such as Horace Slughorn in the Harry Potter film series, Digory Kirke in The Chronicles of Narnia: The Lion, the Witch and the Wardrobe (2005) and Samuel Gruber in the Paddington film series. He also acted in blockbuster and studio films such as The Borrowers (1997), Robots (2005), Hot Fuzz (2007), Indiana Jones and the Kingdom of the Crystal Skull (2008), Arthur Christmas (2011) and Cloud Atlas (2012).

Broadbent's television roles include playing Roy Slater in the BBC sitcom Only Fools and Horses, Desmond Morton in the HBO / BBC film The Gathering Storm (2002), and Lord Longford in the Channel 4 film Longford (2006), which won him a BAFTA Award for Best Actor. He portrayed Archmaester Ebrose in the seventh season of the HBO fantasy series Game of Thrones in 2017. He also acted in London Spy (2015), War & Peace (2016), King Lear (2018) and The Unlikely Pilgrimage of Harold Fry (2023).

== Early life and education ==
James Broadbent was born on 24 May 1949, in Holton cum Beckering, Lincolnshire, the second son of Doreen "Dee" Findlay, a sculptor, and Roy Laverick Broadbent, an artist, sculptor, interior designer and furniture maker. Broadbent's parents were both amateur actors who co-founded the Holton Players acting troupe at Holton. The two have been described by the BBC as conscientious objectors who "worked the land" rather than participate in World War II. In Wickenby, a former Methodist Chapel was purchased in 1970 by Holton Players, who converted it into a 100-seat theatre, named Broadbent Theatre in memory of Roy Broadbent, who designed the conversion.

Broadbent was educated at Leighton Park School, a Quaker school in Reading, and briefly attended art college before transferring to the London Academy of Music and Dramatic Art, graduating in 1972. His early stage work included appearances as Patrick Barlow's assistant in the mock National Theatre of Brent.

== Career ==
=== 1971–1989: Rise to prominence ===
Broadbent's early stagework included a number of productions for The National Theatre of Brent as the downtrodden assistant Wallace to Patrick Barlow's self-important actor-manager character Desmond Olivier Dingle. Broadbent and Barlow played many male and female character roles in comically less-than-epic tellings of historical and religious stories, such as The Complete Guide to Sex, The Greatest Story Ever Told, Revolution!!, and All The World's A Globe. These were hits at the Edinburgh Fringe, in London, and on tour. In 1978, he had two roles, first as Vroomfondel (who may, or may not be, a philosopher) and then as Shooty (a gratuitously violent policeman, who writes novel in crayon) in the Primary Phase of the groundbreaking radio series The Hitchhiker’s Guide to the Galaxy. Forty years later, he took the role of Marvin in the Hexagonal Phase radio series. Towards the end of the decade, Broadbent began appearing in small roles on television and films, including a Fielder in The Shout and Mackanees in the Play for Today episode Long Distance Information. He also appeared in an edition of Not the Nine O'Clock News, playing a Union Negotiator.

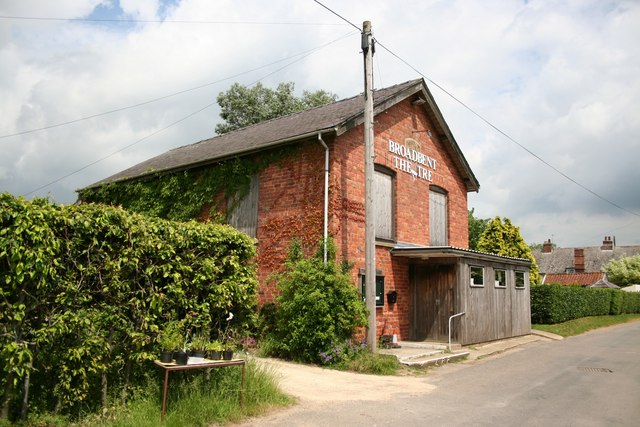
The Broadbent Theatre, Wickenby, Lincolnshire, named after Roy Broadbent, father of Jim. Photographed 2006

During that decade, his stage work included the original productions of Kafka's Dick (1986) and Our Country's Good (1988) at the Royal Court Theatre, and work for the Royal National Theatre including "The Government Inspector". Work on the stage with Mike Leigh includes Goosepimples and Ecstasy. He had worked with Stephen Frears in The Hit (1984), and Terry Gilliam in Time Bandits (1981) and Brazil (1985). He starred in the National Theatre production of A Place with the Pigs in 1988, directed by the play's author Athol Fugard.

Broadbent also appeared in 1983, 1985 and 1991 as DCI Roy Slater, a minor character in the prominent sitcom Only Fools and Horses. The character appeared in three episodes over an eight-year period. He had originally been offered the lead role of Del Boy in the series, but he turned it down due to other commitments. He also made occasional guest appearances in other comedy shows including Happy Families, and Victoria Wood As Seen on TV. In 1983, he portrayed Don Speekingleesh in The Queen of Spain's Beard in the first series of The Black Adder. He later played Prince Albert in Blackadder's Christmas Carol, first broadcast in 1988. One of his final roles that decade, was as the disgruntled Northern playwright Alan Hammond in the final episode of the playlet series Victoria Wood.

=== 1990–2007: Established actor ===
Broadbent's film breakthrough came in Mike Leigh's independent comedy drama Life Is Sweet (1990). In the 1990s he established himself as a character actor in films including Mike Newell's period romance Enchanted April (1991), Neil Jordan's thriller The Crying Game (1992), Woody Allen's 1920s-set showbiz comedy Bullets Over Broadway (1994), and Richard Loncraine's film adaptation of Richard III (1995). He appeared with John Goodman in fantasy comedy The Borrowers (1997), and with Michael Caine in the musical comedy Little Voice (1998). Broadbent ended the decade by taking a leading role playing dramatist Sir William S. Gilbert in another Mike Leigh film, Topsy-Turvy (1999).

Broadbent's television work during the Nineties included playing Jim Morley in Gone to the Dogs, and Monty in the follow-up series Gone to Seed. Further comic roles included Murder Most Horrid as Selwyn Proops, The Comic Strip Presents as George and most notably the lead role of branch manager Peter Duffley in the sitcom The Peter Principle which ran for two series, broadcast between 1995 - 2000. He also appeared as Charlie Bennett in an episode of Inspector Morse. In 1999, he made a notable appearance as the eleventh incarnation of the Doctor in the Doctor Who spoof Doctor Who: The Curse of Fatal Death.

In 2001, Broadbent starred in three of the year's most successful films: Richard Curtis' Bridget Jones's Diary, Baz Luhrmann's Moulin Rouge!, and Richard Eyre's Iris, for which he won an Academy Award for Best Supporting Actor for his performance. In 2002, he appeared in Martin Scorsese's Gangs of New York, and in the film adaptation of Dickens' Nicholas Nickleby. In 2005, Broadbent appeared in the film adaptation of C. S. Lewis' classic children's fantasy novel The Chronicles of Narnia: The Lion, the Witch and the Wardrobe as Professor Kirke. That same year Broadbent had voice roles in Robots, Valiant, and The Magic Roundabout. He also joined Rowan Atkinson in his Spider-Man spoof Spider-Plant Man, as a disgruntled and envious Batman.

Broadbent played the lead role of the TV film Wide-Eyed and Legless. Based on a true story, the drama tells of Deric Longden's wife, Diana and her fight against a mysterious wasting illness which turned out to be myalgic encephalomyelitis. It began as a type of flu but it grew progressively worse. She was subject to blackouts and became so debilitated that she could barely get out of her wheelchair. It led to years of pain and paralysis that ended in her death. Broadbent portrayed the title role in the Channel 4 drama Longford in October 2006, earning a BAFTA TV Award, a Golden Globe and a 2007 Emmy nomination for his performance as Frank Pakenham (1905–2001), Earl of Longford, which was centred on Longford's ultimately unsuccessful campaign for the parole of Myra Hindley from her life imprisonment for the Moors Murders. Broadbent appeared as Inspector Frank Butterman in Hot Fuzz in 2007. He was also a regular in Stephen Fry's radio comedy show Saturday Night Fry, which aired on BBC Radio 4 in 1988. In 2008, he starred as pro-Newtonian physicist Sir Oliver Lodge in the fact-based single drama Einstein and Eddington for the BBC.

=== 2008–present: Career expansion ===
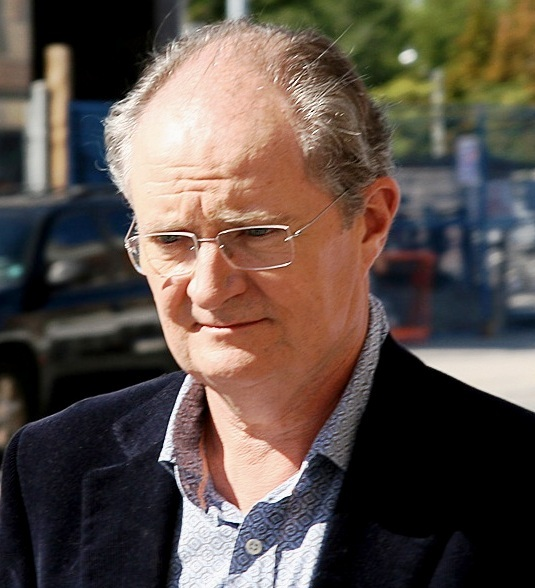
Broadbent in 2007

Broadbent also appeared in the fourth film in the Indiana Jones series, Indiana Jones and the Kingdom of the Crystal Skull (2008) with Harrison Ford, Shia LaBeouf, Cate Blanchett and Ray Winstone, directed by Steven Spielberg; and in The Young Victoria (2009), alongside Emily Blunt as King William IV. Broadbent joined a long list of British actors by appearing in Harry Potter and the Half-Blood Prince, as well as the final movie in the series Harry Potter and the Deathly Hallows – Part 2 as Horace Slughorn In 2009, he portrayed Sam Longson, chairman of Derby County football club in the 1960s and 1970s, in the film The Damned United; the starring character in the film was football manager Brian Clough, played by Michael Sheen. In 2010, he provided the voice for the character Major Mouse in a series of radio advertisements and one produced for television for an energy company, E.ON, for their eonenergyfit.com website campaign. He also starred as the older Logan Mountstuart in the TV adaptation of William Boyd's novel Any Human Heart. He had a lead role in Exile, a BBC One drama, starring John Simm and written by Danny Brocklehurst.

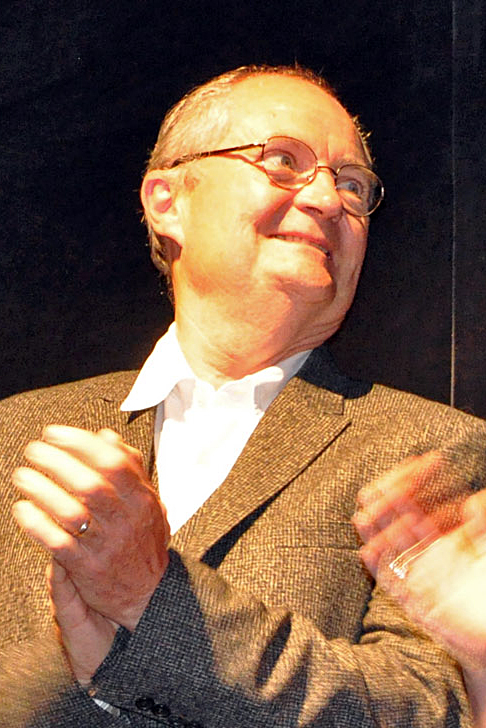
Broadbent at the 2010 Toronto International Film Festival

In 2010, Broadbent reunited with director Mike Leigh, in Another Year In 2012, he played Denis Thatcher opposite Meryl Streep as the former Prime Minister in The Iron Lady. That same year he also starred in Cloud Atlas with Tom Hanks, Hugh Grant, Halle Berry, Hugo Weaving, and Ben Whishaw. In 2014, he starred alongside Lindsay Duncan in the Roger Mitchell directed film, Le Week-End.

In 2015, Broadbent starred alongside Saoirse Ronan, Domhnall Gleeson and Julie Walters in the Oscar nominated film Brooklyn. Later that year, he also appeared alongside Maggie Smith and Alex Jennings in Alan Bennett's comedy film The Lady in the Van (2015). In 2015, Broadbent along with Daniel Rigby, Antonia Thomas, Fearne Cotton and Jane Horrocks are revealed to be the new cast with Broadbent as a Voice Trumpet in the reboot of classic British children's television series Teletubbies. Since 2016, Broadbent narrates Kevin the Carrot Christmas adverts for the UK branch of Aldi. In the 2020 advert, Broadbent portrayed Santa Claus, who was revealed to be the narrator. Broadbent has also appeared alongside Hugh Bonneville, Sally Hawkins, Julie Walters and Ben Whishaw in the British comedy films, Paddington (2014) and Paddington 2 (2018).

In 2016, he was cast in the seventh season of the HBO series Game of Thrones. In 2017 he starred alongside Charlotte Rampling, Michelle Dockery, and Emily Mortimer in the ensemble thriller The Sense of an Ending.

On 28 May 2018, he played Gloucester in the BBC Two production of King Lear acting alongside Anthony Hopkins, Emma Thompson and Florence Pugh.

In 2018, he played Hans Christian Andersen in the premiere of Martin McDonagh's play A Very Very Very Dark Matter at the Bridge Theatre in London. In 2020, Broadbent starred in the limited series Black Narcissus based on the classic Powell and Pressburger film. The series premiered on 23 November 2020 on FX. The series also stars Gemma Arterton, Alessandro Nivola and Diana Rigg. Broadbent starred opposite Helen Mirren in the comedy drama film The Duke. The film had its world premiere at the Venice International Film Festival on 4 September 2020 and was pushed to be released in cinemas in the UK on 25 February 2021 because of the COVID-19 pandemic.

On 26 June 2018, Fantagraphics Books published the graphic novel Dull Margaret, a collaboration between The Guardian cartoonist Dix and Broadbent. The novel is inspired by the 1563 painting Dulle Griet by Pieter Bruegel the Elder.

In 2024, he was involved in the third Paddington Bear film alongside Hugh Bonneville, Julie Walters, Carla Tous, Antonio Banderas, Olivia Colman and Emily Mortimer in Paddington in Peru (2024).

== Personal life ==
Broadbent has been married to painter and former theatre designer Anastasia Lewis since 1987. He has no children, but Lewis has two sons from a previous relationship. Broadbent primarily lives in the Lincolnshire Wolds. He also owns a property in London. He is an atheist.

== Filmography ==
=== Films ===
Selected films:

- The Passage (1979)
- Time Bandits (1981)
- Brazil (1985)
- Superman IV: The Quest for Peace (1987)
- Erik The Viking (1989)
- Life is Sweet (1990)
- Enchanted April (1991)
- The Crying Game (1992)
- Bullets Over Broadway (1994)
- Richard III (1995)
- Rough Magic (1995)
- The Borrowers (1997)
- Little Voice (1998)
- Topsy-Turvy (1999)
- Bridget Jones's Diary (2001)
- Moulin Rouge! (2001)
- Iris (2001)
- Gangs of New York (2002)
- Nicholas Nickleby (2002)
- Bright Young Things (2003)
- Around the World in 80 Days (2004)
- Vanity Fair (2004)
- Vera Drake (2004)
- Bridget Jones: The Edge of Reason (2004)
- The Magic Roundabout (2005)
- Robots (2005)
- Valiant (2005)
- The Chronicles of Narnia: The Lion, the Witch and the Wardrobe (2005)
- Art School Confidential (2006)
- Hot Fuzz (2007)
- Indiana Jones and the Kingdom of the Crystal Skull (2008)
- Inkheart (2008)
- Harry Potter and the Half-Blood Prince (2009)
- The Young Victoria (2009)
- The Damned United (2009)
- Another Year (2010)
- Harry Potter and the Deathly Hallows – Part 2 (2011)
- The Iron Lady (2011)
- Arthur Christmas (2011)
- Cloud Atlas (2012)
- Filth (2013)
- Le Week-End (2013)
- Big Game (2014)
- Paddington (2014)
- Get Santa (2014)
- Brooklyn (2015)
- The Lady in the Van (2015)
- Eddie the Eagle (2016)
- The Legend of Tarzan (2016)
- Bridget Jones's Baby (2016)
- The Sense of an Ending (2017)
- Paddington 2 (2017)
- King of Thieves (2018)
- Dolittle (2020)
- The Duke (2020)
- A Boy Called Christmas (2021)
- The Unlikely Pilgrimage of Harold Fry (2023)
- Paddington in Peru (2024)
- Bridget Jones: Mad About the Boy (2025)
- Jay Kelly (2025)

=== Television ===
Selected Television:

- Tales of the Unexpected - Stranger in Town S5 ep5 (uncredited) (1982)
- Only Fools and Horses - DCI Roy Slater (1983 to 1991)
- The Enchanted World of Brambly Hedge - Basil, Ernest Vole and, Purslane Saltapple (1996 to 2000)
- The Gathering Storm (2002)
- And Starring Pancho Villa as Himself (2003)
- Longford (2006)
- Any Human Heart (2010)
- London Spy (2015)
- War & Peace (2016)
- Game of Thrones (2017)
- King Lear (2018)
- Black Narcissus (2020)
- The Lord of the Rings: The Rings of Power (2024)
- Love, Death & Robots (2025)

== Awards and honours ==
Broadbent received his Academy Award for Best Supporting Actor for his performance in Richard Eyre's Iris (2001) starring alongside Judi Dench. That same year he won his British Academy Film Award for his performance in Baz Luhrmann's Moulin Rouge! (2001). In 2007, he received a British Academy Television Award for his work in Tom Hooper's television film, Longford (2007). He has received two Golden Globe Awards for his performances in Iris (2001) and Longford (2007). He also received two Primetime Emmy Award nominations for his performance as Desmond Morton in the BBC/HBO production The Gathering Storm (2002) and as Lord Longford in Longford (2007).

Broadbent was offered an OBE in 2002, but he declined it, stating that there were more deserving recipients than actors and that the British Empire was not something he wanted to "celebrate". Broadbent was made an Honorary Associate of London Film School.

== Bibliography ==
In 2018, Broadbent's first graphic novel Dull Margaret was published by Fantagraphics Books.
