= Muriel Robinson =

British academic administrator and education scholar

Professor Muriel Robinson OBE DL

Vice-Chancellor of Bishop Grosseteste University Principal (2003–2012)
- In office 2003–2013
- Succeeded by: Peter Neil

Personal details
- Born: 21 February 1954 (age 72)
- Citizenship: United Kingdom
- Spouse: Richard Mosiewicz (m. 1981)
- Education: University of London

Muriel Anita Robinson, OBE, DL (born 21 February 1954) is a retired British academic administrator and education scholar. From 2003 to 2013, she headed Bishop Grosseteste University, first as Principal and then as Vice-Chancellor. She had previously been a primary school teacher, and then lectured at Brighton Polytechnic and Newman College of Higher Education.

== Early life and education ==
Robinson was born on 21 February 1954 to Albert and Anita Robinson. She studied English and education studies at Furzedown Teacher Training College in London, graduating with a Bachelor of Education (BEd) degree in 1976. She later continued her studies: she graduated from the Institute of Education, University of London with a Master of Arts (MA) degree in language and literature in 1985, and with a Doctor of Philosophy (PhD) degree in 1995. Her doctoral thesis was titled "An investigation of children reading print and television narratives".

== Career ==
From 1976 to 1985, Robinson taught in various primary schools of the Inner London Education Authority.

In 1985, Robinson joined Brighton Polytechnic as a lecturer of "English in Education". she was promoted to senior lecturer in 1987 and to principal lecturer in 1993. From 1990 to 1997, she served as course leader. From 1998 to 2000, she was the Deputy Head of School.

From 2000 to 2003, Robinson was the Vice-Principal of the Newman College of Higher Education, Birmingham. She was then Principal of Bishop Grosseteste College from 2003 to 2012. When the college was awarded university status in 2012, she was appointed its first Vice-Chancellor. She retired from academia in April 2013, and was appointed professor emeritus.

== Later life ==
Since 2015, Robinson has been an elected lay member of the General Synod of the Church of England. She is also a member of the Bishop's Council, the main strategic body for the Diocese of Lincoln.

== Personal life ==
In 1981, Robinson married Richard Mosiewicz.

== Honours ==
In the 2013 New Year Honours, Robinson was appointed an Officer of the Order of the British Empire (OBE) "for services to higher education". On 7 June 2013, she was made a Deputy Lieutenant (DL) to the Lord Lieutenant of Lincolnshire.
