= Wickenby railway station =

Former railway station in England

Coordinates: 53.3311°N 0.3745°W

Wickenby

General information
- Location: Wickenby, Lincolnshire; England

Other information
- Status: Disused

History
- Opened: 18 December 1848; 177 years ago
- Closed: 1 November 1965; 60 years ago
- Original company: Manchester, Sheffield and Lincolnshire Railway
- Pre-grouping: Great Central Railway
- Post-grouping: London and North Eastern Railway
Location

Wickenby railway station was a station in Wickenby, Lincolnshire on the line between Lincoln and Grimsby, opened in 1848 and closed in 1965.

Preceding station	Historical railways	Following station
Snelland; Line open, station closed	Great Central Railway	Market Rasen; Line and station open
