= Reepham railway station (Lincolnshire) =

Former railway station in Lincolnshire, England

Coordinates: 53.2519°N 0.4403°W

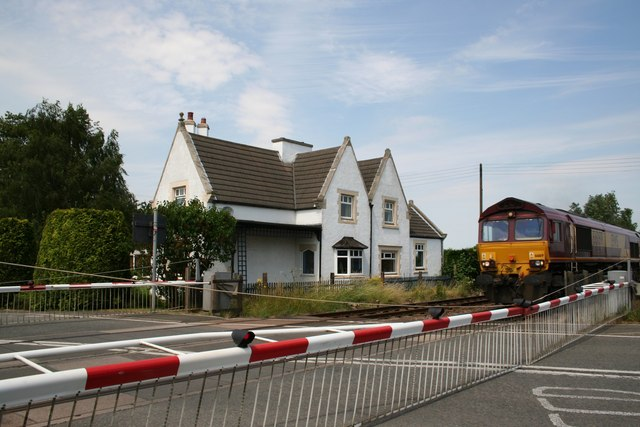
Level crossing and former station buildings cf. Station building at Snelland on the same line

Reepham railway station was a railway station in Reepham, Lincolnshire which opened in 1848 and closed in 1965, though the line is still in use. It was located a few miles east of Lincoln.

The station's building is now a private residence. The former coal yard and sidings are occupied by two bungalows. There is no trace of the platforms which were located either side of the level crossing, the staggered layout being typical of the company that built the line. The manual signal box and crossing gates were removed a few years ago and replaced by barriers.

They are controlled by the still staffed signal box at Langworth further up the line towards Market Rasen, the next still-in-use station on the line. The removal of the staffed signal box has resulted in much longer waiting times for road traffic and pedestrians since the control was moved to Langworth. Up to closure, the station was used by grammar school pupils to go to De Aston School in Market Rasen. There are occasional calls for the station to be re-opened. It was the only village station on the line which was actually in the village. Most others being a few miles outside the villages from which the stations took their names.

The line links Newark North Gate/Newark Castle-Lincoln Central-Grimsby-Cleethorpes. A couple of miles east of the village is the Welton oil field where a gathering station is located, and the oil is tanked for transportation, making the line very busy for freight.
