= Reepham railway station =

Reepham railway station may refer to:

- Reepham railway station (Lincolnshire)
- Reepham railway station (Norfolk)
- Whitwell & Reepham railway station, also in Reepham, Norfolk
