= Holton cum Beckering =

Village in Lincolnshire, England

Coordinates: 53.317°N 0.326°W

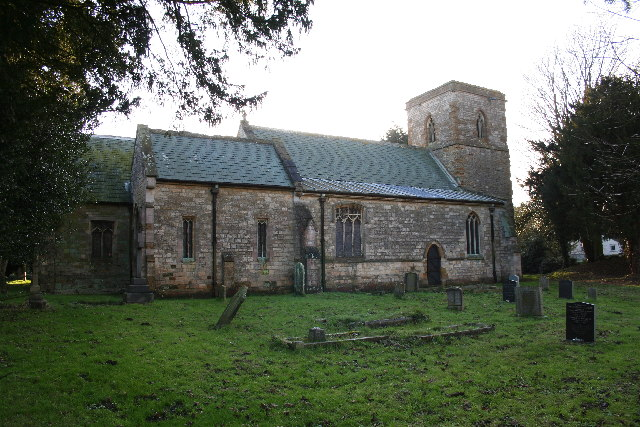
- All Saints' Church, Holton cum Beckering

- Location within Lincolnshire
- Population: 140 (2001 census)
- OS grid reference: TF115813
  - London: 125 mi (201 km) S
- District: West Lindsey
- Shire county: Lincolnshire
- Region: East Midlands
- Country: England
- Sovereign state: United Kingdom
- Post town: MARKET RASEN
- Postcode district: LN8
- Dialling code: 01673
- Police: Lincolnshire
- Fire: Lincolnshire
- Ambulance: East Midlands

Holton cum Beckering is a small village and civil parish in West Lindsey, Lincolnshire, England. It is situated 6 miles (10 km) south from Market Rasen at the junction of the B1202 and B1399 roads. At the 2001 census it had a population of 140.

== History ==
Around the village is evidence of Medieval settlement, defined by cropmarks and ridge and furrow earthworks indicating crofts and enclosures. Near Holton Hall are possible remains of a moat.

In 1885 Kelly's noted that the parish was of 1,862 acres (7.54 km^{2}) with chief agricultural production being of wheat, oats, barley and seeds, and an 1881 population of 165.

== Landmarks ==
All Saints' Church is a Grade I listed Anglican church. Kelly's mentions that it comprises a chancel, nave, aisles and south porch, and a square tower containing three bells, with the chancel incorporating richly painted frescoes and a carved oak screen separating the chancel from the nave. Benches were carved by a Mr Swaby of Marsh Chapel when the chancel was rebuilt in 1851 by a Mr Nicholson of Lincoln. The church was restored in 1859-60 and 1870-74 by George Gilbert Scott, who rebuilt the north arcade and added, according to Nikolaus Pevsner, a "glittering mosaic reredos... made, according to Canon Binnal, by a Catholic Italian who insisted on smoking his pipe while doing it". Also noted was a chalice and paten cover dated 1569. Scott also repaired both aisles, and rebuilt a mortuary chapel and the whole roof.

Other listed buildings are early 18th-century Holton Hall and late 17th-century Abbey Farm House.

== Culture ==
The amateur dramatic society was originally known as the Holton Players. Following a move to Wickenby, in 1970, they were renamed the Lindsey Rural Players.

Academy Award-winning actor Jim Broadbent was born in the village in 1949; his parents, Roy and Dee Broadbent, were founder members of the Holton Players.

== BBC documentaries ==
The village was the subject of a BBC Radio 4 documentary Conchies of Holton-Cum-Beckering on 7 May 2007. Presented by Billy Bragg, it interviewed the surviving members of a group of Second World War conscientious objectors who formed themselves into farming communities and an amateur dramatic society.

A documentary on BBC Radio 4 Extra The Holton Players was broadcast on 1 September 2014 (and repeated on 21 June 2017). It was presented by Jim Broadbent.
