= Ellison Boulters Academy =

Ellison Boulters Church of England Primary Academy

Location
- Sudbrooke Road, Scothern; Lincoln, Lincolnshire, LN2 2UZ; England; 53°16′53″N 0°26′57″W

Information
- Type: Academy
- Motto: Our Children will flourish as aspirational citizens who value themselves and respect others through Christian values.
- Religious affiliation: Church of England
- Established: 1989
- Department for Education URN: 138753 Tables
- Ofsted: Reports
- Head teacher: S. Scott
- Gender: Mixed
- Age: 4 to 11
- Enrolment: 265
- Houses: [Water], [Air], [Earth] and [Fire]
- Colours: Royal blue sweatshirts, white shirts and black/dark grey trousers/skirts.
- Website: https://www.ellisonboultersacademy.co.uk/

Ellison Boulters Church of England Primary Academy is situated in Scothern, Lincolnshire, England, on Sudbrooke Road. It has around 270 pupils, and accepts them mainly from the village of Scothern and the neighbouring villages of Langworth and Sudbrooke. Pupils are accepted from some distance outside this three-village catchment area for which it was built, as a result of which a place at the school for local children is not guaranteed.

== History ==
The school was built in 1988/89 and opened in September 1989. The old Scothern and Langworth schools were closed by Lincolnshire County Council in July 1989 (two years after Scothern School's 150th anniversary) and the pupils transferred to the new school on Sudbrooke Road.

There was controversy over the siting of the new school in the mid-1980s, the villages of Scothern and Sudbrooke each claiming to be the most appropriate place for the school. After months of disagreement, lobbying and legal challenges, a crucial vote of Lincolnshire County Councillors in March 1986 settled the issue and it was decided to go ahead with the original proposals for the Scothern site.

=== The formative years ===
The new combined school opened in 1989 with Len Clarke as head teacher. He was succeeded in the position by Andy Craven.

=== Oil blow out ===
On Tuesday 3 May 1994 an oil blow out took place near Scothern, from the Welton oil field. The school was 220 yards (200 m) from the oil field, with children being sprayed with oil in the lunchtime. Candecca paid out compensation.

=== Recent history ===
In recent years, however, whilst other local schools such as William Farr School in Welton and those in Nettleham have improved their performance in the official Department for Children, Schools and Families (DCSF) league tables, Ellison Boulters has fallen back in its relative performance. After the departure of the heads referred to above and since the arrival of the current head Jenny Wheeldon, the school's position in the performance tables and its results have fallen dramatically. Its aggregate score in the 2006 DCSF tables (see external links below) had fallen to below that of around 25 (50 in 2007) other primary schools in the county, and its value added score put it in the bottom quarter. Results have continued to deteriorate between 2004 and 2007, as shown by the table below, and whilst schools in Lincolnshire have improved their aggregate performance each year, Ellison Boulters School has achieved a lower outcome in each successive year.

Until the change of policy introduced by the current head, almost all children moved from Ellison Boulters to the comprehensive William Farr School at age 11. The policy now is to encourage children to take the 11+ with a view to Grammar School entrance, normally Queen Elizabeth's Grammar School, Horncastle, though the 2009 league tables show that William Farr School still achieves better A-level results.

The school is now an academy, and is independent of local authority control.

== Ofsted inspection reports ==
The 2001 Ofsted inspection report rated the school as "excellent", commenting in its summary: "This is an excellent school that has many areas of strength and no significant weaknesses in any aspect of its work., The 2006 Ofsted inspection judged the overall effectiveness of the school "Grade 2 (Good)", and the report commented "... in some lessons, the work does not closely meet the needs of all learners, especially the most able. This explains why progress is generally good, rather than outstanding"

An interim assessment in 2009 reaffirmed this judgement, deferring a full inspection until 2011, when the inspectors judged the school to be outstanding.
