= Snelland =

Village and civil parish in the West Lindsey district of Lincolnshire, England

Coordinates: 53.311063°N 0.384163°W

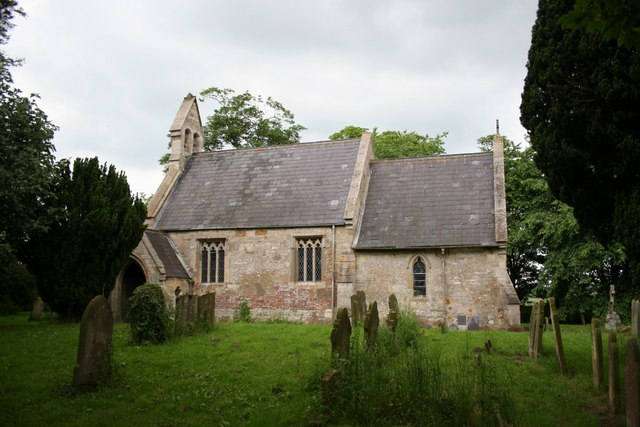
- All Saints' Church, Snelland

- Location within Lincolnshire
- Population: 91 (2001)
- OS grid reference: TF077805
  - London: 130 mi (210 km) S
- District: West Lindsey
- Shire county: Lincolnshire
- Region: East Midlands
- Country: England
- Sovereign state: United Kingdom
- Post town: Lincoln
- Postcode district: LN3
- Police: Lincolnshire
- Fire: Lincolnshire
- Ambulance: East Midlands
- UK Parliament: Gainsborough

Snelland is a village and civil parish in the West Lindsey district of Lincolnshire, England. It is situated approximately 9 miles (14 km) north-east from the city and county town of Lincoln and about 5 miles (8 km) from the town of Market Rasen. The civil parish includes the hamlet of Swinthorpe. The population at the 2011 census was included in the civil parish of Friesthorpe.

Snelland is listed in the Domesday Book of 1086 as "Sneleslunt", with seven households. The nearby deserted medieval village of Swinthorpe is listed as "Sonetorp", with three households. There is evidence that a Cistercian grange existed at Swinthorpe, attached to Kirkstead Abbey.

The parish church is a Grade II listed building built of limestone and dedicated to All Saints. It dates from the 12th century when the original church was constructed. However, it was likely reconstructed in the 15th century and then it was restored and largely rebuilt in 1863 by Edward Browning of Stamford. It was rebuilt in the early Decorated style. It has a bell gable which contains two bells. However, some of the original building remains with the south wall being the earliest part of the present building. Two windows on the south of the nave are in the late Decorated style of about 1440. Two further windows, of the same period were moved from their original positions during the later rebuilding of 1863. The first window is now the north-east window of the aisle. The second is a smaller window which is now in the Vestry and has been cut from a single stone. The Lincolnshire Architectural Society believes that this would have originally been positioned low as a side window in the chancel and would have served as a "leper's window". Aside from the windows, some medieval heads also remain from the earlier church.

The rectory - which is next to the church - was built in 1862 and is now a private residence.

Snelland railway station opened in the village in 1848, and closed in 1965. It is built of Ancaster stone. The station is now a private residence.

Prior to 1920, much of the farm land in Snelland and associated buildings were owned by the Porcelli-Cust family. The estate was auctioned in August 1920 after the death of Alice Marian Porcelli-Cust, the widow of Lt.-Col. Allan Roger Charles Porcelli-Cust. The Cust family had hitherto been very active in Snelland and was responsible for some of the building, including the church.
