= Snelland railway station =

Former railway station in England

Coordinates: 53.3105°N 0.3899°W

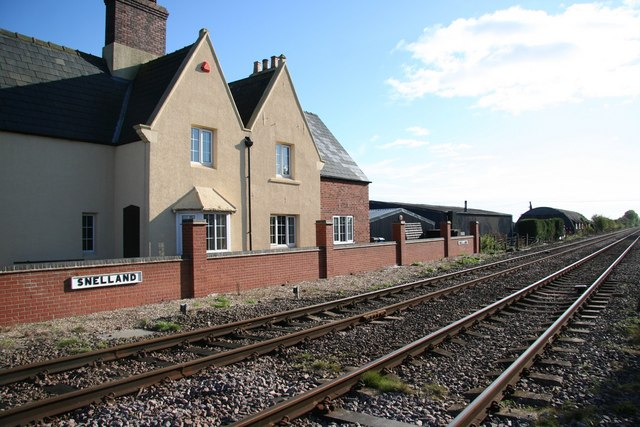
Station House, Snelland Site of former station

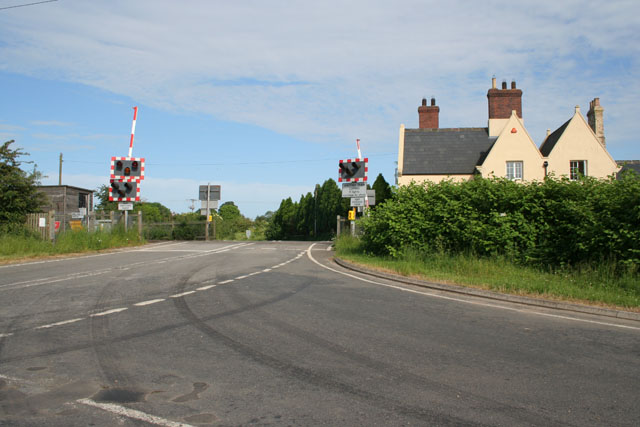
Level crossing, Snelland Site of former station

Snelland railway station was a station in Snelland, Lincolnshire, opened in 1848 as part of the Sheffield and Lincolnshire Extension Railway. and closed in 1965.

Preceding station	Disused railways	Following station
Langworth	Great Central Railway	Wickenby
