= No. 626 Squadron RAF =

- Active: 7 November 1943 – 14 October 1945
- Country: United Kingdom
- Branch: Royal Air Force
- Type: Inactive
- Role: Bomber Squadron
- Base: RAF Wickenby
- Mottos: To Strive and not to Yield

Insignia
- Squadron Badge heraldry: On the waves of the sea, an ancient ship, sails furled, charged on the bow with an eye
- Squadron Codes: UM (Nov 1943 – Oct 1945)

Aircraft flown
- Bomber: Avro Lancaster four-engined heavy bomber

No. 626 Squadron RAF was a heavy bomber squadron of the Royal Air Force from 1943 to 1945.

== History ==
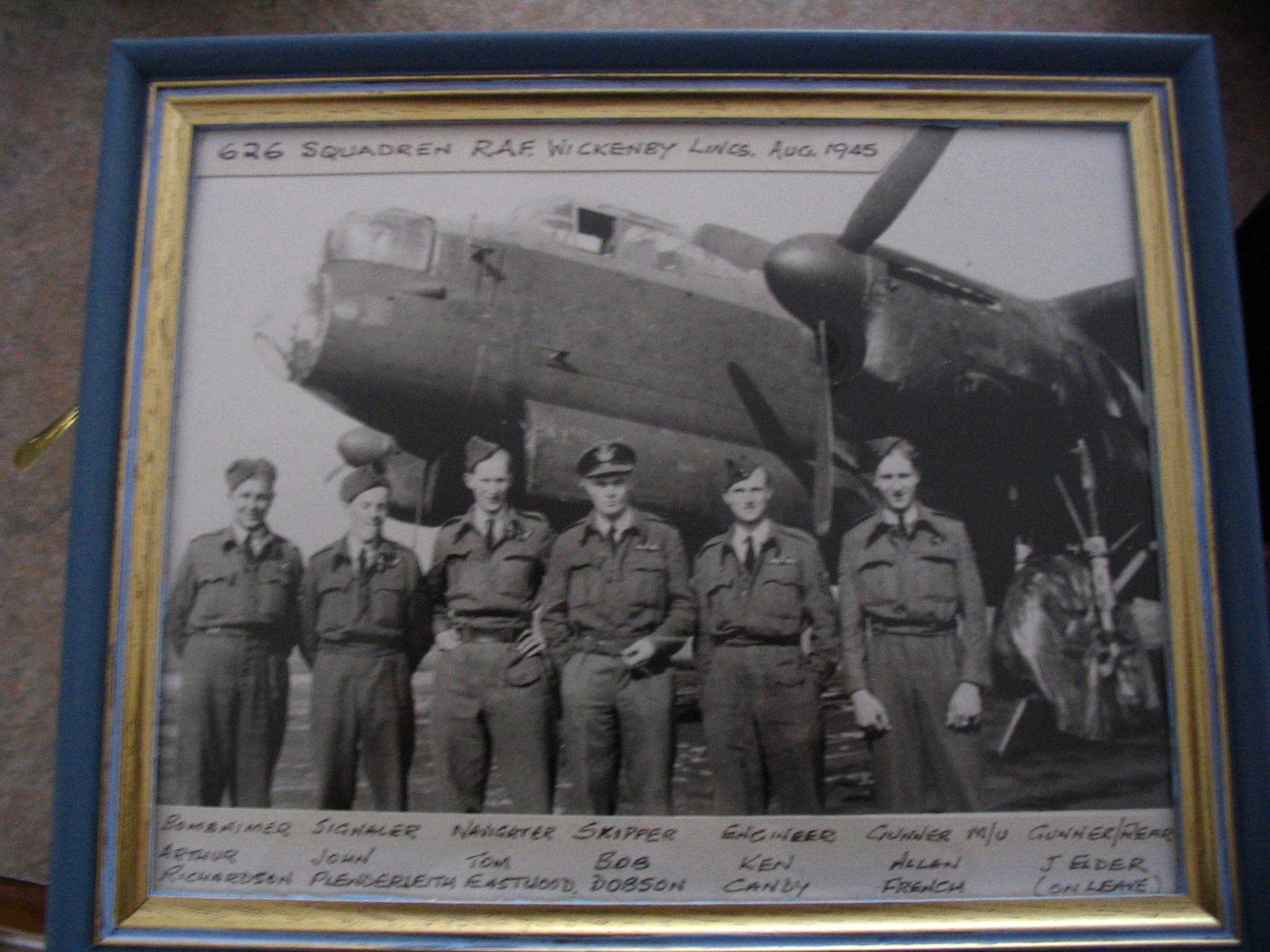
Members of the 626 squadron

The squadron was formed on 7 November 1943 at RAF Wickenby from C Flight of No. 12 Squadron. It operated in the strategic bombing role with the Avro Lancaster. It was disbanded on 14 October 1945, having spent the last months of the war on food droppings (Operation Manna) and transport duties (Operation Exodus), repatriating former prisoners of war and bringing British troops home from Italy.

=== First operational mission ===
10/11 November 1943

- 7 Lancasters bombed Modane

=== Last operational mission ===
25 April 1945

- 14 Lancasters bombed Obersalzberg

=== Last mission before V.E. day ===
7 May 1945

- 19 Lancasters dropped supplies to the Dutch in Rotterdam

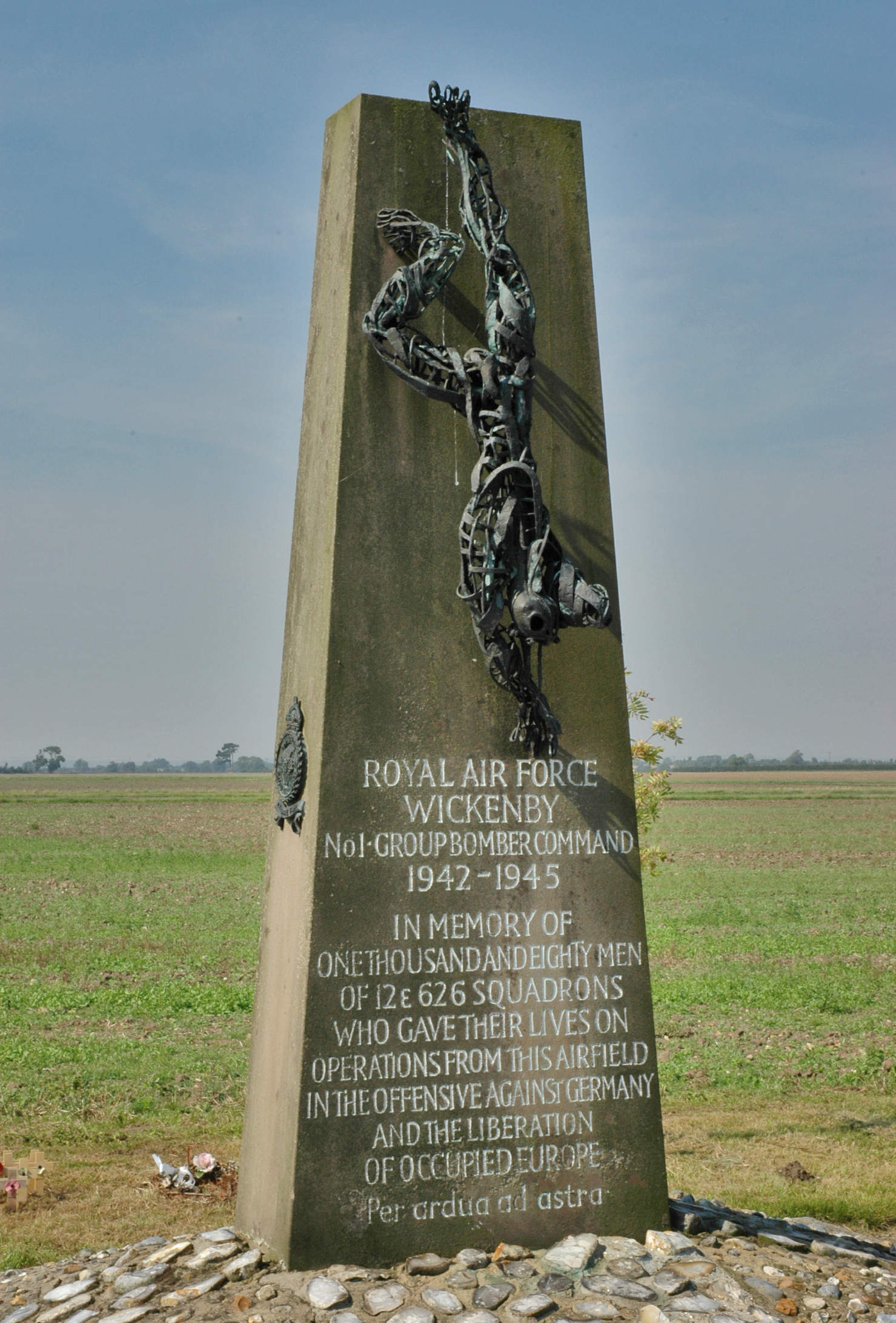
RAF Wickenby Memorial.

The squadron flew 2,728 sorties during the Second World War for the loss of 49 aircraft.

== Aircraft operated ==
Aircraft operated by No. 626 Squadron RAF
From	To	Aircraft	Variant
November 1943	October 1945	Avro Lancaster	Mks. I & III

== Squadron bases ==
Base used by No. 626 Squadron RAF
From	To	Name
November 1943	October 1945	RAF Wickenby, Lincolnshire

== Notable personnel ==
- Michael Bentine – Intelligence Officer
- Colin Tapley – Flying Control Officer
- Eric Simms – bomb-aimer
- Jack Currie, Lancaster (later Mosquito) pilot, writer, broadcaster and artist
- Stewart Jacques - Flight Sergeant

== See also ==
- List of Royal Air Force aircraft squadrons
