= Lincoln Bishop University =

Public university in Lincoln, England

Coordinates: 53.244°N 0.537°W

- Coat of Arms
- Former names: Diocesan Training School for Mistresses; Lincoln Diocesan Training College; Bishop Grosseteste College; Bishop Grosseteste University College; Bishop Grosseteste University
- Motto: Latin: Ne omnia sibi habeat
- Motto in English: Not all things to oneself
- Type: Public
- Established: 1862: Diocesan Training School for Mistresses; 2006: power to award own degrees 2012: full university status
- Affiliations: Cathedrals Group
- Religious affiliation: Anglican
- Chancellor: Tracy Borman
- Vice-Chancellor: Andrew Gower
- Chair of University Council: Bob Walder
- Academic staff: 101
- Students: 2,360 (2024/25)
- Undergraduates: 1,845 (2024/25)
- Postgraduates: 515 (2024/25)
- Location: Lincoln, Lincolnshire, England
- Campus: Urban and suburban
- Colours: Deep purple
- Website: www.lincolnbishop.ac.uk

Lincoln Bishop University (LBU), known until 2025 as Bishop Grosseteste University, is a public university in the city of Lincoln, England. LBU was established as a teacher training college for the Diocese of Lincoln in 1862. It gained taught degree awarding powers in 2012, applied for full university status, and was granted on 3 December 2012. It has around 2,300 full-time students enrolled on a variety of programmes and courses.

== History ==
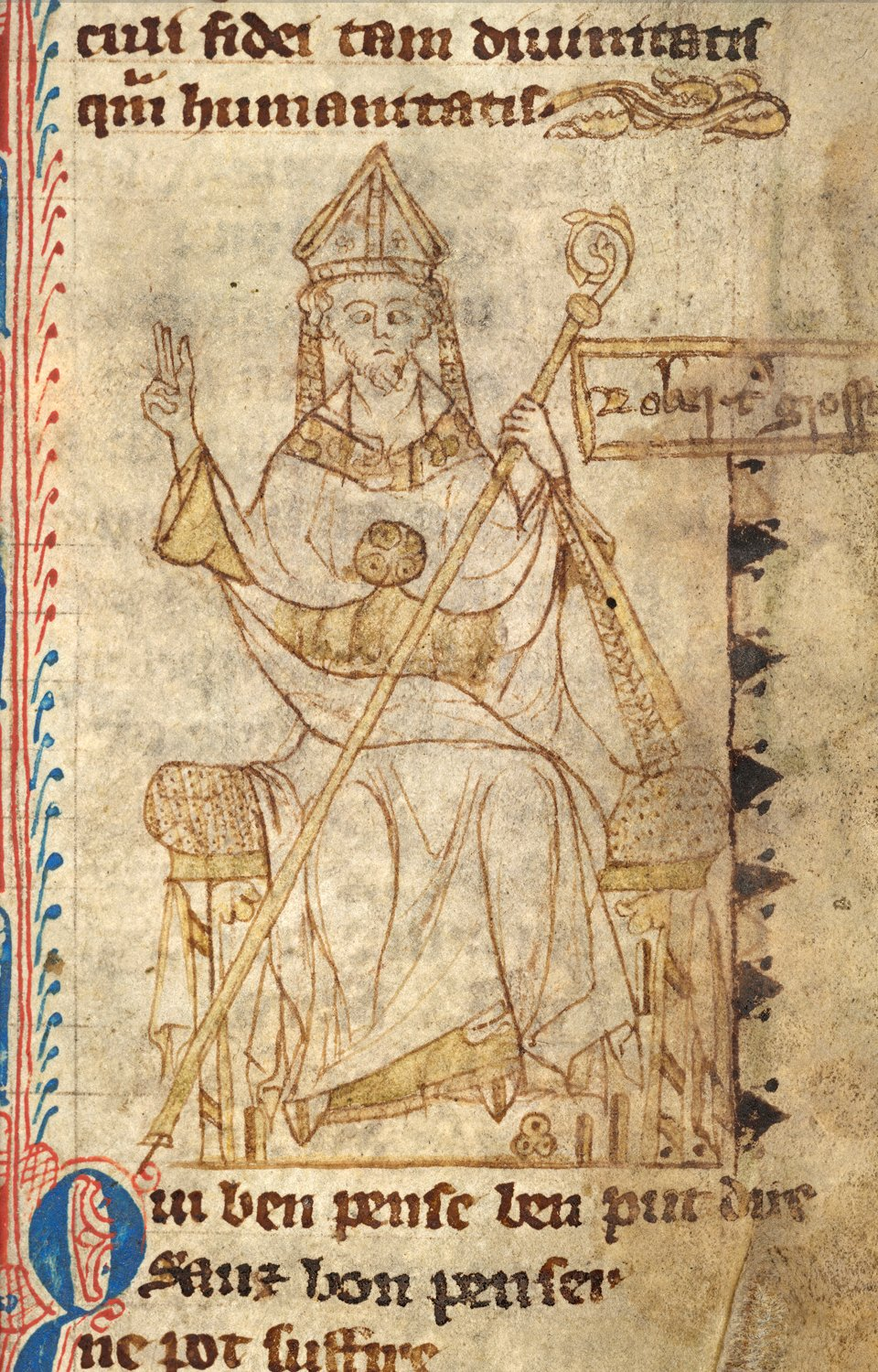
Robert Grosseteste, Bishop of Lincoln and scholar

Lincoln Diocesan Training School for Mistresses was founded in 1862. It occupied the premises of an earlier, unsuccessful training establishment for female teachers, which had been built in 1842 with a chapel, lecture rooms and a school for teaching practice. It was later renamed Lincoln Diocesan Training College and, to mark the centenary in 1962, was renamed Bishop Grosseteste College.

The college took its name from Robert Grosseteste (also known as Robert Greathead and Robert of Lincoln), a 13th-century statesman, scholastic philosopher, theologian, scientist and Bishop of Lincoln.

It had only female residents until September 1968. From around 1963 there had been non-residents who were male.

The college began awarding degrees of Bachelor of Education (BEd), originally validated by the University of Nottingham. From 1987, degrees were validated by the University of Hull and BEd students spent one of the four years of their course reading their main subject at Hull.

In 1991, the college stopped awarding BEd degrees and began instead to award the degree of Bachelor of Arts with Honours and Qualified Teacher Status (BA(Hons)QTS). In 2003, a Validation Agreement was signed with the University of Leicester.

In 2006, the college was awarded university college status as Bishop Grosseteste University College (BGUC). 2012 saw a change in legislation regarding the use of the title university, allowing higher education establishments with more than 1,000 students to apply for university status. BGUC applied for the University title in June 2012 and was renamed Bishop Grosseteste University in December 2013. In 2022, historian Tracy Borman was named Chancellor of Bishop Grosseteste University.

In March 2024, the university announced plans to change its name to Lincoln Bishop University, which received mixed reactions. The university assumed the new name in September 2025.

Subject to regulatory approval, it will become Lincoln Bishop University Limited and part of the Global University Systems group as part of a takeover.

== Campus ==
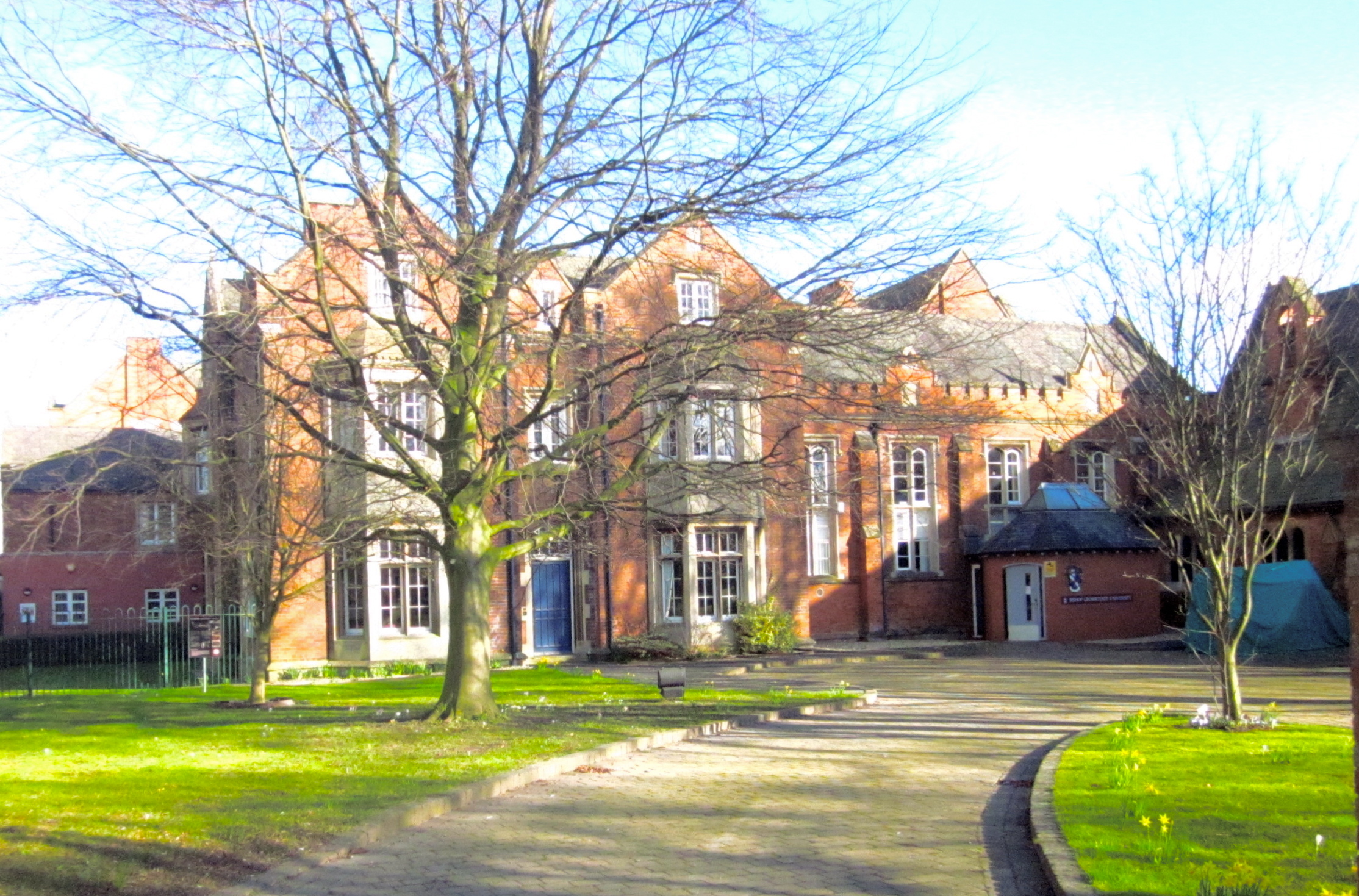
Original building of 1841 at Lincoln Bishop University

The university is on a single-site campus in uphill Lincoln, a short walk from the historic Bailgate area, the Cathedral and Castle. The oldest buildings are on the Newport frontage, with the earliest, a building of 1841, in a Tudor revival (or "Tudorbethan") style. It is in brick with stone dressings and has gabled dormers. In 1861 an extension range, in a similar but plainer style, was placed at right angles away from the road. In 1862, Sir Arthur Blomfield designed the simple and plainer chapel, which stands between these buildings and the road. In recent years the campus has seen many new developments and new facilities.

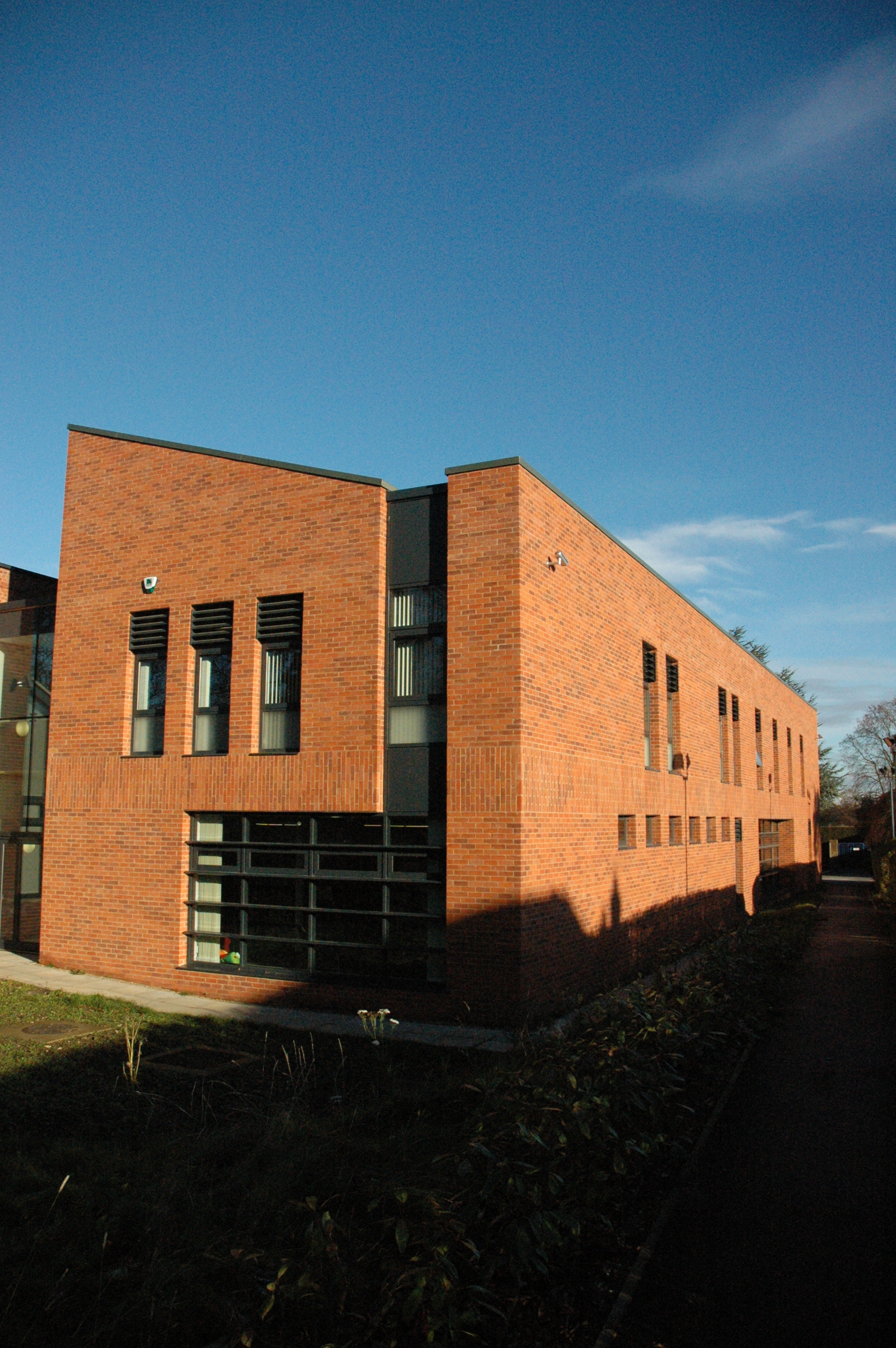
Library at Bishop Grosseteste

An extension to the Sibthorp Library (the Cornerstone Building) was completed in 2012 and officially opened by Anne, Princess Royal in 2013. The development doubled study space available to students and incorporated Student Support services within the same building. It also provided dedicated space for two unique library collections: the Teaching Resources Collection and the Lincolnshire Collection. The Library's Lincolnshire Collection was greatly augmented in 2014 with books donated by the Society for Lincolnshire History and Archaeology.

In 2012 the on-campus Bishop Greaves Theatre was upgraded with state-of-the-art cinema equipment and became The Venue. It holds regular screenings of both popular Hollywood releases and more obscure independent films, and is also home to the Lincoln Film Society. The Venue is also in use as a theatre, particularly by the university's drama students and its own BG Touring Ltd.

In 2013 the main entrance to the campus was moved from Newport to Longdales Road and, as a result, the main reception was relocated to the Robert Hardy Building. The space previously occupied by main reception was upgraded to a quiet study area for students and the previous external entrance was locked.

Extensive development work took place on the university campus during 2013, refurbishing existing accommodation and providing a new £4.3m hall of residence. A new dining facility was completed in 2013. Development of Constance Stewart Hall during 2016 – 2017 added teaching rooms in an extension designed by LK2 Architects.

=== Student accommodation ===
There are 293 places in the on-campus halls of residence. The on-campus halls of residence are available to first years and those with disabilities. Some second or third years live in halls as Senior Residents, providing guidance and a 24/7 on-call service to the first-year residents. All accommodation benefits from free wi-fi access, which is also available throughout the campus as well as onsite security.

Constance Stewart Hall (CSH), erected in the 1950s, was renovated and upgraded to provide self-catering accommodation and improved facilities for students. The existing Wickham Hall and Nelson Hall accommodation blocks were demolished. Wickham Hall was replaced with a larger accommodation building of the same name, and Nelson Hall was replaced with a new dining facility. As there is a high proportion of mature students and local students, few first years need to live in; most tend to board in private homes.

In 2023 the University ranked 1st in the UK for Halls and Accommodation at the Whatuni Student Choice Awards.

== Statistics ==
Sex ratio (M:F): 33:67
Applications per place: 3
Points range: 96–112
Non-continuation rate: 8%
Unemployed after 6 months: 7%
Access fund: £75,000

== Academic profile ==
Rankings
National rankings
- Complete (2027): 122
- Times / Sunday Times (2027): 86

Lincoln Bishop University offers apprenticeships, doctoral study, and foundation and honours degrees at undergraduate and postgraduate level. This includes multiple routes into teaching such as BA, BSc and Postgraduate Certificate in Education (PGCE). As well as joint honours options, many subjects can be studied as major/minor combinations. Teaching is through lectures, seminars, workshops, practicals and work-related placements. The university awards foundation degrees in education, childhood and youthwork, BA degrees in 17 subjects, including primary education, SENDI and early childhood studies, and BSc degrees in 4 subjects. As well as degrees with QTS, the university awards PGCEs, MA degrees in 8 subjects and doctorates. Doctoral study (conducted in partnership with the University of Leicester) leads to either a PhD or an EdD.

The university is engaged with an Initial Teacher Education partnership with New College Stamford and Lincoln College, in which students are trained to teach whilst teaching in the maintained sector. The provision was branded Good by Ofsted in all four judgements (Overall effectiveness; Outcomes for trainees; Quality of training; Quality of leadership and management.)

In 2023 the University ranked 3rd in the UK for Graduate Prospects at the Whatuni Student Choice Awards.

== Student life ==
The University has an active Students' Union, commonly referred to as LBUSU. There are two full-time sabbatical officers, a CEO, a part-time volunteer team of 15 students and 6 support staff focused on administration and communications. They provide academic and pastoral support, entertainment and activities throughout the year. A key function of the union is to provide representational services to the students of BGU with a Course Reps scheme, in which there is a representative from each course who provides feedback and shapes the development of the course structure.

Lincoln Bishop University Students' Union represents the students in the British Universities and Colleges Sport leagues, as well as offering training for participation. All the current sport clubs compete in their respective BUCS leagues. The netball team has won successive promotions since its inauguration, while the rugby union and badminton teams made their débuts in the 2012 – 13 season. The university has a sport and fitness centre, consisting of a non-standard dimension sports hall, a gym with cardio and resistance machines as well as a weights area, and a field with two football pitches.

In 2023 the University ranked 1st in the UK for Student Support at the Whatuni Student Choice Awards.

== Notable people ==
=== Notable alumni ===
- David Pugh, West End theatre producer
- Jade Etherington, paralympic ski silver medallist

=== Notable academics ===
- Muriel Robinson, principal 2003–2012, vice-chancellor 2012–2013

== See also ==
- Armorial of UK universities
- College of Education
- List of universities in the UK
