= Scothern =

Village in Lincolnshire, England

Coordinates: 53.284060°N 0.449769°W

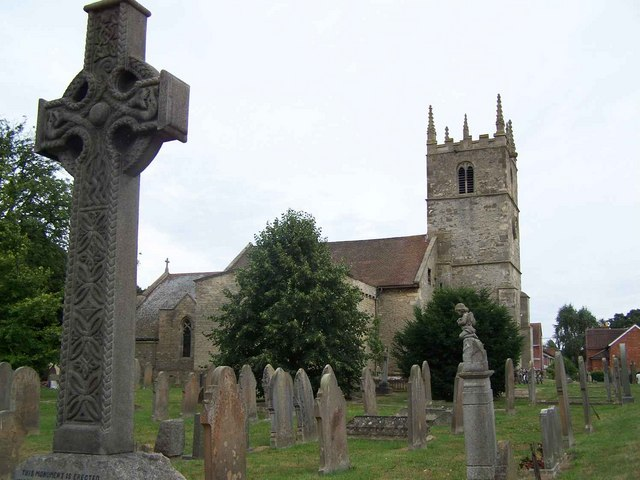
- Church of St Germain, Scothern

- Location within Lincolnshire
- Population: 860 (2011)
- OS grid reference: TF034774
  - London: 125 mi (201 km) S
- District: West Lindsey
- Shire county: Lincolnshire
- Region: East Midlands
- Country: England
- Sovereign state: United Kingdom
- Post town: Lincoln
- Postcode district: LN2
- Police: Lincolnshire
- Fire: Lincolnshire
- Ambulance: East Midlands
- UK Parliament: Gainsborough

Scothern is a small village and civil parish in the West Lindsey district of Lincolnshire, England. It is situated 6 miles (10 km) north-east of the county town of Lincoln, and has approximately 1000 inhabitants (892 according to the 2001 Census). At the 2011 census the population had reduced to 860 but further growth took place after that date.

The place-name 'Scothern' is first attested in the Domesday Book of 1086, where it appears as Scotstorne and Scotorne. The name means "the thorn-bush of the Scot or Scots".

By the fifteenth century it was listed in church records as Sconethorne, an early reference to the local scone, made from local wheat flour and saffron. Up to the mid seventeenth century an annual festival took place on the village green to celebrate the scone, and Scothern's then links with the saffron growing areas of Essex, (notably Saffron Walden). Since that time, which coincides with the time at which the Marfleet family (from whom the original Saffron recipe derived) left the area, following the great famine of 1624, the festival has ceased to be observed. A crocus symbol can still be seen high up in the tower of the church.

The neighbouring villages of Sudbrooke, Dunholme, Nettleham and Welton have been redeveloped over recent years, with the addition of new housing estates. Scothern, however, remained substantially unchanged, the only development other than the odd infill house until the turn of the century being the Juniper Drive/Alders development of around 35 houses in the early 1990s. Further developments have since taken place such as the st. Germain's road development

After changes in the planning laws following a change of government in 2010, the preparatory work for a neighbourhood development plan was commenced by the Parish Council in 2012 with a view to protecting the village against unplanned, uncontrolled development. The work was halted by the Parish Council in 2013 after a change of clerk and chair, as a result of which some further development has been approved by West Lindsey District Council. Realising their mistake, the Parish Council restarted the neighbourhood development plan process in 2015 and the Scothern Neighbourhood Plan was formally adopted in 2017. As at October 2023 West Lindsey District Council was in the process of consulting on the Scothern Neighbourhood Plan Review, which updates the 2017 plan.

Scothern is an ecclesiastical parish in the Diocese of Lincoln. The parish church on Church Street, dedicated to St Germain, is a Grade II* listed building. There is a village war memorial, dedicated to the soldiers from the village who died in the World Wars.

Due to falling congregations, St Germain's now opens in rotation with other local churches in Dunholme and Welton. The regular congregation now stands at less than 10, largely older people, leading to concerns as to the maintenance costs of the building and its future as a church.

Scothern's primary school is Ellison Boulters Academy, to which pupils travel from the neighbouring villages of Sudbrooke and Langworth.

The village cricket club, formed in 1965, has teams competing at all youth levels. Two Senior sides on Saturday and a Sunday side compete in county league and cup competitions, while two midweek sides compete in the Lincoln and District Midweek League. Scothern Players amateur dramatics society typically perform twice a year.

There is a small garden centre, with a tea room, in the village, but the shop and post office closed in March 1999. The local St Lukes nursing home holds up to 30 patients. Scothern's public house, the Bottle and Glass, was featured in The Telegraph in March 2008, when Prince William visited the pub for cider and a pie with his friends from the Red Arrows. Recent developments at the pub, and possible redevelopment of land currently occupied by the parish church, has caused local concern, and a consideration that the village could become a conservation Area.

Although the Post Office closed in 1999, Scothern is served by mobile shops selling meat and fish, and by a mobile fish and chip van. There is also a small self-service shop selling vegetables and other sundries.
