= Langworth =

Village in Lincolnshire, England

Coordinates: 53.274391°N 0.408270°W

- Location within Lincolnshire
- OS grid reference: TF0624076449
  - London: 125 mi (201 km) S
- District: West Lindsey
- Shire county: Lincolnshire
- Region: East Midlands
- Country: England
- Sovereign state: United Kingdom
- Post town: Lincoln
- Postcode district: LN3
- Police: Lincolnshire
- Fire: Lincolnshire
- Ambulance: East Midlands
- UK Parliament: Gainsborough

Langworth is a small village in the West Lindsey district of Lincolnshire, England. It is situated 6 miles (10 km) north-east from the city and county town of Lincoln, and on the A158 Lincoln to Skegness road. It is in the civil parish of Barlings.

== Community ==
The village has one public house and two garages.

The Langworth railway station, on the Great Central Railway Grimsby to Lincoln line, has closed, but the line still runs through the village, crossing the A158.

The village is in an area prone to flooding. The Environment Agency gives flood warnings for the Barlings Eau waterway, which runs just north-west of the village. Particularly extensive flooding occurred in 2007.

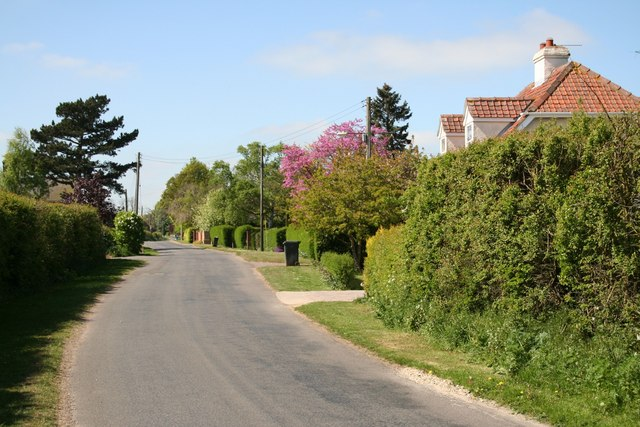
Barlings Lane, Langworth

School

Langworth's Boulters primary school closed in 1989, after which its pupils transferred to the newly built Ellison Boulters School in neighbouring Scothern.

Church

Langworth's church is dedicated to St Hugh. The church is a 1960–62 rebuilding, by Haynes and Johnson of Brigg, of the Walmsgate Hall chapel, itself built in 1901. The material from the original chapel could not be used although the previous footprint was kept, and lengthened. The barrel vault roof construction, the surrounds to the windows, and sliding doors with their handles at the west end was retained from the earlier chapel. The original font, organ, altar canopy and bronze lamps, and a plaque to Dallas-Yorke, son of Thomas Yorke, to whom the chapel was a memorial, remain from the original church. The plaster decoration, a combination of the Art Nouveau and Pre-Raphaelite styles, was lost in the rebuilding; Pevsner's view was that with the decoration "the chapel was one of the outstanding ensembles in England of the style of 1900".

Village store

Langworth had a village store with a full time post office until the 2008/2009 post office closures. The village organised a campaign to keep it open. The campaign included a web campaign (www.savelangworthpostoffice.co.uk, which is no longer online) and direct action, including a protest in front of the Department for Business, Enterprise and Regulatory Reform and a pedestrian crossing protest, which caused long tailbacks on the A158. The campaign failed to reach its goal and Post office Ltd closed the Langworth branch, resulting in the village store closing.

There is now a post office outreach service open in the Langworth memorial hall three times a week.
