= List of statutory instruments of the United Kingdom, 1991 =

This is an incomplete list of the 2,945 statutory instruments published in the United Kingdom in the year 1991.

== Statutory instruments ==
=== 1-499 ===
==== 1–100 ====
- Valuation and Community Charge Tribunals (Amendment)(London) Regulations 1991 SI 1991/1
- Farm Diversification Grant (Variation) Scheme 1991 SI 1991/2
- Apple Orchard Grubbing Up Regulations 1991 SI 1991/3
- Occupational Pension Schemes (Transitional Provisions and Savings) Amendment Regulations 1991 SI 1991/4
- Food Protection (Emergency Prohibitions) (Radioactivity in Sheep) (Wales) Order 1991 SI 1991/5
- Food Protection (Emergency Prohibitions) (Radioactivity in Sheep) (England) Order 1991 SI 1991/6
- Blood Tests (Evidence of Paternity) (Amendment) Regulations 1991 SI 1991/12
- Companies (Defective Accounts) (Authorised Person) Order 1991 SI 1991/13
- Act of Adjournal (Consolidation Amendment) (Extradition Rules and Backing of Irish Warrants) 1991 SI 1991/19
- Food Protection (Emergency Prohibitions) (Radioactivity in Sheep) Order 1991 SI 1991/20
- Act of Sederunt (Applications in the Sheriff Court in respect of Defective Company Accounts) 1991 SI 1991/24
- London-Holyhead Trunk Road (A5) (Ty-nant to Dinmael) Order 1991 (SI 1991/26)
- Industrial Training (Construction Board) Order 1964 (Amendment) Order 1991 (SI 1991/28)
- Banking Act 1987 (Exempt Transactions) (Amendment) Regulations 1991 (SI 1991/29)
- Cholderton (Pipelaying and Other Works) (Code of Practice) Order 1991 SI 1991/31
- Public Telecommunications System Designated (Cable Enfield Limited) Order 1991 SI 1991/32
- Public Telecommunications System Designated (Cable North (Forth District) Limited) (Falkirk and West Lothian) Order 1991 SI 1991/33
- Public Telecommunications System Designated (Cablevision Communications Company Limited) (Central Hertfordshire) Order 1991 SI 1991/34
- Buckinghamshire County Council Downhead Park to Willen Park (Canal Bridge) Scheme 1989 Confirmation Instrument 1991 SI 1991/37
- Buckinghamshire County Council H8 Standing Way (V8-V10) Dualling (Canal Bridge) Scheme 1990 Confirmation Instrument 1991 SI 1991/38
- Standard Community Charge (Scotland) Amendment Regulations 1991 SI 1991/41
- Non-Domestic Rates (Scotland) Regulations 1991 SI 1991/42
- Caledonian MacBrayne Limited (Arinagour Pier) Harbour Revision Order 1990 SI 1991/43
- Buckinghamshire County Council H5 Portway (V9-V10) Dualling (Canal Bridge) Scheme 1990 Confirmation Instrument 1991 SI 1991/45
- Community Charges (Registration) (Scotland) (No. 2) Amendment Regulations 1991 SI 1991/51
- Customs and Excise (Community Transit) (No.2) Regulations 1987 (Amendment) Regulations 1991 SI 1991/52
- General Medical Council (Registration (Fees) (Amendment) Regulations) Order of Council 1991 SI 1991/53
- Public Telecommunications System Designation (East London Telecommunications Limited) (Waltham Forest) Order 1991 SI 1991/54
- Public Telecommunication System Designation (Starside Network Limited) Order 1991 SI 1991/55
- Public Telecommunication System Designation (Stort Valley Cable Limited) (Harlow and Bishops Stortford) Order 1991 SI 1991/56
- Combined Probation Areas (Essex) Order 1991 SI 1991/57
- Export of Sheep (Prohibition) Order 1991 SI 1991/58
- Gaming (Amendment) Act 1990 (Commencement) Order 1991 SI 1991/59
- Gaming Act (Variation of Fees) Order 1991 SI 1991/60
- Lotteries (Gaming Board Fees) Order 1991 SI 1991/61
- Relevant Population (England) (Amendment) Regulations 1991 SI 1991/64
- Merchant Shipping (Pilot Boats) Regulations 1991 SI 1991/65
- Banking Act 1987 (Exempt Persons) Order 1991 SI 1991/66
- Combined Probation Areas (Cornwall) Order 1991 SI 1991/68
- Combined Probation Areas (Greater Manchester) Order 1991 SI 1991/69
- National Savings Bank (Amendment)Regulations 1991 SI 1991/72
- Premium Savings Bonds (Amendment) Regulations 1991 SI 1991/73
- Savings Certificates (Amendment) Regulations 1991 SI 1991/74
- Savings Certificates (Yearly Plan) (Amendment) Regulations 1991 SI 1991/75
- Savings Contracts (Amendment) Regulations 1991 SI 1991/76
- Immigration (Variation of Leave) Order 1991 SI 1991/77
- Local Government Superannuation (Scotland) Amendment Regulations 1991 SI 1991/78
- General Optical Council (Registration and Enrolment (Amendment No. 2) Rules) Order of Council 1991 SI 1991/79
- Housing Renovation etc. Grants (Prescribed Forms and Particulars) (Welsh Forms and Particulars) Regulations 1991 SI 1991/80
- Public Telecommunications System Designation (Cable Communications (Liverpool) Limited) Order 1991 SI 1991/81
- Public Telecommunication System Designation (Staffordshire Cable Limited) (Stoke-on-Trent and Newcastle under Lyme) Order 1991 SI 1991/82
- A30 Trunk Road (Okehampton to Launceston Improvement and Slip Roads) Order 1991 SI 1991/84
- A30 Trunk Road (Okehampton to Launceston Improvement)(Detrunking) Order 1991 SI 1991/85
- Electricity (Restrictive Trade Practices Act 1976) (Exemptions) Amendment Order 1991 SI 1991/88
- Employment Act 1990 (Commencement and Transitional Provisions) Amendment Order 1991 SI 1991/89
- Environmental Protection Act 1990 (Commencement No. 5) Order 1991 SI 1991/96
- Local Authorities (Capital Finance) (Rate of Discount for 1991/92) Regulations 1991 SI 1991/97
- Food Safety (Improvement and Prohibition-Prescribed Forms) Regulations 1991 SI 1991/100

== 101–200 ==
- Sealink (Transfer of Fishbourne Terminal) Harbour Revision Order 1991 SI 1991/106
- Sealink (Transfer of Ryde Pier) Harbour Revision Order 1991 (SI 1991/107)
- Sealink (Transfer of Landing Stage at Portsmouth Harbour) Harbour Revision Order 1991 SI 1991/108
- Northern Devon Healthcare National Health Service Trust (Establishment) Order 1991 SI 1991/109
- Food Protection (Emergency Prohibitions) (Lead in Cattle) (England) (No. 2) (Revocation) Order 1991 SI 1991/110
- Litter (Fixed Penalty Notices) Order 1991 SI 1991/111
- A158 Trunk Road (Lincolnshire) (Detrunking) Order 1991 SI 1991/112
- Ermine Street (A15) (North Lincolnshire) (Trunking) Order 1991 SI 1991/113
- Non-Domestic Rates (Scotland) (No.2) Regulations 1991 SI 1991/114
- River Awe Salmon Fishery District (Baits and Lures) Regulations 1991 SI 1991/116
- Public Telecommunication System Designation (Sheffield Cable Media Limited) Order 1991 SI 1991/117
- Community Charges and Non-Domestic Rating (Demand Notices) (Wales) (Amendment) Regulations 1991 SI 1991/118
- Petty Sessional Divisions (Essex) Order 1991 SI 1991/121
- Education (Grants) (Travellers and Displaced Persons) (Amendment) Regulations 1991 SI 1991/131
- Government Trading Act 1990 (Appointed Day) Order 1991 SI 1991/132
- A423 Trunk Road (Southam Bypass) Order 1990 SI 1991/133
- Bitton Light Railway Order 1991 (SI 1991/134)
- Nurses, Midwives and Health Visitors (Registration) Modification Rules Approved Order 1991 SI 1991/135
- Sea Fishing (Enforcement of Community Quota Measures) Order 1991 SI 1991/138
- Sea Fishing (Days in Port) Regulations 1991 SI 1991/139
- Community Charges (Administration and Enforcement) (Amendment) Regulations 1991 SI 1991/140
- Non-Domestic Rating (Collection and Enforcement) (Local Lists) (Amendment and Miscellaneous Provision) Regulations 1991 SI 1991/141
- Non-Domestic Rating (Collection and Enforcement) (Central Lists) (Amendment) Regulations 1991 SI 1991/142
- Act of Sederunt (Applications under Part VII of the Companies Act 1989) 1991 SI 1991/145
- Financial Assistance (Sewerage Improvements) (Scotland) Order 1991 SI 1991/146
- Town and Country Planning (General Development) (Scotland) Amendment Order 1991 SI 1991/147
- Community Charges and Non-Domestic Rating (Demand Notices) (England) Regulations 1991 SI 1991/148
- Community Charges and Non-Domestic Rating (Demand Notices) (City of London) Regulations 1991 SI 1991/149
- International Fund for Agricultural Development (Third Replenishment) Order 1991 SI 1991/150
- Returning Officers (Parliamentary Constituencies) (England and Wales) (Amendment) Order 1991 SI 1991/152
- Combined Probation Areas (Essex) (No. 2) Order 1991 SI 1991/156
- Building Standards (Relaxation by Local Authorities) (Scotland) Regulations 1991 SI 1991/158
- Building (Procedure) (Scotland) Amendment Regulations 1991 SI 1991/159
- Building (Forms) (Scotland) Regulations 1991 SI 1991/160
- M5 Birmingham-Exeter Motorway (Strensham Re-Located Northbound Service Area) Connecting Roads Scheme 1991 SI 1991/162
- Contracting-Out (Protection of Pensions) Regulations 1991 SI 1991/166
- Occupational Pension Schemes (Preservation of Benefit) Regulations 1991 SI 1991/167
- Occupational Pension Schemes (Revaluation) Regulations 1991 SI 1991/168
- Public Telecommunication System Designation (British Cable Services Limited) (Cardiff) Order 1991 SI 1991/172
- Public Telecommunication System Designation (United Artists Communications (South Thames Estuary) Limited) Order 1991 SI 1991/173
- City of London (Non-Domestic Rating Multiplier) Order 1991 SI 1991/182
- British Nationality (Fees) (Amendment) Regulations 1991 SI 1991/183
- Education (London Residuary Body) (Capital Money) Order 1991 SI 1991/184
- Rates and Precepts (Final Adjustments) Order 1991 SI 1991/185
- Value Added Tax Tribunals (Amendment) Rules 1991 SI 1991/186
- European Communities (Designation) Order 1991 SI 1991/187
- Transfer of Functions (Minister for the Civil Service and Treasury) Order 1991 SI 1991/188
- Air Navigation (Overseas Territories) (Amendment) Order 1991 SI 1991/189
- Foreign Compensation (Financial Provisions) Order 1991 SI 1991/190
- Broadcasting Act 1990 (Guernsey) Order 1991 SI 1991/191
- Broadcasting Act 1990 (Isle of Man) Order 1991 SI 1991/192
- Broadcasting Act 1990 (Jersey) Order 1991 SI 1991/193
- Health and Personal Social Services(Northern Ireland) Order 1991 SI 1991/194
- Health and Personal Social Services(Northern Ireland Consequential Amendments)Order 1991 SI 1991/195
- Redundancy Fund (Abolition) (Northern Ireland) Order 1991 SI 1991/196
- Road Traffic (Amendment) (Northern Ireland) Order 1991 SI 1991/197
- Civil Aviation (Canadian Navigation Services) (Third Amendment) Regulations 1991 SI 1991/198
- Price Indications (Method of Payment) Regulations 1991 SI 1991/199
- Financial Services Act 1986 (Delegation) Order 1991 SI 1991/200

== 201–300 ==
- Copyright Tribunal (Amendment) Rules 1991 SI 1991/201
- Public Telecommunication System Designation (Cable Communications (St Helens and Knowsley) Limited) Order 1991 SI 1991/202
- Public Telecommunication System Designation (Cablevision North Bedfordshire Limited) Order 1991 SI 1991/203
- Isles of Scilly (Functions) Order 1991 SI 1991/205
- Price Marking (Petrol) (Amendment) Order 1991 SI 1991/206
- Offshore Installations (Safety Zones) Order 1991 SI 1991/207
- Avon and Somerset Police (Amalgamation) (Amendment) Order 1991 SI 1991/209
- Valuation and Community Charge Tribunals (Amendment) (Allowances) Regulations 1991 SI 1991/210
- Personal Community Charge (Relief) (Wales) Regulations 1991 SI 1991/212
- Drivers' Hours (Passenger and Goods Vehicles) (Exemption) Regulations 1991 SI 1991/213
- Community Drivers' Hours (Passenger and Goods Vehicles) (Temporary Exception) Regulations 1991 SI 1991/214
- Upper Spey and Associated Waters Protection (Renewal) Order 1991 SI 1991/215
- Community Charges (Information Concerning Social Security) Amendment Regulations 1991 SI 1991/223
- Community Charges (Information Concerning Social Security) (Scotland) Amendment Regulations 1991 SI 1991/224
- Kent County Council (Dartford Creek Bridge) Scheme 1990 Confirmation Instrument 1991 SI 1991/225
- Health Education Authority (Establishment and Constitution) Amendment Order 1991 SI 1991/226
- Race Relations Code of Practice (Rented Housing) Order 1991 SI 1991/227
- Non-Domestic Rating (Collection and Enforcement) (Local Lists) (Amendment and Miscellaneous Provision) (Amendment) Regulations 1991 SI 1991/228
- Public Telecommunication System Designation (Cablevision (Scotland) plc) (Edinburgh) Order 1991 SI 1991/229
- Personal Community Charge (Reductions) (England) Regulations 1991 SI 1991/230
- Local Government Act 1988 (Defined Activities) (Competition) (Wales) Regulations 1991 SI 1991/232
- Assured and Protected Tenancies (Lettings to Students) (Amendment) Regulations 1991 SI 1991/233
- Community Charge Benefits (General) Amendment Regulations 1991 SI 1991/234
- Housing Benefit (General) Amendment Regulations 1991 SI 1991/235
- Income Support (General) Amendment Regulations 1991 SI 1991/236
- Sealink (Transfer of Folkestone Harbour) Harbour Revision Order 1991 SI 1991/237
- Whitehaven Harbour Revision Order 1991 SI 1991/238
- Plant Health (Great Britain) (Amendment) Order 1991 SI 1991/240
- Local Government Finance (Miscellaneous Provisions) (England) Order 1991 SI 1991/241
- Community Charges and Non-Domestic Rating(Miscellaneous Provisions) (England) Regulations 1991 SI 1991/242
- Local Government (Direct Labour Organisations) (Competition) (Scotland) Amendment Regulations 1991 SI 1991/243
- Housing Support Grant (Scotland) Order 1991 SI 1991/244
- Housing Support Grant (Scotland) Variation Order 1991 SI 1991/245
- Social Fund Cold Weather Payments (General) Amendment Regulations 1991 SI 1991/251
- Goods Vehicles (Plating and Testing) (Amendment) (No.1) Regulations 1991 SI 1991/252
- Motor Vehicles (Tests) (Amendment) (No. 1) Regulations 1991 SI 1991/253
- Fire Precautions (Sub-surface Railway Stations) (Amendment) Regulations 1991 SI 1991/259
- Statutory Sick Pay Act 1991 (Commencement) Order 1991 SI 1991/260
- Local Government Act 1988 (Defined Activities) (Exemption) (Wales) Order 1991 SI 1991/262
- Industrial Training (Offshore Petroleum Board) (Revocation) Order 1991 SI 1991/263
- Berkshire, Buckinghamshire, Hampshire, Oxfordshire and Surrey (County Boundaries) Order 1991 SI 1991/264
- Avon and Gloucestershire (County Boundaries) Order 1991 SI 1991/271
- Act of Sederunt (Rules of the Court of Session Amendment No. 1) (Fees of Solicitors) 1991 SI 1991/272
- Gaming Act (Variation of Fees) (Scotland) Order 1991 SI 1991/273
- Lyon Court and Office Fees (Variation) Order 1991 SI 1991/274
- Community Health Councils (Amendment) Regulations 1991 SI 1991/275
- Building Societies (General Charge and Fees) Regulations 1991 SI 1991/277
- Valuation for Rating (Former Enterprise Zones) Regulations 1991 SI 1991/278
- Public Telecommunication System Designation (Cablevision Communications Company of Hertfordshire Limited) (East Hertfordshire) Order 1991 SI 1991/279
- Gloucestershire (District Boundaries) Order 1991 SI 1991/281
- Bedfordshire, Buckinghamshire and Cambridgeshire (County Boundaries) Order 1991 SI 1991/282
- Scottish Enterprise and Highlands and Islands Enterprise (Transfer of Property, Rights and Liabilities) Order 1991 SI 1991/283
- Hereford and Worcester and Shropshire (County Boundaries) Order 1991 SI 1991/284
- North Yorkshire, South Yorkshire and Nottinghamshire (County Boundaries) Order 1991 SI 1991/285
- Dorset and Somerset (County Boundaries) Order 1991 SI 1991/286
- Durham and North Yorkshire (County Boundaries) Order 1991 SI 1991/287
- Traffic Areas (Reorganisation) Order 1990 S.I. 1991/28 SI 1991/288
- Fresh Meat Export (Hygiene and Inspection) (Scotland) Amendment Regulations 1991 SI 1991/289
- Act of Sederunt (Fees of Sheriff Officers) 1991 SI 1991/290
- Act of Sederunt (Fees of Messengers-at-Arms) 1991 1991/29 SI 1991/291
- Public Telecommunication System Designation (Heartland Cablevision (UK) Limited) (Warwick & Stratford-on Avon) Order 1991 SI 1991/293
- Public Telecommunication System Designation (Heartland Cablevision II (UK) Limited) (Rugby) Order 1991 SI 1991/294
- Public Telecommunication System Designation (Jones Cable Group of Leeds Limited) Order 1991 SI 1991/295
- Public Telecommunication System Designation (Telecable of Calderdale Limited) Order 1991 SI 1991/296
- Public Telecommunication System Designation (Telecable of Macclesfield Limited) Order 1991 SI 1991/297
- Public Telecommunication System Designation (Telecable of Stockport Limited) Order 1991 SI 1991/298
- Drivers' Hours (Passenger and Goods Vehicles) (Exemption) (Revocation) Regulations 1991 SI 1991/299
- Community Drivers' Hours (Passenger and Goods Vehicles)(Temporary Exception) (Revocation) Regulations 1991 SI 1991/300

== 301–400 ==
- The Cheltenham, Cotswold and Gloucester (Parishes) Order 1991 S.I. 1991/301
- The Chorley (Parishes) Order 1991 S.I. 1991/302
- The Newbury (Parishes) Order 1991 S.I. 1991/303
- The Northampton (Parishes) Order 1991 S.I. 1991/304
- The Wansdyke (Parishes) Order 1991 S.I. 1991/305
- The West Wiltshire (Parishes) Order 1991 S.I. 1991/306
- Social Security (Invalid Care Allowance) Amendment Regulations 1991 SI 1991/307
- Offshore Installations (Well Control) (Amendment) Regulations 1991 SI 1991/308
- Derbyshire, Leicestershire, Lincolnshire, Nottinghamshire and Warwickshire (County Boundaries) Order 1991 SI 1991/309
- Buckinghamshire, Hertfordshire, Northamptonshire and Oxfordshire (County Boundaries) Order 1991 SI 1991/310
- Cheshire, Derbyshire, Hereford and Worcester and Staffordshire (County Boundaries) Order 1991 SI 1991/311
- Local Government Act 1988 (Defined Activities) (Exemption) (England) Order 1991 SI 1991/312
- Revenue Support Grant (Scotland) Order 1991 SI 1991/323
- Control of Pollution (Silage, Slurry and Agricultural Fuel Oil) Regulations 1991 SI 1991/324
- National Health Service (District Health Authorities) Order 1991 SI 1991/325
- National Health Service (Determination of Districts) Order 1991 SI 1991/326
- National Health Service Training Authority (Abolition) Order 1991 SI 1991/327
- National Health Service Training Authority and Disablement Services Authority Regulations 1991 SI 1991/328
- Regional and District Health Authorities (Membership and Procedure) Amendment Regulations 1991 SI 1991/329
- Law Reform (Miscellaneous Provisions) (Scotland) Act 1990 (Commencement No. 3) Order 1991 SI 1991/330
- High Court of Justiciary Fees Amendment Order SI 1991/331
- Court of Session etc. Fees Amendment Order 1991 SI 1991/332
- Sheriff Court Fees Amendment Order 1991 SI 1991/333
- Industrial Training (Plastics Processing Board) (Revocation) Order 1991 SI 1991/334
- Sea Fishing (Days in Port) (Amendment) Regulations 1991 SI 1991/335
- Removal, Storage and Disposal of Vehicles (Prescribed Sums and Charges etc.) (Amendment) Regulations 1991 SI 1991/336
- Highway Litter Clearance and Cleaning (Transfer of Duties) Order 1991 SI 1991/337
- Vehicles (Charges for Release from Immobilisation Devices) Regulations 1991 SI 1991/338
- Misuse of Drugs (Licence Fees) (Amendment) Regulations 1991 SI 1991/339
- Stock Transfer (Specified Securities) Order 1991 SI 1991/340
- Fire Services (Appointments and Promotion) (Scotland) Amendment Regulations 1991 SI 1991/343
- Local Government and Housing Act 1989 (Commencement No.11 and Savings) Order 1991 SI 1991/344
- Health Education Board for Scotland (Transfer of Officers) Regulations 1991 SI 1991/345
- Control of Pollution (Silage, Slurry and Agricultural Fuel Oil) (Scotland) Regulations 1991 SI 1991/346
- General Lighthouse Authorities (Beacons: Hyperbolic Systems) Order 1991 SI 1991/347
- Finance Act 1985 (Interest on Tax) (Prescribed Rate) Order 1991 SI 1991/348
- Local Authorities (Members' Allowances) Regulations 1991 SI 1991/351
- Personal Community Charge (Reductions) (England) (Amendment) Regulations 1991 SI 1991/352
- Education (Grant-maintained Schools) (Finance) Regulations 1991 SI 1991/353
- Attachment of Earnings (Employer's Deduction) Order 1991 SI 1991/356
- Building Societies (Designation of Qualifying Bodies) Order 1991. SI 1991/357
- National Health Service Trusts (Consultation before Establishment) (Scotland) Regulations 1991 SI 1991/358
- Islwyn (Pontllanfraith and Blackwood Communities) Order 1991 SI 1991/366
- Wildlife and Countryside Act 1981 (Variation of Schedule) Order 1991 SI 1991/367
- Eastbourne, Newcastle and Gateshead and North Surrey (Pipelaying and Other Works)(Codes of Practice) Order 1991 SI 1991/368
- Fire Services (Appointments and Promotion) (Amendment) Regulation 1991 SI 1991/369
- Imported Food (Peruvian Foodstuffs) Regulations 1991 SI 1991/370
- Value Added Tax (Refunds for Bad Depts) Regulations 1991 SI 1991/371
- Public Telecommunication System Designation (Britannia Cablesystems Wirral Limited) Order 1991 SI 1991/372
- Public Telecommunication System Designation (Newport Cablevision) Order 1991 SI 1991/373
- Public Telecommunication System Designation (Tayside Cable Systems Limited) (Dundee) Order 1991 SI 1991/374
- Oxfordshire (District Boundaries) Order 1991 SI 1991/379
- Insolvency (Amendment) Regulations 1991 SI 1991/380
- Passenger and Goods Vehicles (Recording Equipment) Regulations 1991 SI 1991/381
- Local Government (Non-Domestic District Rates and District Community Charges) (Scotland) Amendment Regulation 1991 SI 1991/382
- Education (Listed Bodies) Order 1991 SI 1991/383
- Education (Recognised Bodies) (Amendment) Order 1991 SI 1991/384
- Local Authority Stocks and Bonds (Scotland) Amendment Regulations 1991 SI 1991/385
- The Oxford (Parishes) Order 1991 S.I. 1991/386
- Enterprise (Scotland) Consequential Amendments Order 1991 SI 1991/387
- National Health Service and Community Care Act 1990 (Commencement No. 7) Order 1991 SI 1991/388
- Disablement Services Authority (Consequential Provisions) Order 1991 SI 1991/389
- Hill Livestock (Compensatory Allowances) (Amendment) Regulations 1991 SI 1991/392
- Sugar Beet (Research and Education) Order 1991 SI 1991/393
- Local Authorities Etc. (Allowance) (Scotland) Regulations 1991 SI 1991/397
- Central and Tayside Regions and Clackmannan and Perth and Kinross Districts (Crook of Devon and Rumbling Bridge) Boundaries Amendment Order 1991 SI 1991/398 (S. 40)

== 401–500 ==
- Diseases of Animals (Approved Disinfectants) (Amendment) Order 1991 SI 1991/404
- Poultry Flocks, Hatcheries and Processed Animal Protein (Fees) (Amendment) Order 1991 SI 1991/405
- National Health Service (Vocational Training) Amendment Regulations 1991 SI 1991/406
- United Kingdom Transplant Support Service Authority (Establishment and Constitution) Order 1991 SI 1991/407
- United Kingdom Transplant Support Service Authority Regulations 1991 SI 1991/408
- Education Reform Act 1988 (Commencement No. 9) Order 1991 SI 1991/409
- Education (Variation of Standard Numbers for Primary Schools) Order 1991 SI 1991/410
- Education (Publication of Proposals for Reduction in Standard Number) Regulations 1991 SI 1991/411
- Petty Sessional Divisions (Powys) Order 1991 SI 1991/412
- Sea Fish Industry Authority (Levy) (Amendment) Regulations 1990 Confirmatory Order 1991 SI 1991/417
- Public Telecommunication System Designation (Cheshire Cable Limited) Order 1991 SI 1991/422
- Public Airport Companies (Capital Finance) (Amendment) Order 1991 SI 1991/423
- International Carriage of Perishable Foodstuffs (Amendment) Regulations 1991 SI 1991/425
- Rent Officers (Additional Functions) (Amendment) Order 1991 SI 1991/426
- Guaranteed Minimum Pensions Increase Order 1991 SI 1991/427
- Statutory Sick Pay (Small Employers' Relief) Regulations 1991 SI 1991/428
- State Scheme Premiums (Actuarial Tables) Amendment Regulations 1991 SI 1991/429
- Community Charges and Non-Domestic Rating (Demand Notices) (Wales) (Amendment) (No.2) Regulations 1991 SI 1991/434
- Income Tax (Employments) (No. 20) Regulations 1991 SI 1991/435
- Wireless Telegraphy (Television Licence Fees) Regulations 1991 SI 1991/436
- National Assistance (Charges for Accommodation) Amendment Regulations 1991 SI 1991/437
- National Health Service (Charges to Overseas Visitors) Amendment Regulations 1991 SI 1991/438
- Local Government Reorganisation (Capital Money) (Greater London) Order 1991 SI 1991/439
- Housing Benefit and Community Charge Benefit (Subsidy) Regulations 1991 SI 1991/441
- Common Council and New Successor Bodies (Chief Finance Officer) Regulations 1991 SI 1991/445
- Isles of Scilly (Members' Allowances) Order 1991 SI 1991/446
- Cosmetic Products (Safety) (Amendment) Regulations 1991 SI 1991/447
- Public Telecommunications System Designation (East London Telecommunications Limited) (Havering) Order 1991 SI 1991/448
- Education (Special Educational Needs) (Approval of Independment Schools) Regulation 1991 SI 1991/449
- Education (Approval of Special Schools) (Amendment) Regulations 1991 SI 1991/450
- Goods Vehicles (Plating and Testing) (Amendment) (No. 2) Regulations 1991 SI 1991/454
- Motor Vehicles (Tests) (Amendment) (No. 2) Regulations 1991 SI 1991/455
- Public Service Vehicles (Conditions of Fitness, Equipment, Use and Certification) (Amendment) Regulations 1991 SI 1991/456
- Passenger and Goods Vehicles (Recording Equipment) (Approval of Fitters and Workshops) (Fees) (Amendment) Regulations 1991 SI 1991/457
- International Carriage of Dangerous Goods by Road (Fees) (Amendment) Regulations 1991 SI 1991/458
- International Transport of Goods under Cover of TIR Carnets (Fees) (Amendments) Regulations 1991 SI 1991/459
- Abortion (Scotland) Regulations 1991 SI 1991/460
- North West (Pipelaying and Other Works) (Code of Practice) Order 1991 SI 1991/461
- International Development Association (Ninth Replenishment) Order 1991 SI 1991/462
- Employment Protection (Variation of Limits) Order 1991 SI 1991/464
- Industrial Training Levy (Construction Board) Order 1991 SI 1991/465
- Unfair Dismissal (Increase of Compensation Limit) Order 1991 SI 1991/466
- Unfair Dismissal (Increase of Limits of Basic and Special Awards) Order 1991 SI 1991/467
- Civil Aviation (Navigation Services Charges) Regulations 1991 SI 1991/470
- Non-Domestic Rating (Caravan Sites) (Amendment) Regulations 1991 SI 1991/471
- Environmental Protection (Prescribed Processes and Substances) Regulations 1991 SI 1991/472
- Local Government (Promotion of Economic Development) (Amendment) Regulations 1991 SI 1991/473
- Standard Community Charge and Non-Domestic Rating (Definition of Domestic Property) (Amendment) Order 1991 SI 1991/474
- Non-Domestic Rating (Electricity Generators) Regulations 1991 SI 1991/475
- Litter (Relevant Land of Principal Litter Authorities and Relevant Crown Land) Order 1991 SI 1991/476
- Radioactive Substances (Smoke Detectors) Exemption (Amendment) Order 1991 SI 1991/477
- Wildlife and Countryside (Registration and Ringing of Certain Captive Birds) (Amendment) Regulations 1991 SI 1991/478
- Wildlife and Countryside (Registration to Sell etc. Certain Dead Wild Birds) (Amendment) Regulations 1991 SI 1991/479
- Human Fertilisation and Embryology Act 1990 (Commencement No. 2 and Transitional Provision) Order 1991 SI 1991/480
- National Health Service (Remuneration and Conditions of Service) Regulations 1991 SI 1991/481
- National Health Service Trusts (Public Meetings) Regulations 1991 SI 1991/482
- Public Telecommunication System Designation (Wakefield Cable Limited) Order 1991 SI 1991/483
- Certification Officer (Amendment of Fees) Regulations 1991 SI 1991/484
- Motor Vehicles (Driving Licenses) (Amendment) Regulations 1991 SI 1991/485
- Driving Licences (Community Driving Licence) (Amendment) Regulations 1991 SI 1991/486
- Merchant Shipping (Light Dues) (Amendment) Regulations 1991 SI 1991/487
- Companies Act 1989 (Commencement No. 9 and Saving and Transitional Provisions) Order 1991 SI 1991/488
- Financial Services Act 1986 (Restriction of Right of Action) Regulations 1991 SI 1991/489
- London Residuary Body (Transfer of Compensation Functions) Order 1991 SI 1991/490
- A1 London-Edinburgh-Thurso Trunk Road (North Shotton Slip Road) Order 1991 SI 1991/491
- Financial Services Act 1986 (Miscellaneous Exemptions) Order 1991 SI 1991/493
- Bankruptcy and Companies (Department of Trade and Industry) Fees (Amendment) Order 1991 SI 1991/494
- Insolvency (Amendment) Rules 1991 SI 1991/495
- Insolvency Fees (Amendment) Order 1991 SI 1991/496
- Education (London Residuary Body) (Property Transfer) Order 1991 SI 1991/497
- Food Protection (Emergency Prohibitions) (Lead in Cattle) (England) Order 1991 SI 1991/498
- Abortion Regulations 1991 SI 1991/499
- Local Authorities (Capital Finance) (Amendment) Regulations 1991 SI 1991/500

== 501–600 ==
- Local Authorities (Capital Finance) (Approved Investments) (Amendment) Regulations 1991 SI 1991/501
- Child Benefit and Social Security (Fixing and Adjustment of Rates) Amendment Regulations 1991 SI 1991/502
- Social Security Benefits Up-rating Order 1991 SI 1991/503
- Social Security (Contributions) Amendment Regulations 1991 SI 1991/504
- Social Security (Contributions) (Re-rating) Order 1991 SI 1991/505
- Statutory Sick Pay (Rate of Payment) Order 1991 SI 1991/506
- Environmental Protection (Applications, Appeals and Registers) Regulations 1991 (SI 1991/507)
- Disposal of Controlled Waste (Exceptions) Regulations 1991 (SI 1991/508)
- National Health Service Trusts (Pharmaceutical Services Remuneration—Special Arrangement) Order 1991 (SI 1991/509)
- National Bus Company (Dissolution) Order 1991 (SI 1991/510)
- Income Tax (Building Societies) (Annual Payments) Regulations 1991 SI 1991/512
- Environmental Protection (Authorisation of Processes) (Determination Periods) Order 1991 SI 1991/513
- Leicester-Great Yarmouth Trunk Road (A47) (Narborough Bypass) Detrunking Order 1991 SI 1991/514
- Motor Vehicles (Driving Licences) (Large Goods and Passenger-Carrying Vehicles) (Amendment) Regulations 1991 SI 1991/515
- Merseyside Traffic Control System (Revocation) Order 1991 SI 1991/516
- West Yorkshire Residuary Body (Winding Up) Order 1991 SI 1991/517
- Capital Allowances (Corresponding Northern Ireland Grants) Order 1991 SI 1991/518
- Friendly Societies (Fees) Regulations 1991 SI 1991/519
- Industrial and Provident Societies (Amendment of Fees) Regulations 1991 SI 1991/520
- Industrial and Provident Societies (Credit Unions) (Amendment of Fees) Regulations 1991 SI 1991/521
- Third Country Fishing (Enforcement) Order 1991 SI 1991/522
- Internal Drainage Boards (Finance) (Amendment) Regulations 1991 SI 1991/523
- Civil Legal Aid (General) (Amendment) Regulations 1991 SI 1991/524
- County Court (Amendment) Rules 1991 SI 1991/525
- County Court (Forms) (Amendment) Rules 1991 SI 1991/526
- Legal Advice and Assistance at Police Stations (Remuneration) (Amendment) Regulations 1991 SI 1991/527
- Legal Advice and Assistance (Duty Solicitor) (Remuneration) (Amendment) Regulations 1991 SI 1991/528
- Legal Aid in Criminal and Care Proceedings (Costs) (Amendment) Regulations 1991 SI 1991/529
- Matrimonial Causes (Costs) (Amendment) Rules 1991 SI 1991/530
- Rules of the Supreme Court (Amendment) 1991 SI 1991/531
- Value Added Tax (Annual Accounting) (Amendment) Regulations 1991 SI 1991/532
- Rent Officers (Additional Functions) (Scotland) Amendment Order 1991 SI 1991/533
- National Health Service (Optical Charges and Payments) (Miscellaneous Amendments) (Scotland) Regulations 1991 SI 1991/534
- National Health Service Trusts (Membership and Procedure) (Scotland) Regulations 1991 SI 1991/535
- Social Work (Provision of Social Work Services in the Scottish Health Service) (Scotland) Regulations 1991 SI 1991/536
- National Health Service (Remuneration and Conditions of Service) (Scotland) Regulations 1991 SI 1991/537
- Financial Services Act 1986 (Restriction of Right of Action) (Friendly Societies) Regulations 1991 SI 1991/538
- Industrial Assurance (Fees) Regulations 1991 SI 1991/539
- Sealink (Transfer of Lymington Pier) Harbour Revision Order 1991 SI 1991/540
- Wireless Telegraphy (Licence Charges) Regulations 1991 SI 1991/542
- Child Benefit (Different Rates) Order 1991 SI 1991/543
- Income Support (General) Amendment No. 2 Regulations 1991 SI 1991/544
- Social Security Benefits Up-rating Regulations 1991 SI 1991/545
- Social Security (Industrial Injuries) (Dependency) (Permitted Earnings Limits) Order 1991 SI 1991/546
- Social Security (Overlapping Benefits) Amendment Regulations 1991 SI 1991/547
- Lee Valley Regional Park Authority (Capital Finance) Regulations 1991 SI 1991/548
- Prevention of Terrorism (Temporary Provisions) Act 1989 (Continuance) Order 1991 SI 1991/549
- Education (Thames Valley College of Higher Education Corporation) (Dissolution) Order 1991 SI 1991/550
- Local Authorities (Borrowing) (Amendment) Regulations 1991 SI 1991/551
- Isles of Scilly (Community Care) Order 1991 SI 1991/552
- National Health Service (Appellate Functions) (Directions to Authorities) Regulations 1991 SI 1991/553
- National Health Service Functions (Directions to Authorities and Administration Arrangements) Regulations 1991 SI 1991/554
- National Health Service (General Medical and Pharmaceutical Services) (Miscellaneous Amendments) Regulations 1991 SI 1991/555
- National Health Service (Indicative Amounts) Regulations 1991 SI 1991/556
- National Health Service (Travelling Expenses and Remission of Charges) Amendment Regulations 1991 SI 1991/557
- Social Security Act 1990 (Commencement No. 3) Order 1991 SI 1991/558
- Education (Inner London Education Authority) (Tranisitional and Supplementary Provisions) Order 1991 SI 1991/559
- Litter (Designated Educational Institutions) Order 1991 SI 1991/561
- Large Combustion Plant (Control of Emissions) (Scotland) Regulations 1991 SI 1991/562
- Radioactive Substances (Smoke Detectors) Exemption (Scotland) Amendment Order 1991 SI 1991/563
- Common Services Agency (Membership and Procedure) Regulations 1991 SI 1991/564
- Civil Legal Aid (Scotland)(Fees) Amendment Regulations 1991 SI 1991/565
- Criminal Legal Aid (Scotland) (Fees) Amendment Regulations 1991 SI 1991/566
- Advice and Assistance (Scotland) Amendment Regulations 1991 SI 1991/567
- Legal Aid (Scotland) (Fees in Civil Proceedings) Amendment Regulations 1991 SI 1991/568
- National Health Service (Dental Services) (Miscellaneous Amendments) (Scotland) Regulations 1991 SI 1991/569
- Functions of Health Boards (Scotland) Order 1991 SI 1991/570
- National Health Service (General Medical and Pharmaceutical Services) (Scotland) Amendment Regulations 1991 SI 1991/572
- National Health Service (Fund-Holding Practices) (General) (Scotland) Regulations 1991 SI 1991/573
- National Health Service (Charges for Drugs and Appliances) (Scotland) Amendment Regulations 1991 SI 1991/574
- National Health Service (Travelling Expenses and Remission of Charges) (Scotland) Amendment Regulations 1991 SI 1991/575
- National Health Service (Vocational Training) (Scotland) Amendment Regulations 1991 SI 1991/576
- Channel Tunnel (Emergency Medical Services) Order 1991 SI 1991/577
- Clinical Standards Advisory Group Regulations 1991 SI 1991/578
- National Health Service (Charges for Drugs and Appliances) Amendment Regulations 1991 SI 1991/579
- National Health Service (Dentists' Remuneration-Special Arrangement) Order 1991 SI 1991/580
- National Health Service (Dental Services) (Miscellaneous Amendments) Regulations 1991 SI 1991/581
- National Health Service (Fund-holding Practices) (General) Regulations 1991 SI 1991/582
- National Health Service (Optical Charges and Payments) (Miscellaneous Amendments) Regulations 1991 SI 1991/583
- National Health Service Superannuation, Premature Retirement and Injury Benefits (Amendment) Regulations 1991 SI 1991/584
- Welfare Food Amendment Regulations 1991 SI 1991/585
- Petty Sessional Divisions (Wiltshire) Order 1991 SI 1991/586
- Housing Benefit and Community Charge Benefit (Subsidy) Order 1991 SI 1991/587
- Personal and Occupational Pension Schemes (Pensions Ombudsman) Regulations 1991 SI 1991/588
- Statutory Sick Pay (National Health Service Employees) Regulations 1991 SI 1991/589
- Statutory Maternity Pay (National Health Service Employees) Regulations 1991 SI 1991/590

== 601–700 ==
- Grants to Voluntary Organisations (Greater London) (Expenditure Limit) Order 1991 SI 1991/606
- National Health Service and Community Care Act 1990 (Commencement No. 8 and Transitional Provisions) (Scotland) Order 1991 SI 1991/607
- Courts and Legal Services Act 1990 (Commencement No. 3) Order 1991 SI 1991/608
- Parliamentary Pensions (Amendment) Regulations 1991 SI 1991/609
- Public Telecommunication System Designation (Wessex Cable Limited) (Salisbury) Order 1991 SI 1991/610
- Income Tax (Interest Relief) (Qualifying Lenders) Order 1991 SI 1991/618
- Housing (Right to Buy) (Priority of Charges) Order 1991 SI 1991/619
- Insurance (Fees) Regulations 1991 SI 1991/621
- A39 Trunk Road (Wadebridge Bypass) Order 1991 SI 1991/628
- Control of Gold, Securities, Payments and Credits (Kuwait) (Revocation) Directions 1991 SI 1991/629
- A39 Trunk Road (Wadebridge Bypass) (Detrunking) Order 1991 SI 1991/630
- Disease of Animals (Approved Disinfectants) (Amendment) (No. 2) Order 1991 SI 1991/631
- Medicines (Fees Relating to Medicinal Products for Animal Use) Regulations 1991 SI 1991/632
- Medicines (Exemptions from Licences and Animal Test Certificates) (Amendment) Order 1991 SI 1991/633
- Traffic Areas (Reorganisation) Order 1991 SI 1991/634
- Civil Legal Aid (Assessment of Resources) (Amendment) Regulations 1991 SI 1991/635
- Legal Advice and Assistance (Amendment) Regulations 1991 SI 1991/636
- Legal Aid in Criminal and Care Proceedings (General) (Amendment) Regulations 1991 SI 1991/637
- Merchant Shipping (Distress Signals and Prevention of Collisions) (Amendment) Regulations 1991 SI 1991/638
- Social Security (Contributions) Amendment (No. 2) Regulations 1991 SI 1991/639
- Social Security (Contributions) Amendment (No. 3) Regulations 1991 SI 1991/640
- Statutory Maternity Pay (Compensation of Employers) Amendment Regulations 1991 SI 1991/641
- The Wealden (Parishes) Order 1991 S.I. 1991/644
- Non-Domestic Rates (Levying) (Scotland) Regulations 1991 SI 1991/645
- Electricity Generators (Rateable Values) (Scotland) Order 1991 SI 1991/646
- Scottish Hydro-Electric plc (Rateable Values) (Scotland) Order 1991 SI 1991/647
- Scottish Nuclear Limited (Rateable Values) (Scotland) Order 1991 SI 1991/648
- Scottish Power plc (Rateable Values) (Scotland) Order 1991 SI 1991/649
- Offshore Installations (Safety Zones) (No. 2)Order 1991 SI 1991/650
- Plant Breeders' Rights (Fees) (Amendment) Regulations 1991 SI 1991/655
- Seeds (Fees) (Amendment) Regulations 1991 SI 1991/656
- Seeds (National Lists of Varieties) (Fees) (Amendment) Regulations 1991 SI 1991/657
- Lands Tribunal for Scotland (Amendment) (Fees) Rules 1991 SI 1991/658
- Scottish Land Court (Fees) Order 1991 SI 1991/659
- Buckinghamshire County Council Campbell Park to Newlands (Canal Bridge) Scheme 1990 Confirmation Instrument 1991 SI 1991/661
- Patent Office (Address) Rules 1991 SI 1991/675
- Public Telecommunication System Designation (Middlesex Cable Limited) (Hillingdon and Hounslow) Order 1991 SI 1991/676
- Education (National Curriculum) (Attainment Targets and Programmes of Study in Geography) (England) Order 1991 SI 1991/678
- Offshore Installations (Amendment) Regulations 1991 SI 1991/679
- Submarine Pipe-lines (Inspectors and Safety) (Amendment) Regulations 1991 SI 1991/680
- Education (National Curriculum) (Attainment Targets and Programmes of Study in History) (England) Order 1991 SI 1991/681
- Financial Assistance for Environmental Purposes Order 1991 SI 1991/682
- Pensions Increase (Review) Order 1991 SI 1991/684
- Environmental Protection Act 1990 (Commencement No. 6 and Appointed Day) Order 1991 SI 1991/685
- National Assistance (Charges for Accommodation) (Scotland) Regulations 1991 SI 1991/686
- Public Telecommunication System Designation (Jones Cable Group of Aylesbury and Chiltern Limited) Order 1991 SI 1991/687
- Public Telecommunication System Designation (Tayside Cable Systems Ltd) (Perth) Order 1991 SI 1991/688
- Value Added Tax (General) (Amendment) Regulations 1991 SI 1991/691
- Statutory Sick Pay Act 1991 (Consequential) Regulations 1991 SI 1991/694
- District of Welwyn Hatfield (Electoral Arrangements) Order 1991 SI 1991/695
- (A696) Ponteland Road Roundabout (Trunking) Order 1991 SI 1991/696
- (A6125) North Brunton Roundabout (Trunking) Order 1991 SI 1991/697

== 701–800 ==
- Building Societies (Deferred Shares) Order 1991 SI 1991/701
- Building Societies (Designated Capital Resources) (Permanent Interest Bearing Shares) Order 1991 SI 1991/702
- Food Protection (Emergency Prohibitions) (Lead in Cattle) (England) (Revocation) (No. 2) Order 1991 SI 1991/703
- Social Security (Mobility Allowance and Adjudication) Amendment Regulations 1991 SI 1991/706
- Contracts (Applicable Law) Act 1990 (Commencement No. 1) Order 1991 SI 1991/707
- Personal Injuries (Civilians) Amendment Scheme 1991 SI 1991/708
- Public Telecommunication System Designation (Britannia Cablesystems Teesside Limited) Order 1991 SI 1991/709
- West Midlands Residuary Body (Winding Up) Order 1991 SI 1991/710
- A6119 and A677 Leeds-Halifax-Burnley-Blackburn-East of Preston Trunk Road (Whitebirk to Samlesbury) (Detrunking) Order 1991 SI 1991/716
- Caribbean Development Bank (Further Payments) Order 1991 SI 1991/717
- Workmen's Compensation (Supplementation) Amendment Scheme 1991 SI 1991/718
- Litter Etc. (Transitional Provisions) Regulations 1991 SI 1991/719
- Borough of Langbaurgh (Electoral Arrangements) Order 1991 SI 1991/720
- M65 Motorway (Bamber Bridge to Whitebirk Section, Blackburn Southern Bypass) and Connecting Roads Scheme 1991 SI 1991/722
- Non-Domestic Rating (Alteration of Central Lists) (Amendment) Regulations 1991 SI 1991/723
- High Court and County Courts Jurisdiction Order 1991 SI 1991/724
- National Health Service Contracts (Dispute Resolution) Regulations 1991 SI 1991/725
- Income Tax (Indexation) Order 1991 SI 1991/732
- Personal Equity Plan (Amendment) Regulations 1991 SI 1991/733
- Retirement Benefits Schemes (Indexation of Earnings Cap) Order 1991 SI 1991/734
- Inheritance Tax (Indexation) Order 1991 SI 1991/735
- Capital Gains Tax (Annual Exempt Amount) Order 1991 SI 1991/736
- Value Added Tax (Charities) Order 1991 SI 1991/737
- Value Added Tax (Increase of Registration Limits) Order 1991 SI 1991/738
- Personal Community Charge (Hospital Patients) Order 1991 SI 1991/739
- Civil Legal Aid (Scotland) Amendment Regulations 1991 SI 1991/745
- Advice and Assistance (Scotland) (Prospective Cost) Amendment Regulations 1991 SI 1991/746
- Merger Situation (Stora/Swedish Match/Gillette) (Interim Provision) Order 1991 SI 1991/750
- Education (National Curriculum) (Attainment Targets and Programmes of Study in Geography) (Wales) Order 1991 SI 1991/751
- Education (National Curriculum) (Attainment Targets and Programmes of Study in History) (Wales) Order 1991 SI 1991/752
- A16 Trunk Road (Spalding to Sutterton Improvement) Order 1991 SI 1991/753
- A16 Trunk Road (Spalding to Sutterton Improvement) (Detrunking) Order 1991 SI 1991/754
- European Communities (Designation) (No. 2) Order 1991 SI 1991/755
- Antarctic Treaty (Specially Protected Areas) Order 1991 SI 1991/756
- European Bank for Reconstruction and Development (Immunities and Privileges) Order 1991 SI 1991/757
- European Communities (Definition of Treaties) (Fourth ACP-EEC Convention of Lome) Order 1991 SI 1991/758
- Appropriation (Northern Ireland) Order 1991 SI 1991/759
- Census (Confidentiality) (Northern Ireland) Order 1991 (SI 1991/760)
- Financial Provisions(Northern Ireland) Order 1991 SI 1991/761
- Food Safety(Northern Ireland) Order 1991 SI 1991/762
- Merchant Shipping (Distress Signals and Prevention of Collisions) (Guernsey) (Amendment) Order 1991 SI 1991/763
- Repayment of Fees and Charges(Northern Ireland) Order 1991 SI 1991/764
- Statutory Sick Pay (Northern Ireland) Order 1991 SI 1991/765
- Naval, Military and Air Forces etc. (Disablement and Death) Service Pensions Amendment Order 1991 SI 1991/766
- Social Security (Norway) Order 1991 SI 1991/767
- Collision Regulations (Seaplanes) (Amendment) Order 1991 SI 1991/768
- Collision Regulations (Seapanes) (Guernsey) (Amendment) Order 1991 SI 1991/769
- Merchant Shipping (Categorisation of Registries of Overseas Territories) Order 1991 SI 1991/770
- Motor Vehicles (International Circulation) (Amendment) Order 1991 SI 1991/771
- Lords Office-holders Allowance Order 1991 SI 1991/772
- Vehicle Inspectorate Trading Fund Order 1991 SI 1991/773
- Agricultural, Fishery and Aquaculture Products (Improvement Grant) Regulations 1991 SI 1991/777
- Public Telecommunication System Designation (Diamond Cable (Mansfield) Limited) Order 1991 SI 1991/778
- Northern Ireland (Emergency and Prevention of Terrorism Provisions) (Continuance) Order 1991 SI 1991/779
- Highlands and Islands Rural Enterprise Programme Regulations 1991 SI 1991/780
- Merchant Shipping (Fees) Regulations 1991 SI 1991/784
- Supply of Razors and Razor Blades (Interim Provision) Order 1991 SI 1991/785
- Pensions Increase (Judicial Pensions)(Amendment) Regulations 1991 SI 1991/786
- Pensions Increase (Past Prime Ministers) Regulations 1991 SI 1991/787
- Pensions Increase (Speakers' Pensions) (Amendment) Regulations 1991 SI 1991/788
- Costs in Criminal Cases (General) (Amendment) Regulations 1991 SI 1991/789
- Legal Aid Act 1988 (Commencement No. 4) Order 1991 SI 1991/790
- Combined Probation Areas (Powys) Order 1991 SI 1991/791
- Gloucestershire Districts (Electoral Arrangements) Order 1991 SI 1991/793
- Combined Probation Areas (Wiltshire) Order 1991 SI 1991/794
- Census (Amendment) Regulations 1991 SI 1991/796
- A17 Trunk Road (Leadenham Bypass) Order 1991 SI 1991/797
- A17 Trunk Road (Leadenham Bypass) (Detrunking) Order 1991 SI 1991/798
- King's Lynn-Newark Trunk Road (Leadenham By-Pass and Slip Roads) (Revocation) Order 1991 SI 1991/799

== 801–900 ==
- Merseyside Traffic Control System (Revocation) (No. 2) Order SI 1991/808
- Health Boards (Membership and Procedure) (No.2) Regulations 1991 SI 1991/809
- Appellants (Increase in Expenses) (Scotland) Order 1991 SI 1991/810
- Department of Transport (Fees) (Amendment) Order 1991 SI 1991/811
- District of South Herefordshire (Electoral Arrangements) Order 1991 SI 1991/816
- Consumer Credit (Period of Standard Licence) (Amendment) Regulations 1991 SI 1991/817
- Redundancy Payments (Local Government) (Modification) (Amendment) Order 1991 SI 1991/818
- Home Purchase Assistance (Price-limits) Order 1991 SI 1991/819
- Motor Vehicles (Type Approval) (Amendment) Regulations 1991 SI 1991/820
- Act of Sederunt (Amendment of Summary Cause and Small Claim Rules) 1991 SI 1991/821
- Law Reform (Miscellaneous Provisions) (Scotland) Act 1990 (Commencement No.4) Order 1991 SI 1991/822
- Companies Act 1985 (Mutual Recognition of Prospectuses) Regulations 1991 SI 1991/823
- European Communities (Recognition of Professional Qualifications) Regulations 1991 SI 1991/824
- Imprisonment and Detention (Air Force) (Amendment) Rules 1991 SI 1991/825
- Imprisonment and Detention (Army) (Amendment) Rules 1991 SI 1991/826
- Education (Mandatory Awards) (Amendment) Regulations 1991 SI 1991/827
- Children Act 1989 (Commencement and Transitional Provisions) Order 1991 SI 1991/828
- Education (Student Loans) (Amendment) Regulations 1991 SI 1991/829
- Education (Fees and Awards) (Amendment) Regulations 1991 SI 1991/830
- State Awards (Amendment) Regulations 1991 SI 1991/831
- Dairy Produce Quotas (Amendment) Regulations 1991 SI 1991/832
- Education (Fees and Awards, Allowances and Bursaries) (Scotland) Amendment Regulations 1991 SI 1991/834
- Personal Community Charge (Relief) (Wales) (Amendment) Regulations 1991 SI 1991/835
- Environmental Protection (Amendment of Regulations) Regulations 1991 SI 1991/836
- Legal Aid in Contempt Proceedings (Remuneration) Regulations 1991 SI 1991/837
- Legal Aid in Criminal and Care Proceedings (Costs) (Amendment) (No.2) Regulations 1991 SI 1991/838
- Blood Tests (Evidence of Paternity) (Amendment) (No. 2) Regulations 1991 SI 1991/839
- Community Charges (Miscellaneous Provisions) Regulations 1991 SI 1991/841
- Community Charges and Non-Domestic Rating (Demand Notices) (England) (Amendment) Regulations 1991 SI 1991/842
- Community Charges and Non-Domestic Rating (Demand Notices) (City of London) (Amendment) Regulations 1991 SI 1991/843
- Personal Community Charge (Reductions) (England) (Amendment) (No. 2) Regulations 1991 SI 1991/844
- Act of Sederunt (Rules of the Court of Session Amendment No.3) (Solicitors' Fees) 1991 SI 1991/846
- Act of Adjournal (Consolidation Amendment No.1) 1991 SI 1991/847
- Act of Sederunt (Fees of Solicitors in the Sheriff Court) (Amendment) 1991 SI 1991/848
- Community Charge Benefits (General) Amendment (No. 2) Regulations 1991 SI 1991/849
- Law Reform (Miscellaneous Provisions) (Scotland) Act 1990 (Commencement No. 5) Order 1991 SI 1991/850
- Lloyd's Underwriters (Tax) (1988–89) Regulations 1991 SI 1991/851
- Electricity Act 1989 (Scottish Power plc) Extinguishment of Loans Order 1991 SI 1991/852
- Electricity Act 1989 (Scottish Hydro-Electric plc) Extinguishment of Loans Order 1991 SI 1991/853
- Personal Community Charge (Reduction for 1990–91) (Scotland) Regulations 1991 SI 1991/854
- Personal Community Charge (Reduction for 1991–92) (Scotland) Regulations 1991 SI 1991/855
- Community Charges (Levying, Collection and Payment) (Scotland) Regulations 1991 SI 1991/856
- Central Office of Information Trading Fund Order 1991 SI 1991/857
- Public Lending Right (Increase of Limit) Order 1991 SI 1991/858
- Estate Agents (Provision of Information) Regulations 1991 SI 1991/859
- Estate Agents (Specified Offences) Order 1991 SI 1991/860
- Estate Agents (Undesirable Practices) Order 1991 SI 1991/861
- Superannuation (Children's Pensions) (Earnings Limit) Order 1991 SI 1991/862
- Gaming Act (Variation of Monetary Limits) Order 1991 SI 1991/870
- Gaming Clubs (Hours and Charges) (Amendment) Regulations 1991 SI 1991/871
- Gaming Clubs (Multiple Bingo) (Amendment) Regulations 1991 SI 1991/872
- Measuring Instruments (EEC Requirements) (Fees) (Amendment) Regulations 1991 SI 1991/873
- Wireless Telegraphy Apparatus (Approval) (Test Fees) Order 1991 SI 1991/874
- Buying Agency Trading Fund Order 1991 SI 1991/875
- Property Services Agency Supplies Trading Fund Order 1976 (Revocation) Order 1991 SI 1991/876
- Community Charges (Demand Notices) (Additional Provisions) (Wales) Regulations 1991 SI 1991/877
- Companies Act 1989 (Commencement No. 10 and Saving Provisions) Order 1991 SI 1991/878
- Companies (Forms) Regulations 1991 SI 1991/879
- Financial Markets and Insolvency Regulations 1991 SI 1991/880
- Broadcasting (Channel 3 Transmission and Shared Distribution Costs) Order 1991 SI 1991/881
- Taxes (Interest Rate) (Amendment) Regulations 1991 SI 1991/889
- Arrangements for Placement of Children (General) Regulations 1991 SI 1991/890
- Contact with Children Regulations 1991 SI 1991/891
- Definition of Independent Visitors (Children) Regulations 1991 SI 1991/892
- Placement of Children with Parents etc. Regulations 1991 SI 1991/893
- Representations Procedure (Children) Regulations 1991 SI 1991/894
- Review of Children's Cases Regulations 1991 SI 1991/895
- Housing Renovation etc. Grants (Reduction of Grant) (Amendment) Regulations 1991 SI 1991/897
- Housing Renovation etc. Grants (Prescribed Forms and Particulars) (Amendment) Regulations 1991 SI 1991/898
- Pneumoconiosis etc. (Workers' Compensation) (Payment of Claims) (Amendment) Regulations 1991 SI 1991/899
- Common Services Agency (Withdrawal and Amendment of Functions) (Scotland) Order 1991 SI 1991/900

== 901–1000 ==
- Foster Placement (Children) Regulations 1991 SI 1991/910
- Injuries in War (Shore Employments) Compensation (Amendment) Scheme 1991 SI 1991/911
- Scottish Nuclear Limited (Rateable Values) (Scotland) (No.2) Order 1991 SI 1991/914
- Caravan Sites and Pitches (Rateable Values) (Scotland) Order 1991 SI 1991/915
- Mines and Quarries (Rateable Values) (Scotland) Order 1991 SI 1991/916
- Industrial and Freight Transport (Rateable Values) (Scotland) Order 1991 SI 1991/917
- A18 Trunk Road (Barnetby Top to East of Ermine Street) (Detrunking) Order 1991 SI 1991/924
- North Tyneside Steam Railway Light Railway Order 1991 (SI 1991/933)
- Vaccine Damage Payments Act 1979 Statutory Sum Order 1991 SI 1991/939
- British Gas plc. (Rateable Values) (Scotland) Order 1991 SI 1991/940
- British Telecommunications plc. (Rateable Values) (Scotland) Order 1991 SI 1991/941
- Water Undertakings (Rateable Values) (Scotland) Order 1991 SI 1991/942
- Electricity Generators (Rateable Values) (Scotland) (No. 2) Order 1991 SI 1991/943
- Glasgow Underground (Rateable Values) (Scotland) Order 1991 SI 1991/944
- British Alcan Primary and Recycling Ltd. (Rateable Values) (Scotland) Order 1991 SI 1991/945
- Mercury Communications Ltd. (Rateable Values) (Scotland) Order 1991 SI 1991/946
- Scottish Power plc (Rateable Values) (Scotland) (No.2) Order 1991 SI 1991/947
- British Railways Board (Rateable Values) (Scotland) Order 1991 SI 1991/948
- Lochaber Power Company (Rateable Values) (Scotland) Order 1991 SI 1991/949
- Scottish Hydro-Electric plc (Rateable Values) (Scotland) (No. 2) Order 1991 SI 1991/950
- Representation of the People (Variation of Limits of Candidates' Election Expenses) Order 1991 SI 1991/951
- Adopted Persons (Contact Register) (Fees) Rules 1991 SI 1991/952
- Local Government and Housing Act 1989 (Commencement No. 12) Order 1991 SI 1991/953
- Housing Act 1988 (Commencement No. 5 and Transitional Provisions) Order 1991 SI 1991/954
- Public Telecommunication System Designation (Britannia Cablesystems Surrey Limited) Order 1991 SI 1991/955
- Electricity Industry (Rateable Values) (Amendment) Order 1991 SI 1991/959
- New Street Byelaws (Extension of Operation) (Amendment) Order 1991 SI 1991/960
- Litter (Animal Droppings) Order 1991 SI 1991/961
- Medicines (Products Other Than Veterinary Drugs) (Prescription Only) Amendment Order 1991 SI 1991/962
- Education (London Residuary Body) (Property Transfer) (No. 2) Order 1991 SI 1991/964
- Immigration (Registration with Police) (Amendment) Regulations 1991 SI 1991/965
- Employment Protection Code of Practice (Time Off) Order 1991 SI 1991/968
- International Carriage of Perishable Foodstuffs (Amendment) (No. 2) Regulations 1991 SI 1991/969
- City of Bradford Metropolitan Council (Salts Mill to Otley Road Link Road, Canal Bridge) Scheme 1990 Confirmation Instrument 1991 SI 1991/970
- Revenue Support Grant (Scotland) (No.2) Order 1991 SI 1991/971
- Fertilisers (Sampling and Analysis) Regulations 1991 SI 1991/973
- Housing (Prescribed forms) (No. 2) (Welsh Forms) Regulations 1991 SI 1991/974
- Inspection of Premises, Children and Records (Independent Schools) Regulations 1991 SI 1991/975
- Community Charges (Notices) (Substitute Charges) (England) Regulations 1991 SI 1991/979
- Immigration (Variation of Leave) (Revocation) Order 1991 SI 1991/980
- Petroleum (Production) (Landward Areas) Regulations 1991 SI 1991/981
- Houses in Multiple Occupation (Charges for Registration Schemes) Regulations 1991 SI 1991/982
- Local Government Finance (Consequential Amendment) Order 1991 SI 1991/983
- Slaughterhouses (Hygiene) and Meat Inspection (Amendment) Regulations 1991 SI 1991/984
- Courts and Legal Services Act 1990 (Commencement No. 4) Order 1991 SI 1991/985
- Gaming Act (Variation of Monetary Limits) (Scotland) Order 1991 SI 1991/986
- Gaming Clubs (Hours and Charges) (Scotland) Amendment Regulations 1991 SI 1991/987
- Caribbean Territories (Abolition of Death Penalty for Murder) Order 1991 (SI 1991/988)
- Employment Code of Practice (Trade Union Ballots on Industrial Action) Order 1991 SI 1991/989
- House of Commons Member's Fund Resolution 1991 (SI 1991/992)
- Portsmouth Mile End Quay Harbour Revision Order 1991 SI 1991/993
- Naval Medical Compassionate Fund (Amendment) Order 1991 SI 1991/994
- Child Abduction and Custody (Parties to Conventions) Order 1991 SI 1991/995
- Consular Fees (Amendment) Order 1991 SI 1991/996
- Spain (Extradition) (Dependent Territories) Order 1991 SI 1991/997
- Broadcasting Act 1990 (Isle of Man) (No. 2) Order 1991 SI 1991/998
- Trustee Investments (Additional Powers) Order 1991 SI 1991/999

== 1001–1100 ==
- Immigration Act 1988 (Commencement No. 2) Order 1991 SI 1991/1001
- County Council of Humberside (Old River Ancholme Bridge) Scheme 1990 Confirmation Instrument 1991 SI 1991/1002
- City of Westminster (Ladbroke Grove Canal Bridge Widening and Harrow Road Junction Improvement) Scheme 1988 Confirmation Instrument 1991 SI 1991/1020
- Motor Vehicles (Type Approval for Goods Vehicles) (Great Britain) (Amendment) Regulations 1991 SI 1991/1021
- Motor Vehicles (Type Approval) (Great Britain) (Amendment) Regulations 1991 SI 1991/1022
- Special Hospitals Service Authority (Functions and Membership) Amendment Regulations 1991 SI 1991/1025
- Pilotage Act 1987 (Abolition of Pilotage Commission: Appointed Day) Order 1991 SI 1991/1028
- Pilotage Act 1987 (Commencement No. 4) Order 1991 SI 1991/1029
- Swine Fever (Amendment) Order 1991 SI 1991/1030
- Savings Certificates Regulations 1991 SI 1991/1031
- Estate Agents (Undesirable Practices) (No. 2) Order 1991 SI 1991/1032
- Income Support (General) Amendment (No. 3) Regulations 1991 SI 1991/1033
- Education (Particulars of Independent Schools) (Amendment) Regulations 1991 SI 1991/1034
- North Yorkshire County Council (Rampart Bridge) Scheme 1986 Confirmation Instrument 1991 SI 1991/1035
- Environmental Protection Act 1990 (Commencement No. 7) Order 1991 SI 1991/1042
- Litter (Statutory Undertakers) (Designation and Relevant Land) Order 1991 SI 1991/1043
- Public Telecommunication System Designation (Alphavision Communications Grim-Clee Limited) (Grimsby and Cleethorpes) Order 1991 SI 1991/1044
- Public Telecommunication System Designation (Telecommunications Network Limited) (Bromley) Order 1991 SI 1991/1045
- Personal Community Charge (Reductions) (England) (Amendment) (No. 3) Regulations 1991 SI 1991/1061
- Manchester Ship Canal Harbour Revision Order 1990 SI 1991/1063
- Public Telecommunication System Designation (Alphavision Communications Lincoln Limited) Order 1991 SI 1991/1069
- Public Telecommunication System Designation (Greater Manchester Cablevision Limited) Order 1991 SI 1991/1070
- Football Spectators Act 1989 (Commencement No. 3) Order 1991 SI 1991/1071
- Criminal Justice (International Co-operation) Act 1990 (Commencement No. 1) Order 1991 SI 1991/1072
- Magistrates' Courts (Criminal Justice (International Co-operation)) Rules 1991 SI 1991/1074
- London-Brighton Trunk Road (A23 Hickstead) Order 1987, Amendment Order 1991 SI 1991/1075
- London–Brighton Trunk Road (A23 Hickstead Slip Roads) Order 1987, Amendment Order 1991 SI 1991/1076
- London-Brighton Trunk Road (A23 Hickstead Slip Roads) (No. 3) Order 1991 SI 1991/1077
- Finance Act 1985 (Interest on Tax) (Prescribed Rate) (No.2) Order 1991 SI 1991/1078
- State Awards (State Bursaries for Adult Education) (Wales) (Amendment) Regulations 1991 SI 1991/1079
- Income Tax (Employments) (No. 21) Regulations 1991 SI 1991/1080
- Income Tax (Sub-contractors in the Construction Industry) (Amendment) Regulations 1991 SI 1991/1081
- Caledionian MacBrayne Limited (Gott Bay Pier) Harbour Revision Order 1990 SI 1991/1082
- Immigration (Variation of Leave) (No.2) Order 1991 SI 1991/1083
- Estate Agents (Specified Offences) (No. 2) Order 1991 SI 1991/1091
- Civil Legal Aid (Financial Conditions) (Scotland) Regulations 1991 SI 1991/1094
- Advice and Assistance (Financial Conditions) (Scotland) Regulations 1991 SI 1991/1095
- Advice and Assistance (Scotland) (Prospective Cost) Regulations 1991 SI 1991/1096
- Firemen's Pension Scheme (Amendment) Order 1991 SI 1991/1097

== 1101–1200 ==
- Health Promotion Authority for Wales Constitution Order 1991 SI 1991/1102
- Health Promotion Authority for Wales Regulations 1991 SI 1991/1103
- Financial Services Act 1986 (Extension of Scope of Act) Order 1991 SI 1991/1104
- Montrose (Pilotage) Harbour Revision Order 1990 SI 1991/1106
- County Council of Humberside (Newland Bridge) Scheme 1990 Confirmation Instrument 1991 SI 1991/1107
- Social Security Revaluation of Earnings Factors Order 1991 SI 1991/1108
- Protection of Wrecks (Designation No. 1) Order 1991 SI 1991/1110
- Yorkshire Dales Light Railway Order 1991 (SI 1991/1111)
- Children (Admissibility of Hearsay Evidence) Order 1991 SI 1991/1115
- Copyright (Recording for Archives of Designated Class of Broadcasts and Cable Programmes) (Designated Bodies) Order 1991 SI 1991/1116
- Taxes (Interest Rate) (Amendment) (No. 2) Regulations 1991 SI 1991/1120
- Motor Vehicles (Driving Licences) (Amendment) (No. 2) Regulations 1991 SI 1991/1121
- Motor Vehicles (Driving Licences) (Large Goods and Passenger-Carrying Vehicles) (Amendment) (No. 2) Regulations 1991 SI 1991/1122
- Central Council for Education and Training in Social Work (Functions) Regulations 1991 SI 1991/1123
- Gipsy Encampments (District of Tandridge) Order 1991 SI 1991/1125
- County Court (Amendment No. 2) Rules 1991 SI 1991/1126
- Community Charges and Non-Domestic Rating (Miscellaneous Provisions) Regulations 1991 SI 1991/1127
- Motor Cars (Driving Instruction) (Amendment) Regulations 1991 SI 1991/1129
- County Court (Forms) (Amendment No.2) Rules 1991 SI 1991/1132
- A5 Trunk Road (Kilsby Diversion) Order 1991 SI 1991/1133
- Education (Teachers) (Amendment) Regulations 1991 SI 1991/1134
- Act of Sederunt (Shorthand Writers' Fees) 1991 SI 1991/1135
- Teachers (Entitlement to Registration) (Scotland) Regulations 1991 SI 1991/1136
- A11 Trunk Road (Newmarket to Red Lodge Dualling) Detrunking Order 1991 SI 1991/1137
- A11 Trunk Road (Newmarket to Red Lodge Dualling) Slip Roads Order 1991 SI 1991/1138
- Local Loans (Procedure) (Amendment) Regulations 1991 SI 1991/1139
- Public Works Loans (Fees) (Amendment) Regulations 1991 SI 1991/1140
- Charities (John Lyon Road Trust) Order 1991 SI 1991/1141
- Data Protection Registration Fee Order 1991 SI 1991/1142
- Public Telecommunication System Designation (Diamond Cable (Newark) Limited) Order 1991 SI 1991/1143
- European Bank for Reconstruction and Development (Subscription to Capital Stock) Order 1991 SI 1991/1144
- Stock Transfer (Gilt-Edged Securities) (Exempt Transfer) Regulations 1991 SI 1991/1145
- A585 Trunk Road (Fleetwood Diversion) Order 1991 SI 1991/1146
- A585 Trunk Road (Fleetwood Diversion) (Detrunking) Order 1991 SI 1991/1147
- Specified Diseases (Notification) Order 1991 SI 1991/1155
- Control of Pollution (Continuation of Byelaws) (Scotland) Order 1991 SI 1991/1156
- Act of Sederunt (Rules of the Court of Session Amendment No.2) (Miscellaneous) 1991 SI 1991/1157
- Act of Sederunt (Rules of the Court of Session Amendment No.4) (Shorthand Writers' Fees) 1991 SI 1991/1158
- Data Protection (Fees) Regulations 1991 SI 1991/1160
- Tanfield Railway (Causey Extension) Light Railway Order 1991 (SI 1991/1162)
- Cod (Specified Sea Areas) (Prohibition of Fishing) Order 1991 SI 1991/1163
- Industrial Training Levy (Engineering Board) Order 1991 SI 1991/1164
- Social Security (Earnings Factor) Amendment Regulations 1991 SI 1991/1165
- Superannuation (Scottish Legal Services Ombudsman) Order 1991 SI 1991/1166
- Diseases of Animals (Fees for the Testing of Disinfectants) Order 1991 SI 1991/1168
- Local Elections (Declaration of Acceptance of Office) (Welsh Forms) Order 1991 SI 1991/1169
- Water Act 1989 (Commencement No. 5) (Scotland) Order 1991 SI 1991/1172
- Control of Pollution Act 1974 (Commencement No. 20) (Scotland) Order 1991 SI 1991/1173
- Public Telecommunication System Designation (Kingdom Cablevision Limited) (Glenrothes ad Kirkcaldy) Order 1991 SI 1991/1174
- Income-related Benefits Schemes and Social Security (Recoupment) Amendment Regulations 1991 SI 1991/1175
- Broadcasting (Restrictions on the Holding of Licences) Order 1991 SI 1991/1176
- Financial Assistance (UK 2000 Scotland) (Scotland) Order 1991 SI 1991/1179
- Act of Sederunt (Rules of the Court of Session Amendment No.5) (Prevention of Terrorism) 1991 SI 1991/1183
- County Courts (Interest on Judgment Debts) Order 1991 SI 1991/1184
- National Health Service (Service Committees and Tribunal) (Scotland) Amendment Regulations 1991 SI 1991/1188
- Valuation and Community Charge Tribunals (Amendment) (Allowances) (No. 2) Regulations 1991 SI 1991/1189
- Representation of the People (Amendment) Regulations 1991 SI 1991/1198
- Electricity (Supply, Transmission and Generating Companies) (Target Investment Limits) Order 1991 SI 1991/1199

== 1201–1300 ==
- International Organisations (Tax Exempt Securities) Order 1991 SI 1991/1202
- Local Government Superannuation (Reserve Forces) Regulations 1991 SI 1991/1203
- Companies (Fees) Regulations 1991 SI 1991/1206
- Common Investment Scheme 1991 SI 1991/1209
- High Court (Distribution of Business) Order 1991 SI 1991/1210
- Matrimonial and Family Proceedings Act 1984 (Commencement No. 5) Order 1991 SI 1991/1211
- Channel Tunnel Rail Link (Effective Joining) Order 1991 SI 1991/1212
- Veterinary Surgeons Qualifications (EEC Recognition) (German Democratic Republic Qualifications) Order 1991 SI 1991/1218
- Dangerous Vessels (Northern Ireland) Order 1991 SI 1991/1219
- Planning(Northern Ireland) Order 1991 SI 1991/1220
- European Communities (Employment in the Civil Service) Order 1991 SI 1991/1221
- County Court Remedies Regulations 1991 SI 1991/1222
- Criminal Justice (International Co-operation) Act 1990 (Designation of Prosecuting Authorities) Order 1991 SI 1991/1224
- Coal Industry (Restructuring Grants) Order 1991 SI 1991/1225
- Representation of the People (Scotland) Amendment Regulations 1991 SI 1991/1226
- Court Funds (Amendment) Rules 1991 SI 1991/1227
- European Economic Interest Grouping (Fees) (Amendment) Regulations 1991 SI 1991/1228
- Charge Limitation (England) (Maximum Amounts) Order 1991 SI 1991/1230
- Food (Miscellaneous Revocations) Regulations 1991 SI 1991/1231
- Food Protection (Emergency Prohibitions) (Paralytic Shellfish Poisoning) Order 1991 SI 1991/1235
- Channel Tunnel (Emergency Medical Services) (No. 2) Order 1991 SI 1991/1236
- European Parliamentary Elections (Amendment) Regulations 1991 SI 1991/1243
- Representation of the People Act 1990 (Commencement No. 1) Order 1991 SI 1991/1244
- Administration of Justice Act 1982 (Commencement No. 6) Order 1991 SI 1991/1245
- Cable (Excepted Programmes) Order 1991 SI 1991/1246
- Family Proceedings Rules 1991 SI 1991/1247
- Inheritance Tax (Delivery of Accounts) Regulations 1991 SI 1991/1248
- Inheritance Tax (Delivery of Accounts) (Scotland) Regulations 1991 SI 1991/1249
- Inheritance Tax (Delivery of Accounts) (Northern Ireland) Regulations 1991 SI 1991/1250
- Movement of Animals (Restrictions) (Amendment) Order 1991 SI 1991/1251
- Law Reform (Miscellaneous Provisions) (Scotland) Act 1990 (Commencement No. 6) Order 1991 SI 1991/1252
- Civic Government (Scotland) Act 1982 (Licensing of Houses in Multiple Occupation) Order 1991 SI 1991/1253
- Motor Vehicles (Wearing of Seat Belts in Rear Seats by Adults) Regulations 1991 SI 1991/1255
- Financial Services Act 1986 (Delegation) (No. 2) Order 1991 SI 1991/1256
- Sealink, (Transfer of Newhaven Harbour) Harbour Revision Order 1991 SI 1991/1257
- Sealink (Transfer of Heysham Harbour) Harbour Revision Order 1991 SI 1991/1258
- Companies (Forms) (No.2) Regulations 1991 SI 1991/1259
- Registration of Births, Still-Births and Deaths (Prescription of Errors) (Scotland) Regulations 1991 SI 1991/1260
- Adopted Children Register (Form of Entry) (Scotland) Regulations 1991 SI 1991/1261
- A23 Trunk Road (Pease Pottage and Handcross Trunk Road and Slip Road) Order 1991 SI 1991/1263
- Employment Codes of Practice (Revocation) Order 1991 SI 1991/1264
- Education (Information on School Examination Results) (England) Regulations 1991 SI 1991/1265
- Education (School Curriculum and Related Information) (Amendment) Regulations 1991 SI 1991/1278
- New Towns (Transfer of Housing Stock) (Amendment) Regulations 1991 SI 1991/1281
- Smoke Control Areas (Authorised Fuels) Regulations 1991 SI 1991/1282
- A638 Trunk Road (Doncaster North Bridge Relief Road) Order 1991 SI 1991/1283
- Fruit Juices and Fruit Nectars (England, Wales and Scotland) (Amendment) Regulations 1991 SI 1991/1284
- Controlled Drugs (Substances Useful for Manufacture) Regulations 1991 SI 1991/1285
- Customs Duty (Personal Reliefs) (Amendment) Order 1991 SI 1991/1286
- Customs and Excise Duties (Personal Reliefs for Goods Permanently Imported) (Amendment) Order 1991 SI 1991/1287
- Crown Court (Amendment) Rules 1991 SI 1991/1288
- Public Telecommunication System Designation (Comment Cablevision North East Partnership) (Tyneside) Order 1991 SI 1991/1292
- Customs and Excise Duties (Personal Reliefs for Goods Temporarily Imported) (Amendment) Order 1991 SI 1991/1293
- Lee Valley and South Staffordshire (Pipelaying and Other Works) (Codes of Practice) Order 1991 SI 1991/1294
- Food Protection (Emergency Prohibitions) (Paralytic Shellfish Poisoning) (No.2) Order 1991 SI 1991/1295
- Food Protection (Emergency Prohibitions) (Paralytic Shellfish Poisoning) (No.3) Order 1991 SI 1991/1296
- Criminal Justice (International Co-operation) Act 1990 (Exercise of Powers) Order 1991 SI 1991/1297
- Merchant Shipping (Load Lines) (Exemption) (Amendment) Order 1991 SI 1991/1298
- Education (Student Loans) Regulations 1991 SI 1991/1299
- Merchant Shipping (Life-Saving Appliances) (Amendment) Regulations 1991 SI 1991/1300

== 1301–1400 ==
- London Cab Order 1991 SI 1991/1301
- Home-Grown Cereals Authority Levy (Variation) Scheme (Approval) Order 1991 SI 1991/1302
- Home-Grown Cereals Authority (Rate of Levy) Order 1991 SI 1991/1303
- Police Pensions (Additional Voluntary Contributions) Regulations 1991 SI 1991/1304
- Industrial Training (Engineering Construction Board) Order 1991 SI 1991/1305
- Motor Vehicles (Type Approval and Approval Marks) (Fees) Regulations 1991 SI 1991/1318
- Environmental Protection Act 1990 (Commencement No. 8) Order 1991 SI 1991/1319
- Nursing Homes Registration (Scotland) Amendment Regulations 1991 SI 1991/1320
- Street Litter Control Notices Order SI 1991/1324
- Litter Control Areas Order 1991 SI 1991/1325
- Gipsy Encampments (City of Worcester) Order 1991 SI 1991/1326
- Norfolk Ambulance National Health Service Trust (Establishment) Amendment Order 1991 SI 1991/1327
- County Court (Amendment No. 3) Rules 1991 SI 1991/1328
- Rules of the Supreme Court (Amendment No. 2) 1991 SI 1991/1329
- Value Added Tax (General) (Amendment) (No. 2) Regulations 1991 SI 1991/1332
- Water Supply (Water Quality) (Scotland) Amendment Regulations 1991 SI 1991/1333
- Public Telecommunication System Designation (Britannia Cablesystems Solent Limited) Order 1991 SI 1991/1334
- Public Telecommunication System Designation (Clyde Cablevision) (Paisley and Renfrew) Order 1991 SI 1991/1335
- Public Telecommunication System Designation (Telford Telecommunications Limited) Order 1991 SI 1991/1336
- Premium Savings Bonds (Amendment No.2) Regulations 1991 SI 1991/1337
- Farm and Conservation Grant (Variation) Scheme 1991 SI 1991/1338
- Farm Diversification Grant (Variation) (No. 2) Scheme 1991 SI 1991/1339
- County Court (Forms) (Amendment No. 3) Rules 1991 SI 1991/1340
- Merchant Shipping (Radio and Radio-Navigational Equipment Survey) Regulations 1991 SI 1991/1341
- Fishing Vessels (Safety Provisions) (Amendment) Rules 1991 SI 1991/1342
- Food Hygiene (Amendment) Regulations 1991 SI 1991/1343
- Electricity (Standards of Performance) Regulations 1991 SI 1991/1344
- A1 Trunk Road (Haringey) Red Route Experimental Traffic (Amendment) Order 1991 SI 1991/1345
- A1 Trunk Road (Islington) Red Route Experimental Traffic (Amendment) Order 1991 SI 1991/1346
- National Health Service Trusts (Consultation on Dissolution) Regulations 1991 SI 1991/1347
- National Health Service (General Dental Services) Amendment Regulations 1991 SI 1991/1348
- National Health Service (General Dental Services) (Scotland) Amendment Regulations 1991 SI 1991/1349
- Public Telecommunication System Designation (Clyde Cablevision) (Greater Glasgow) Order 1991 SI 1991/1350
- Building Societies (Designation of Qualifying Bodies) (Amendment) Order 1991 SI 1991/1358
- Public Telecommunication System Designation (Britannia Cablesystems Darlington Limited) Order 1991 SI 1991/1359
- Public Telecommunication System Designation (Clyde Cablevision) (Bearsden and Milngavie) Order 1991 SI 1991/1360
- Public Telecommunication System Designation (Clyde Cablevision) (Inverclyde) Order 1991 SI 1991/1361
- Public Telecommunication System Designation (Diamond Cable (Melton Mowbray) Limited) Order 1991 SI 1991/1362
- Public Telecommunication System Designation (Videotron Harrow Limited) Order 1991 SI 1991/1363
- Courts and Legal Services Act 1990 (Commencement No. 5) Order 1991 SI 1991/1364
- Merchant Shipping Act 1970 (Unregistered Fishing Vessels) Regulations 1991 SI 1991/1365
- Merchant Shipping Act 1970 (Unregistered Ships) Regulations 1991 SI 1991/1366
- Merchant Shipping Act 1988 (unregistered Ships) Regulations 1991 SI 1991/1367
- Taxes (Interest Rate) (Amendment No.3) Regulations 1991 SI 1991/1377
- Sea Fish (Specified Sea Areas) (Regulation of Nets and Other Fishing Gear) Order 1991 SI 1991/1380
- Blue Eared Pig Disease Order 1991 SI 1991/1381
- Price Marking Order 1991 SI 1991/1382
- Food Protection (Emergency Prohibitions) (Paralytic Shellfish Poisoning) (No. 3) Revocation Order 1991 SI 1991/1386
- Education Reform Act 1988 (Application of Section 122 to Institutions in Wales) Order 1991 SI 1991/1391
- Medicines (Veterinary Drugs) (Prescription Only) Order 1991 SI 1991/1392
- Consumer Credit (Exempt Agreements) (Amendment) Order 1991 SI 1991/1393
- Family Proceedings Courts (Children Act 1989) Rules 1991 SI 1991/1395
- Eggs (Marketing Standards) (Amendment) Regulations 1991 SI 1991/1396
- Act of Sederunt (Messengers-at-Arms and Sheriff Officers Rules) 1991 SI 1991/1397
- Local Government (Committees and Political Groups) (Amendment) Regulations 1991 SI 1991/1398
- Crop Residues (Restrictions on Burning) Regulations 1991 SI 1991/1399

== 1401–1500 ==
- Erskine Bridge Tolls Extension Order 1991 (SI 1991/1402)
- Housing Renovation etc. Grants (Prescribed Forms and Particulars) (Welsh Forms and Particulars) (Amendment) Regulations 1991 SI 1991/1403
- Merchant Shipping (Fees) (Amendment) Regulations 1991 SI 1991/1404
- Family Proceedings Courts (Constitution) Rules 1991 SI 1991/1405
- Farm Business Non-Capital Grant (Variation) Scheme 1991 SI 1991/1406
- Savings Certificates (Children's Bonus Bonds) Regulations 1991 SI 1991/1407
- Broadcasting (Independent Productions) Order 1991 SI 1991/1408
- Water (Compulsory Works Powers) (Notice) Regulations 1991 SI 1991/1409
- County Council of Humberside (River Hull Tunnel) Scheme 1989 Confirmation Instrument 1991 SI 1991/1411
- Veterinary Surgeons Act 1966 (Schedule 3 Amendment) Order 1991 SI 1991/1412
- Act of Sederunt (Rules of the Court of Session Amendment No.6) (Discharge of Judicial Factors) 1991 SI 1991/1413
- Emergency Protection Order (Transfer of Responsibilities) Regulations 1991 SI 1991/1414
- Food Protection (Emergency Prohibitions) (Paralytic Shellfish Poisoning) (Revocation) Order 1991 SI 1991/1415
- Family Proceedings Courts (Constitution) (Metropolitan Area) Rules 1991 SI 1991/1426
- Education (University Commissioners) Order 1991 SI 1991/1427
- Trade Marks and Service Marks (Amendment) Rules 1991 SI 1991/1431
- Hill Livestock (Compensatory Allowances) (Amendment) (No.2) Regulations 1991 SI 1991/1439
- A406 London North Circular Trunk Road (Improvement between Silver Street and Hall Lane, Supplementary Trunk Road and Slip Roads) Order 1991 SI 1991/1446
- A406 London North Circular Trunk Road (Improvement between Silver Street and Hall Lane Trunk Roads, Slip Roads and Bridge) Order 1991 SI 1991/1447
- Companies Act 1989 (Commencement No. 11) Order 1991 SI 1991/1452
- Education (Inner London Education Authority) (Transfer of Functions) Order 1991 SI 1991/1457
- Education (School Teachers' Pay and Conditions) Order 1991 SI 1991/1459
- Child Abduction and Custody (Parties to Conventions) (Amendment) Order 1991 SI 1991/1461
- Cinemas (Northern Ireland) Order 1991 SI 1991/1462
- Criminal Justice (International Co-operation) Act 1990 (Enforcement of Overseas Forfeiture Orders) Order 1991 SI 1991/1463
- Criminal Justice (International Co-operation) Act 1990 (Enforcement of Overseas Forfeiture Orders) (Northern Ireland) Order 1991 SI 1991/1464
- Drug Trafficking Offences Act 1986 (Designated Countries and Territories) (Amendment) Order 1991 SI 1991/1465
- Fisheries (Amendment) (Northern Ireland) Order 1991 SI 1991/1466
- Confiscation of the Proceeds of Drug Trafficking (Designated Countries and Territories) (Scotland) Order 1991 SI 1991/1467
- Criminal Justice (International Co-operation) Act 1990 (Enforcement of Overseas Forfeiture Orders) (Scotland) Order 1991 SI 1991/1468
- Merchant Shipping (Categorisation of Registries of Overseas Territories) (Amendment) Order 1991 SI 1991/1469
- Gas (Meters) (Amendment) Regulations 1991 SI 1991/1471
- Finance Act 1985 (Interest on Tax) (Prescribed Rate) (No.3) Order 1991 SI 1991/1472
- Cod (Specified Sea Areas) (Prohibition of Fishing) (No. 2) Order 1991 SI 1991/1473
- Medicines (Products for Human Use — Fees) Regulations 1991 SI 1991/1474
- Feeding Stuffs (Amendment) Regulations 1991 SI 1991/1475
- Food Safety (Exports) Regulations 1991 SI 1991/1476
- Welfare of Pigs Regulations 1991 SI 1991/1477
- Parental Responsibility Agreement Regulations 1991 SI 1991/1478
- North Surrey Water Company (Constitution and Regulation) Order 1991 SI 1991/1479
- Winchester–Preston Trunk Road (A34) (Newbury Bypass) Order 1991 SI 1991/1480
- Winchester-Preston Trunk Road (A34) (Newbury Bypass Detrunking) Order 1991 SI 1991/1481
- Winchester-Preston Trunk Road (A34) (Newbury Bypass) Slip Roads Order 1991 SI 1991/1482
- Winchester-Preston Trunk Road (A34) (Newbury Bypass) Slip Roads (No 2) Order 1991 SI 1991/1483
- Advisory Committee on Hazardous Substances Order 1991 SI 1991/1487
- Advisory Committee on Hazardous Substances (Terms of Office) Regulations 1991 SI 1991/1488
- St Mary's Music School (Aided Places) Amendment Regulations 1991 SI 1991/1494
- Education (Assisted Places) (Scotland) Amendment Regulations 1991 SI 1991/1495
- Immigration (Carriers' Liability Prescribed Sum) Order 1991 SI 1991/1497

== 1501–1600 ==
- Public Telecommunication System Designation (Videotron South Limited) (Winchester) Order 1991 SI 1991/1503
- Children (Secure Accommodation) Regulations 1991 SI 1991/1505
- Children's Homes Regulations 1991 SI 1991/1506
- Refuges (Children's Homes and Foster Placements) Regulations 1991 SI 1991/1507
- Education (School Teacher Appraisal) Regulations 1991 SI 1991/1511
- Prosecution of Offences (Custody Time Limits) (Amendment) Regulations 1991 SI 1991/1515
- Financial Services Act 1986 (Schedule 1 (Amendment) and Miscellaneous Exemption) Order 1991 SI 1991/1516
- Police Pensions (Amendment) Regulations 1991 SI 1991/1517
- Building Societies Act 1986 (Continuance of section 41) Order 1991 Approved by both Houses of Parliament SI 1991/1518
- Disability Living Allowance and Disability Working Allowance Act 1991 (Commencement No. 1) Order 1991 SI 1991/1519
- Family Credit (General) Amendment Regulations 1991 SI 1991/1520
- Rent Regulation (Forms and Information etc.) (Scotland) Regulations 1991 SI 1991/1521
- Students' Allowances (Scotland) Regulations 1991 SI 1991/1522
- Wireless Telegraphy Apparatus (Low Power Devices) (Exemption) Regulations 1991 SI 1991/1523
- Motor Vehicles (Tests) (Amendment) (No. 3) Regulations 1991 SI 1991/1525
- Road Vehicles (Construction and Use) (Amendment) (No. 1) Regulations 1991 SI 1991/1526
- Road Vehicles (Construction and Use) (Amendment) (No. 2) Regulations 1991 SI 1991/1527
- Building (Procedure) (Scotland) Amendment (No. 2) Regulations 1991 SI 1991/1528
- Tobacco Products Labelling (Safety) Regulations 1991 SI 1991/1530
- Control of Explosives Regulations 1991 SI 1991/1531
- Food Protection (Emergency Prohibitions) (Paralytic Shellfish Poisoning) (No.4) Order 1991 SI 1991/1533
- Town and Country Planning General Development (Amendment) Order 1991 SI 1991/1536
- Seed Potatoes (Fees) (Amendment) Regulations 1991 SI 1991/1537
- Northern Ireland Act 1974 (Interim Period Extension) Order 1991 SI 1991/1538
- Public Works Loans (Fees) Regulations 1991 SI 1991/1539
- Human Fertilisation and Embryology (Statutory Storage Period) Regulations 1991 SI 1991/1540
- Motor Vehicles (Driving Licences) (Large Goods and Passenger-Carrying Vehicles) (Amendment) (No. 3) Regulations 1991 SI 1991/1541
- North-West of Doncaster-Kendal Trunk Road (Airedale Route) (Bingley to Cottingley Bar Section and Slip Roads) Order 1991 SI 1991/1542
- North-West of Doncaster—Kendal Trunk Road (Airedale Route—Bingley to Kildwick and Link Road) Order 1982 Variation (No. 2) Order 1991 SI 1991/1543
- North-West of Doncaster-Kendal Trunk Road (Airedale Route) (Crossflatts to Cottingley Bar Section) (De-Trunking) Order 1991 SI 1991/1544
- Immigration Appeals (Procedure) (Amendment) Rules 1991 SI 1991/1545
- A5 Trunk Road (Fazeley Two Gates Wilnecote Bypass and Slip Roads) Order 1991 SI 1991/1558
- Income Support (General) Amendment No. 4 Regulations 1991 SI 1991/1559
- British Shipbuilders Regulations 1991 SI 1991/1560
- A40 Trunk Road (Gipsy Corner Junction Improvement, Trunk Road and Slip Roads) Order 1991 SI 1991/1561
- A40 Trunk Road (Western Circus Junction Improvement, Trunk Road and Slip Roads) Order 1991 SI 1991/1562
- Football (Offences) Act 1991 (Commencement) Order 1991 SI 1991/1564
- Football (Offences) (Designation of Football Matches) Order 1991 SI 1991/1565
- Companies Act 1989 (Register of Auditors and Information about Audit Firms) Regulations 1991 SI 1991/1566
- Town and Country Planning (Use Classes) (Amendment) Order 1991 SI 1991/1567
- Environmental Protection Act 1990 (Commencement No. 9) Order 1991 SI 1991/1577
- A38 Trunk Road (Improvement at Twowatersfoot) Order 1991 SI 1991/1581
- Education (Pupils' Attendance Records) Regulations 1991 SI 1991/1582
- Export of Goods (Control) (Amendment No. 7) Order 1991 SI 1991/1583
- Access to Personal Files (Social Services) (Amendment) Regulations 1991 (SI 1991/1587)
- Human Fertilisation and Embryology (Special Exemptions) Regulations 1991 (SI 1991/1588)
- Crop Residues (Restrictions on Burning) (No. 2) Regulations 1991 (SI 1991/1590)
- Hormonal Substances (Food Sources) (Animals) Regulations 1991 (SI 1991/1593)
- Leeds General Infirmary and Associated Hospitals National Health Service Trust (Change of Name) Order 1991 (SI 1991/1594)
- Child Benefit and Social Security (Fixing and Adjustment of Rates) Amendment No. 2 Regulations 1991 (SI 1991/1595)
- Essex Water Company (Constitution and Regulation) Order 1991 (SI 1991/1596)
- Bathing Waters (Classification) Regulations 1991 (SI 1991/1597)
- Housing Benefit and Community Charge Benefits (Miscellaneous) Amendment Regulations 1991 (SI 1991/1599)
- Income Support (Transitional) Amendment Regulations 1991 (SI 1991/1600)

== 1601–1700 ==
- Fodder Plant Seeds (Amendment) Regulations 1991 SI 1991/1601
- Oil and Fibre Plant Seeds (Amendment) Regulations 1991 SI 1991/1602
- Food Protection (Emergency Prohibitions) (Paralytic Shellfish Poisoning) (No.5) Order 1991 SI 1991/1608
- Bathing Waters (Classification) (Scotland) Regulations 1991 SI 1991/1609
- Retirement Benefits Schemes (Restriction on Discretion to Approve) (Small Self-administered Schemes) Regulations 1991 SI 1991/1614
- County Council of Somerset (Bridgwater Bypass) (North) (River Parrett Bridge) Scheme 1988 Confirmation Instrument 1991 SI 1991/1615
- Dartmoor National Park (Restriction of Agricultural Operations) Order 1991 SI 1991/1616
- Social Security (Overlapping Benefits) Amendment (No. 2) Regulations 1991 SI 1991/1617
- Control of Pollution (Amendment) Act 1989 (Commencement) Order 1991 SI 1991/1618
- Isle of Wight Light Railway Order 1991 (SI 1991/1619)
- Construction Products Regulations 1991 SI 1991/1620
- Act of Sederunt (Rules of the Court of Session Amendment No.7) (Patents Rules) 1991 SI 1991/1621
- Controlled Waste (Registration of Carriers and Seizure of Vehicles) Regulations 1991 SI 1991/1624
- Recovery of Tax in Summary Proceedings (Financial Limits) Order 1991 SI 1991/1625
- Design Right (Proceedings before Comptroller) (Amendment) Rules 1991 SI 1991/1626
- Patents (Fees) Rules 1991 SI 1991/1627
- Registered Designs (Fees) Rules 1991 SI 1991/1628
- Public Telecommunication System Designation (Oxford Cable Limited) Order 1991 SI 1991/1629
- Farm and Conservation Grant Regulations 1991 SI 1991/1630
- Farm Woodland (Variation) Scheme 1991 Approved by both Houses of Parliament SI 1991/1631
- Social Security (Contributions) Amendment (No.4) Regulations 1991 SI 1991/1632
- Broads Authority (Pilotage Powers) Order 1991 SI 1991/1633
- Representation of the People Act 1991 (Commencement) Order 1991 SI 1991/1634
- Import and Export (Plant Health Fees) (England and Wales) (Amendment) Order 1991 SI 1991/1640
- North Hull Housing Action Trust (Area and Constitution) Order 1991 Approved by both Houses of Parliament SI 1991/1641
- Human Organ Transplants and the United Kingdom Transplant Support Service Authority (Miscellaneous Amendments) Regulations 1991 SI 1991/1645
- Companies (Disclosure of Interests in Shares) (Orders imposing restrictions on shares) Regulations 1991 SI 1991/1646
- Public Telecommunication System Designation (Mercury Personal Communications Network Limited) Order 1991 SI 1991/1647
- Public Telecommunication System Designation (Microtel Communications Limited) Order 1991 SI 1991/1648
- Public Telecommunication System Designation (Unitel Limited) Order 1991 SI 1991/1649
- Income Support (General) Amendment (No. 5) Regulations 1991 SI 1991/1656
- Education (National Curriculum) (Exceptions) (Wales) Regulations 1991 SI 1991/1657
- Education (School Curriculum and Related Information) (Wales) Regulations 1991 SI 1991/1658
- Treasury Bills (Amendment) Regulations 1991 SI 1991/1667
- Education (National Curriculum) (Attainment Targets and Programmes of Study in History) (Wales) (Amendment) Order 1991 SI 1991/1668
- Civil Aviation Authority Regulations 1991 SI 1991/1672
- Police (Discipline) (Amendment) Regulations 1991 SI 1991/1673
- Representation of the People (Northern Ireland) (Variation of Specified Documents and Amendment) Regulations 1991 SI 1991/1674
- European Parliamentary Elections (Northern Ireland) (Amendment) Regulations 1991 SI 1991/1675
- Slaughter of Poultry (Licences and Specified Qualifications) Regulations 1991 SI 1991/1676
- Children (Allocation of Proceedings) Order 1991 SI 1991/1677
- Air Navigation (Restriction of Flying) (High Security Prisons) (Amendment) Regulations 1991 SI 1991/1679
- National Health Service (Optical Charges and Payments) Amendment Regulations 1991 SI 1991/1680
- Food Protection (Emergency Prohibitions) (Paralytic Shellfish Poisoning) (No.6) Order 1991 SI 1991/1681
- Testing in Primary Schools (Scotland) Amendment Regulations 1991 SI 1991/1682
- Education (National Curriculum) (Attainment Targets and Programmes of Study in Welsh) (Amendment) Order 1991 SI 1991/1683
- Deposit Protection Board (Increase of Borrowing Limit) Order 1991 SI 1991/1684
- House of Commons Members' Fund (Variation) Order 1991 SI 1991/1685
- Representation of the People Act 1990 (Commencement No. 2) Order 1991 (SI 1991/1686)
- Returning Officers' Charges Order 1991 SI 1991/1687
- Returning Officer's Charges (Northern Ireland) Order 1991 SI 1991/1688
- Child Minding and Day Care (Applications for Registration) Regulations 1991 SI 1991/1689
- Price Marking (Amendment) Order 1991 SI 1991/1690
- Public Telecommunication System Designation (General Cable Limited)(Bradford) Order 1991 SI 1991/1691
- A11 Trunk Road (Besthorpe to Wymondham Improvement) Detrunking Order 1991 SI 1991/1692
- A11 Trunk Road (Besthorpe to Wymondham Improvement and Slip Roads) Order 1991 SI 1991/1693
- International Organisations (Miscellaneous Exemptions) Order 1991 SI 1991/1694
- Taxes (Interest Rate) (Amendment No. 4) Regulations 1991 SI 1991/1695
- Army, Air Force and Naval Discipline Acts (Continuation) Order 1991 SI 1991/1696
- Air Navigation (Overseas Territories) (Amendment) (No. 2) Order 1991 SI 1991/1697
- Child Abduction and Custody (Parties to Conventions) (Amendment) (No.2) Order 1991 SI 1991/1698
- Extradition (Aviation Security) Order 1991 SI 1991/1699
- Extradition (Designated Commonwealth Countries) Order 1991 SI 1991/1700

== 1701–1800 ==
- Extradition (Drug Trafficking) Order 1991 SI 1991/1701
- Extradition (Torture) Order 1991 SI 1991/1702
- Merchant Shipping Act 1988 (Bermuda) Order 1991 SI 1991/1703
- Vienna Document (Privileges and Immunities) Order 1991 SI 1991/1704
- Dentists Act 1984 (Dental Auxiliaries) Amendment Order 1991 SI 1991/1705
- Dental Auxiliaries (Amendment) Regulations 1991 SI 1991/1706
- Access to Personal Files and Medical Reports (Northern Ireland) Order 1991 SI 1991/1707
- Appropriation (No. 2) (Northern Ireland) Order 1991 SI 1991/1708
- Broadcasting Act 1990 (Guernsey) (No. 2) Order 1991 SI 1991/1709
- Broadcasting Act 1990 (Jersey) (No. 2) Order 1991 SI 1991/1710
- Criminal Justice (Northern Ireland) Order 1991 SI 1991/1711
- Disability Living Allowance and Disability Working Allowance (Northern Ireland) Order 1991 SI 1991/1712
- Fair Employment (Amendment) (Northern Ireland) Order 1991 SI 1991/1713
- Genetically Modified Organisms (Northern Ireland) Order 1991 SI 1991/1714
- Local Elections (Northern Ireland) (Amendment) Order 1991 SI 1991/1715
- Nuclear Material (Offences) Act 1983 (Commencement) Order 1991 SI 1991/1716
- Nuclear Material (Offences) Act 1983 (Guernsey) Order 1991 SI 1991/1717
- Nuclear Material (Offences) Act 1983 (Jersey) Order 1991 SI 1991/1718
- Nuclear Material (Offences) Act 1983 (Isle of Man) Order 1991 SI 1991/1719
- Extradition (Protection of Nuclear Material) Order 1991 SI 1991/1720
- Statistics (Confidentiality) (Northern Ireland) Order 1991 SI 1991/1721
- Territorial Sea Act 1987 (Isle of Man) Order 1991 SI 1991/1722
- Family Law Act 1986 (Dependent Territories) Order 1991 SI 1991/1723
- Reciprocal Enforcement of Foreign Judgments (Canada) (Amendment) Order 1991 SI 1991/1724
- Films Co-Production Agreements (Amendment) Order 1991 SI 1991/1725
- Air Navigation (Second Amendment) Order 1991 SI 1991/1726
- Motor Vehicles (International Circulation) (Amendment) (No. 2) Order 1991 SI 1991/1727
- Transfer of Functions (Returning Officers' Charges) Order 1991 SI 1991/1728
- Building Societies Act 1986 (Modifications) Order 1991 SI 1991/1729
- Local Government Finance (Repeals and Consequential Amendments) Order 1991 SI 1991/1730
- National Health Service (Optical Charges and Payments) (Scotland) Amendment Regulations 1991 SI 1991/1731
- Hearing Aid Council (Disciplinary Proceedings) Legal Assessor (Amendment) Rules 1991 SI 1991/1732
- Mid Southern Water Company (Constitution and Regulation) Order 1991 SI 1991/1733
- Public Telecommunication System Designation (Northampton Cable Television Limited) (Northeast Northamptonshire) Order 1991 SI 1991/1734
- Agricultural Marketing Act 1958 and Milk Marketing Schemes (Amendment) (Scotland) Regulations 1991 SI 1991/1735
- United Kingdom Atomic Energy Authority (Limit on Borrowing) Order 1991 SI 1991/1736
- Free Zone (Birmingham Airport) Designation Order 1991 SI 1991/1737
- Free Zone (Liverpool) Designation Order 1991 SI 1991/1738
- Free Zone (Prestwick Airport) Designation Order 1991 SI 1991/1739
- Free Zone (Southampton) Designation Order 1991 SI 1991/1740
- Finance Act 1991 (Savings-related Share Option Schemes) (Appointed Day) Order 1991 SI 1991/1741
- Dangerous Dogs Act 1991 (Commencement and Appointed Day) Order 1991 SI 1991/1742
- Dangerous Dogs (Designated Types) Order 1991 SI 1991/1743
- Dangerous Dogs Compensation and Exemption Schemes Order 1991 SI 1991/1744
- Montrose Harbour Revision Order 1991 SI 1991/1745
- Disability Living Allowance Advisory Board Regulations 1991 SI 1991/1746
- Social Security (Severe Disablement Allowance) Amendment Regulations 1991 SI 1991/1747
- Legal Aid (Disclosure of Information) Regulations 1991 SI 1991/1753
- Value Added Tax Act 1983 (Interest on Overpayments etc.) (Prescribed Rate) Order 1991 SI 1991/1754
- Car Tax (Amendment) Regulations 1991 SI 1991/1755
- Ecclesiastical Judges and Legal Officers (Fees) Order 1991 SI 1991/1756
- Legal Officers (Annual Fees) Order 1991 SI 1991/1757
- Parochial Fees Order 1991 SI 1991/1758
- Northern Ireland (Emergency Provisions) Regulations 1991 SI 1991/1759
- River Colne Barrier (Wivenhoe) Order 1991 SI 1991/1760
- Education (Assisted Places) (Amendment) Regulations 1991 SI 1991/1767
- Education (Training Grants) (Amendment) Regulations 1991 SI 1991/1768
- Diseases of Animals (Approved Disinfectants) (Amendment) (No. 3) Order 1991 SI 1991/1770
- Swansea Bay Port Health Authority Order 1991 SI 1991/1773
- Weights and Measures (Local and Working Standard Weights and Testing Equipment) (Amendment) Regulations 1991 SI 1991/1775
- Banking Act 1987 (Meaning of Deposit) Order 1991 SI 1991/1776
- Plant Health (Great Britain) (Amendment) (No. 2) Order 1991 SI 1991/1777
- Public Telecommunication System Designation (Videotron Thamesmead Limited) Order 1991 SI 1991/1778
- Public Telecommunication System Designation (West Midlands Cable Communications Limited) Order 1991 SI 1991/1779
- Local Government (Interest on Repayments of Rates) (Scotland) Order 1991 SI 1991/1780
- Administration of Justice Act 1982 (Commencement No. 7) Order 1991 SI 1991/1786
- Building Societies (Liquid Asset) (Amendment) Regulations 1991 SI 1991/1785
- Administration of Justice Act 1982 (Commencement No. 7) Order 1991 SI 1991/1786
- Education (London Residuary Body) (Property Transfer) (No. 3) Order 1991 SI 1991/1787
- Companies House Trading Fund Order 1991 SI 1991/1795
- Patent Office Trading Fund Order 1991 SI 1991/1796
- Merchant Shipping (Light Dues) (Amendment) (No. 2) Regulations 1991 SI 1991/1797
- Gaming Licence Duty Regulations 1991 SI 1991/1798
- A49 Trunk Road (Onibury to Stokesay Improvement) Order 1991 SI 1991/1799
- Food Protection (Emergency Prohibitions) (Paralytic Shellfish Poisoning) (No.2 Partial Revocation) and (Nos.4 and 5 Revocation) Order 1991 SI 1991/1800

== 1801–1900 ==
- Children (Allocation of Proceedings) (Appeals) Order 1991 SI 1991/1801
- Education (Bursaries for Teacher Training) (Amendment) Regulations 1991 SI 1991/1804
- Dartford-Thurrock Crossing (Amendment) Regulations 1991 SI 1991/1805
- Dartford-Thurrock Crossing Tolls Order 1991 SI 1991/1808
- Civil Courts (Amendment) Order 1991 SI 1991/1809
- Food Protection (Emergency Prohibitions) (Paralytic Shellfish Poisoning) (No.7) Order 1991 SI 1991/1810
- Forth Ports Authority (Rateable Values) (Scotland) Order 1991 SI 1991/1811
- Caledonian MacBrayne Limited (Rateable Values) (Scotland) Order 1991 SI 1991/1812
- Education (School Curriculum and Related Information) (Wales) (Amendment) Regulations 1991 SI 1991/1813
- The Halton (Parishes) Order 1991 S.I. 1991/1814
- Register of County Court Judgments (Amendment) Regulations 1991 SI 1991/1815
- Criminal Justice (International Co-operation) Act 1990 (Detention and Forfeiture of Drug Trafficking Cash) Order 1991 SI 1991/1816
- Merchant Shipping (Certification of Deck Officers and Marine Engineer Officers) (Amendment) Regulations 1991 SI 1991/1819
- Broadcasting (Prescribed Countries) Order 1991 SI 1991/1820
- Petty Sessional Divisions (Hampshire) Order 1991 SI 1991/1828
- Education (Assisted Places) (Incidental Expenses) (Amendment) Regulations 1991 SI 1991/1830
- Education (Grants) (Music and Ballet Schools) (Amendment) Regulations 1991 SI 1991/1831
- Family Proceedings (Costs) Rules 1991 SI 1991/1832
- Public Telecommunication System Designation (Windsor Television Limited) (Iver Heath and Laleham) Order 1991 SI 1991/1833
- Water Supply (Water Quality) (Amendment) Regulations 1991 SI 1991/1837
- Education (Mandatory Awards) Regulations 1991 SI 1991/1838
- Education (Fees and Awards) (Amendment) (No. 2) Regulations 1991 SI 1991/1839
- Education (Teachers) (Amendment) (No.2) Regulations 1991 SI 1991/1840
- A12 Trunk Road (Eastern Avenue, Redbridge) (Prohibition of Right Turn and U-Turns) Order 1991 SI 1991/1842
- Temporary Set-Aside Regulations 1991 SI 1991/1847
- Food Protection (Emergency Prohibitions) (Paralytic Shellfish Poisoning) (No.2) Order 1991 Revocation Order 1991 SI 1991/1848
- Food Protection (Emergency Prohibitions) (Paralytic Shellfish Poisoning) (No.8) Order 1991 SI 1991/1849
- Education (National Curriculum) (Assessment Arrangements for Welsh Second Language) (Key Stage 1) Order 1991 SI 1991/1851
- Newport (Gwent) Harbour Revision Order 1991 SI 1991/1852
- Falmouth Harbour Revision Order 1991 SI 1991/1853
- Education (National Curriculum) (Assessment Arrangements for English, Welsh, Mathematics and Science) (Key Stage 1) (Wales) Order 1991 SI 1991/1860
- Food Protection (Emergency Prohibitions) (Poisonous Substances in Cattle) (Wales) Order 1991 SI 1991/1863
- M6 Motorway (Widening and Improvements Between Junctions 30 and 32) and Connecting Roads Scheme 1991 SI 1991/1873
- School Teachers' Pay and Conditions Act 1991 (Commencement No. 1) Order 1991 SI 1991/1874
- A38 Trunk Road (Bell Bridge to Alrewas Improvements) (Fradley Lane Slip Roads) Order 1991 SI 1991/1875
- Non-Contentious Probate (Amendment) Rules 1991 SI 1991/1876
- County Court Appeals Order 1991 SI 1991/1877
- Social Security (Adjudication) Amendment Regulations 1991 SI 1991/1878
- Sheep Scab (National Dip) (Amendment) Order 1991 SI 1991/1879
- Adoption (Amendment) Rules 1991 SI 1991/1880
- Children Act 1989 (Consequential Amendment of Enactments) Order 1991 SI 1991/1881
- County Court (Amendment No. 4) Rules 1991 SI 1991/1882
- Courts and Legal Services Act 1990 (Commencement No. 6) Order 1991 SI 1991/1883
- Rules of the Supreme Court (Amendment No. 3) 1991 SI 1991/1884
- Agricultural Holdings (Units of Production) Order 1991 SI 1991/1888
- Human Fertilisation and Embryology Authority (Licence Committees and Appeals) Regulations 1991 SI 1991/1889
- Education (Financial Delegation for Primary Schools) Regulations 1991 SI 1991/1890
- Gaming (Records of Cheques) (Amendment) Regulations 1991 SI 1991/1892
- Restrictive Trade Practices (Standards and Arrangements) (Goods) Order 1991 SI 1991/1896
- Restrictive Trade Practices (Standards and Arrangements) (Services) Order 1991 SI 1991/1897
- Trade Marks and Service Marks (Fees) Rules 1991 SI 1991/1898
- Housing (Change of Landlord) (Payment of Disposal Cost by Instalments) (Amendment) Regulations 1991 SI 1991/1899

== 1901–2000 ==
- Law Reform (Miscellaneous Provisions) (Scotland) Act 1990 (Commencement No. 7) Order 1991 SI 1991/1903
- Civil Legal Aid (Scotland) Amendment (No. 2) Regulations 1991 SI 1991/1904
- Soft Fruit Plants (Scotland) Order 1991 SI 1991/1905
- Agriculture (Power Take-off) (Amendment) Regulations 1991 SI 1991/1913
- Notification of New Substances (Amendment) Regulations 1991 SI 1991/1914
- Act of Sederunt (Rules of the Court of Session Amendment No. 8) (Discharge of Judicial Factors) 1991 SI 1991/1915
- Act of Adjournal (Consolidation Amendment No. 2) (Evidence of Children) 1991 SI 1991/1916
- Combined Probation Areas (Hampshire) Order 1991 SI 1991/1917
- Act of Sederunt (Proceedings in the Sheriff Court under the Debtors (Scotland) Act 1987) (Amendment) 1991 SI 1991/1920
- Health and Safety (Fees) Regulations 1991 SI 1991/1921
- Offshore Installations (Safety Zones) (No. 3) Order 1991 SI 1991/1922
- Magistrates' Courts (Detention and Forfeiture of Drug Trafficking Cash) Rules 1991 SI 1991/1923
- Legal Aid Act 1988 (Children Act 1989) Order 1991 SI 1991/1924
- Legal Aid in Criminal and Care Proceedings (General) (Amendment) (No.2) Regulations 1991 SI 1991/1925
- Domestic Property (Valuation) Regulations 1991 SI 1991/1934
- Social Security (Contributions) Amendment (No. 5) Regulations 1991 SI 1991/1935
- Agricultural Mortgage Corporation (Specified Day for Repeals) Order 1991 SI 1991/1937
- Social Security (Industrial Injuries) (Prescribed Diseases) Amendment Regulations 1991 SI 1991/1938
- Protection from Eviction (Excluded Licences) Order 1991 SI 1991/1943
- Food Protection (Emergency Prohibitions) (Poisonous Substances in Cattle) (Wales) (Revocation) Order 1991 SI 1991/1944
- Land Registration Fees Order 1991 SI 1991/1948
- Consumer Credit (Exempt Agreements) (Amendment) (No. 2) Order 1991 SI 1991/1949
- Social Security (Adjudication) Amendment (No. 2) Regulations 1991 SI 1991/1950
- Gipsy Encampments (District of Corby) Order 1991 SI 1991/1951
- Food Protection (Emergency Prohibitions) (Paralytic Shellfish Poisoning) (No. 10) Order 1991 SI 1991/1958
- Pilotage Act 1987 (Cessation of Temporary Arbitration Procedure) Order and Regulations 1991 SI 1991/1959
- Police (Promotion) (Amendment) Regulations 1991 SI 1991/1961
- Leicester North Station Light Railway Order 1991 (SI 1991/1965)
- Justices of the Peace (Size and Chairmanship of Bench) (Amendment) Rules 1991 SI 1991/1966
- Goods Vehicles (Operators' Licences, Qualifications and Fees) (Amendment) Regulations 1991 SI 1991/1969
- Motor Vehicles (Type Approval for Goods Vehicles) (Great Britain) (Amendment) (No. 2) Regulations 1991 SI 1991/1970
- Motor Vehicles (Type Approval) (Great Britain) (Amendment) (No.2) Regulations 1991 SI 1991/1971
- Barnet (Prescribed Route) (No. 3) Traffic Order 1970 (Variation) Order 1991 SI 1991/1972
- Education (Grant) (Amendment) Regulations 1991 SI 1991/1975
- Education (Higher Education Corporations) (Wales) Order 1991 SI 1991/1976
- Public Telecommunication System Designation (Diamond Cable (Grantham) Limited) Order 1991 SI 1991/1977
- Scottish Agricultural Securities Corporation (Specified Day for Repeals) Order 1991 SI 1991/1978
- Motor Vehicles (Designation of Approval Marks) (Amendment) Regulations 1991 SI 1991/1979
- Telford Development Corporation (Transfer of Property and Dissolution) Order 1991 SI 1991/1980
- Adopted Persons (Birth Records) Regulations 1991 SI 1991/1981
- Foreign Fields (Specification) Order 1991 SI 1991/1982
- Foreign Fields (Specification) (No. 2) Order 1991 SI 1991/1983
- Foreign Fields (Specification) (No. 3) Order 1991 SI 1991/1984
- Children Act 1989 (Commencement No. 2—Amendment and Transitional Provisions) Order 1991 SI 1991/1990
- Family Proceedings Courts (Matrimonial Proceedings etc.) Rules 1991 SI 1991/1991
- Blue Eared Pig Disease (Amendment) Order 1991 SI 1991/1992
- Set-Aside (Amendment) Regulations 1991 SI 1991/1993
- Milk Quota (Calculation of Standard Quota) (Amendment) Order 1991 SI 1991/1994
- Employment Action (Miscellaneous Provisions) Order 1991 SI 1991/1995
- Companies Act 1989 (Commencement No. 12 and Transitional Provision) Order 1991 SI 1991/1996
- Companies Act 1989 (Eligibility for Appointment as Company Auditor) (Consequential Amendments) Regulations 1991 SI 1991/1997
- Companies (Inspection and Copying of Registers, Indices and Documents) Regulations 1991 SI 1991/1998
- Insurance Companies Regulations 1981 (Amendment) Regulations 1991 SI 1991/1999
- Official Listing of Securities (Change of Competent Authority) Regulations 1991 SI 1991/2000

== 2001–2100 ==
- National Health Service Supplies Authority (Establishment and Constitution) Order 1991 SI 1991/2001
- National Health Service Supplies Authority Regulations 1991 SI 1991/2002
- Road Vehicles (Construction and Use) (Amendment) (No. 3) Regulations 1991 SI 1991/2003
- Road Traffic Accidents (Payments for Treatment) Order 1991 SI 1991/2005
- Local Government Act 1988 (Defined Activities) (Competition) (England) (Amendment) Regulations 1991 SI 1991/2006
- River Tweed (Baits and Lures) Regulations 1991 SI 1991/2007
- Tendring Hundred Waterworks Company (Constitution and Regulation) Order 1991 SI 1991/2018
- Weighing Equipment (Non-automatic Weighing Machines) (Amendment) Regulations 1991 SI 1991/2019
- Food Protection (Emergency Prohibitions) (Paralytic Shellfish Poisoning) (No. 11) Order 1991 SI 1991/2020
- Extension of the Vehicles (Excise) Act 1971 to Northern Ireland (Commencement) Order 1991 SI 1991/2021
- Domestic Property (Valuation) (Scotland) Regulations 1991 SI 1991/2022
- Adoption Allowance Regulations 1991 SI 1991/2030
- Children and Young Persons (Designation of Isle of Man Orders) Order 1991 SI 1991/2031
- Children (Prescribed Orders — Northern Ireland, Guernsey and Isle of Man) Regulations 1991 SI 1991/2032
- Children (Representations, Placements and Reviews) (Miscellaneous Amendments) Regulations 1991 SI 1991/2033
- Children (Secure Accommodation) (No. 2) Regulations 1991 SI 1991/2034
- Probation (Amendment) Rules 1991 SI 1991/2035
- Civil Legal Aid (General) (Amendment) (No. 2) Regulations 1991 SI 1991/2036
- Legal Aid in Criminal and Care Proceedings (Costs) (Amendment) (No. 3) Regulations 1991 SI 1991/2037
- Legal Aid in Family Proceedings (Remuneration) Regulations 1991 SI 1991/2038
- National Health Service (Determination of Districts) (No. 2) Order 1991 SI 1991/2039
- National Health Service (District Health Authorities) (No. 2) Order 1991 SI 1991/2040
- Regional and District Health Authorities (Membership and Procedure) Amendment (No.2) Regulations 1991 SI 1991/2041
- Maintenance Enforcement Act 1991 (Commencement No. 1) Order 1991 SI 1991/2042
- Gaming (Records of Cheques) (Scotland) (Amendment) Regulations 1991 SI 1991/2047
- Petty Sessional Divisions (Devon) Order 1991 SI 1991/2048
- A11 Trunk Road (Four Went Ways to Newmarket Dualling) Slip Roads Order 1991 SI 1991/2049
- Children (Private Arrangements for Fostering) Regulations 1991 SI 1991/2050
- Guardians Ad Litem and Reporting Officers (Panels) Regulations 1991 SI 1991/2051
- Housing (Right to Buy) (Priority of Charges) (No. 2) Order 1991 SI 1991/2052
- Mortgage Indemnities (Recognised Bodies) Order 1991 SI 1991/2053
- Road Traffic Act 1991 (Commencement No. 1) Order 1991 SI 1991/2054
- Medicines (Fees Relating to Medicinal Products for Animal Use) (Amendment) Regulations 1991 SI 1991/2063
- Planning and Compensation Act 1991 (Commencement No.1 and Transitional Provisions) Order 1991 SI 1991/2067
- Taxes (Interest Rate) (Amendment No. 5) Regulations 1991 SI 1991/2070
- Child Minding and Day Care (Registration and Inspection Fees) Regulations 1991 SI 1991/2076
- Food Protection (Emergency Prohibitions) (Paralytic Shellfish Poisoning) (No. 12) Order 1991 SI 1991/2077
- Food Protection (Emergency Prohibitions) (Paralytic Shellfish Poisoning) (No. 7 and No. 10) Orders 1991 Revocation Order 1991 SI 1991/2078
- Cod and Sole (Specified Sea Areas) (Prohibition of Fishing) Order 1991 SI 1991/2085
- Building Societies (Accounts and Related Provisions) (Amendment) Regulations 1991 SI 1991/2086
- Excise Duties (Goods Imported for Testing, etc.) Relief Order 1991 SI 1991/2089
- Planning and Compensation Act 1991 (Commencement No. 2 and Transitional Provisions) (Scotland) Order 1991 SI 1991/2092
- Fees in the Registers of Scotland Order 1991 SI 1991/2093
- Disqualification for Caring for Children Regulations 1991 SI 1991/2094
- M25 Motorway (A13 to A12 Section) (Mar Dyke Connecting Roads) Scheme 1975 and the M25 Motorway (A13 to A12 Section and Connecting Roads) Scheme 1975, Variation Scheme 1991 SI 1991/2095
- Magistrates' Courts (Costs Against Legal Representatives in Civil Proceedings) Rules 1991 SI 1991/2096
- Packaging of Explosives for Carriage Regulations 1991 SI 1991/2097
- Agricultural or Forestry Tractors and Tractor Components (Type Approval) (Fees) Regulations 1991 SI 1991/2098
- Juvenile Courts (Constitution) (Amendment) Rules 1991 SI 1991/2099

== 2101–2200 ==
- Child Benefit (General) Amendment Regulations 1991 SI 1991/2105
- Criminal Justice (International Co-operation) Act 1990 (Commencement No. 2) Order 1991 SI 1991/2108
- Non-Domestic Rating (Payment of Interest) (Amendment) Regulations 1991 SI 1991/2111
- Legal Aid in Family Proceedings (Remuneration) (Amendment) Regulations 1991 SI 1991/2112
- Family Proceedings (Amendment) Rules 1991 SI 1991/2113
- Family Proceedings Fees Order 1991 SI 1991/2114
- Annual Close Time (River Nairn Salmon Fishery District) Order 1991 SI 1991/2115
- Broadcasting (Foreign Satellite Programmes) (Specified Countries) Order 1991 SI 1991/2124
- Road Vehicles (Construction and Use) (Amendment) (No. 4) Regulations 1991 SI 1991/2125
- Food Protection (Emergency Prohibitions) (Paralytic Shellfish Poisoning) (No.8) Order 1991 Revocation Order 1991 SI 1991/2126
- Companies Act 1985 (Disclosure of Remuneration for Non-Audit Work) Regulations 1991 SI 1991/2128
- Child Minding and Day Care (Applications for Registration and Inspection Fees) (Amendment) Regulations 1991 SI 1991/2129
- Adoption Allowance (Amendment) Regulations 1991 SI 1991/2130
- The Stroud (Parishes) (No. 2) Order 1990 S.I. 1991/2133
- Bure Valley Railway Light Railway (Amendment) Order 1991 (SI 1991/2136)
- Public Telecommunication System Designation (Broadland Cablevision Limited) Order 1991 SI 1991/2141
- Public Telecommunication System Designation (Kirklees Cable) Order 1991 SI 1991/2142
- Public Telecommunication System Designation (Stafford Communications Limited) Order 1991 SI 1991/2143
- Merchant Shipping (Crew Agreements, Lists of Crew and Discharge of Seamen) Regulations 1991 SI 1991/2144
- Merchant Shipping (Official Log Books) (Amendment) Regulations 1991 SI 1991/2145
- Local Government (Assistants for Political Groups) (Remuneration) Order 1991 SI 1991/2150
- Law Reform (Miscellaneous Provisions) (Scotland) Act 1990 (Commencement No. 8) Order 1991 SI 1991/2151
- Assignation Statement (Prescribed Information) (Scotland) Regulations 1991 SI 1991/2152
- Agricultural Holdings (Specification of Forms) (Scotland) Order 1991 SI 1991/2154
- Education (South West London College Higher Education Corporation) (Dissolution) Order 1991 SI 1991/2155
- Banking Act 1987 (Exempt Transactions) (Amendment No. 2) Regulations 1991 SI 1991/2168
- Education (National Curriculum) (Assessment Arrangements for English, Mathematics and Science) (Key Stage 1) Order 1991 SI 1991/2169
- Education (National Curriculum) (Assessment Arrangements for Technology) (Key Stage 1) Order 1991 SI 1991/2170
- The Cotswold (Parishes) Order 1991 S.I. 1991/2171
- A12 Trunk Road (Eastern Avenue, Redbridge) (Prescribed Routes) Order 1991 SI 1991/2172
- Companies Act 1989 (Commencement No. 13) Order 1991 SI 1991/2173
- Amusements with Prizes (Variation of Fees) Order 1991 SI 1991/2174
- Betting, Gaming and Lotteries Act 1963 (Variation of Fees) Order 1991 SI 1991/2175
- Betting, Gaming and Lotteries Act 1963 (Variation of Fees) (No. 2) Order 1991 SI 1991/2176
- Gaming Act (Variation of Fees) (No. 2) Order 1991 SI 1991/2177
- Lotteries (Registration Authority Fees) Order 1991 SI 1991/2178
- A13 Trunk Road (Ripple Road, Barking and Dagenham) (Prescribed Routes) Order 1991 SI 1991/2180
- Natural Heritage (Scotland) Act 1991 (Commencement No. 1) Order 1991 SI 1991/2187
- Broadcasting (Local Delivery Services) (Amendment) Order 1991 SI 1991/2188
- River Cree Salmon Fishery District (Baits and Lures) Regulations 1991 SI 1991/2192
- Kirklees Light Railway Order 1991 (SI 1991/2194)
- Finance Act 1985 (Interest on Tax) (Prescribed Rate) (No. 4) Order 1991 SI 1991/2195
- Sea Fish Licensing (Variation) Order 1991 SI 1991/2196
- Fertilisers Regulations 1991 SI 1991/2197
- Hops Certification (Amendment) Regulations 1991 SI 1991/2198

== 2201–2300 ==
- Act of Sederunt (Rules for the Registration of Custody Orders of the Sheriff Court) (Amendment) 1991 SI 1991/2205
- Seed Potatoes Regulations 1991 SI 1991/2206
- Criminal Justice Act 1991 (Commencement No. 1) Order 1991 SI 1991/2208
- Grimsby and Louth Light Railway Order 1991 (SI 1991/2210)
- Civil Courts (Amendment No. 2) Order 1991 SI 1991/2211
- Petty Sessional Divisions (Cheshire) Order 1991 SI 1991/2212
- Act of Sederunt (Rules of the Court of Session Amendment No.9) (International Commercial Arbitration) 1991 SI 1991/2213
- Act of Sederunt (Proceedings in the Sheriff Court under the Model Law on International Commercial Arbitration) 1991 SI 1991/2214
- Petty Sessional Divisions (Cambridgeshire) Order 1991 SI 1991/2215
- Motor Vehicles (Tests) (Amendment) (No. 4) Regulations 1991 SI 1991/2229
- Dairy Produce Quotas Regulations 1991 SI 1991/2232
- Rivers Tweed and Eye Protection (Renewal) Order 1991 SI 1991/2234
- River Tummel Catchment Area Protection (Renewal) Order 1991 SI 1991/2235
- River Lunan Catchment Area Protection (Renewal) Order 1991 SI 1991/2236
- Design Right (Semiconductor Topographies) (Amendment) Regulations 1991 SI 1991/2237
- Social Fund Cold Weather Payments (General) Amendment No.2 Regulations 1991 SI 1991/2238
- Goods Vehicles (Operators' Licences, Qualifications and Fees) (Amendment) (No. 2) Regulations 1991 SI 1991/2239
- Education (Teachers) (Amendment) (No. 3) Regulations 1991 SI 1991/2240
- National Health Service (General Medical and Pharmaceutical Services) (Scotland) Amendment (No.2) Regulations 1991 SI 1991/2241
- Beef Carcase (Classification) Regulations 1991 SI 1991/2242
- A406 London North Circular Trunk Road (East London River Crossing (A13 to A2) No. 2 Bridge) Order 1991 SI 1991/2244
- A406 London North Circular Trunk Road (East London River Crossing (A13 to A2) Slip Roads) Order 1991 SI 1991/2245
- Bovine Spongiform Encephalopathy Order 1991 SI 1991/2246
- Dorset, Hampshire, West Sussex and Wiltshire (County Boundaries) Order 1991 SI 1991/2247
- Charging Authorities (Notification of Precept Population) (Wales) (Amendment) (No. 2) Regulations 1991 SI 1991/2259
- Charging Authorities (Population for Precepts) (Wales) (Amendment) (No.2) Regulations 1991 SI 1991/2260
- National Health Service (General Medical and Pharmaceutical Services) Amendment Regulations 1991 SI 1991/2263
- Town and Country Planning General Development (Amendment) (No. 2) Order 1991 SI 1991/2268
- Skye Salmon Fishery District Designation Order 1991 SI 1991/2271
- Planning and Compensation Act 1991 (Commencement No. 3) Order 1991 SI 1991/2272
- Occupational Pension Schemes (Miscellaneous Amendments) Regulations 1991 SI 1991/2273
- Registration of Births and Deaths (Amendment) Regulations 1991 SI 1991/2275
- A41 London–Birmingham Trunk Road (Aston Clinton Bypass and Slip Roads) Order 1991 SI 1991/2280
- A41 London–Birmingham Trunk Road (East of Aylesbury to West of Tring) Detrunking Order 1991 SI 1991/2281
- Value Added Tax Act 1983 (Interest on Overpayments etc.) (Prescribed Rate) (No. 2) Order 1991 SI 1991/2282
- The Forest of Dean (Parishes) Order 1991 S.I. 1991/2283
- Social Security (Miscellaneous Provisions) Amendment Regulations 1991 SI 1991/2284
- Water (Prevention of Pollution) (Code of Practice) Order 1991 SI 1991/2285
- New Roads and Street Works Act 1991 (Commencement No. 1) (Scotland) Order 1991 SI 1991/2286
- New Roads and Street Works Act 1991 (Commencement No. 1) Order 1991 SI 1991/2288
- European Communities (Designation) (No. 3) Order 1991 SI 1991/2289
- Arms Control and Disarmament (Inspections) (Sovereign Base Areas of Akrotiri and Dhekelia) Order 1991 SI 1991/2290
- Consular Fees (Amendment) (No.2) Order 1991 SI 1991/2291
- Dangerous Dogs (Northern Ireland) Order 1991 SI 1991/2292
- Friendly Societies Act 1984 (Guernsey) Order 1991 SI 1991/2293
- Social Security (Contributions)(Northern Ireland) Order 1991 SI 1991/2294
- Access to Health Records (Steps to Secure Compliance and Complaints Procedures) (Scotland) Regulations 1991 SI 1991/2295
- Local Government Reorganisation (Consequential Provision) Order 1991 SI 1991/2296
- Dangerous Dogs Compensation and Exemption Schemes (Amendment) Order 1991 SI 1991/2297

== 2301–2400 ==
- Legal Advice and Assistance (Amendment) (No. 2) Regulations 1991 (SI 1991/2305)
- Value Added Tax (Input Tax) (Person Supplied) Order 1991 (SI 1991/2306)
- Education (Polytechnics and Colleges Funding Council) (Prescribed Expenditure) Regulations 1991 (SI 1991/2307)
- Milk Quota (Calculation of Standard Quota) (Scotland) Amendment Order 1991 (SI 1991/2309)
- Value Added Tax (General) (Amendment) (No. 3) Regulations 1991 (SI 1991/2312)
- Bristol Waterworks Company (Constitution and Regulation) Order 1991 (SI 1991/2313)
- Aintree Hospitals National Health Service Trust (Establishment) Order 1991 (SI 1991/2316)
- Airedale National Health Service Trust (Establishment) Order 1991 SI 1991/2317
- Allington National Health Service Trust (Establishment) Order 1991 SI 1991/2318
- Ashford Hospitals National Health Service Trust (Establishment) Order 1991 SI 1991/2319
- Avon Ambulance Service National Health Service Trust (Establishment) Order 1991 SI 1991/2320
- Aylesbury Vale Community Healthcare National Health Service Trust (Establishment) Order 1991 SI 1991/2321
- Barnet Community Healthcare National Health Service Trust (Establishment) Order 1991 SI 1991/2322
- Barnsley Community and Priority Services National Health Service Trust (Establishment) Order 1991 SI 1991/2323
- Barts National Health Service Trust (Establishment) Order 1991 SI 1991/2324
- Basildon and Thurrock General Hospitals National Health Service Trust (Establishment) Order 1991 SI 1991/2325
- Bassetlaw Hospital and Community Services National Health Service Trust (Establishment) Order 1991 SI 1991/2326
- Bath and West Community National Health Service Trust (Establishment) Order 1991 SI 1991/2327
- Bath Mental Health Care National Health Service Trust (Establishment) Order 1991 SI 1991/2328
- Bedford Hospital National Health Service Trust (Establishment) Order 1991 SI 1991/2329
- Bradford Community Health National Health Service Trust (Establishment) Order 1991 SI 1991/2330
- Burnley Health Care National Health Service Trust (Establishment) Order 1991 SI 1991/2331
- Central Sheffield University Hospitals National Health Service Trust (Establishment) Order 1991 SI 1991/2332
- Clatterbridge Centre for Oncology National Health Service Trust (Establishment) Order 1991 SI 1991/2333
- Income Support (General) Amendment No.6 Regulations 1991 SI 1991/2334
- Cleveland Ambulance National Health Service Trust (Establishment) Order 1991 SI 1991/2335
- Dacorum and St Albans Community National Health Service Trust (Establishment) Order 1991 SI 1991/2336
- Devon Ambulance Service National Health Service Trust (Establishment) Order 1991 SI 1991/2337
- Doncaster Healthcare National Health Service Trust (Establishment) Order 1991 SI 1991/2338
- Dorset Health Care National Health Service Trust (Establishment) Order 1991 SI 1991/2339
- Ealing Hospital National Health Service Trust (Establishment) Order 1991 SI 1991/2340
- East Berkshire National Health Service Trust for People with Learning Disabilities (Establishment) Order 1991 SI 1991/2341
- East Birmingham Hospital National Health Service Trust (Establishment) Order 1991 SI 1991/2342
- East Hertfordshire Health National Health Service Trust (Establishment) Order 1991 SI 1991/2343
- Eastbourne Hospitals National Health Service Trust (Establishment) Order 1991 SI 1991/2344
- Essex Ambulance Service National Health Service Trust (Establishment) Order 1991 SI 1991/2345
- Essex Rivers Healthcare National Health Service Trust (Establishment) Order 1991 SI 1991/2346
- Exeter and District Community Health Service National Health Service Trust (Establishment) Order 1991 SI 1991/2347
- Forest Healthcare National Health Service Trust (Establishment) Order 1991 SI 1991/2348
- Frenchay Healthcare National Health Service Trust (Establishment) Order 1991 SI 1991/2349
- Frimley Park Hospital National Health Service Trust (Establishment) Order 1991 SI 1991/2350
- Gateshead Community Health National Health Service Trust (Establishment) Order 1991 SI 1991/2351
- Gloucestershire Ambulance Service National Health Service Trust (Establishment) Order 1991 SI 1991/2352
- Harefield Hospital National Health Service Trust (Establishment) Order 1991 SI 1991/2353
- Harrogate Health Care National Health Service Trust (Establishment) Order 1991 SI 1991/2354
- Harrow Community Health Services National Health Service Trust (Establishment) Order 1991 SI 1991/2355
- Hastings and Rother National Health Service Trust (Establishment) Order 1991 SI 1991/2356
- Heatherwood and Wexham Park Hospitals' National Health Service Trust (Establishment) Order 1991 SI 1991/2357
- Herefordshire Community Health National Health Service Trust (Establishment) Order 1991 SI 1991/2358
- Hillingdon Community Health National Health Service Trust (Establishment) Order 1991 SI 1991/2359
- Hinchingbrooke Health Care National Health Service Trust (Establishment) Order 1991 SI 1991/2360
- Horizon National Health Service Trust (Establishment) Order 1991 SI 1991/2361
- King's Healthcare National Health Service Trust (Establishment) Order 1991 SI 1991/2362
- King's Lynn and Wisbech Hospitals National Health Service Trust (Establishment) Order 1991 SI 1991/2363
- Lancaster Acute Hospitals National Health Service Trust (Establishment) Order 1991 SI 1991/2364
- Lancaster Priority Services National Health Service Trust (Establishment) Order 1991 SI 1991/2365
- Liverpool Obstetric and Gynaecology Services National Health Service Trust (Establishment) Order 1991 SI 1991/2366
- Luton and Dunstable Hospital Trust National Health Service Trust (Establishment) Order 1991 SI 1991/2367
- Maidstone Priority Care National Health Service Trust (Establishment) Order 1991 SI 1991/2368
- Mersey Regional Ambulance Service National Health Service Trust (Establishment) Order 1991 SI 1991/2369
- Mid Essex Hospital Services National Health Service Trust (Establishment) Order 1991 SI 1991/2370
- Milton Keynes Community Health National Health Service Trust (Establishment) Order 1991 SI 1991/2371
- Milton Keynes General National Health Service Trust (Establishment) Order 1991 SI 1991/2372
- Mulberry National Health Service Trust (Establishment) Order 1991 SI 1991/2373
- New Possibilities National Health Service Trust (Establishment) Order 1991 SI 1991/2374
- North East Essex Mental Health National Health Service Trust (Establishment) Order 1991 SI 1991/2375
- North Mersey Community National Health Service Trust (Establishment) Order 1991 SI 1991/2376
- North Tees Health National Health Service Trust (Establishment) Order 1991 SI 1991/2377
- Northallerton Health Services National Health Service Trust (Establishment) Order 1991 SI 1991/2378
- Northgate National Health Service Trust (Establishment) Order 1991 SI 1991/2379
- Nottingham City Hospital National Health Service Trust (Establishment) Order 1991 SI 1991/2380
- Nottingham Community Health National Health Service Trust (Establishment) Order 1991 SI 1991/2381
- Oldham National Health Service Trust (Establishment) Order 1991 SI 1991/2382
- Optimum Health Services National Health Service Trust (Establishment) Order 1991 SI 1991/2383
- Parkside National Health Service Trust (Establishment) Order 1991 SI 1991/2384
- Phoenix National Health Service Trust (Establishment) Order 1991 SI 1991/2385
- Plymouth Community Services National Health Service Trust (Establishment) Order 1991 SI 1991/2386
- Poole Hospital National Health Service Trust (Establishment) Order 1991 SI 1991/2387
- Premier Health National Health Service Trust (Establishment) Order 1991 SI 1991/2388
- Ravensbourne Priority Health National Health Service Trust (Establishment) Order 1991 SI 1991/2389
- Royal Bournemouth and Christchurch Hospitals National Health Service Trust (Establishment) Order 1991 SI 1991/2390
- Royal Cornwall Hospitals and West Cornwall Hospital National Health Service Trust (Establishment) Order 1991 SI 1991/2391
- Royal United Hospital, Bath, National Health Service Trust (Establishment) Order 1991 SI 1991/2392
- Royal Victoria Infirmary and Associated Hospitals National Health Service Trust (Establishment) Order 1991 SI 1991/2393
- St Helens and Knowsley Community Health National Health Service Trust (Establishment) Order 1991 SI 1991/2394
- St Mary's National Health Service Trust (Establishment) Order 1991 SI 1991/2395
- St Peter's Hospital National Health Service Trust (Establishment) Order 1991 SI 1991/2396
- St Thomas' Hospital National Health Service Trust (Establishment) Order 1991 SI 1991/2397
- Scarborough and North East Yorkshire Health Care National Health Service Trust (Establishment) Order 1991 SI 1991/2398
- Sheffield Children's Hospital National Health Service Trust (Establishment) Order 1991 SI 1991/2399
- South Bedfordshire Community Health Care National Health Service Trust (Establishment) Order 1991 SI 1991/2400

== 2401–2500 ==
- South Downs Health National Health Service Trust (Establishment) Order 1991 SI 1991/2401
- South Tees Acute Hospitals National Health Service Trust (Establishment) Order 1991 SI 1991/2402
- South Warwickshire Health Care National Health Service Trust (Establishment) Order 1991 SI 1991/2403
- South Yorkshire Metropolitan Ambulance and Paramedic Service National Health Service Trust (Establishment) Order 1991 SI 1991/2404
- Southend Community Care Services National Health Service Trust (Establishment) Order 1991 SI 1991/2405
- Southmead Health Services National Health Service Trust (Establishment) Order 1991 SI 1991/2406
- Southport and Formby National Health Service Trust (Establishment) Order 1991 SI 1991/2407
- Staffordshire Ambulance Service National Health Service Trust (Establishment) Order 1991 SI 1991/2408
- Thameslink Healthcare Services National Health Service Trust (Establishment) Order 1991 SI 1991/2409
- Walsgrave Hospital National Health Service Trust (Establishment) Order 1991 SI 1991/2410
- Walton Centre for Neurology and Neurosurgery National Health Service Trust (Establishment) Order 1991 SI 1991/2411
- Wellhouse National Health Service Trust (Establishment) Order 1991 SI 1991/2412
- West Lambeth Community Care National Health Service Trust (Establishment) Order 1991 SI 1991/2413
- Weston Park Hospital National Health Service Trust (Establishment) Order 1991 SI 1991/2414
- Weybourne Community National Health Service Trust (Establishment) Order 1991 SI 1991/2415
- Wiltshire Health Care National Health Service Trust (Establishment) Order 1991 SI 1991/2416
- Wrightington Hospital National Health Service Trust (Establishment) Order 1991 SI 1991/2417
- York Health Services National Health Service Trust (Establishment) Order 1991 SI 1991/2418
- Pensions Increase (Approved Schemes) (National Health Service) Amendment Regulations 1991 SI 1991/2419
- Export and Investment Guarantees Act 1991 (Commencement) Order 1991 SI 1991/2430
- Control of Substances Hazardous to Health (Amendment) Regulations 1991 SI 1991/2431
- (A6) London–Carlisle Trunk Road and the (A46) Bath–Lincoln Trunk Road (Leicester Western Bypass) (Detrunking) Order 1991 SI 1991/2432
- (M1) London–Yorkshire Motorway (A46 Leicester Western Bypass) Connecting Roads (Supplementary) Scheme 1991 SI 1991/2433
- (A46) Bath–Lincoln Trunk Road (Leicester Western Bypass and Slip Roads) (Supplementary) Order 1991 SI 1991/2434
- (A46) Bath–Lincoln Trunk Road (Leicester Western Bypass and Slip Roads) Order 1991 SI 1991/2435
- Rules of the Air Regulations 1991 SI 1991/2437
- Local Government Act 1988 (Defined Activities) (Exemption) (England) (No.2) Order 1991 SI 1991/2438
- Social Fund Cold Weather Payments (General) Amendment No. 3 Regulations 1991 SI 1991/2448
- Fees for Cinema Licences (Variation) Order 1991 SI 1991/2462
- South Staffordshire Waterworks Company (Constitution and Regulation) Order 1991 SI 1991/2463
- Derbyshire and Greater Manchester (County Boundaries) Order 1991 SI 1991/2464
- National Health Service (Optical Charges and Payments) Amendment (No. 2) Regulations 1991 SI 1991/2465
- Local Government Superannuation (Interchange) Regulations 1991 SI 1991/2471
- Blood Tests (Evidence of Paternity) (Amendment) (No. 3) Regulations 1991 SI 1991/2472
- Food Protection (Emergency Prohibitions) (Paralytic Shellfish Poisoning) (No.12 Partial Revocation) Order 1991 SI 1991/2482
- Act of Sederunt (Rules of the Court of Session Amendment No.10) (Miscellaneous) 1991 SI 1991/2483
- Police (Amendment) Regulations 1991 SI 1991/2484
- Imported Food and Feedingstuffs (Safeguards against Cholera) Regulations 1991 SI 1991/2486
- National Health Service (Optical Charges and Payments) (Scotland) Amendment (No.2) Regulations 1991 SI 1991/2487
- Criminal Procedure (Insanity and Unfitness to Plead) Act 1991 (Commencement) Order 1991 SI 1991/2488
- Electricity (Non-Fossil Fuel Sources) (England and Wales) Order 1991 SI 1991/2490
- Motor Vehicles (Driving Licences) (Heavy Goods and Public Service Vehicles) (Amendment) Regulations 1991 SI 1991/2491
- Motor Vehicles (Driving Licences) (Large Goods and Passenger-Carrying Vehicles) (Amendment) (No. 4) Regulations 1991 SI 1991/2492
- Motor Vehicles (Driving Licences) (Amendment) (No. 3) Regulations 1991 SI 1991/2493
- Hampshire and Surrey (County Boundaries) Order 1991 SI 1991/2494
- Betting, Gaming and Lotteries Act 1963 (Variation of Fees) (Scotland) Order 1991 SI 1991/2495
- Betting, Gaming and Lotteries Act 1963 (Variation of Fees) (Scotland) (No.2) Order 1991 SI 1991/2496
- Amusements with Prizes (Variation of Fees) (Scotland) Order 1991 SI 1991/2497
- Lotteries (Registration Authority Fees) (Scotland) Order 1991 SI 1991/2498
- Gaming Act (Variation of Fees) (Scotland) (No.2) Order 1991 SI 1991/2499
- Children and Young Persons (Protection from Tobacco) Act 1991 (Commencement No. 1) Order 1991 SI 1991/2500

== 2501–2600 ==
- Combined Probation Areas (Devon) Order 1991 SI 1991/2501
- Residential Care Homes (Amendment) Regulations 1991 SI 1991/2502
- Value Added Tax (Special Provisions) (Amendment) Order 1991 SI 1991/2503
- The South Bucks (Parishes) Order 1991 S.I. 1991/2504
- Social Security (Contributions) Amendment (No. 6) Regulations 1991 SI 1991/2505
- Croydon Community National Health Service Trust (Transfer of Trust Property) Order 1991 SI 1991/2507
- Coal Mining Subsidence Act 1991 (Commencement) Order 1991 SI 1991/2508
- Coal Mining Subsidence (Notices and Claims) Regulations 1991 SI 1991/2509
- Coal Mining Subsidence (Preventive Measures and Rates of Interest) Order 1991 SI 1991/2510
- Insurance Companies (Linked Contracts) (Amendment) Regulations 1991 SI 1991/2511
- Ancient Monuments (Claims for Compensation) (England) Regulations 1991 SI 1991/2512
- Collieston Harbour Revision Order 1991 SI 1991/2513
- Local Government Superannuation (Miscellaneous Provisions) Regulations 1991 SI 1991/2522
- Import and Export (Plant Health Fees) (Forestry) (Great Britain) (Amendment) Order 1991 SI 1991/2523
- Mining Industry Act 1926 (Metrication) Regulations 1991 SI 1991/2531
- Nursing Homes and Mental Nursing Homes (Amendment) Regulations 1991 SI 1991/2532
- Value Added Tax (Piped Gas) (Metrication) Order 1991 SI 1991/2534
- Value Added Tax (Small Non-Commercial Consignments) Relief (Amendment) Order 1991 SI 1991/2535
- Control of Pollution (Radioactive Waste) (Scotland) Regulations 1991 SI 1991/2539
- Antioxidants in Food (Amendment) Regulations 1991 SI 1991/2540
- Lifecare National Health Service Trust (Transfer of Trust Property) Order 1991 SI 1991/2541
- Neath–Abergavenny Trunk Road (A465) (Improvement from Aberdulais to Glynneath and Slip Roads) Order 1991 SI 1991/2542
- Merchant Shipping (Load Lines) Act 1967 (Unregistered Ships) Order 1991 SI 1991/2543
- Local Government Act 1988 (Defined Activities) (Competition and Specified Periods) (Scotland) Amendment Regulations 1991 SI 1991/2548
- A2 Trunk Road (Old Dover Road, Barham) Detrunking Order 1991 SI 1991/2550
- A435 Trunk Road (Norton–Lenchwick Bypass) Order 1991 SI 1991/2551
- A435 Trunk Road (South of Norton to Arrow) De-Trunking Order 1991 SI 1991/2552
- A422 Trunk Road (South of Alcester) De-Trunking Order 1991 SI 1991/2553
- Bolton, Bury and Salford (District Boundaries) Order 1991 SI 1991/2555
- Education (National Curriculum) (Attainment Targets and Programmes of Study in Geography) (England) (No. 2) Order 1991 SI 1991/2562
- Education (National Curriculum) (Attainment Targets and Programmes of Study in Modern Foreign Languages) Order 1991 SI 1991/2563
- Spirits Regulations 1991 SI 1991/2564
- Sea Fishing (Specified Western Waters) (Restrictions on Landing) (Variation) Order 1991 SI 1991/2565
- Insurance Brokers Registration Council (Registration and Enrolment) (Amendment) Rules Approval Order 1991 SI 1991/2566
- Education (National Curriculum) (Modern Foreign Languages) Order 1991 SI 1991/2567
- Medicines (Veterinary Drugs) (Prescription Only) (Amendment) Order 1991 SI 1991/2568
- Value Added Tax (Buildings and Land) Order 1991 SI 1991/2569
- Electrical Equipment for Explosive Atmospheres (Certification) (Amendment) Regualtions 1991 SI 1991/2570
- International Carriage of Perishable Foodstuffs (Amendment) (No. 3) Regulations 1991 SI 1991/2571
- Water Byelaws (Milngavie Waterworks, Loch Katrine, Loch Arklet, Glen Finglas) Extension Order 1991 SI 1991/2573
- The Derbyshire Dales (Parishes) Order 1991 S.I. 1991/2574
- The Doncaster (Parishes) Order 1991 S.I. 1991/2575
- Electricity (Scottish Electricity Companies) (Target Investment Limits) Order 1991 SI 1991/2579
- Building Societies (Liquid Asset) Regulations 1991 SI 1991/2580
- Building Societies (Designation of Qualifying Bodies) (No.2) Order 1991 SI 1991/2581
- Building Societies (Prescribed Contracts) (Amendment) Order 1991 SI 1991/2582
- Customs Duties (ECSC) (Amendment No. 6) Order 1991 SI 1991/2583
- The Macclesfield (Parishes) Order 1991 S.I. 1991/2588
- Hartlepool (Parishes) Order 1991 SI 1991/2587
- Education (Bursaries for Teacher Training) (Amendment) (No. 2) Regulations 1991 SI 1991/2589
- The Pendle (Parishes) Order 1991 S.I. 1991/2590
- Dog Racecourse Totalisator (Percentage) Order 1991 SI 1991/2592
- Cod and Sole (Specified Sea Areas) (Prohibition of Fishing) (Variation) Order 1991 SI 1991/2593
- Folkestone-Honiton Trunk Road (A27 Brighton By-Pass and Slip Roads) Order 1984, Variation Order 1991 SI 1991/2594
- The Mid Devon (Parishes) Order 1991 S.I. 1991/2600

== 2601–2700 ==
- Income Tax (Interest Relief) (Qualifying Lenders) (No. 2) Order 1991 SI 1991/2604
- Medicines (Pharmacies) (Applications for Registration and Fees) Amendment Regulations 1991 SI 1991/2605
- Occupational Pensions (Revaluation) Order 1991 SI 1991/2606
- Act of Sederunt (Access to Health Records Rules) 1991 SI 1991/2607
- Education (National Curriculum) (Attainment Targets and Programmes of Study in Geography) (Wales) (Amendment) Order 1991 SI 1991/2608
- Sealink (Transfer of Portsmouth Harbour Railway Jetty) Harbour Revision Order 1991 SI 1991/2609
- Disability Living Allowance And Disability Working Allowance Act 1991 (Commencement No. 2) Order 1991 SI 1991/2617
- Public Lending Right Scheme 1982 (Commencement of Variations) Order 1991 SI 1991/2618
- Chester-Bangor Trunk Road (A55) (Aber Improvement and Slip Roads) Order 1991 SI 1991/2622
- Local Authorities (Armorial Bearings) Order 1991 SI 1991/2623
- Child Abduction and Custody (Parties to Conventions) (Amendment) (No. 3) Order 1991 SI 1991/2624
- Arms Control and Disarmament (Inspections) Act 1991 (Guernsey) Order 1991 SI 1991/2625
- Arms Control and Disarmament (Inspections) Act 1991 (Isle of Man) Order 1991 SI 1991/2626
- Arms Control and Disarmament (Inspections) Act 1991 (Jersey) Order 1991 SI 1991/2627
- Child Support(Northern Ireland) Order 1991 SI 1991/2628
- Consular Fees (Amendment) (No.3) Order 1991 SI 1991/2629
- Immigration (Isle of Man) Order 1991 SI 1991/2630
- Judicial Pensions (Northern Ireland) Order 1991 SI 1991/2631
- Suckler Cow Premium Regulations 1991 SI 1991/2632
- Natural Heritage (Scotland) Act 1991 (Commencement No. 2) Order 1991 SI 1991/2633
- Land Registration (District Registries) Order 1991 SI 1991/2634
- Agriculture Act 1986 (Commencement No. 5) Order 1991 SI 1991/2635
- Dangerous Dogs Compensation and Exemption Schemes (Amendment) (No. 2) Order 1991 SI 1991/2636
- Petty Sessional Divisions (Leicestershire) Order 1991 SI 1991/2637
- Conservation of Seals (Common Seals) (Shetland Islands Area) Order 1991 SI 1991/2638
- Central Regional Council (Gartmorn Reservoir) Byelaws Extension Order 1991 SI 1991/2639
- Goods Vehicles (Authorisation of International Journeys) (Fees) (Amendment) Regulations 1991 SI 1991/2646
- Ancient Monuments (Claims for Compensation) (Wales) Regulations 1991 SI 1991/2647
- Merger Reference (Medicopharma NV and AAH Holdings plc) Order 1991 SI 1991/2648
- Prevention of Terrorism (Temporary Provisions) (Designated Ports) Order 1991 SI 1991/2649
- Police (Amendment) (No. 2) Regulations 1991 SI 1991/2650
- North Yorkshire and West Yorkshire (County and District Boundaries) Order 1991 SI 1991/2651
- Act of Sederunt (Rules of the Court of Session Amendment No.11) (Applications under the Access to Health Records Act 1990) 1991 SI 1991/2652
- The Royal Borough of Windsor and Maidenhead (Parishes) Order 1991 S.I. 1991/2660
- The South Somerset (Parishes) Order 1991 S.I. 1991/2661
- The West Lindsey (Parishes) Order 1991 S.I. 1991/2662
- Export of Goods (Control) Order 1991 SI 1991/2666
- Magistrates' Courts (Remands in Custody) Order 1991 SI 1991/2667
- Rainhill Stoops to Queensway Trunk Road (A568 Widnes Eastern Bypass Southern Extension) Order 1991 SI 1991/2668
- Offshore Installations (Safety Zones) (No. 4) Order 1991 SI 1991/2669
- Rules of the Supreme Court (Amendment No. 4) 1991 SI 1991/2671
- Act of Adjournal (Consolidation Amendment No.3) 1991 SI 1991/2676
- Act of Adjournal (Consolidation Amendment No. 4) (Supervised Attendance Orders) 1991 SI 1991/2677
- Capital Gains Tax (Gilt-edged Securities) Order 1991 SI 1991/2678
- Public Supply Contracts Regulations 1991 SI 1991/2679
- Public Works Contracts Regulations 1991 SI 1991/2680
- Motor Vehicles (Type Approval) (Amendment) (No. 2) Regulations 1991 SI 1991/2681
- Saundersfoot Steam Railway (Light Railway) Order 1991 (SI 1991/2682)
- Administration of Justice Act 1985 (Commencement No. 7) Order 1991 SI 1991/2683
- Solicitors' Incorporated Practices Order 1991 SI 1991/2684
- Housing (Change of Landlord) (Payment of Disposal Cost by Instalments) (Amendment) (No.2) Regulations 1991 SI 1991/2685
- Police and Criminal Evidence Act 1984 (Commencement No. 4) Order 1991 SI 1991/2686
- Police and Criminal Evidence Act 1984 (Tape-recording of Interviews) (No. 1) Order 1991 SI 1991/2687
- Petty Sessional Divisions (Norfolk) Order 1991 SI 1991/2689
- Heating Appliances (Fireguards) (Safety) Regulations 1991 SI 1991/2693
- Goods Vehicles (Authorisation of International Journeys) (Fees) (Amendment) (No. 2) Regulations 1991 SI 1991/2694
- Income-related Benefits Schemes (Miscellaneous Provisions) Amendment Regulations 1991 SI 1991/2695
- Goods Vehicles (Operators' Licences)(Temporary Use in Great Britain) (Amendment) Regulations 1991 SI 1991/2696
- Pembrokeshire National Health Service Trust (Establishment) Order 1991 SI 1991/2697
- Planning (Consequential Provisions) Act 1990 (Appointed Day No. 1 and Transitional Provisions) Order 1991 SI 1991/2698
- Tribunals and Inquiries (Specified Tribunals) Order 1991 SI 1991/2699
- Gloucestershire Districts (Electoral Arrangements) (Variation) Order 1991 SI 1991/2700

== 2701–2800 ==
- Mid Devon, Torridge and West Devon (District Boundaries) Order 1991 SI 1991/2701
- Merger Reference (Medicopharma NV and AAH Holdings plc) (Amendment) Order 1991 SI 1991/2702
- Bank Accounts Directive (Miscellaneous Banks) Regulations 1991 SI 1991/2704
- Companies Act 1985 (Bank Accounts) Regulations 1991 SI 1991/2705
- Criminal Justice Act 1991 (Commencement No. 2 and Transitional Provisions) Order 1991 SI 1991/2706
- Social Security (Graduated Retirement Benefit) Amendment Regulations 1991 SI 1991/2707
- Disabled Persons (Badges for Motor Vehicles) (Amendment) Regulations 1991 SI 1991/2708
- Local Authorities' Traffic Orders (Exemptions for Disabled Persons) (England and Wales) (Amendment) Regulations 1991 SI 1991/2709
- Road Vehicles (Construction and Use) (Amendment) (No. 5) Regulations 1991 SI 1991/2710
- Local Government Act 1988 (Competition) (Leeds City Council) (Refuse Collection) Regulations 1991 SI 1991/2711
- Library Charges (England and Wales) Regulations 1991 SI 1991/2712
- A6 London–Inverness Trunk Road (Rothwell Interchange) Detrunking Order 1991 SI 1991/2713
- Local Authorities' Traffic Orders (Exemptions for Disabled Persons) (Scotland) Regulations 1991 SI 1991/2714
- Armed Forces Act 1991 (Commencement No.1) SI 1991/2719
- Armed Forces (Compensation Limits) Order 1991 SI 1991/2720
- British Technology Group Act 1991 (Appointed Day) Order 1991 SI 1991/2721
- British Technology Group Act 1991 (Nominated Company) Order 1991 SI 1991/2722
- A428 Trunk Road (Bedford Southern Bypass) Order 1991 SI 1991/2723
- Customs Controls on Importation of Goods Regulations 1991 SI 1991/2724
- Customs Warehousing Regulations 1991 SI 1991/2725
- Customs Warehousing (Victualling) Regulations 1991 SI 1991/2726
- Free Zone Regulations 1991 SI 1991/2727
- Planning and Compensation Act 1991 (Commencement No. 4 and Transitional Provisions) Order 1991 SI 1991/2728
- Partnerships (Unrestricted Size) No. 8 Regulations 1991 SI 1991/2729
- Courts and Legal Services Act 1990 (Commencement No. 7) Order 1991 SI 1991/2730
- Judicial Pensions (Widowers' and Children's Benefits) Regulations 1991 SI 1991/2731
- Acquisition of Land (Rate of Interest after Entry) Regulations 1991 SI 1991/2732
- Acquisition of Land (Rate of Interest after Entry) (Scotland) Regulations 1991 SI 1991/2733
- Banking Act 1987 (Exempt Persons) Order 1991 SI 1991/2734
- Town and Country Planning (Fees for Applications and Deemed Applications) (Amendment) Regulations 1991 SI 1991/2735
- Insurance Companies (Accounts and Statements) (Amendment) Regulations 1991 SI 1991/2736
- Naval Courts-Martial General Orders (Royal Navy) 1991 SI 1991/2737
- Building Societies Act 1986 (Modifications) (No. 2) Order 1991 SI 1991/2738
- Civil Aviation (Route Charges for Navigation Services) (Third Amendment) Regulations 1991 SI 1991/2739
- Social Security (Attendance Allowance) Regulations 1991 SI 1991/2740
- Social Security (Claims and Payments) Amendment Regulations 1991 SI 1991/2741
- Disability Living Allowance and Disability Working Allowance (Consequential Provisions) Regulations 1991 SI 1991/2742
- Protection of Wrecks (Designation No. 2) Order 1991 SI 1991/2746
- Electrically, Hydraulically and Oil-Electrically Operated Lifts (Components) (EEC Requirements) Regulations 1991 SI 1991/2748
- Simple Pressure Vessels (Safety) Regulations 1991 SI 1991/2749
- Stansted Airport London (Cargo Area Designation) Order 1991 SI 1991/2750
- Town and Country Planning (Fees for Applications and Deemed Applications) (Scotland) Amendment Regulations 1991 SI 1991/2765
- Food Protection (Emergency Prohibitions) (Radioactivity in Sheep) Partial Revocation Order 1991 SI 1991/2766
- Haddock (Specified Sea Areas) (Prohibition of Fishing) Order 1991 SI 1991/2767
- Building Regulations 1991 SI 1991/2768
- Petty Sessional Divisions (Avon) Order 1991 SI 1991/2769
- Hearing Aid Council Investigating and Disciplinary Committee Rules Approval Instrument 1991 SI 1991/2770
- A13 Trunk Road (Movers Lane Flyover, Barking and Dagenham) (Weight Restriction) Order 1991 SI 1991/2771
- Social Security (Credits) Amendment Regulations 1991 SI 1991/2772
- Waltham Forest Housing Action Trust (Area and Constitution) Order 1991 SI 1991/2773
- Personal Equity Plan (Amendment No. 2) Regulations 1991 SI 1991/2774
- Housing Revenue Account General Fund Contribution Limits (Scotland) Order 1991 SI 1991/2775
- Food Protection (Emergency Prohibitions) (Radioactivity in Sheep) (England) (Partial Revocation) Order 1991 SI 1991/2776
- Education (London Residuary Body) (Property Transfer) (No. 4) Order 1991 SI 1991/2778
- Provision of Confidential Statistical Informationto the Statistical Office of the European Communities (Restriction on Disclosure) Regulations 1991 SI 1991/2779
- Food Protection (Emergency Prohibitions) (Radioactivity in Sheep) (Wales) (Partial Revocation) Order 1991 SI 1991/2780
- Non-Domestic Rating Contributions (Wales) (Amendment) Regulations 1991 SI 1991/2781
- Local Government Act 1988 (Defined Activities) (Competition) (England) (Amendment) (No. 2) Regulations 1991 SI 1991/2782
- Local Government Act 1988 (Defined Activities) (Exemptions) (England) (No. 3) Order 1991 SI 1991/2783
- Civil Legal Aid (General) (Amendment) (No. 3) Regulations 1991 SI 1991/2784
- Rules of Procedure (Air Force) (Amendment) Rules 1991 SI 1991/2786
- Rules of Procedure (Army) (Amendment) Rules 1991 SI 1991/2787
- Standing Civilian Courts (Areas) (Amendment) Order 1991 SI 1991/2788
- A406 London North Circular Trunk Road (A1 Great North Way/Falloden Way, A598 Regents Park Road/Finchley Road Junctions Improvements) Trunk Roads and Slip Roads Order 1991 SI 1991/2789
- Private Water Supplies Regulations 1991 SI 1991/2790
- Motor Vehicles (Tests) (Amendment)(No. 5) Regulations 1991 SI 1991/2791
- Civil Aviation (Joint Financing) (Third Amendment) Regulations 1991 SI 1991/2792
- Non-Domestic Rating Contributions (England) (Amendment) Regulations 1991 SI 1991/2793
- Town and Country Planning (Development Plan) Regulations 1991 SI 1991/2794

== 2801–2900 ==
- Town and Country Planning (Enforcement Notices and Appeals) Regulations 1991 SI 1991/2804
- Town and Country Planning General Development (Amendment) (No. 3) Order 1991 SI 1991/2805
- Sole (Specified Sea Areas) (Prohibition of Fishing) Order 1991 SI 1991/2806
- Personal Community Charge (Reduction Scheme) (England) Regulations 1991 SI 1991/2807
- Income Tax (Purchased Life Annuities) (Amendment) Regulations 1991 SI 1991/2808
- Peak Rail Light Railway Order 1991 (SI 1991/2812)
- Sex Discrimination Act 1975 (Exemption of Special Treatment for Lone Parents) Order 1991 SI 1991/2813
- Anthrax Order 1991 SI 1991/2814
- Domestic Property (Valuation) (Amendment) Regulations 1991 SI 1991/2815
- Marriage Fees (Scotland) Regulations 1991 SI 1991/2816
- Registration of Births, Deaths, Marriages and Divorces (Fees) (Scotland) Regulations 1991 SI 1991/2817
- Registration of Births, Deaths and Marriages (Fees) (Scotland) Order 1991 SI 1991/2818
- Western Isles Islands Council (Hushinish) Water Order 1991 SI 1991/2819
- Western Isles Islands Council (Govig) Water Order 1991 SI 1991/2820
- Lancashire County Council (New Shard Bridge) Scheme 1988 Confirmation Instrument 1991 SI 1991/2823
- Fertilisers (Sampling and Analysis) (Amendment) Regulations 1991 SI 1991/2824
- Food Premises (Registration) Regulations 1991 SI 1991/2825
- Electrical Equipment for Explosive Atmospheres (Certification) (Amendment) (No. 2) Regulations 1991 SI 1991/2826
- The Northavon (Parishes) Order 1991 S.I. 1991/2827
- Scottish Seed Potato Development Council (Amendment) Order 1991 SI 1991/2828
- Environmental Protection Act 1990 (Commencement No. 10) Order 1991 SI 1991/2829
- Motor Vehicles (Type Approval) (Amendment) (No. 3) Regulations 1991 SI 1991/2830
- Registered Foreign Lawyers Order 1991 SI 1991/2831
- A1 Trunk Road (Islington) Red Route Experimental Traffic (Amendment) (No.2) Order 1991 SI 1991/2838
- Environmental Protection (Duty of Care) Regulations 1991 SI 1991/2839
- Feeding Stuffs Regulations 1991 SI 1991/2840
- Animals, Meat and Meat Products (Examination for Residues and Maximum limits) Regulations 1991 SI 1991/2843
- Consumer Credit (Exempt Agreements) (Amendment) (No. 3) Order 1991 SI 1991/2844
- Education (School Government) (Amendment) Regulations SI 1991/2845
- Mackerel (Specified Sea Areas) (Prohibition of Fishing) Order 1991 SI 1991/2849
- British Railways (Penalty Fares) Act 1989 (Activating No. 2) Order 1991 SI 1991/2853
- A50 and A453 Trunk Roads (Flagstaff Interchange and Link Road) Detrunking Order 1991 SI 1991/2859
- Finance Act 1990, section 46, (Appointed Day) Order 1991 SI 1991/2860
- Law Reform (Miscellaneous Provisions) (Scotland) Act 1990 (Commencement No. 9) Order 1991 SI 1991/2862
- Saithe (Specified Sea Areas) (Prohibition of Fishing) Order 1991 SI 1991/2863
- Broadcasting (Programme Contractors' Additional Payments) Order 1991 SI 1991/2868
- Police (Amendment) (No. 3) Regulations 1991 SI 1991/2869
- Child Abduction and Custody (Parties to Conventions) (Amendment) (No. 4) Order 1991 SI 1991/2870
- Virgin Islands (Constitution) (Amendment) Order 1991 SI 1991/2871
- Children and Young Persons (Protection from Tobacco) (Northern Ireland) Order 1991 SI 1991/2872
- Criminal Justice Act 1988 (Designated Countries and Territories) Order 1991 SI 1991/2873
- Disability Living Allowance and Disability Working Allowance (Northern Ireland Consequential Amendments) Order 1991 SI 1991/2874
- Merchant Shipping Act 1988 (Guernsey) Order 1991 SI 1991/2875
- Double Taxation Relief (Taxes on Income) (Czechoslovakia) Order 1991 SI 1991/2876
- Double Taxation Relief (Taxes on Income) (Denmark) Order 1991 SI 1991/2877
- Double Taxation Relief (Taxes on Income) (Finland) Order 1991 SI 1991/2878
- Double Taxation Relief (Taxes on Income) (Iceland) Order 1991 SI 1991/2879
- Double Taxation Relief (Taxes on Income) (Isle of Man) Order 1991 SI 1991/2880
- Double Taxation Relief (Taxes on Income) (Morocco) Order 1991 SI 1991/2881
- Double Taxation Relief (Taxes on Income) (Papua New Guinea) Order 1991 SI 1991/2882
- Criminal Procedure (Scotland) Act 1975 (Commencement No. 1) Order 1991 SI 1991/2883
- Maximum Number of Judges (Scotland) Order 1991 SI 1991/2884
- Merchant Shipping (Prevention of Oil Pollution) (Amendment) Order 1991 SI 1991/2885
- Ministerial and other Salaries Order 1991 SI 1991/2886
- Disability Working Allowance (General) Regulations 1991 SI 1991/2887
- Guaranteed Minimum Pensions Increase (No.2) Order 1991 SI 1991/2888
- Social Security (Adjudication) Amendment (No. 3) Regulations 1991 SI 1991/2889
- Social Security (Disability Living Allowance) Regulations 1991 SI 1991/2890
- Social Security (Introduction of Disability Living Allowance) Regulations 1991 SI 1991/2891
- Smoke Control Areas (Exempted Fireplaces) Order 1991 SI 1991/2892
- A1 Trunk Road (Brownieside De-Trunking) Order 1991 SI 1991/2893
- A1 Trunk Road (Brownieside Improvement) Order 1991 SI 1991/2894
- Domestic Property (Valuation) (Scotland) Amendment Regulations 1991 SI 1991/2895
- Education (National Curriculum) (Attainment Targets and Programmes of Study in Mathematics) Order 1991 SI 1991/2896
- Education (National Curriculum) (Attainment Targets and Programmes of Study in Science) Order 1991 SI 1991/2897
- South Ayrshire Hospitals National Health Service Trust (Establishment) Order 1991 SI 1991/2898
- Foresterhill Hospitals National Health Service Trust (Establishment) Order 1991 SI 1991/2899
- Milk and Dairies and Milk (Special Designation) (Charges) (Amendment) Regulations 1991 SI 1991/2900

== 2901–3000 ==
- Food Protection (Emergency Prohibitions) (Paralytic Shellfish Poisoning) (No. 13) Order 1991 SI 1991/2901
- Food Protection (Emergency Prohibitions) (Paralytic Shellfish Poisoning) (No. 14) Order 1991 SI 1991/2902
- Planning and Compensation Act 1991 (Commencement No. 5 and Transitional Provisions) Order 1991 SI 1991/2905
- Non-Domestic Rating (Ports of London and Tilbury) Regulations 1991 SI 1991/2906
- Nurses, Midwives and Health Visitors (Registered Fever Nurses and Nurses with Ortopaedic and Ophthalmic Qualifications) Amendment Rules Approval Order 1991 SI 1991/2907
- Tees and Hartlepool Port Authority Scheme 1991 Confirmation Order 1991 SI 1991/2908
- Social Security (Contributions) (Re-rating) (No. 2) Order 1991 SI 1991/2909
- Social Security Benefits Up-rating (No. 2) Order 1991 SI 1991/2910
- Statutory Sick Pay (Rate of Payment) (No. 2) Order 1991 SI 1991/2911
- Wrexham and East Denbighshire Water Order 1991 SI 1991/2912
- Milford Port Health Authority Order 1991 SI 1991/2913
- Petty Sessional Divisions (Staffordshire) Order 1991 SI 1991/2914
- Combined Probation Areas (Staffordshire) Order 1991 SI 1991/2915
- Combined Probation Areas (Cheshire) Order 1991 SI 1991/2916
- Combined Probation Areas (Cambridgeshire) Order 1991 SI 1991/2917
- Combined Probation Areas (Avon) Order 1991 SI 1991/2918
- Combined Probation Areas (Norfolk) Order 1991 SI 1991/2919
- Teachers (Education, Training and Registration) (Scotland) Amendment Regulations 1991 SI 1991/2921
- Nature Conservancy Council (Dissolution) Order 1991 SI 1991/2923
- Non-Domestic Rating (Appropriate Fraction and Rateable Values) Order 1991 SI 1991/2924
- Customs Duties (ECSC) (Quota and other Reliefs) Order 1991 SI 1991/2925
- Rochdale Healthcare National Service Trust (Establishment) Order 1991 SI 1991/2926
- Imported Food and Feedingstuffs (Safeguards against Cholera) (Amendment) Regulations 1991 SI 1991/2934
- Tayside Regional Council (Allt Girnaig, Moulin) (Amendment) Water Order 1991 SI 1991/2939
- Local Government and Housing Act 1989 (Commencement No. 13) Order 1991 SI 1991/2940
- Education Support Grants (Amendment) Regulations 1991 SI 1991/2943
- Teachers' Pay and Conditions Act 1987 (Continuation) Order 1991 SI 1991/2944
- Companies Act 1989 (Commencement No. 14 and Transitional Provision) Order 1991 SI 1991/2945

== See also ==
- List of statutory instruments of the United Kingdom
