= Holton-le-Clay railway station =

Former railway station in Lincolnshire, England

Coordinates: 53.4938°N 0.0519°W

Holton-le-Clay
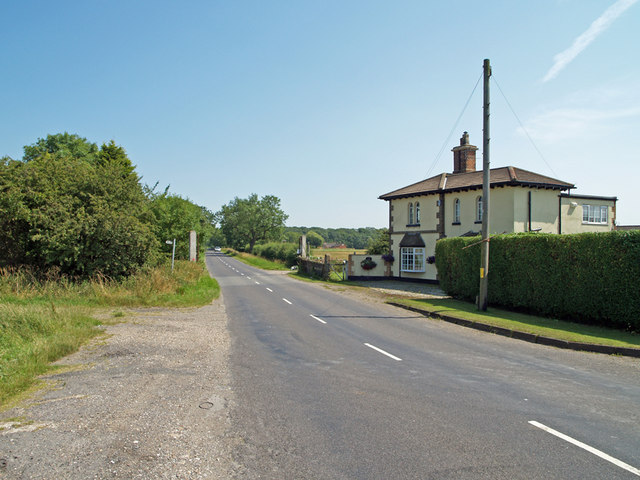
- Stationhouse in 2008.

General information
- Location: Holton-le-Clay, East Lindsey; England
- Platforms: 2

Other information
- Status: Disused

History
- Original company: East Lincolnshire Railway
- Pre-grouping: Great Northern Railway
- Post-grouping: London and North Eastern Railway; Eastern Region of British Railways

Key dates
- 1 March 1848: Opened as Holton-le-Clay and Tetney
- ?: Renamed
- 4 July 1955: Closed to passengers
- 25 May 1964: Goods facilities withdrawn
- December 1980: Closure of line
Location

Holton-le-Clay was a railway station on the East Lincolnshire Railway which served the English villages of Holton-le-Clay and Tetney in Lincolnshire between 1848 and 1964. It was originally named Holton-le-Clay and Tetney, but Tetney was dropped soon after opening, even though the station was more conveniently sited for that village. The line through Holton-le-Clay remained open for freight until December 1980, but could be reopened by the Lincolnshire Wolds Railway as its northern terminus.

== History ==
The station opened on 1 March 1848 as part of the East Lincolnshire Railway between Grimsby and Louth. It was constructed by contractor John Waring and Sons of Rotherham who, in December 1846, had agreed to construct the line for the sum of £46,102 (equivalent to £4,650,000 in 2025). The architects of the station buildings were John Grey Weightman and Matthew Ellison Hadfield of Sheffield.

The station was initially named Holton-le-Clay and Tetney to reflect its location one mile to the south of the Lincolnshire village of Holton-le-Clay and slightly closer to Tetney to the east. It consisted of staggered platforms either side of the level crossing over the Tetney road; the down platform to the north and the up to the south. A signal box constructed in the standard East Lincolnshire Railway pattern stood on the north side of the crossing. It controlled the crossing and a small goods yard situated to the south of the crossing on the down side. The yard was served by a single siding which trailed off the down line to end in cattle dock. The station house, built in the same style as those provided at Fotherby Halt and Utterby Halt, stood in the north-eastern corner of the yard.

Although the station was more convenient for Tetney than Holton-le-Clay, Tetney was dropped from the station's name soon after opening. The July 1922 timetable saw nine up and down weekday services, plus one Sunday service each way, call at Holton-le-Clay. The station closed to passengers on 4 July 1955, with the goods yard remaining open a further nine years until 25 May 1964.

Historical railways
Holton Village Halt; Line and station closed	Great Northern Railway; East Lincolnshire Line	Grainsby Halt; Line and station open
Preceding station	Heritage railways	Following station
Planned extensions
Terminus	Lincolnshire Wolds Railway	North Thoresby towards Ludborough

== Present day ==
The platforms have been demolished, but the stationhouse remains in private ownership. The crossing gates on both sides have also survived, as has the cattle dock which stands in the yard now used as an industrial vehicle depot. The former Up Home signal no.17 still stands in front of the foundations of the signal box. On 28 September 1991, the Lincolnshire Wolds Railway obtained the Grimsby and Louth Light Railway Order 1991 (SI 1991/2210) authorising the reinstatement of the East Lincolnshire Railway between Waltham and the former Keddington Road level crossing near Louth, which would include the line up to Holton-le-Clay.

On 26 August 2009, the first train between North Thoresby and Ludborough ran for the first time in 47 years. It is planned to reopen the line as far north as Holton-le-Clay.

== Sources ==
- Butt, R. V. J. (October 1995). The Directory of Railway Stations: details every public and private passenger station, halt, platform and stopping place, past and present (1st ed.). Sparkford: Patrick Stephens Ltd. ISBN 978-1-85260-508-7. OCLC 60251199. OL 11956311M.
- Clinker, C.R. (October 1978). Clinker's Register of Closed Passenger Stations and Goods Depots in England, Scotland and Wales 1830-1977. Bristol: Avon-Anglia Publications & Services. ISBN 0-905466-19-5.
- Conolly, W. Philip (2004) [1958]. British Railways Pre-Grouping Atlas and Gazetteer. Hersham, Surrey: Ian Allan Ltd. ISBN 978-0-7110-0320-0.
- Goode, C.T. (1985). The Railways of North Lincolnshire. Anlaby, Hull: C.T. Goode. ISBN 978-0-9508239-7-3.
- King, P.K.; Hewins, D.R. (1998) [1989]. The Railways around Grimsby, Cleethorpes, Immingham & North-East Lincolnshire. Romiley, Stockport: Foxline Publishing. ISBN 978-1-870119-04-7.
- Ludlam, A.J. (1991). The East Lincolnshire Railway (OL82). Headington, Oxford: The Oakwood Press. ISBN 0-85361-416-4.
- Stennett, Alan (2007). Lost Railways of Lincolnshire. Newbury, Berkshire: Countryside Books. ISBN 978-1-84674-040-4.
