= Holton Village Halt railway station =

Former railway station in Lincolnshire, England

Coordinates: 53.5047°N 0.0561°W

Holton Village Halt
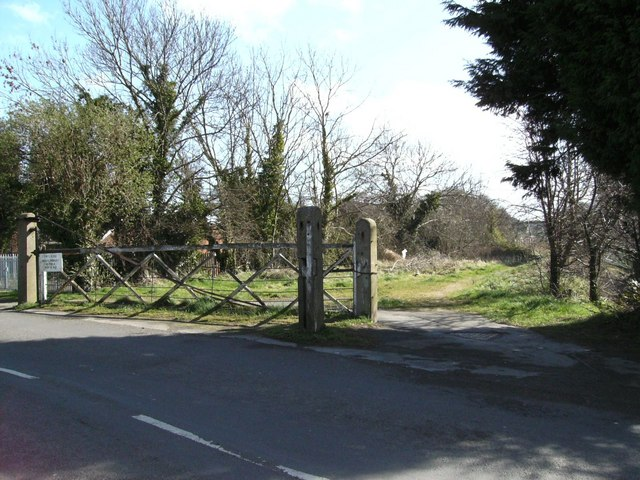

General information
- Location: Holton-le-Clay, East Lindsey; England
- Platforms: 2

Other information
- Status: Disused

History
- Original company: Great Northern Railway
- Post-grouping: London and North Eastern Railway; Eastern Region of British Railways

Key dates
- 11 December 1905: Opened
- 11 September 1961: Closed
- December 1980: Closure of line
Location

Holton Village Halt was a railway halt on the East Lincolnshire Railway which served the village of Holton-le-Clay in Lincolnshire between 1905 and 1961. The station, which opened as part of a new motor train service between Grimsby and Louth, was the second station to serve the village after Holton-le-Clay and Tetney situated further to the south. The line through Holton-le-Clay remained open for freight until December 1980.

== History ==
The station was opened on 11 December 1905 to coincide with the introduction of a motor train service by the Great Northern Railway. It was the second station opened on the East Lincolnshire Line to serve the village of Holton-le-Clay in Lincolnshire. Holton-le-Clay and Tetney had opened in 1848 but was over a mile to the south of the village and more convenient for Tetney to the east, whilst Holton Village Halt was in the village itself. The station had two low parallel railmotor platforms to the south of a level crossing over Tetney Lane, with a timber waiting shelter and lamp on each platform. A stationhouse was situated on the north side of the crossing. It was of more substantial construction than the other halts on the line, such as Grainsby Halt which was unlit and had only one passenger shelter.

Although the July 1922 timetable shows that passenger services only called at the station upon request, by August 1961 a total of seven trains from Grimsby called on weekdays, with an extra train running on Fridays. The station closed to passengers on 11 September 1961; it outlasted the earlier Holton-le-Clay station to the south by six years.

Preceding station	Disused railways	Following station
Waltham; Line and station closed	Great Northern Railway; East Lincolnshire Line	Holton-le-Clay; Line and station closed

== Present day ==
The halt was demolished by British Rail long before final closure of the line in December 1980 and little remains of it today. The level crossing gates to the south have survived and the stationhouse is in private occupation. The village of Holton-le-Clay has expanded over the fields which bordered the line, which has led one author to speculate that the East Lincolnshire Railway, if it had remained open, would have become a vital link between the village and Grimsby.

On 28 September 1991, the Grimsby and Louth Light Railway Order 1991 (SI 1991/2210) authorising the reinstatement of the East Lincolnshire Railway between Waltham and the former Keddington Road level crossing near Louth, which would include the line up to Holton-le-Clay station.

The Lincolnshire Wolds Railway plans to extend the line up to Holton-Le-Clay station. The former village halt has now been built over with a housing development and the track bed to the south re-developed.

== Sources ==
- Butt, R. V. J. (October 1995). The Directory of Railway Stations: details every public and private passenger station, halt, platform and stopping place, past and present (1st ed.). Sparkford: Patrick Stephens Ltd. ISBN 978-1-85260-508-7. OCLC 60251199. OL 11956311M.
- Clinker, C.R. (October 1978). Clinker's Register of Closed Passenger Stations and Goods Depots in England, Scotland and Wales 1830-1977. Bristol: Avon-Anglia Publications & Services. ISBN 0-905466-19-5.
- Conolly, W. Philip (2004) [1958]. British Railways Pre-Grouping Atlas and Gazetteer. Hersham, Surrey: Ian Allan Ltd. ISBN 978-0-7110-0320-0.
- Goode, C.T. (1985). The Railways of North Lincolnshire. Anlaby, Hull: C.T. Goode. ISBN 978-0-9508239-7-3.
- King, P.K.; Hewins, D.R. (1998) [1989]. The Railways around Grimsby, Cleethorpes, Immingham & North-East Lincolnshire. Romiley, Stockport: Foxline Publishing. ISBN 978-1-870119-04-7.
- Ludlam, A.J. (1991). The East Lincolnshire Railway (OL82). Headington, Oxford: The Oakwood Press. ISBN 0-85361-416-4.
- Stennett, Alan (2007). Lost Railways of Lincolnshire. Newbury, Berkshire: Countryside Books. ISBN 978-1-84674-040-4.
