= Grainsby Halt railway station =

Former railway station in Lincolnshire, England

Coordinates: 53.4783°N 0.045045°W

Grainsby Halt
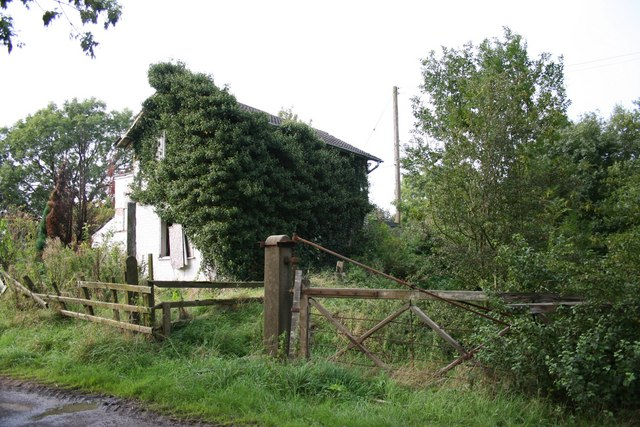
- Derelict stationhouse in 2006.

General information
- Location: Grainsby, East Lindsey; England
- Platforms: 2

Other information
- Status: Disused

History
- Original company: Great Northern Railway
- Post-grouping: London and North Eastern Railway; Eastern Region of British Railways

Key dates
- 11 December 1905: Opened
- 1939: Temporarily closed
- ?: Reopened
- 10 March 1952: Closed
- December 1980: Closure of line
Location

Grainsby Halt was a railway halt on the East Lincolnshire Railway which served the hamlet of Grainsby in Lincolnshire between 1905 and 1952. The station, which opened as part of a new motor train service between Grimsby and Louth, was opened to serve a Victorian hall situated 2 miles (3.2 km) to the west. The station, one of the smallest to be taken over by British Railways on nationalisation in 1947, never really justified its existence and closed in 1952 following a period of temporary closure during the Second World War. The line through Grainsby remained open for freight until December 1980.

== History ==
The station was opened on 11 December 1905 to coincide with the introduction of a motor train service by the Great Northern Railway. It consisted of two low facing halt platforms to the south of the level crossing over Grainsby Lane; a small single-storey timber waiting shelter was provided on the up platform. It was not provided with any lighting, which made it very difficult to find on a dark night. A crossing keeper's cottage lay to the north of the crossing. The cottage was similar in design to the cottage at Fotherby Halt. The station was opened to serve Grainsby Hall, a Victorian country house situated 2 miles (3.2 km) to the west. The house was occupied by the Haigh family, Halifax wool merchants who had inherited the estate in 1829. Once the home of George Henry Caton Haigh, the house stood empty for many years and was reputed to be haunted. It was demolished in 1972.

The station, at which trains only called upon request, closed as a temporary wartime measure in 1939. It still figured in timetables for October 1939, 1940 and 1941, but no trains were scheduled to call. The halt reopened after the war on an unknown date, when it was one of the smallest stations to be inherited by British Railways upon nationalisation in 1948. Grainsby Halt never really justified its existence and was closed permanently on 10 March 1952.

Preceding station	Heritage railways	Following station
Holton-le-Clay	Lincolnshire Wolds Railway (Future Extension)	North Thoresby
	Historical railways	
Holton-le-Clay; Line and station closed	Great Northern Railway; East Lincolnshire Line	North Thoresby; Line and station open

== Present day ==
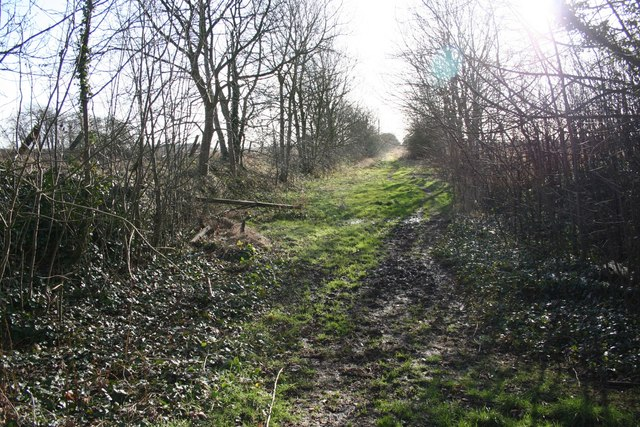
Station site in 2008.

Although the halt remained in a good condition almost ten years after closure, it was subsequently demolished by British Rail before final closure of the line in December 1980. Nothing remains of the halt, although the crossing keeper's cottage was still standing, in a derelict state, in 2006.

On 28 September 1991, the Lincolnshire Wolds Railway obtained the Grimsby and Louth Light Railway Order 1991 (SI 1991/2210) authorising the reinstatement of the East Lincolnshire Railway between Waltham and the former Keddington Road level crossing near Louth, which would include the section of line through Utterby.

On 26 August 2009, the first train between North Thoresby - the first station to the south from Grainsby - and Ludborough ran for the first time in 47 years. It is planned to reopen the line still further through Grainsby as far as Holton-Le-Clay.

== Future ==
The Lincolnshire Wolds Railway aims to eventually (when time and money permit) extend the line, northwards from North Thoresby, through to as far as Holton-le-Clay.

It is however very doubtful that Grainsby halt will ever be reinstated, as the LWR would concentrate on track extension to Holton-le-Clay, however, Grainsby would start off as the temporary limit of the line, before track extension would continue.

The adjacent Level crossing will almost certainly be an Automatic half barrier crossing instead of crossing gates that will be locally monitored by North Thoresby signal box.

The former crossing keeper's house that is standing in its original position to the north of the level crossing is in a dangerous condition and will almost certainly be demolished.

== Sources ==
- Butt, R. V. J. (October 1995). The Directory of Railway Stations: details every public and private passenger station, halt, platform and stopping place, past and present (1st ed.). Sparkford: Patrick Stephens Ltd. ISBN 978-1-85260-508-7. OCLC 60251199. OL 11956311M.
- Clinker, C.R. (October 1978). Clinker's Register of Closed Passenger Stations and Goods Depots in England, Scotland and Wales 1830-1977. Bristol: Avon-Anglia Publications & Services. ISBN 0-905466-19-5.
- Goode, C.T. (1985). The Railways of North Lincolnshire. Anlaby, Hull: C.T. Goode. ISBN 978-0-9508239-7-3.
- King, P.K.; Hewins, D.R. (1998) [1989]. The Railways around Grimsby, Cleethorpes, Immingham & North-East Lincolnshire. Romiley, Stockport: Foxline Publishing. ISBN 978-1-870119-04-7.
- Ludlam, A.J. (1991). The East Lincolnshire Railway (OL82). Headington, Oxford: The Oakwood Press. ISBN 0-85361-416-4.
- Conolly, W. Philip (2004) [1958]. British Railways Pre-Grouping Atlas and Gazetteer. Hersham, Surrey: Ian Allan Ltd. ISBN 978-0-7110-0320-0.
- Stennett, Alan (2007). Lost Railways of Lincolnshire. Newbury, Berkshire: Countryside Books. ISBN 978-1-84674-040-4.
- Thorold, Henry (1999). Lincolnshire Houses. Norwich: Michael Russell Publishing. ISBN 978-0-85955-254-7.
