= Ludborough railway station =

Heritage station in Lincolnshire, England

Ludborough
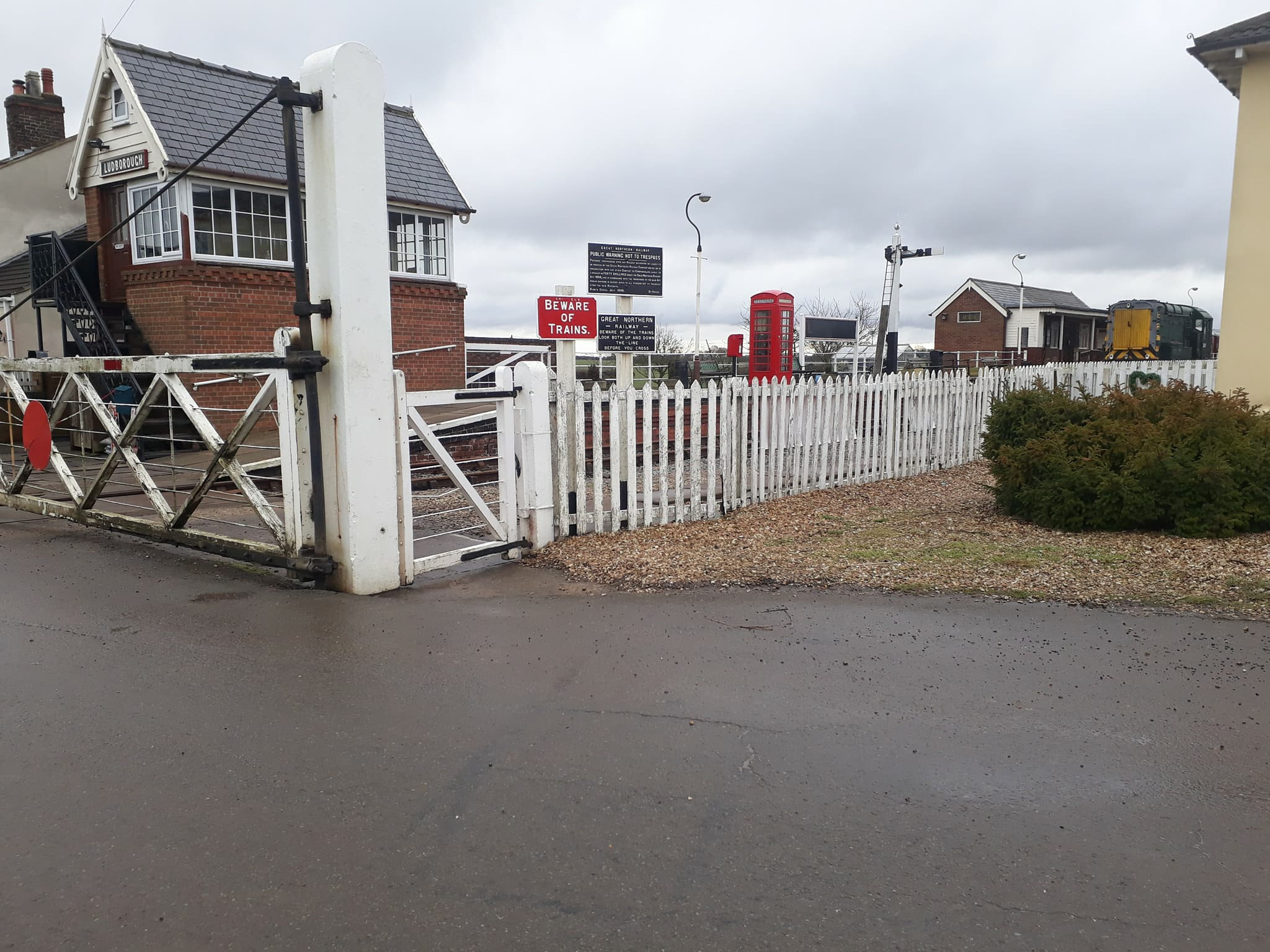
- Ludborough station site in 2018

General information
- Location: Ludborough, East Lindsey; England
- Coordinates: 53.4447°N 0.0311°W
- Grid reference: TF308960
- System: Station on heritage railway
- Operator: Great Northern & East Lincolnshire Railway plc Lincolnshire Wolds Railway
- Platforms: 3

History
- Original company: East Lincolnshire Railway
- Pre-grouping: Great Northern Railway
- Post-grouping: London and North Eastern Railway; Eastern Region of British Railways

Key dates
- 1 March 1848: Opened
- 11 September 1961: Closed to passengers
- 25 May 1964: Goods facilities withdrawn
- December 1980: Closure of line
- 1984: Preservation society take over site
- 1998: First trains run
- 26 August 2009: Opening to North Thoresby
Location

Ludborough is a heritage railway station in Ludborough, Lincolnshire, England, which is the base of the Lincolnshire Wolds Railway. The station, which was previously part of the East Lincolnshire Railway, closed in 1961 to passengers and 1964 to freight, but was taken over by the preservation society in 1984. The first trains from the station to North Thoresby, to the north, ran in August 2009, the first for 47 years. There are proposals to extend the line further in both directions towards Holton-le-Clay and Louth.

== History ==
The station was opened on 28 March 1848 and was originally named Ludborough for Fulstow although the for Fulstow was later dropped. Although its name is taken from the Lincolnshire village of Ludborough, the station is in fact situated halfway between that village and Fulstow. It was constructed by contractor John Waring and Sons of Rotherham who, in December 1846, had agreed to construct the line between Grimsby Town and Louth for the sum of £46,102 (equivalent to £4,650,000 in 2025). The architects of the station buildings were John Grey Weightman and Matthew Ellison Hadfield of Sheffield.

Ludborough, some 5 miles (8 km) from Louth, was provided with staggered platforms either side of a level crossing; the up platform to the south of the crossing and the up to the north. A third lower platform was later added in connection with the rail motor service introduced from 1905. Situated opposite the up platform, the rail motor platform is adjacent to a brick stationmaster's house which also comprised the booking office and passenger waiting room. The architectural style of the house and the station layout is similar to the stations at North Thoresby, Holton-le-Clay and Waltham.

A signal box on the up platform which contained a 20 lever frame controlled the crossing gates as well as access to the small goods yard with two sidings on the opposite side. Ludborough had the most comprehensive goods facilities on the line between Louth and Grimsby, having cattle pens and a large brick goods shed; one siding ran into a loading dock behind the down platform. The design of the shed is based on the warehouse built by the Louth Navigation at Austen Fen. The station closed to passengers on 11 September 1961, the same day as Fotherby Halt and Utterby Halt to the south and Holton-le-Clay and Waltham to the north. This made North Thoresby the only intermediate station open between Louth and Grimsby . It closed completely on 25 May 1964 when goods facilities were withdrawn.After the closure of the line to passengers in 1970, the down line was removed between Louth and Hainton Street leaving only the up line through Ludborough to remain open until December 1980.

Preceding station	Heritage railways	Following station
North Thoresby Terminus	Lincolnshire Wolds Railway	Terminus
Planned extensions
North Thoresby Terminus	Lincolnshire Wolds Railway	Fotherby Halt towards Louth North
Historical railways
North Thoresby; Line and station open	Great Northern Railway; East Lincolnshire Line	Utterby Halt; Line and station closed

== Preservation and reopening ==
In 1978, the Grimsby-Louth Rail Group was formed with the aim of reintroducing a service between Grimsby and Louth. They were unsuccessful in saving the line intact. After BR ripped up the track and destroyed all the buildings the group decided to rename themselves the Grimsby-Louth Railway preservation society. The society focussed their efforts into restoring the two sole remaining signalboxes on the line: Hainton street in Grimsby and Louth North. Both these boxes were left behind by BR as they had gate wheels in them which made it easier to operate the crossing gates for the last few years. Both the boxes suffered severe vandalism. In 1984, the Society took a lease from British Rail of Ludborough station site which became its base. A new company was formed with the intention of buying the remains of the track bed as BR would not sell to a society at that time. The new company was called the Great Northern and East Lincolnshire railway company plc. On 28 September 1991, the company Great Northern and East Lincolnshire Railway co plc obtained the Grimsby and Louth Light Railway Order 1991 (SI 1991/2210) authorising the reinstatement of the East Lincolnshire Railway between Waltham and the former Keddington Road level crossing near Louth, which would include the line through Ludborough. The signal box at Hainton street was destroyed by fire in the early 1990s. The frame and the gate wheel were removed and placed into storage at Ludborough ready for re-use. The frame is now in use as Ludborough's frame. The wheel is also in Ludborough box but will never be used in this location. Louth North was restored by the society but suffered continual vandalism. The box is a grade II listed structure and has been converted into a house but still retains its signal box look.

With the order in place, this allowed the company to acquire track, locos and rolling stock with the society supporting the company as much as it can. The company (now trading as the Lincolnshire Wolds Railway) have had to rebuild all of the station's facilities, including a replica Great Northern signal box in its original position, a two-road locomotive shed and a passenger waiting room which houses a museum and shop. In 1997 the level crossing was relaid and allowed access over the road for the railway to bring rolling stock that had been stored on the north side of the crossing. Between 2001 and 2004, the north (down) platform was developed with a toilet block, garden and running in board. By this point, the track extended north for a distance of ¾ of a mile. A major step for the LWR came in 2004 when HMRI approved the signalling for use. This then enabled the railway to run trains in the dark for the first time at Hallow'een. Tracklaying reached North Thoresby in 2008 and the first train for 47 years between the two stations ran on 26 August 2009.

The Lincolnshire Wolds Railway plans to extend the line in both directions to Louth via Utterby and Fotherby and via Grainsby to the former Holton-le-Clay station, recreating 8 miles between Holton Le Clay and Louth. The trackbed through to Waltham has been built over at Waltham and Holton Village halt and thus making it impossible to rebuild the railway to Waltham. The stationmaster's house has survived and is available as a holiday let. The goods shed also remains, but is in private ownership.

== Sources ==
- Butt, R. V. J. (October 1995). The Directory of Railway Stations: details every public and private passenger station, halt, platform and stopping place, past and present (1st ed.). Sparkford: Patrick Stephens Ltd. ISBN 978-1-85260-508-7. OCLC 60251199. OL 11956311M.
- Clinker, C.R. (October 1978). Clinker's Register of Closed Passenger Stations and Goods Depots in England, Scotland and Wales 1830-1977. Bristol: Avon-Anglia Publications & Services. ISBN 0-905466-19-5.
- King, P.K.; Hewins, D.R. (1998) [1989]. The Railways around Grimsby, Cleethorpes, Immingham & North-East Lincolnshire. Romiley, Stockport: Foxline Publishing. ISBN 978-1-870119-04-7.
- Ludlam, A.J. (1991). The East Lincolnshire Railway (OL82). Headington, Oxford: The Oakwood Press. ISBN 0-85361-416-4.
- Conolly, W. Philip (2004) [1958]. British Railways Pre-Grouping Atlas and Gazetteer. Hersham, Surrey: Ian Allan Ltd. ISBN 978-0-7110-0320-0.
- Stennett, Alan (2007). Lost Railways of Lincolnshire. Newbury, Berkshire: Countryside Books. ISBN 978-1-84674-040-4.
