= North Thoresby railway station =

Heritage station in Lincolnshire, England

North Thoresby
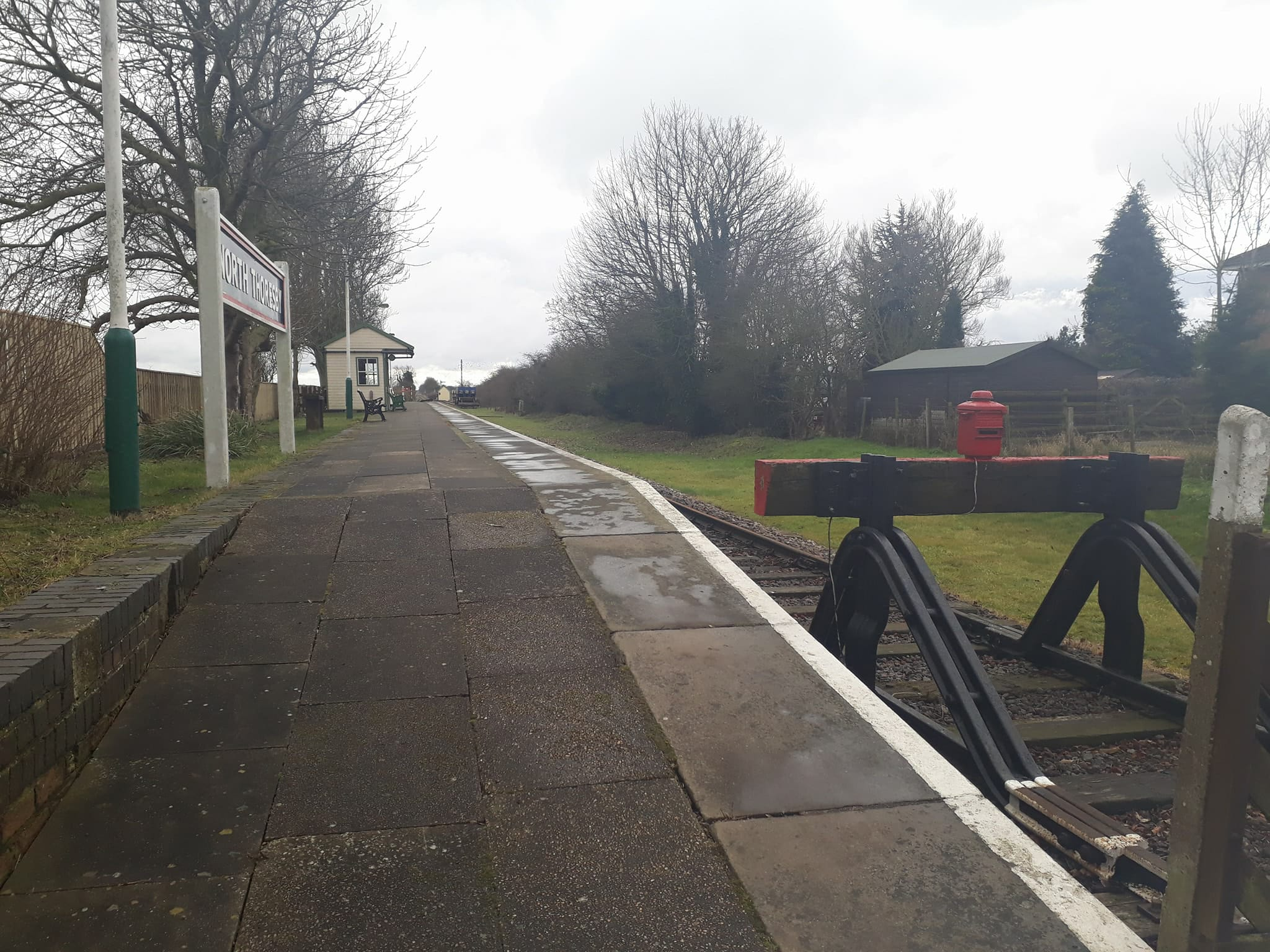
- North Thoresby up platform in 2018

General information
- Location: North Thoresby, East Lindsey; England
- Coordinates: 53.4681°N 0.0410°W
- Grid reference: TF301986
- System: Station on heritage railway
- Operator: Lincolnshire Wolds Railway
- Platforms: 2

History
- Original company: East Lincolnshire Railway
- Pre-grouping: Great Northern Railway
- Post-grouping: London and North Eastern Railway; Eastern Region of British Railways

Key dates
- 1 March 1848: Opened
- 30 December 1963: Goods facilities withdrawn
- 5 October 1970: Closed to passengers
- December 1980: Closure of line
- 26 August 2009: Reopened by LWR
Location

North Thoresby is a heritage railway station in North Thoresby, Lincolnshire. The station, which was previously part of the East Lincolnshire Railway, closed in 1970, but has since been reopened by the Lincolnshire Wolds Railway. The first services to the station from Ludborough, to the south, ran in August 2009, the first in 47 years. The LWR aims to extend the line further in both directions, northwards as far as Holton-Le-Clay and southwards to Louth.

== History ==
The station was opened on 1 March 1848 to serve the Lincolnshire village of North Thoresby. It was constructed by contractor John Waring and Sons of Rotherham who, in December 1846, had agreed to construct the line between Grimsby and Louth for the sum of £46,102 (equivalent to £4,650,000 in 2025). The architects of the station buildings were John Grey Weightman and Matthew Ellison Hadfield of Sheffield.

The station was provided with staggered platforms either side of a level crossing; the up platform to the south of the crossing and the down to the north. The stationmaster's house, similar to that at Ludborough, was adjacent to the down platform and comprised the booking office and passenger waiting room.

A signal box which contained 25 levers was situated on the north side of the level crossing and controlled the crossing gates as well as access to the small goods yard with a siding on each side of the line. The siding on the down side ran into a loading dock behind the down platform. Unlike Ludborough, the station had no goods shed. The goods yard closed on 30 December 1963, but the station remained open to passengers until 5 October 1970. In 1956–57, around a dozen passenger trains bound for Grimsby called at the station on weekdays, with the first two being local workings from Louth, save for a Mondays only service which called only to set down passengers. In the other direction, fewer services ran through to Peterborough North, but the up/down passenger workings balanced once services to Louth were taken into account. North Thoresby was the only intermediate station between Grimsby and Louth to remain open until October 1970.After 1970 the down line was removed and only the up line through the station remained. The line finally closed in December 1980.

Preceding station	Heritage railways	Following station
Terminus	Lincolnshire Wolds Railway	Ludborough Terminus
Planned extensions
Holton-le-Clay Terminus	Lincolnshire Wolds Railway	Ludborough Terminus
Historical railways
Grainsby Halt; Line and station closed	Great Northern Railway; East Lincolnshire Line	Ludborough; Line and station open

== Preservation and reopening ==
On 28 September 1991, the Grimsby and Louth Light Railway Order 1991 (SI 1991/2210 was granted authorising the reinstatement of the East Lincolnshire Railway between Waltham and the former Keddington Road level crossing near Louth, which would include the line through North Thoresby.

Tracklaying by the Lincolnshire Wolds Railway reached North Thoresby in 2008 and the first train for 47 years between the two stations ran on 26 August 2009. The south (up) platform has been restored and a waiting shelter erected. The level crossing to the north has been tarmaced over, but the north crossing gate has survived. The stationmaster's house remains in private occupation.

The LWR plans to extend the line northwards beyond North Thoresby to as far as Holton-Le-Clay, which will involve reinstating the adjacent level crossing at the station.

== Sources ==
- Butt, R. V. J. (October 1995). The Directory of Railway Stations: details every public and private passenger station, halt, platform and stopping place, past and present (1st ed.). Sparkford: Patrick Stephens Ltd. ISBN 978-1-85260-508-7. OCLC 60251199. OL 11956311M.
- Clinker, C.R. (October 1978). Clinker's Register of Closed Passenger Stations and Goods Depots in England, Scotland and Wales 1830-1977. Bristol: Avon-Anglia Publications & Services. ISBN 0-905466-19-5.
- King, P.K.; Hewins, D.R. (1998) [1989]. The Railways around Grimsby, Cleethorpes, Immingham & North-East Lincolnshire. Romiley, Stockport: Foxline Publishing. ISBN 978-1-870119-04-7.
- Ludlam, A.J. (1991). The East Lincolnshire Railway (OL82). Headington, Oxford: The Oakwood Press. ISBN 0-85361-416-4.
- Conolly, W. Philip (2004) [1958]. British Railways Pre-Grouping Atlas and Gazetteer. Hersham, Surrey: Ian Allan Ltd. ISBN 978-0-7110-0320-0.
