= Louth North railway station =

Railway station in Lincolnshire, England

Louth North

General information
- Location: Louth, East Lindsey; England
- Coordinates: 53.384102°N 0.006136°W
- System: Station on heritage railway
- Operator: Great Northern & East Lincolnshire Railway plc Lincolnshire Wolds Railway
- Platforms: ?

History
- Original company: Lincolnshire Wolds Railway

Key dates
- 1980: line closed to all traffic
- 1998: first trains run at Ludborough
- 26 August 2009: Opening to North Thoresby
- 2017: clearance begins towards Utterby site
Location

Louth North railway station is the future southern terminus of the Lincolnshire Wolds Railway where it will occupy a new site on the Fairfield industrial site.

== History ==
The line was opened in 1848 as the East Lincolnshire Railway which served the towns of Grimsby, Louth and Boston.

It was opened to passengers the same year with stations at Ludborough, North Thoresby and Waltham while there were various halts along the Grimsby-Louth section which opened during the railmotor era of the line, but all these closed in the 1930s/60s.

== Closure ==
The line was closed from Grimsby-Firsby to passengers on October 5, 1970. The Louth-Firsby section was quickly lifted.

The line from Louth-Grimsby was singled and remained open to freight to serve the Associated British Maltsters and the occasional rail tour until December 1980 when the line was closed, despite demands not to close it.

The station buildings were demolished at most of the stations along with the signal boxes. The only two original signal boxes to remain on the line were Hainton Street in Grimsby and Louth North. The original grain store remains at Ludborough and the original station master houses remain at Ludborough, North Thoresby and Holton-le-Clay. Louth station building still remains, and is Grade II listed, but has been converted to flats.

== Reopening ==
In 1978, a small preservation group called the Grimsby-Louth Rail group was set up with aims to preserve the entire section. However, as the Waltham-Grimsby section has been turned into a bypass road, and could not be preserved as a railway, the group was renamed to Grimsby-Louth Railway preservation society.

A new company, the Great Northern and East Lincolnshire Railway plc, was formed to purchase the 11-mile (18 km) trackbed from Louth to Waltham as BR would not sell to a society. The company now trades under the name Lincolnshire Wolds Railway.

In 1991 a light railway order was granted to the Great Northern and East Lincolnshire Railway plc who then bought 11 miles (18 km) of trackbed between Keddington Road, Louth and Waltham.

The original plan was to extend to Waltham and to the former level crossing at Keddington road, however plans forced the LWR to lose two miles of the original trackbed due to the section between Holton-le-Clay and Waltham being built on by housing. The railway will as and when time and money permit run from Holton-le-Clay station-Louth(LWR). A distance of approx. 8–9 miles.

The plan to reach Grimsby has since been thwarted as a result of the construction of the Peaks Parkway which runs the course of the railway, north of Waltham itself.

Preceding station	Heritage railways	Following station
Planned extensions
Fotherby Halt towards North Thoresby	Lincolnshire Wolds Railway	Terminus
