= Waltham railway station (England) =

Former railway station in Waltham, Lincolnshire, England

Coordinates: 53.5235°N 0.0640°W

Waltham

General information
- Location: New Waltham, North East Lincolnshire; England
- Grid reference: TA283047
- Platforms: 2

Other information
- Status: Disused

History
- Original company: East Lincolnshire Railway
- Pre-grouping: Great Northern Railway
- Post-grouping: London and North Eastern Railway; Eastern Region of British Railways

Key dates
- 1 March 1848: Opened as Waltham and Humberstone
- ?: Renamed
- 11 September 1961: Closed to passengers
- 15 June 1964: Goods facilities withdrawn
- December 1980: Closure of line
Location

Waltham was a railway station on the East Lincolnshire Railway which served the villages of New Waltham and Humberston in Lincolnshire between 1848 and 1964. It was originally named Waltham and Humberstone, but Humberstone was dropped soon after opening. The line through Waltham remained open for freight until December 1980.

== History ==
The station opened on 1 March 1848 as part of the East Lincolnshire Railway between Grimsby and Louth. It was constructed by contractor John Waring and Sons of Rotherham who, in December 1846, had agreed to construct the line for the sum of £46,102 (equivalent to £4,650,000 in 2025). The architects of the station buildings were John Grey Weightman and Matthew Ellison Hadfield of Sheffield.

The station was initially named Waltham and Humberstone, although it was in fact two miles from each village. It consisted of staggered platforms either side of a level crossing; the down platform to the north and the up to the south. The stationhouse, which was visible from the road, was situated on the south side of the crossing, on the down side of the line. Opposite, at the end of the lay a signal box of typical East Lincolnshire Railway construction; this controlled the crossing and a small goods yard adjacent to the down line. The yard initially handled coal and potatoes, but was later expanded to take cattle with the addition of a large cattle holding pen at its southern end. The goods yard was served by a single siding trailing off the down line which forked either side of the cattle pen. A row of three terraced railwayman's cottages were built on the south side of the crossing, adjacent to the signal box.

The arrival of the railway at Waltham led to the development of the area around the station and the creation of a thriving village known as New Waltham. The parish of New Waltham was created in 1961. The July 1922 timetable saw 13 up and down weekday services, plus one Sunday service each way, call at Waltham. The station closed to passengers on 11 September 1961, with the goods yard remaining open until 15 June 1964. The line through Waltham was closed at the end of 1980.

Preceding station	Disused railways	Following station
Weelsby Road Halt; Line and station closed	Great Northern Railway; East Lincolnshire Line	Holton Village Halt; Line and station closed

== Present day ==
Tracklifting commenced in early 1981, with the section between Grimsby and Waltham - constructed of bullhead rail - being the last to be removed. This section was designated by Humberside County Council for the building of the A16 Peaks Parkway. The roadworks put an end to hopes by the Great Northern and East Lincolnshire Railway plc to put the railway back in to Grimsby.

The station site survived largely intact until 2009 when, following a structural survey, it was determined that the Station House was beyond restoration due to water damage in the foundation level and would have to be demolished. The Station House was deconstructed and rebuilt on exactly the same foot print after the footings were raised 4 feet to match the average level of New waltham and many of the original features returned to the exterior. The rebuilt house retains the name of "Station House". The former goods yard with 7 new houses built on the original grounds is now called "Station Mews" and involving the construction of eight properties (including the station house reconstruction) accessed by a private road, although has not been fully completed to this date by the developer "Station Mews Development Company". The original three terraced cottages with outbuildings, adjacent to the up platform and signal box, survive to this day.

On 28 September 1991, the Grimsby and Louth Light Railway Order 1991 (SI 1991/2210) was obtained which authorises the reinstatement of the East Lincolnshire Railway between Waltham and the former Keddington Road level crossing near Louth. The Lincolnshire Wolds Railway had intended on opening a station at Waltham. However, as developers have built over the track bed to the south at Holton-le-Clay and at Waltham itself, it is now impossible to re-lay the track as far as Waltham. On 26 August 2009, the first train between North Thoresby and Ludborough ran for the first time in 47 years.

== Sources ==
- Butt, R. V. J. (October 1995). The Directory of Railway Stations: details every public and private passenger station, halt, platform and stopping place, past and present (1st ed.). Sparkford: Patrick Stephens Ltd. ISBN 978-1-85260-508-7. OCLC 60251199. OL 11956311M.
- Clinker, C.R. (October 1978). Clinker's Register of Closed Passenger Stations and Goods Depots in England, Scotland and Wales 1830-1977. Bristol: Avon-Anglia Publications & Services. ISBN 0-905466-19-5.
- Goode, C.T. (1985). The Railways of North Lincolnshire. Anlaby, Hull: C.T. Goode. ISBN 978-0-9508239-7-3.
- King, P.K.; Hewins, D.R. (1998) [1989]. The Railways around Grimsby, Cleethorpes, Immingham & North-East Lincolnshire. Romiley, Stockport: Foxline Publishing. ISBN 978-1-870119-04-7.
- Ludlam, A.J. (1991). The East Lincolnshire Railway (OL82). Headington, Oxford: The Oakwood Press. ISBN 0-85361-416-4.
- Conolly, W. Philip (2004) [1958]. British Railways Pre-Grouping Atlas and Gazetteer. Hersham, Surrey: Ian Allan Ltd. ISBN 978-0-7110-0320-0.
- Stennett, Alan (2007). Lost Railways of Lincolnshire. Newbury, Berkshire: Countryside Books. ISBN 978-1-84674-040-4.
