= Grainsby =

Hamlet and civil parish in the East Lindsey district of Lincolnshire, England

Coordinates: 53.475960°N 0.076045°W

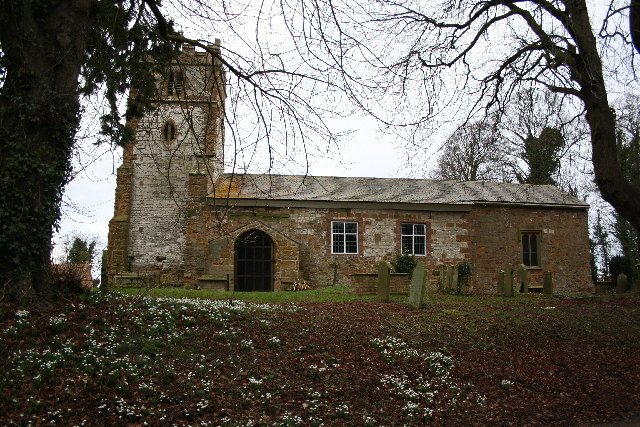
- Church of St Nicholas, Grainsby

- Location within Lincolnshire
- Population: 152 (2011)
- OS grid reference: TF277994
  - London: 135 mi (217 km) S
- District: East Lindsey
- Shire county: Lincolnshire
- Region: East Midlands
- Country: England
- Sovereign state: United Kingdom
- Post town: GRIMSBY
- Postcode district: DN36
- Police: Lincolnshire
- Fire: Lincolnshire
- Ambulance: East Midlands
- UK Parliament: Louth and Horncastle

Grainsby is a hamlet and civil parish in the East Lindsey district of Lincolnshire, England. It is situated 5 miles (8 km) south from Grimsby, and just to the west from the A16 road. The nearest village is North Thoresby, 1 mile (1.6 km) to the south-east.

Grainsby church is dedicated to St Nicholas.

== Grainsby Hall ==
Grainsby Hall was a country estate close to Grainsby.

In the 18th century Grainsby Hall was owned by the Nettleship-family. Francis Nettleship, who was the last member of the family, died in 1797. He left most of his property to his servant Elizabeth Borrell, who already owned land and the mansion house. When she died in 1826, the property was inherited by her niece Elizabeth Charlotte Borrell, who married William Haigh of Halifax in 1827. Their son was George Henry Haigh (1829–1887), the father of George Henry Caton Haigh.

In 1905 The Haigh-family arranged that a railway halt was built, 2 km from the Hall, Grainsby Halt railway station on the East Lincolnshire Railway. The station closed in 1952.

Grainsby Hall was demolished in 1972. The only part that now remains is a stable block, that is a Grade II listed building.
