= Holton-le-Clay =

Village and civil parish in Lincolnshire, England

Coordinates: 53.505500°N 0.058516°W

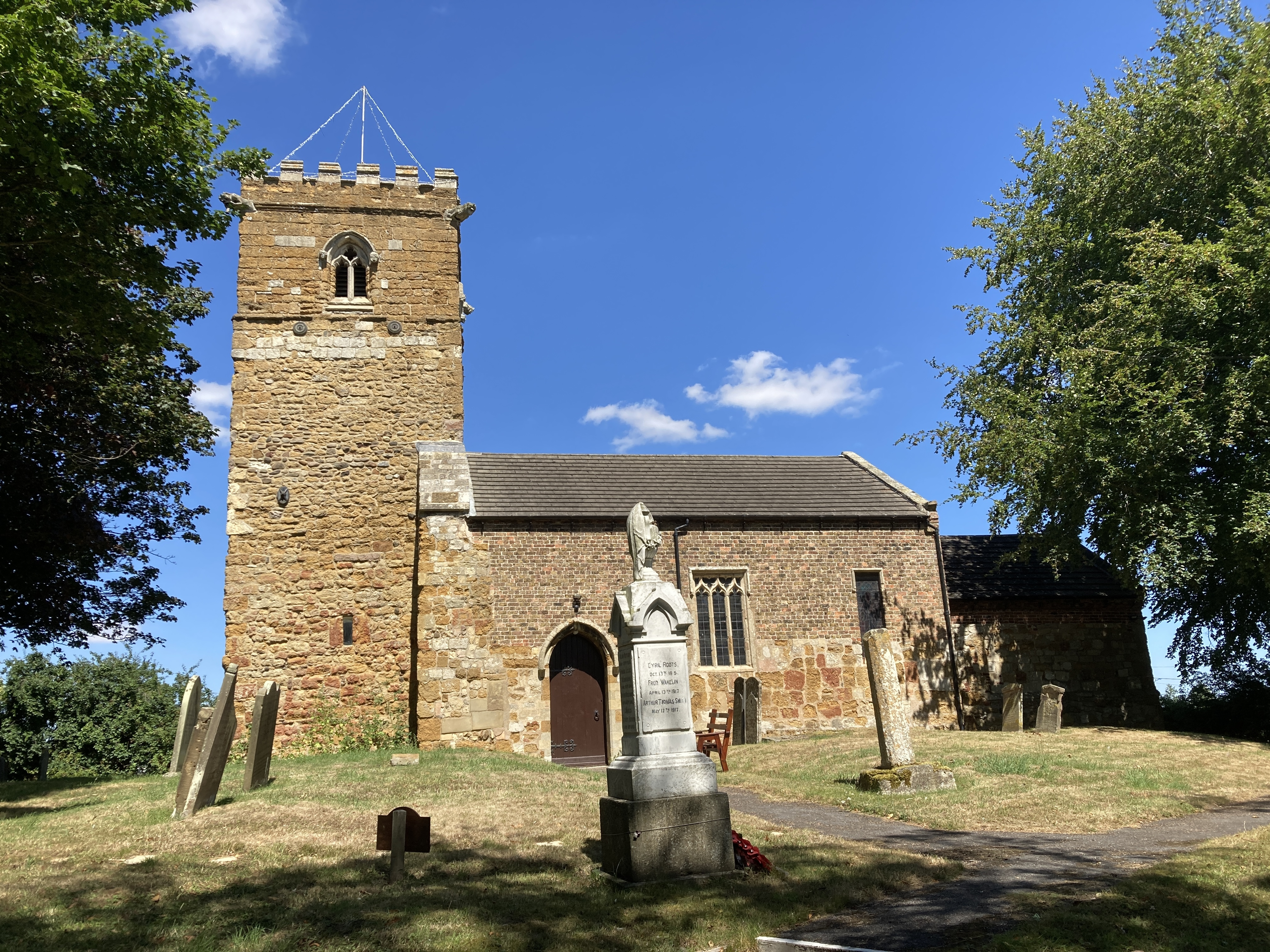
- St Peter's Church, Holton le Clay

- Location within Lincolnshire
- Population: 3,691 (2011)
- OS grid reference: TA288027
  - London: 140 mi (230 km) S
- District: East Lindsey
- Shire county: Lincolnshire
- Region: East Midlands
- Country: England
- Sovereign state: United Kingdom
- Post town: Grimsby
- Postcode district: DN36
- Police: Lincolnshire
- Fire: Lincolnshire
- Ambulance: East Midlands
- UK Parliament: Louth and Horncastle

Holton-le-Clay is a village and civil parish in the East Lindsey district of Lincolnshire, England, around 5 miles (8.0 km) south of Grimsby.

== History ==
Ditched enclosures and boundaries of possible prehistoric or Roman origin have been found, and earthworks of Medieval origin, with tofts and crofts, are evident within and around the village.

In the Domesday Book of 1086, the village is written as "Holtone". It was within the manor of Tetney in the then Lindsey North Riding, and prior to the Norman Conquest it was under the lordships of a Swein and Thorgisl. By 1086 the manor had fallen under the lordship of Ivo Taillebois.

In 1885 Kelly's Directory noted a parish area of 1,430 acres (5.8 km^{2}) acres, and an 1881 population of 283. Production of crops was chiefly of wheat, barley, oats, turnips and seeds. Principal landowners included the Earl of Scarborough DL, and George Henry Haigh DL JP of Grainsby Hall, Grimsby, Lincolnshire. The manor was owned by the Duchy of Lancaster, and rented to Sir Hugh Henry Cholmeley Bt DL JP of Easton Park. There was a Wesleyan chapel, built in 1827, and a Primitive Methodist chapel dated 1836. At the time Holton-le-Clay railway station was on the East Lincolnshire branch of the Great Northern Railway, 1.5 miles (2.4 km) south from the village. A further village station, Holton Village Halt, operated between 1905 and 1961.

== Landmarks ==
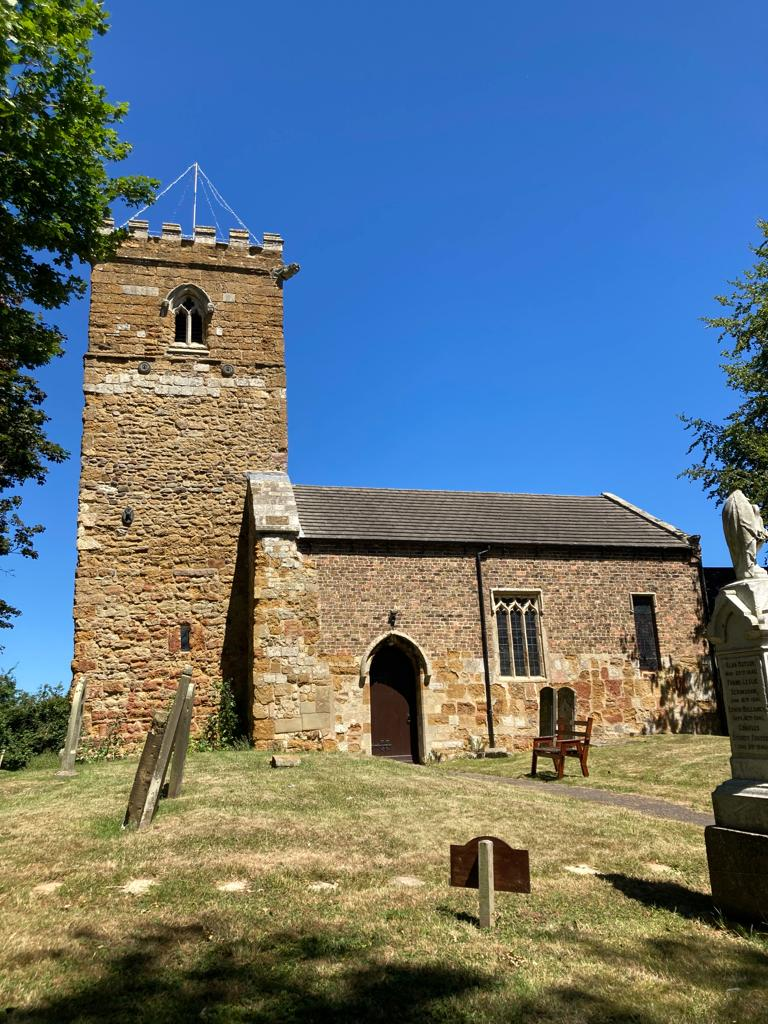
The parish church of St Peter in 2022

The village Grade II* listed Anglican church of St Peter is dedicated to St Peter. It consists of chancel, nave, and an embattled tower with three bells. Tower, chancel and nave arch are of Saxon or of very early Norman date. It was repaired and partly rebuilt in 1850 by William Hay, and restored and repaired in 1868. Cox noted that it was "nearly rebuilt in brick in 1850, but the tower is one of the many Lincolnshire instances of late Saxon architecture", and in 1964 Pevsner described it as "A rough and, at the time of writing, neglected church", with an 11th-century tower and west window, Decorated bell-openings, a Norman font, and a 1636 Paten cover. Within the churchyard is a 14th-century cross base and shaft.

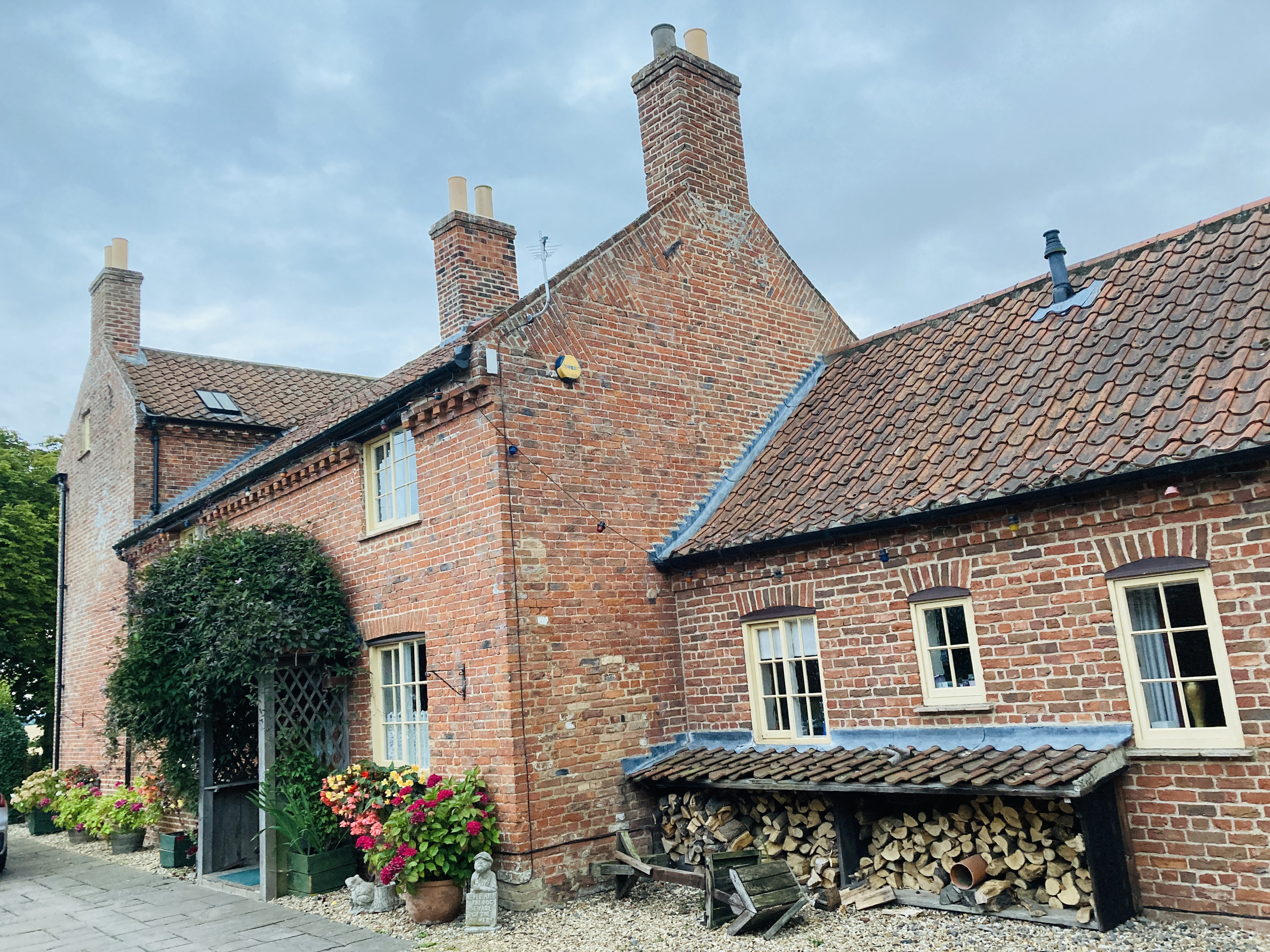
Holton Lodge farmhouse in 2022

Further listed buildings include ca.1800 Holton Lodge farm house, with attached pigeoncote.

Within the parish is Grade II listed Waithe Water Mill, dating from 1813.

== Geography ==
The A16 bypass crosses over the former RAF airfield. The bypass opened on Wednesday 29 November 1972.

== Education ==
The village has two schools, Holton-le-Clay Infants School and Holton-le-Clay Junior School, for primary school age children. Local secondary schools include Tollbar Academy at New Waltham. The village is also in the catchment area for Louth's Louth Academy, Louth Academy and King Edward VI Grammar School.

== Amenities ==
The village has convenience shops, a pharmacy and two hairdressers, kebab, pizza, and fish and chip takeaway outlets. On Pinfold Lane is a pizza outlet and an Indian restaurant. The former Coulbeck's Hardware store on Louth Road in the heart of the village now hosts the Four Candles Café, a play on words attributed to The Two Ronnies comedy sketch as a tribute to the building's former purpose.

The parish council has renovated the former Etherington Arms into a village facility 'The Hornet's Nest' which holds village events. The facility was officially opened in May 2014.

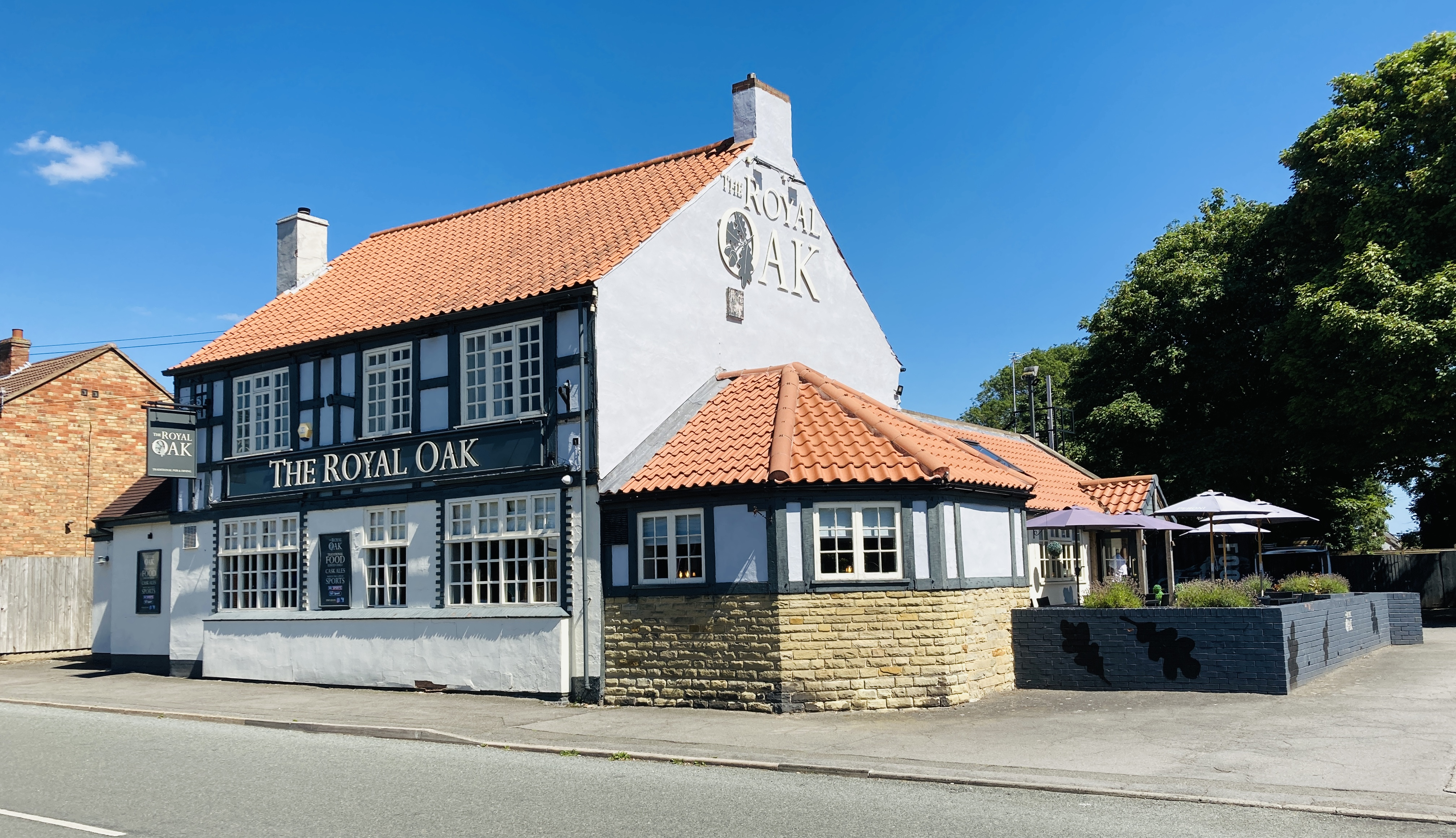
The Royal Oak public house

The village has three public houses. Local food establishments score very highly with the Food Standards Agency for hygiene, with 19 out of 21 businesses scoring the maximum 5 rating (Very Good) and 2 businesses scoring a 4 rating (Good).

Other facilities include Peacefield Business Park. which has the North Thoresby GP surgery, a children's daycare centre, and a beauty salon.

Holton-le-Clay Cricket Club is off Tetney Lane, providing football, cricket and entertainment activities. The Eight Acres Playing Field has two full-sized grass football pitches and children's play facilities, situated off Picksley Crescent.

Public transport is provided by the Stagecoach Group which runs a regular bus service to Grimsby and Louth. The bus service is equipped with WiFi for passengers.

== Annual events ==
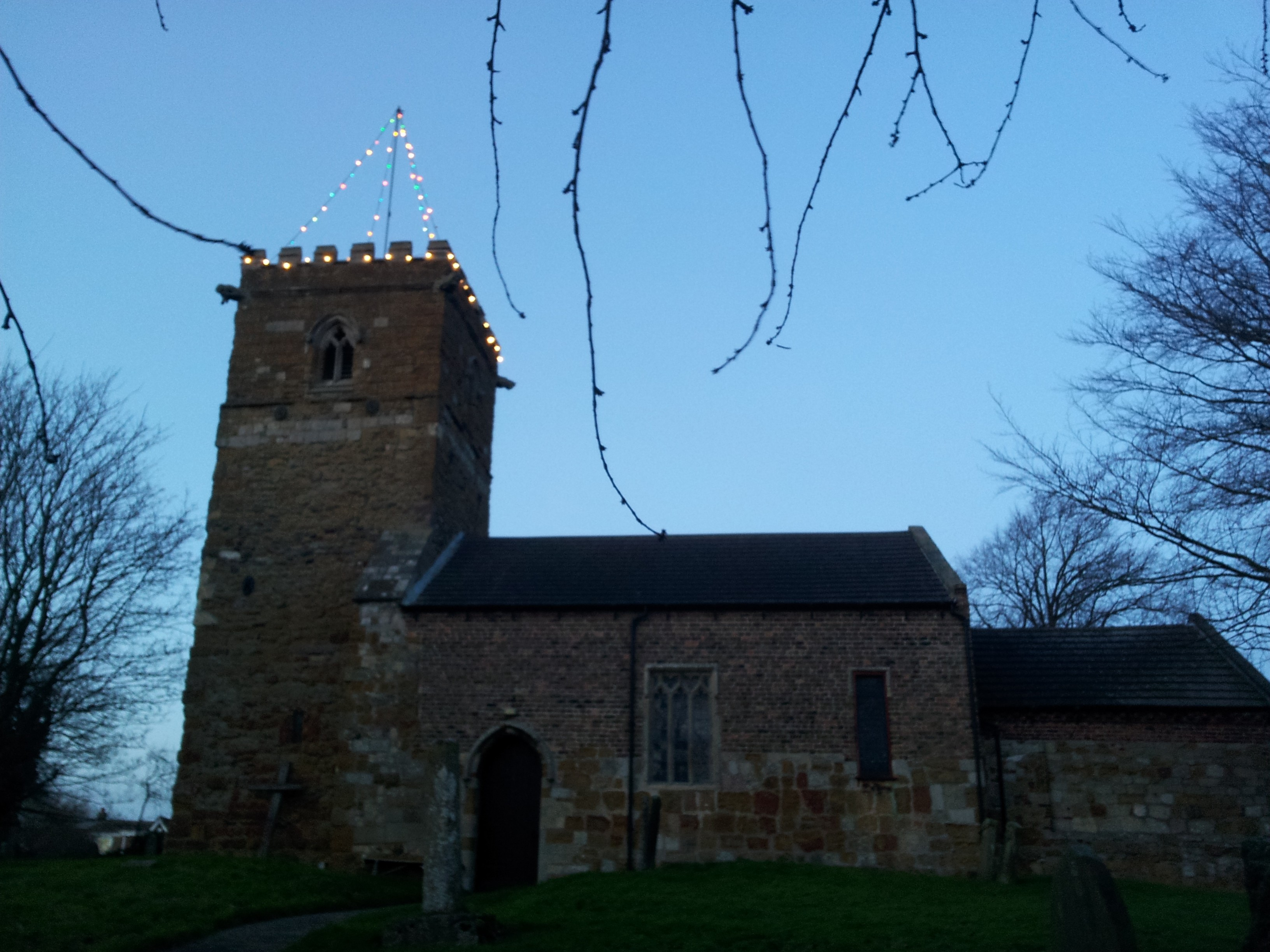
St Peter's Church with Christmas lights

Holton le Clay Cricket Club holds two main annual events. Holton Rocks!!! is a showcase of independent artists, and since its launch in 2010 it has attracted visitors of all ages and is family oriented. Some acts are tribute acts. The event culminates in a firework display.

Also at the club is a firework display to coincide with Bonfire Night during November. A bonfire is lit just before a large fireworks display. The event is usually held on a Friday or Saturday night.

A summer fayre is held during July at the village hall, with amusements, a display of vintage cars and tombola stalls.

== Local democracy ==
The Holton-le-Clay Parish Council is responsible for day-to-day village matters and produces regular minutes and agendas online.

== Policing ==
Holton-le-Clay is policed by the Louth Rural team of Lincolnshire Police. A small local police station operates part-time in the village and residents can sign up for an e-mail alerting service to keep track of local policing issues and incidents. Reported crimes for the village from January to August 2014 numbered 73.

== Notable people ==
- Hollie Arnold, the parasport athlete was born in Grimsby but grew up in Holton-le-Clay.
- Richard A. Collins (1966) – scientist and author, lived with his parents in Holton-le-Clay and Scartho for most of his youth.

== Sources ==
- Butt, R. V. J. (October 1995). The Directory of Railway Stations: details every public and private passenger station, halt, platform and stopping place, past and present (1st ed.). Sparkford: Patrick Stephens Ltd. ISBN 978-1-85260-508-7. OCLC 60251199. OL 11956311M.
