= John Grey Weightman =

English architect

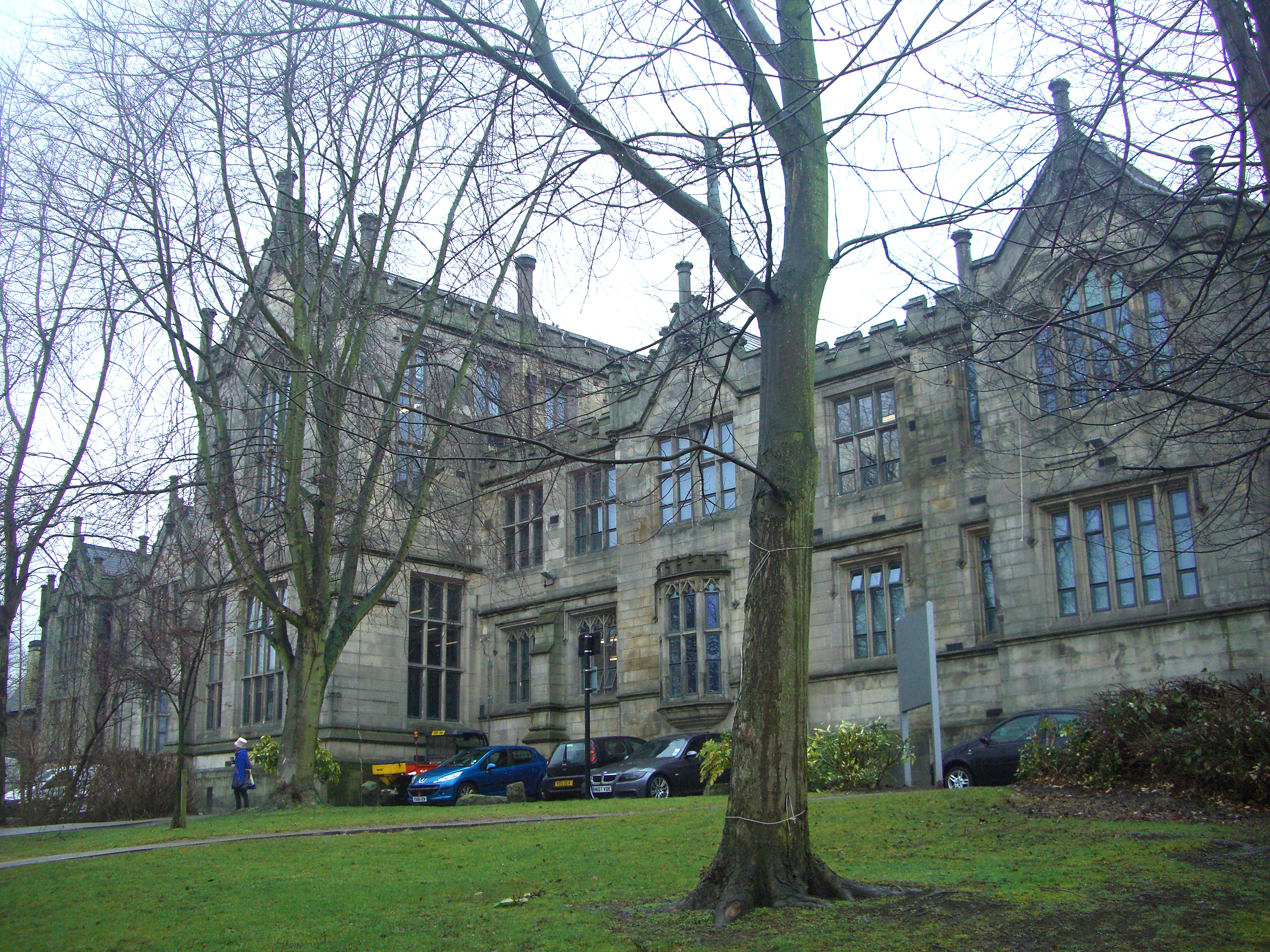
Collegiate School, Sheffield. 1836

John Grey Weightman (29 March 1809 – 9 December 1872) was an English architect based in Sheffield.

== Career ==
He was born on 29 March 1809 in Bawtry, West Riding of Yorkshire, the son of Robert Weightman and Mary Gray.

He trained in the offices of Charles Barry and Charles Robert Cockerell. Initially he practised alone in Sheffield from around 1832, but by 1834 he was working with Matthew Ellison Hadfield before entering a formal partnership in 1838 which lasted until 1858, after which he practised alone.

He married Mary Elizabeth Collinson (1802-1884). He died in Collingham, Nottinghamshire on 9 December 1872.

== Works ==
- Collegiate School, College Street, Leicester 1835-36
- Collegiate School (now University main building), Sheffield. 1836
- All Saints' Church, Glossop. 1831 rebuilding
- All Saints' Roman Catholic Church, Old Glossop. 1836
- Presbytery, Church Street, Old Glossop. 1836
- St Mary's Church, Shaw Street, Oldham, Lancashire. 1838 with Matthew Ellison Hadfield
- St Peter's Church, Spring Bank Road, Stalybridge. 1838-39 with Hadfield
- St Mary's Church, Worksop, 1838 to 1840, with Hadfield.
- Holy Trinity Church, Matlock Bath 1841-42
- Church of St Mary Immaculate, Blackbrook Road, St Helen's 1844-45
- St Andrew's Church, Garthorpe 1846 Restoration and new chancel.
- St Chad's Church, Cheetham Hill Road, Strangeways, Manchester. 1846-47 with Matthew Ellison Hadfield
- St Chad's Church and Presbytery, Stocks Street, Cheetham. 1846-47
- St Mary's Church, Little Crosby, Lancashire. 1845-47 with Matthew Ellison Hadfield
- Glossop railway station and Engine Sheds, Norfolk Street, Glossop. 1847
- St Bede's Church, Appleton Road, Halton, Widnes. 1847
- St Anne's Church, Carruthers Street, Ancoats, Manchester. 1847-48 with Matthew Ellison Hadfield
- Salford Cathedral 1844-48
- St Mary's Church, Mulberry Street, Manchester. 1848 with Matthew Ellison Hadfield
- Louth railway station 1848
- Ludborough railway station 1848
- North Thoresby railway station 1848
- Holton-le-Clay railway station 1848
- Waltham railway station 1848
- St Paul's Church, Hyde, 1853-54 with Matthew Ellison Hadfield and George Goldie
- St Mary's Church, Felland Street, Dukinfield. 1854-56 with Matthew Ellison Hadfield and George Goldie
- St Mary's Roman Catholic Church, Lanark 1856
- Church of St Charles Borromeo and Presbytery, Hadfield, Derbyshire. 1858
- St Mary's Church, Howard Road, Sheffield 1869
