= Tetney =

Village in the East Lindsey district of Lincolnshire, England

Coordinates: 53.492450°N 0.021846°W

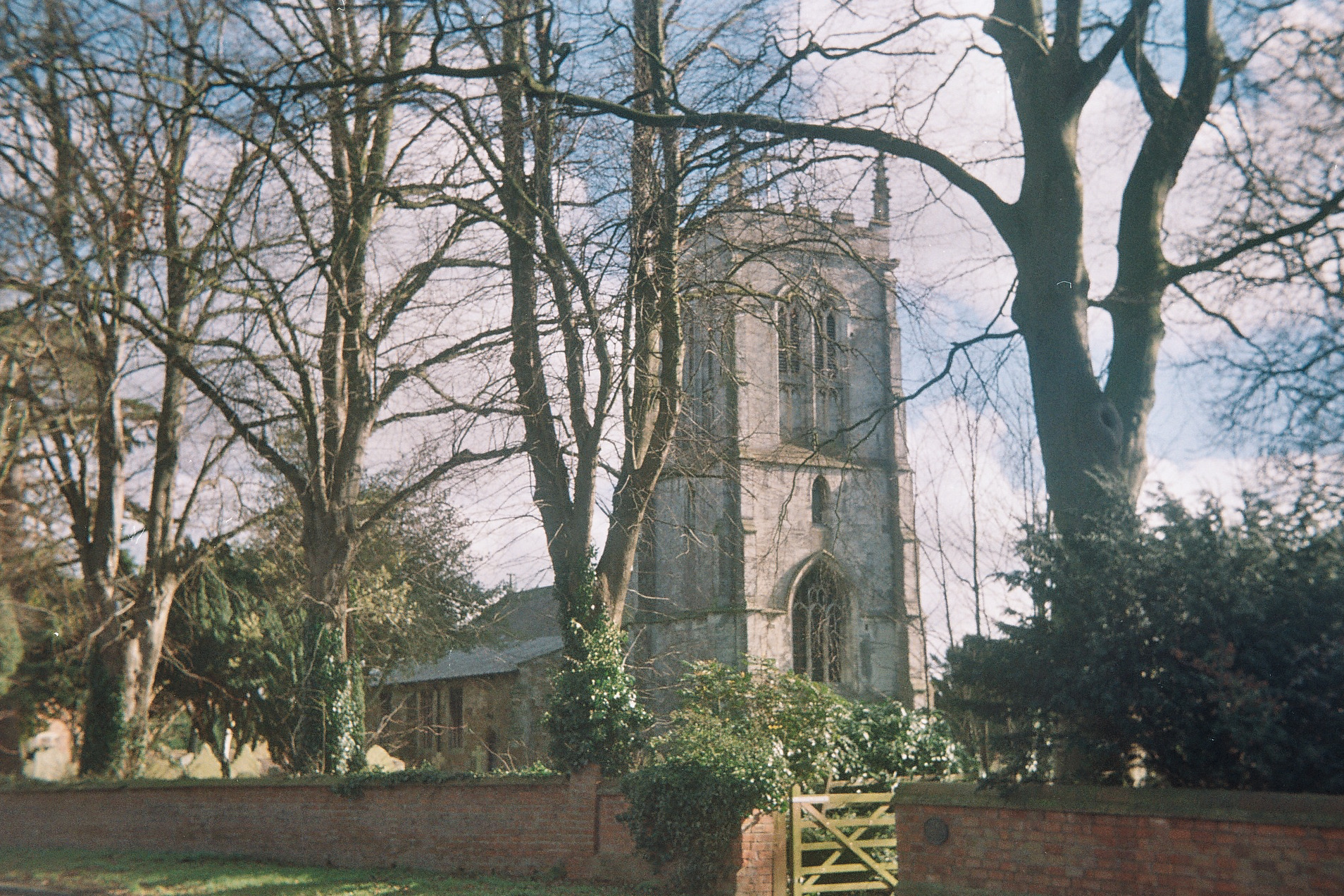
- Church of St Peter and St Paul, Tetney

- Location within Lincolnshire
- Population: 1,725 (2011)
- OS grid reference: TA314009
  - London: 145 mi (233 km) S
- District: East Lindsey
- Shire county: Lincolnshire
- Region: East Midlands
- Country: England
- Sovereign state: United Kingdom
- Post town: GRIMSBY
- Postcode district: DN36
- Dialling code: 01472
- Police: Lincolnshire
- Fire: Lincolnshire
- Ambulance: East Midlands
- UK Parliament: Louth and Horncastle

Tetney is a village in the East Lindsey district of Lincolnshire, England, just west of the Prime Meridian. It includes the hamlet of Tetney Lock located to the east of the village on the Louth Navigation canal.

== History ==
A 4,000-year-old Bronze Age wooden coffin was discovered at the Tetney Golf Club in July 2018 during work on a pond. The 10 ft long coffin, made from a hollowed-out tree trunk, held the remains of a high status man cushioned by plants and holding an axe, covered by a gravel mound. After conservation, the coffin will be displayed at Lincoln Museum.

The parish church is dedicated to St Peter and St Paul. An inscription on the second pillar from the west on the north arcade states: "This work was completed A.D. 1363 Robert Day the vicar". Some parts of the building are from an earlier church which stood on the same spot, including a doorway dating from about 1280.

Ordnance survey maps from the 1920s show an agricultural tramway running from the Humberstone Road (B1198) through Bishopthorpe to Low Farm. Such tramways often used WW1 narrow gauge trench railway equipment to allow year-round access to soft fenland fields. The area is now a wind farm.

On the edge of the village is the site of a Marconi beam station from where telegrams were sent to Australia and India as part of the Imperial Wireless Chain in 1927. When built it was state of the art, and it is important in the history of telecommunications because it established the first radio link between the United Kingdom and Australia. Only the bases for the masts remain; the administration buildings are now a small industrial complex.

Tetney Lock was the location of a heliport run by Bristow Helicopters which transported personnel to North Sea oil and gas rigs, but is now defunct, having operated from 1965 until the early 1970s. The hangars were converted into a turkey farm.

== Governance ==
An electoral ward in the same name exists. This ward includes North Coates and had a total population taken at the 2011 Census of 2,449.

== Geography and amenities ==
The village is on the A1031 Cleethorpes to Mablethorpe coastal road, 2.5 miles (4.0 km) south of Humberston, and 1 mile (1.6 km) east from Holton-le-Clay.

The village facilities include the primary school, the Plough Inn public house on the Market Place, a fish and chip shop, a village shop, a golf club, a garden centre, a Wesleyan chapel, a church and a village hall.

The village hall is situated at the playing fields, on Humberston Road. The playing fields include a cricket pitch and football pitch – previously there existed a grass tennis court. Tetney United Football Club were based at the village hall and playing fields, and played in the East Lincs Combination Football League.

To the east of the village on the road to Tetney Lock is an oil terminal which stores oil for the Humber Refinery. Oil has been delivered via the Tetney Monobuoy, since January 1971.

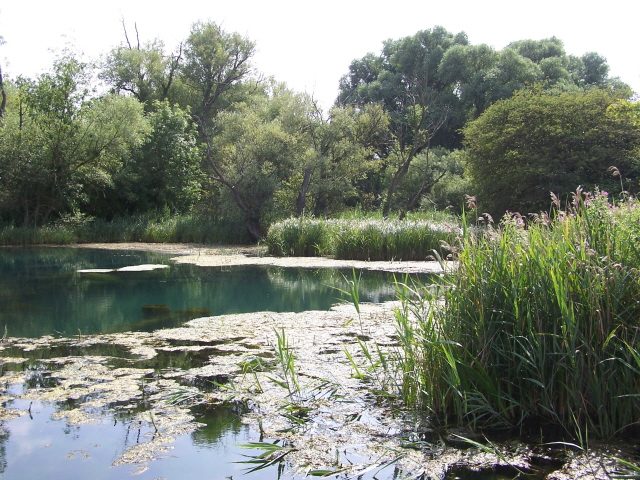
Tetney Blow Wells

To the east of the village are the Tetney Marshes, which cover over 1,500 hectares of coastal mudflats, salt marsh, dunes and saline lagoons on the north Lincolnshire coast, the reserve forms an important part of the Humber Estuary Site of Special Scientific Interest and Special Protection Area, administered by the RSPB as the Tetney Marshes nature reserve, which functions as a grazing marsh and home of lagoon sand shrimps and little terns which live near saline lagoons.

To the south of the village are the Tetney Blow Wells, a Lincolnshire Wildlife Trust nature reserve and SSSI. The Blow Wells are artesian springs flowing from the underlying chalk aquifer through the boulder clay to form a series of pools, which were used to supply a water cress farm from 1948 to 1961. The nature reserve is also a habitat for the cardinal beetle, and the Daubenton's bat.
