= Lincolnshire Wolds Railway =

Heritage railway in Lincolnshire, England

Coordinates: 53°26′41″N 0°01′55″W

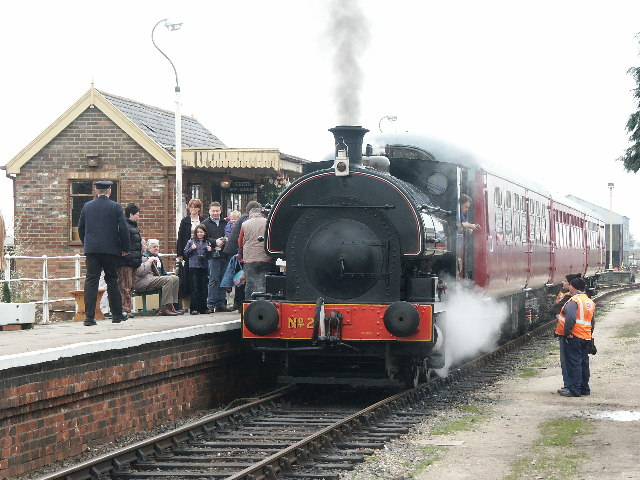
- Fulstow no. 2 at Ludborough
- Locale: Lincolnshire, England
- Terminus: Ludborough railway station

Commercial operations
- Name: London and North Eastern Railway
- Built by: East Lincolnshire Railway
- Original gauge: 4 ft 8 1/2 in (1,435 mm) standard gauge

Preserved operations
- Operated by: Lincolnshire Wolds Railway
- Stations: 5 (2 reopened so far)
- Length: 1.5 miles (2.4 km)
- Preserved gauge: 4 ft 8 1/2 in (1,435 mm) standard gauge

Commercial history
- Opened: 1848
- Closed: 1961 passengers, 1965 goods, line closed and abandoned 1980

Preservation history
- 1984: Society moves into derelict station at Ludborough
- 1998: line reopened
- 2008: line relaid to North Thoresby
- 26 August 2009: North Thoresby reopened
- Headquarters: Ludborough

The Lincolnshire Wolds Railway (LWR) is a heritage railway based at Ludborough station, near Louth, Lincolnshire, England and the only standard gauge steam railway in Lincolnshire open to the public. The line is part of the original Great Northern Railway (GNR), a rail system that opened in 1848 and once linked Grimsby, Louth and East Lincolnshire with London. In early 2002, 2009 and 2013 the Lincolnshire Wolds Railway received a top national award from the Heritage Railway Association for its heritage railway efforts.

== History ==
Construction of the railway began in 1846 and was completed in 1848. The line ran from Louth to New Holland and was officially opened on 28 March 1848 as the first section of the GNR. The line was constructed by the East Lincolnshire Railway Co (ELR), which leased it to the GNR when they could not raise sufficient funds to operate it. The GNR had obtained running rights over the MS&L from Grimsby to New Holland Pier; in return it allowed the MS&L running rights to Louth. The line south of Louth was extended as far as Boston in October 1848. The GNR ran the line with some of its famous C12 locomotives on the local services. From 1912 to 1913 Stirling single no.1 (preserved at the NRM York) was based at Louth shed (40c).

In 1923 the GNR, and with it the East Lincolnshire Railway, was absorbed by the London and North Eastern Railway (LNER). The LNER carried out some improvements on the line, including the replacement of the GNR Somersault signals with the more common upper quadrant at some locations. Box name boards were also changed from the black background with white lettering to the usual (and later BR specifications) white background with black lettering, although Louth South obtained an enamel sign, which remained on the box until its closure on 5 October 1970.

In 1948, Great Britain's railway assets were nationalised under the Transport Act 1947; it gave the assets to British Railways so that the railway would remain open. At that time, the line's passenger services were operated by steam railcar, but these were later replaced by diesel multiple units.

BR ran the line from 1948 until its eventual closure. BR had announced as early as 1965 that the line would close under the Beeching plan. The first attempt at closure failed after major local opposition and the Minister of Transport's refusal to close a major route. But in 1969 the minister gave BR permission to close the line despite massive local opposition. The line from Firsby Junction to Grimsby was closed after the last passenger train departed on 5 October 1970. The line from Firsby Junction to Louth was quickly lifted, and the infrastructure left to deteriorate.

The section from Louth to Grimsby was singled (the down line lifted), and was retained for an additional 10 years for grain traffic three times a week to the ABM building at Louth. In 1978 BR announced that grain traffic would cease, and that the line would be removed and abandoned. In 1978, a group known as the Grimsby-Louth Group was set up to fight the closure of the line.

When the end became inevitable, the group was renamed the Grimsby-Louth Railway Preservation Society, with the aim of preserving the line for continued use. Despite their efforts, British Rail announced that the line would completely close on 20 December 1980. The Grimsby-Louth rail group did run several Santa specials over the line. The last one ran on 20 December 1980. BR closed the line and quickly removed the rails, sleepers and ballast, making it harder for preservationists to restore the line.

== Preservation ==
In 1984 preservation efforts started rebuilding Ludborough Station to its former glory. The site had been virtually flattened by British Rail. All the buildings had been demolished, the railings and platform edges had been removed, as well as the track and ballast. The removal of the latter resulted in blocking the drains, with flooding of the site during rainstorms.

On 28 September 1991, preservationists obtained the Grimsby and Louth Light Railway Order 1991 (SI 1991/2210) to authorise the reinstatement of the East Lincolnshire Railway between Waltham and the former Keddington Road level crossing near Louth. On 30 August 2003, NER 0-4-0T LNER Class Y7 No. 68088 steamed on the Lincolnshire Wolds Railway. The section towards North Thoresby railway station was reopened in 2009, and on 26 August 2009, the first train between North Thoresby and Ludborough ran for the first time in 47 years.

Work has now begun on track re-laying at the south end of Ludborough station towards Utterby. Included in this work will be a new entrance to the engine shed coming in from the Louth direction. The new point work will be controlled by a 4-lever ground frame, which is released by Ludborough box and features in the new signalling system. The LWR launched an appeal in Summer 2012 to fund the purchase of track and ballast needed to extend the line.

== Operations ==
Ludborough station has been restored to its original condition and is a working station museum, complete with an operational signal box. A 1 3/4-mile (1.2 km) running line operates northwards to North Thoresby. Trains are operated by both steam and diesel locomotives. One of the line's diesel locomotives, no. D3167 (08102) has strong local connections. The 08 was the resident shunter at Lincoln Central for many years.

== Signalling on the LWR ==
The signalling used on the LWR is very basic but still forms a vital part of the operations. There are two signal boxes in use:

- Ludborough: built on the foundations of the original box, it is a close replica of what once stood there. Commissioned in 2004 by HMRI, the box was officially opened in 2005. It contains an 18 lever McKenzie and Holland lever frame which came from Hainton Street, Grimsby. It currently has four working levers, and a few more working levers are planned for the near future. Visitors are allowed in the box with the permission of the signalman.
- North Thoresby: situated off the end of the platform. It has a seven lever Eastern Region ground frame, and all the levers are in use. Its primary function is to control the siding and the main line in the platform.

Whilst North Thoresby has the conventional Upper quadrant signals, Ludborough has the more famous GNR somersault signals.

== Future of the LWR ==
The initial goal of reopening the line from Louth to Grimsby is no longer feasible, as part of the section between Grimsby and New Waltham was designated by Humberside County Council for the construction of the A16 Peaks Parkway Road, which was completed in 1998. These roadworks have made any future extension of the LWR to Grimsby Town impossible. However, the LWR aspires to reconstruct the entire surviving 9 miles (14 km) of track bed between a new site at Louth and Holton-le-Clay.

== Stations of the LWR ==
- Holton Le Clay – future northern terminus of the line
- North Thoresby (reopened in 2009)
- Ludborough (reopened in 1998)
- Fotherby
- Louth North – future southern terminus of the line (Louth (LWR)

== Locomotives ==
The current permanent stock of locomotives includes the following:

=== Operational steam locomotives ===
Number & Name	Builder/type	Wheel arrangement	Year built	Livery	Status	Notes	Image
1964 'Spitfire'	Andrew Barclay	0-4-0ST	1929		Operational	Returned to service in 2015 after overhaul.	

=== Non-operational Steam locomotives ===
- Peckett industrial 0-4-0ST works number 1351 'Lion'. built in 1914 In the shed undergoing overhaul.
- Peckett 0-4-0ST works number 1749 'Fulstow no. 2' built in 1928. Boiler ticket expired in 2020.
- RSH 0-6-0T works number 7597 'Zebedee'. built in 1949. Currently undergoing overhaul.
- Statens Järnvägar B Class 4-6-0 No.1313 built in 1918. Long term overhaul project 20yrs+

=== Operational diesel locomotives ===
- BR 0-6-0DE Class 08 no. D3167 (also 08102)
- W.G. Bagnall 0-6-0DM no. 3151 "Debbie DL2".

=== Diesel locomotives under repair ===
- Ruston & Hornsby 0-4-0DM 375713, Tioxide no 4
- Ruston & Hornsby 0-4-0DM 414303, Tioxide no 6
- Ruston & Hornsby 4wDM 421418, Tioxide no 7
- Fowler 0-4-0DM 4210131 ex Conoco
- Fowler 0-4-0DM 4210145 ex Conoco No 8
- Hunslet 4wDM 5308, Colonel B
