= George Henry Caton Haigh =

British ornithologist and botanist (1860–1941)

George Henry Caton Haigh FZS, MBOU, DL
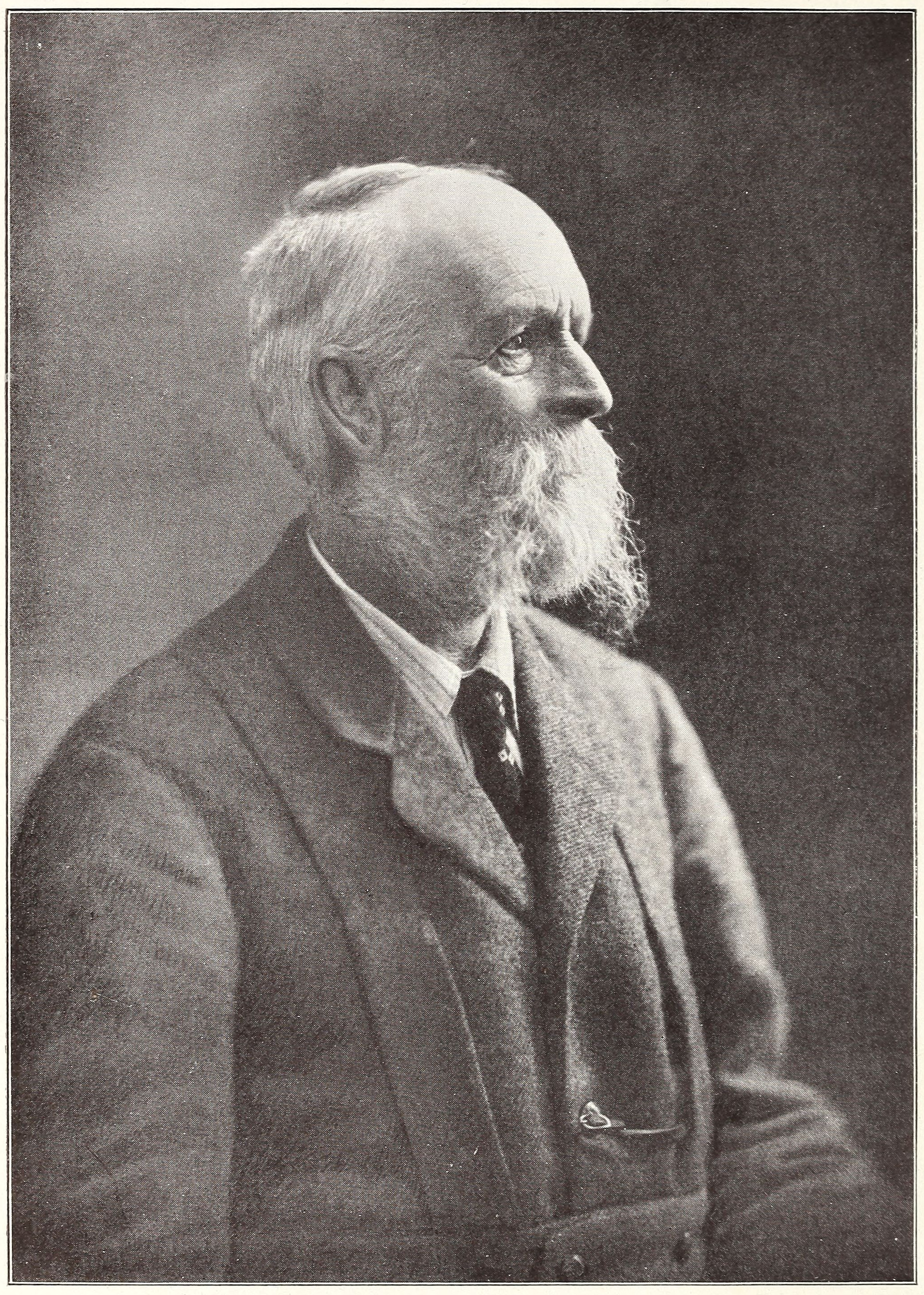
- Born: 1860
- Died: 11 February 1941 (aged 80–81)
- Scientific career
- Fields: Botany

George Henry Caton Haigh (1860 – 11 February 1941) FZS, MBOU, DL, was a world authority on Himalayan flowering trees and exotic plants. He was also a famous ornithologist and his manuscript collection is lodged in The Natural History Museum.

He was the eldest of five sons and three daughters of George Henry Haigh DL JP (1829–1887), of a Lincolnshire landed gentry family of Scottish origin, and Emma Jane Adelaide (1828–1919), daughter of politician Sir Robert Way Harty, 1st Baronet, of Dublin.

He was appointed High Sheriff of Lincolnshire for 1912.
