= Matthew Ellison Hadfield =

English architect

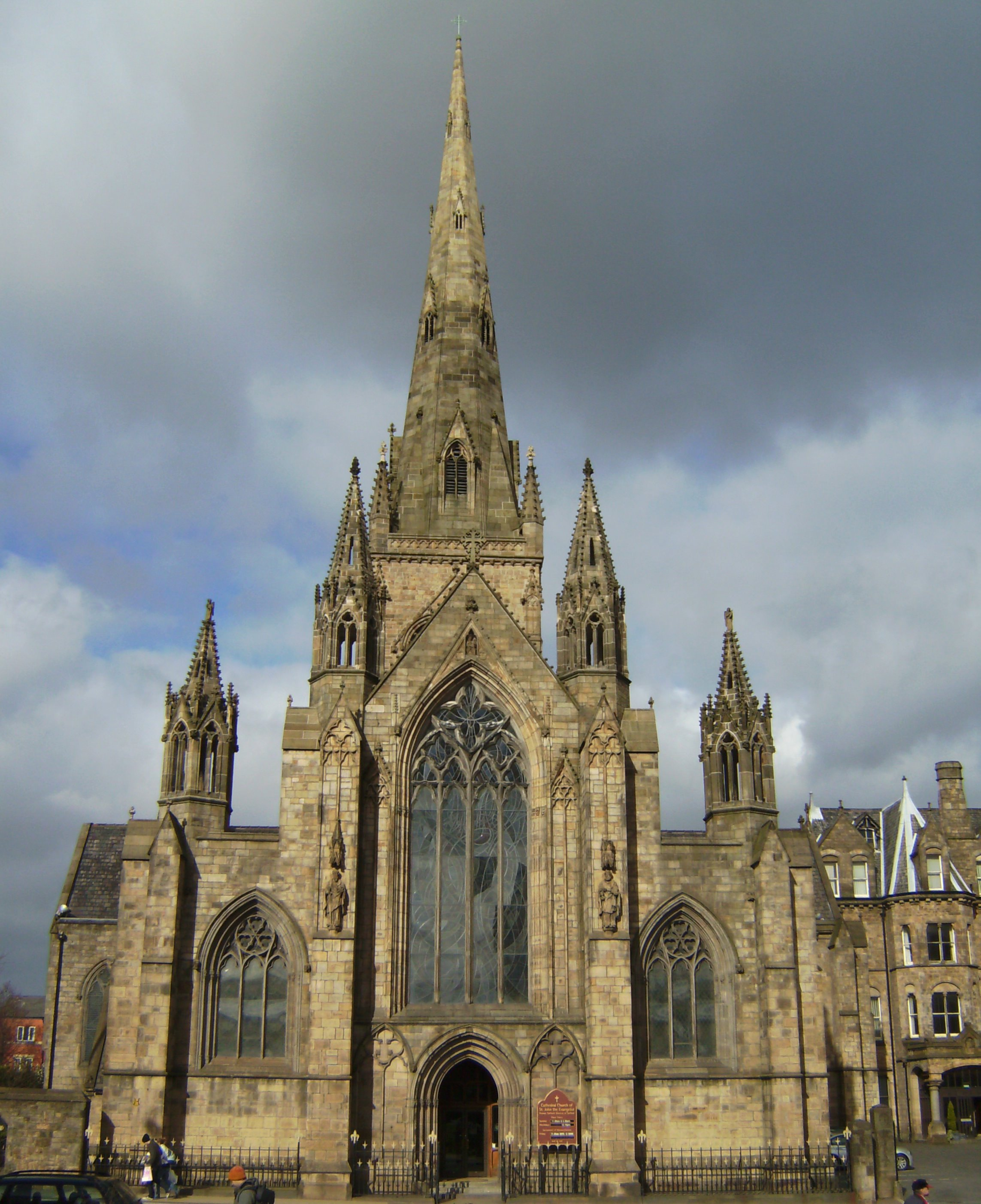
St John's Cathedral, Salford (1844–1848)

Matthew Ellison Hadfield (8 September 1812 – 9 March 1885) was an English architect of the Victorian Gothic Revival. He is chiefly known for his work on Roman Catholic churches, including the cathedral churches of Salford and Sheffield.

== Training ==
Hadfield was born at Lees Hall in Glossop, Derbyshire, the son of Joseph Hadfield and Mary Hadfield (née Ellison). He attended Woolton Grove Academy in Liverpool, and subsequently, between 1827 and 1831, he worked for his uncle Michael Ellison (his mother's brother), agent of the estates of the Dukes of Norfolk in Sheffield. From 1831 he was articled to the architectural firm of Woodhead and Hurst of Doncaster, and then to P. F. Robinson of London. He married Sarah Frith of Sheffield at around this time.

== Career ==
Practising as an architect in Sheffield from 1834, Hadfield's first commission was the design of the Cholera Monument in Sheffield, a memorial to the 402 victims of the cholera epidemic of 1832 in the city. In 1838 Hadfield entered a partnership in Sheffield with John Grey Weightman, which lasted until 1858. In 1850 they were joined by their former pupil George Goldie, and the partnership between Hadfield and Goldie lasted until 1860. During that time, they worked on several commissions in and around Manchester such as St Paul's Church in Hyde (1853-64) and St Mary's Church in Dukinfield (1856). From 1864 or 1865 Hadfield was in partnership with his son Charles Hadfield (1840–1916). After Hadfield's death in 1885, his son continued the practice, and was later joined in partnership by Hadfield's grandson Charles Matthew Ellison Hadfield (1867–1949).

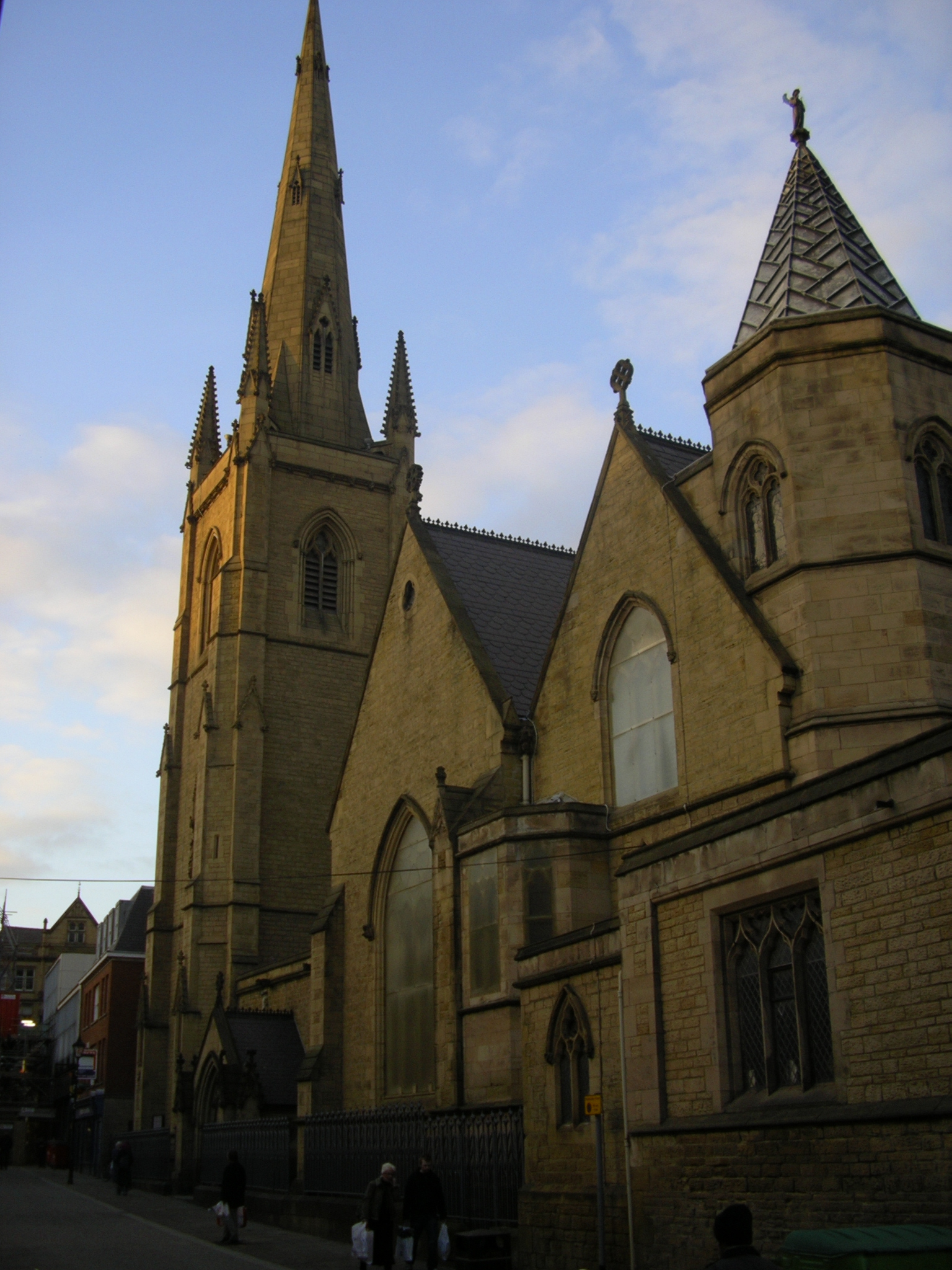
St Marie's Cathedral, Sheffield (1847–1850)

As an architect, Hadfield was an early follower of the Gothic Revival movement led by A.W.N. Pugin. Hadfield designed numerous Catholic churches, including All Saints, Glossop, St. Bede's, Rotherham, St Hilda's, Whitby, St Catherine's Church, Littlehampton and St Chad’s. His largest and most significant work was St John's Church in Salford (1844–1848) which in 1850 was elevated to cathedral status upon the restoration of the Catholic hierarchy in England and Wales. St John's was in the decorated style, as was St Marie's Church in Sheffield (1847–1850; elevated to cathedral status in 1980). A further cathedral commission, in the form of the Cathedral of the Annunciation and St. Nathy, Ballaghaderreen, in the diocese of Achonry, Ireland, came in 1855 (completed 1860).

Hadfield also designed railway stations, including that at Glossop, and those of the East Lincolnshire Railway together with Sheffield's Wicker Arches viaduct, in the neo-classical style, in 1848.

== Other buildings by Hadfield & Son ==
- St Mary's Church, Worksop (Weightman and Hadfield) in 1838.
- Our Lady of Sorrows Church, Bamford
- Sacred Heart Church, Hillsborough (C.M.Hadfield)
- Glossop Town Hall
- St Mary's Church, Grimsby
- St Mary's Church, Llanfair-yng-Nghornwy (restoration 1847, Weightman and Hadfield)
- Kenmure Castle, New Galloway, Kirkcudbrightshire, Scotland. 1879, additions and remodelling.
- Monastery of The Holy Spirit, Sheffield
- Chapel at St Michael's Cemetery, Sheffield
- St Vincent's Church, Sheffield (Chapel-school)
- Sheffield United Gas Light Company Offices
- Thornbury, Sheffield
- St Joseph's Church, Stockport
- St Marie's Primary School, Sheffield

== Sources ==
- Roderick O'Donnell, 'Matthew Ellison Hadfield', Oxford Dictionary of National Biography
