= East Lincolnshire Railway =

Railway in England

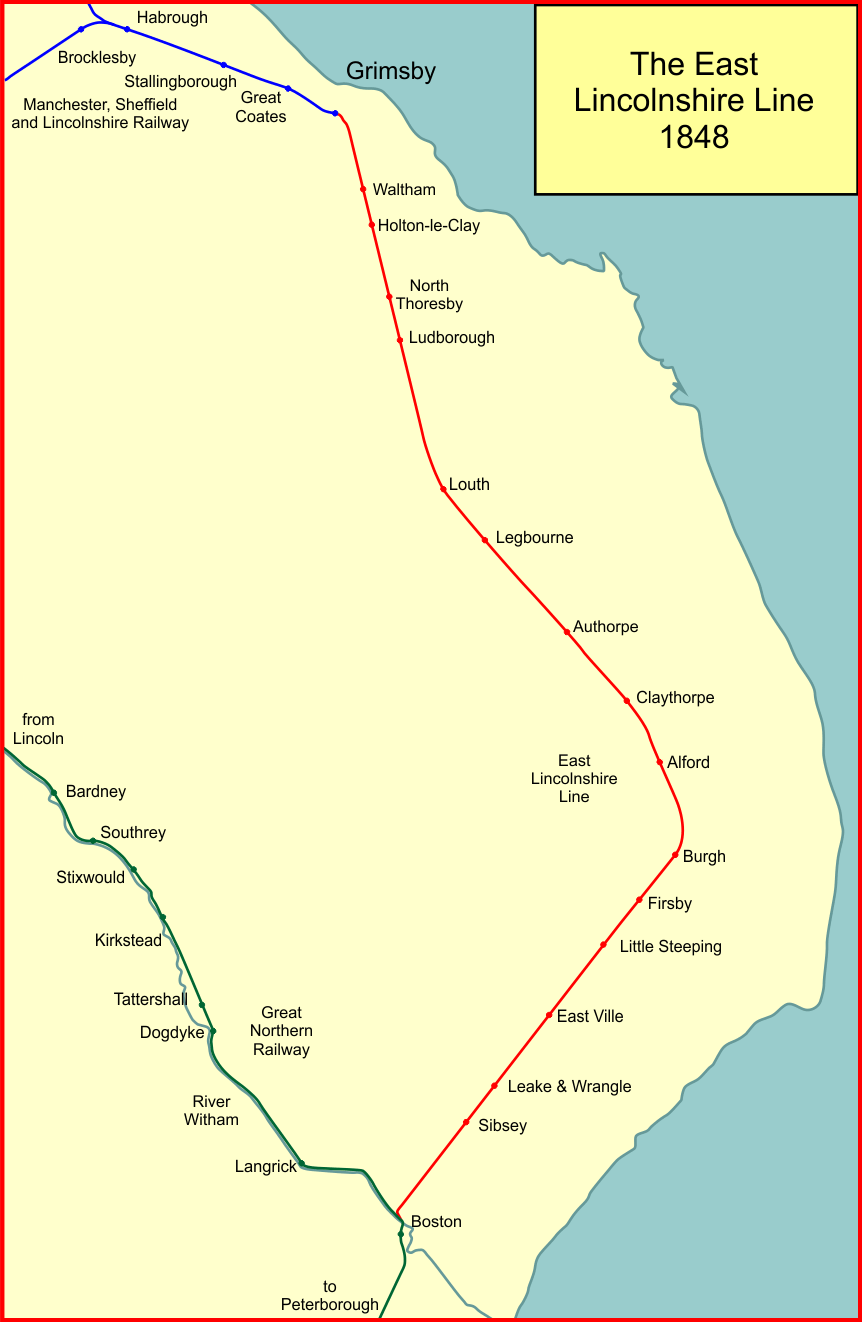
- Industry: Railway Company
- Founded: 26 June 1846
- Successor: Great Northern Railway

The East Lincolnshire Railway was a main line railway linking the towns of Boston, Alford, Louth and Grimsby in Lincolnshire, England. It opened in 1848. The ELR Company had leased the line to the Great Northern Railway, and it was the latter which constructed the line and operated it, as its East Lincolnshire Line.

As the Great Northern Railway completed its network, the East Lincolnshire Line formed a main line to Louth and Grimsby. In the latter decades of the nineteenth century seaside leisure pursuits became important, and the line became the trunk route supporting branches to Skegness, Sutton on Sea and Mablethorpe. Agricultural produce was important throughout the life of the line.

As road transport became more convenient, the line lost custom, and in 1970 it closed except for the portion from Boston to Firsby, which supported the Skegness branch, which continued in use. All intermediate stations on the ELR, and all of the route from Firsby to Grimsby were closed to passengers in 1970.

== Authorisation ==
East Lincolnshire Railway Act 1846
- Act of Parliament
- Parliament of the United Kingdom
- Long title: An Act for making a Railway from Great Grimsby by Louth and Alford to Boston, all in the County of Lincoln, to be called "The East Lincolnshire Railway."
- Citation: 9 & 10 Vict. c. lxxxviii

Dates
- Royal assent: 26 June 1846

The East Lincolnshire Railway was authorised by the East Lincolnshire Railway Act 1846 (9 & 10 Vict. c. lxxxviii) of 26 June 1846, with permitted share capital of £600,000. The authorisation was to build a 47 1/2 mile line built from its own terminus at Pasture Street in Great Grimsby to Boston, where it was to join the Loop Line (Note: or "Lincolnshire Loop" or just the "Loop".) of the Great Northern Railway, which had been authorised the same day. The potentially much larger Great Northern Railway immediately entered negotiations to lease the East Lincolnshire Railway. The GNR's purpose was to secure territory to itself, and it did so by acquiring, by lease or by purchase, authorised lines in areas it sought to control. The GNR took the East Lincolnshire Railway on a lease at 6% of its paid-up capital, an arrangement described as "somewhat improvident".

This lease was made immediately after the authorisation of the two lines, and was renewed later as a lease for 1,000 years. The East Lincolnshire Railway Company was from that time a financial shell, only concerned with distributing the lease charge of £3,600 annually to shareholders.

East Lincolnshire Railway (Branch to Great Grimsby and Sheffield Junction Railway at Grimsby) Act 1847
- Act of Parliament
- Parliament of the United Kingdom
- Long title: An Act to amend the East Lincolnshire Railway Act, 1846, and to authorize the Construction of a Branch Railway to join the Great Grimsby and Sheffield Junction Railway near Grimsby.
- Citation: 10 & 11 Vict. c. cxxv

Dates
- Royal assent: 2 July 1847

Originally the ELR had intended to provide its own terminus at Pasture Street in Grimsby, but the GNR agreed with the Great Grimsby and Sheffield Junction Railway to use its Grimsby station. The following year on 2 July 1847 a further act of Parliament, the East Lincolnshire Railway (Branch to Great Grimsby and Sheffield Junction Railway at Grimsby) Act 1847 (10 & 11 Vict. c. cxxv) authorised the ELR to build a branch half a mile in length to make the connection to the GG&SJR. The Great Grimsby and Sheffield Junction Railway Company soon merged with others and became the Manchester, Sheffield and Lincolnshire Railway. Further share capital of £10,000 was authorised. A further act of Parliament of 9 July 1847, the Great Northern Railway Company's Purchase Act 1847 (10 & 11 Vict. c. cxlviii) authorised the acquisition of the East Lincolnshire Railway Company by the Great Northern Railway, although this was not acted on.

It was the Great Northern Railway which built, and later, operated the line. Most of its extent was a perfectly straight line with no heavy cuttings. There were ten bridges, three over the line and seven under the line. The contractors were Waring and Sons of Louth. The architects of the station buildings were John Grey Weightman and Matthew Ellison Hadfield of Sheffield.

== Opening ==
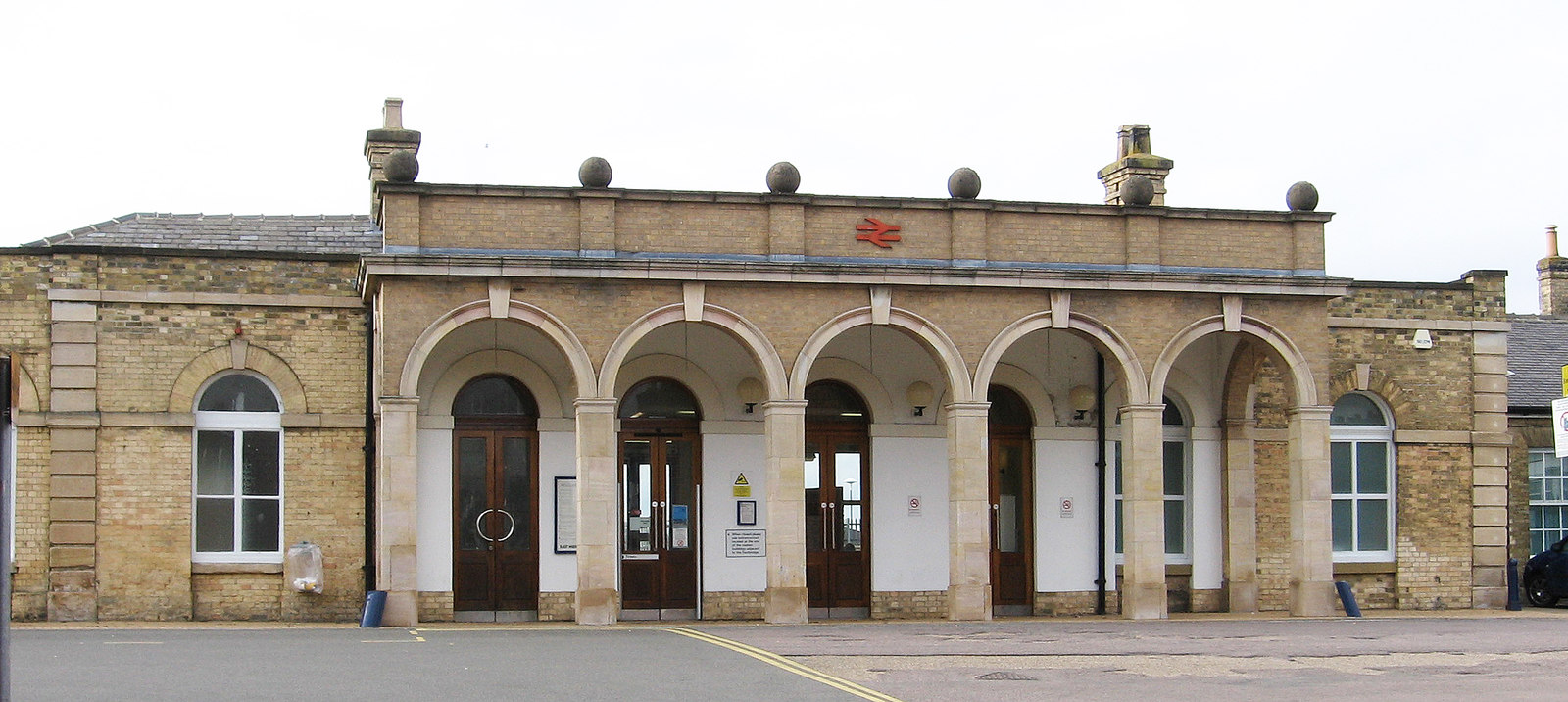
Boston station frontage

The 14-mile section between Louth and Grimsby opened on 1 March 1848. The Manchester, Sheffield and Lincolnshire Railway opened its line from Grimsby to New Holland on the same day. The MS&LR and the GNR both used the Grimsby station; the MS&LR and GNR arranged to run over each other's lines. The original passenger service was five trains each way on weekdays over the 30 miles between Louth and New Holland, with two trains each way on Sundays. New Holland was the ferry terminal for Hull.

Later that year, the East Lincolnshire Line was further extended southward, from Louth to Firsby (at that time spelt Firstby). This opened on 3 September 1848, and on 2 October 1848 the line was opened from Firsby to a temporary station at Boston; the entire East Lincolnshire Railway authorised system was now complete.

== GNR Loop Line ==
Work had been proceeding on the GNR Loop Line, and the 58 miles from near Peterborough through Boston to Lincoln opened on 17 October 1848. That line was double except for a mile at Boston immediately south of the junction of the East Lincolnshire Line and the Loop Line. This was awkwardly squeezed in between houses at Witham Town and the River Witham, on the north approach to the skew bridge over the Grand Sluice. It was soon realised that this was not proper, and the section was made double track by a deviation (to the other side of the houses) on 11 May 1850; the point of junction of the East Lincolnshire Line was shifted slightly as well.

These line openings enabled through journeys to be made to London from Lincolnshire and from Hull (by ferry to New Holland), using the Eastern Counties Railway or the London and North Western Railway from Peterborough southwards.

== Connecting lines ==
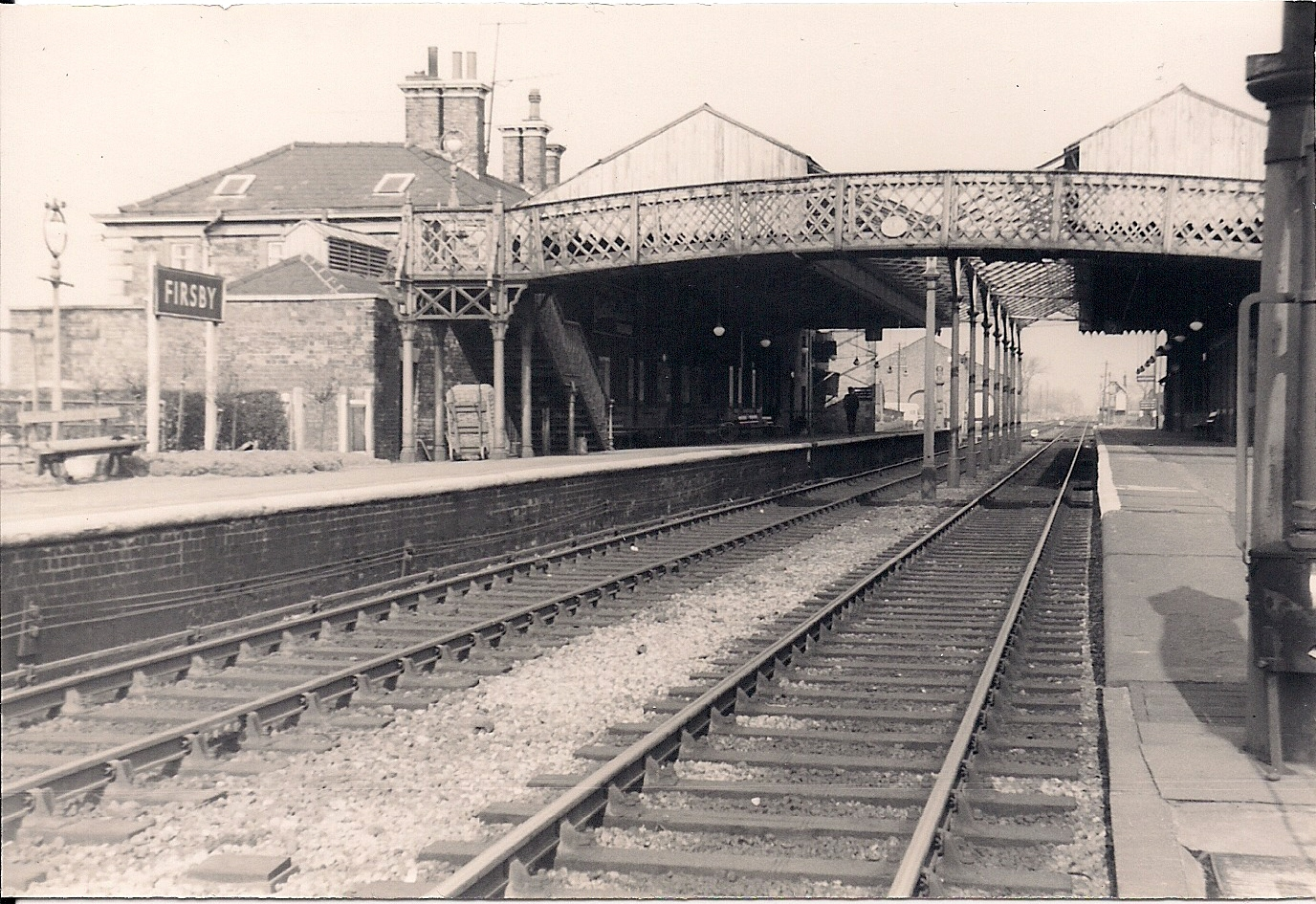
Firsby railway station

The East Lincolnshire Line formed a spine from which a number of branch lines diverged. Its straight course led it to by-pass several important towns, and the development of seaside holidays and excursions from the 1860s generated a demand for easier transport links.

Geographically from south to north, these were:

=== Spilsby branch ===
Spilsby was a significant market town, and a branch line from the East Lincolnshire Line at Firsby was promoted locally. It opened in 1868. Although the branch line was busy enough, servicing loans taken out during the construction period was perpetually problematical, and in 1891 the Great Northern Railway purchased the company. The passenger service was suspended in 1939 as a war economy, and never reinstated; the line closed completely in 1958.

=== Wainfleet and Skegness ===
The East Lincolnshire Railway followed a direct path to Grimsby, and in doing so passed by the coastal towns. As seaside holidays became popular in the third quarter of the nineteenth century, these towns realised that they suffered from not having a good railway connection, and in some cases set about rectifying the matter. The Wainfleet and Firsby Railway was authorised by the Wainfleet and Firsby Railway Act 1869 (32 & 33 Vict. c. v) to build from Firsby on the East Lincolnshire Line to Wainfleet, which was a semi-defunct port halfway to Skegness. It opened in 1871, and road transport completed the journey to Skegness. This wasn't satisfactory either, and in 1873 a line from Wainfleet to Skegness completed the branch line.

The junction at Firsby faced away from the most important traffic, and a west to south curve was installed in 1881. The Skegness branch carried a very heavy holiday traffic.

=== Mablethorpe and Sutton on Sea ===
Like Skegness, Mablethorpe developed as a seaside resort for excursionists and holidaymakers. A branch line was opened by the Louth and East Coast Railway in 1877. Sutton le Marsh, a few miles to the south, was also popular, and the Sutton and Willoughby Railway and Dock company opened a branch line in 1886, and used the pleasanter name Sutton on Sea for the resort. This line was more practical, as it was south-facing, enabling an easier approach for the holiday trains. A major part of the Sutton and Willoughby Railway and Dock was the construction of a fishing harbour to rival Grimsby, but the company never generated enough money to attempt the dock. (Later on, other companies promised to open it, but they also failed.) The distance between Sutton and Mablethorpe was not great and the company decided to build a railway to fill the gap; that opened in 1888. This had the effect that the holiday trains nearly all approached Mablethorpe by running through (and calling at) Sutton.

The Sutton and Willoughby company was absorbed by the Great Northern Railway in 1902, followed by the Louth and East Coast Railway in 1908.

=== Louth to Bardney Line ===
The Louth to Bardney line was planned to run to Five Mile House, near Lincoln, and provide a through run between Lincoln and Grimsby, also connecting (as yet unproven) ironstone resources. The line was cut back for lack of money, and opened to Bardney in stages between 1874 and 1882. The hoped-for through trunk traffic did not appear, and the ironstone was available in small quantities only. The line remained a penniless local line. It was reluctantly purchased by the Great Northern Railway in 1883.It closed to passengers in 1951, and completely in 1960.

=== Kirkstead and Little Steeping Railway ===
As holiday traffic to East Coast resorts became dominant, the roundabout route from the Midlands and Northern population centres to Skegness via Boston (reversing direction there) became increasingly an irritation. In 1911 the GNR decided to build the New Line, between junctions east of Kirkstead and west of Little Steeping. The line was 15 miles long, and it opened in 1913. Much of the holiday traffic was diverted over it; its local traffic was modest, and confined to agricultural business.

== Railmotors ==
The long and thinly populated tract of the East Lincolnshire Line led the directors to consider how passenger operation might be made cheaper. In the early years of the twentieth century, a number of railway companies experimented with railmotors. These were self-contained passenger coaches which had a small integrated steam locomotive. Central retractable steps enabled passengers to board and alight from simple platforms at ground level. In 1905, such a service was started between Louth and Grimsby, and a number of new halts were opened: (Fotherby Halt, Utterby Halt, Grainsby Halt, Holton Village Halt, Weelsby Road Halt and Hainton Street Halt).

The railmotors had mixed success; their limited passenger capacity led to problems at busy times; and they were incapable of hauling a tail load of any great weight.

== Commercial results ==
The East Lincolnshire Railway company had promoted the construction of the line to connect Grimsby to Boston. It was fortuitous that the Great Northern Railway built an important route through Boston, giving useful connectivity to the East Lincolnshire Line, as it became. Nevertheless, the intervening terrain was largely rural and very thinly populated. Trunk passenger travel from Grimsby to London was not enough to sustain the line. The development of Skegness, Mablethorpe and Sutton on Sea brought a huge and unforeseen volume of traffic to the relevant parts of the line, and indeed at the peaks overwhelmed the capacity of terminals to handle the traffic.

When passenger and goods transport by road became practicable and convenient in the 1920s and after, the use of the line gradually declined accordingly, and there was a possibility in the early 1960s that the whole network, including the Skegness branch, might close. Protests had an effect, but only a delaying effect in general.

== Closure ==
The line was recommended for partial closure in the 1963 Beeching Report as it was not felt to be economically viable. The closure went through two public enquiries before being approved at the end of the decade. The final decision was to retain services between Boston and Skegness, and retain the remainder of the line for freight. The passenger service throughout the East Lincolnshire Line and all branches was closed on 5 October 1970, with the exception of Boston - Skegness. A special train ran that evening, with 1,000 spectators at Louth station.

Skegness was to continue to be served by train from Boston via the 1881 curve at Firsby. All the stations on the original East Lincolnshire Line closed, but the Skegness trains traversed the line from the site of the former junction at Boston to Firsby South, and then over the Skegness branch. In addition the section from Grimsby to Louth remained in use for goods trains to Associated British Maltsters at Louth, but this ceased in December 1980. The line was offered to the Grimsby to Louth Preservation Society to run as a heritage railway, but they could not afford the £400,000 required. A special passenger train ran over the line before it was lifted.

=== Restoring Your Railway ===
In March 2021, two bids were submitted to restore the line from Louth to Firsby and the line from Mablethorpe to Firsby as part of the third round of the Restoring Your Railway fund.

== Preservation group ==
The Lincolnshire Wolds Railway now operates a heritage railway system. It owns the five miles of trackbed from its present terminus at Ludborough to the Fairfield Industrial Estate at Louth, where a substantial site for a new station has been set aside.

== Station list ==
- Grimsby; opened 1 March 1848; renamed Grimsby Town 1900; still open;
- Garden Street Crossing;
- Grimsby Goods Junction;
- Hainton Street Halt; opened 11 December 1905; closed 11 September 1961;
- Weelsby Road Halt; opened 11 December 1905; closed 1 January 1940;
- Waltham; opened 1 March 1848; closed 11 September 1961;
- Holton Village Halt; opened 11 December 1905; closed 11 September 1961;
- Holton-le-Clay; opened 1 March 1848; closed 4 July 1955;
- Grainsby Halt; opened 11 December 1905; closed after October 1939;
- North Thoresby; opened 1 March 1848; closed 5 October 1970;
- Ludborough; opened 1 March 1848; closed 11 September 1961;
- Utterby Halt; opened 11 December 1905; closed 11 September 1961;
- Fotherby; opened 11 December 1905; closed 11 September 1961;
- Fotherby Gatehouse; opened September 1863; closed October 1872;
- Louth; opened 1 March 1848; closed 5 October 1970;
- Legbourne; opened 3 September 1848; renamed Legbourne Road 1880; closed 7 December 1953;
- Authorpe; opened 3 September 1848; closed 11 September 1961;
- Claythorpe; opened 3 September 1848; renamed Aby 1885; closed 11 September 1961;
- Alford Town; opened 3 September 1848; renamed Alford Town 1923; closed 5 October 1970;
- Willoughby; opened 3 September 1848; relocated 4 October 1886; closed 5 October 1970;
- Burgh; opened 3 September 1848; renamed Burgh-le-Marsh 1923; closed 5 October 1970;
- Firstby; opened 3 September 1848; soon renamed Firsby; closed 5 October 1970;
- Little Steeping; opened 2 October 1848; closed 11 September 1961;
- East Ville; opened 2 October 1848; closed 11 September 1961;
- Hob Hole, Leake and Wrangle; opened 2 October 1848; renamed Old Leake and Wrangle 1852; closed 17 September 1956;
- Sibsey; opened 2 October 1848; closed 11 September 1961;
- East Lincoln Junction; or Grand Sluice Junction;
- Boston; opened 2 October 1848; still open.
