= Grimsby Town railway station =

Railway station in North East Lincolnshire, England

Grimsby Town
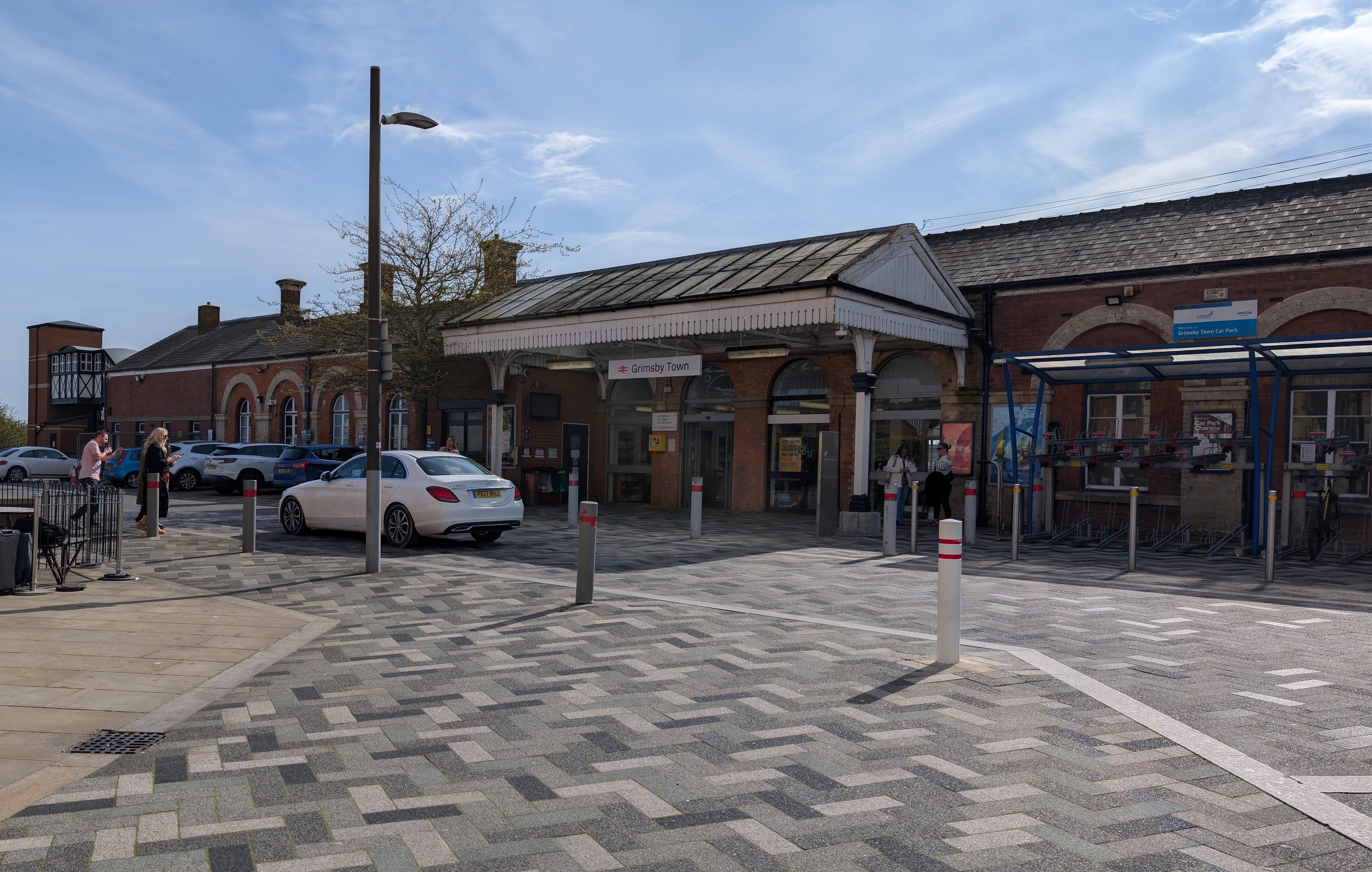
- The station forecourt and entrance.

General information
- Location: Grimsby, North East Lincolnshire; England
- Coordinates: 53.56355°N 0.08700°W
- Grid reference: TA267091
- Manager: TransPennine Express
- Platforms: 3
- Train operators: TransPennine Express; East Midlands Railway; Northern Trains

Construction
- Parking: Paid car park available (59 spaces, 4 accessible)
- Accessible: Yes

Other information
- Station code: GMB
- Classification: DfT category D

History
- Opened: 29 February 1848
- Original company: Great Grimsby and Sheffield Junction Railway
- Pre-grouping: Great Central Railway
- Post-grouping: London and North Eastern Railway

Passengers
- 2020/21: ▼98,534
- Interchange: ▼2,301
- 2021/22: ▲0.318 million
- Interchange: ▲13,676
- 2022/23: ▼0.316 million
- Interchange: ▲14,427
- 2023/24: ▲0.386 million
- Interchange: ▲15,994
- 2024/25: ▲0.439 million
- Interchange: ▲20,434
Location
Notes
- Passenger statistics from the Office of Rail & Road

Grimsby Town railway station serves the town of Grimsby in North East Lincolnshire, England. It is operated on a daily basis by TransPennine Express, and is also served by East Midlands Railway and Northern Trains services. The station is located on the South Humberside Main Line, which runs between Cleethorpes and Doncaster, and is part of the South TransPennine Route.

== History ==
Grimsby Town was opened on 29 February 1848, when the Manchester, Sheffield and Lincolnshire Railway opened its line from New Holland to Grimsby. It also served as the terminus of the later East Lincolnshire Railway to Boston, until the closure of the ELR line to passengers in October 1970 following the Beeching cuts.

On 13 November 1907 a fireman was killed in an accident at the station: while oiling his locomotive, five trucks were shunted on to the end of the train. The impact sent the train forward and the fireman was trapped in the machinery. He could not be rescued without the engine being reversed and backed to its original place, and this action resulted in him being mangled in the machinery and he was killed.

In a collision on 15 July 1930, 32 people were injured when a train from New Holland crashed into an express train from Sheffield which was stationary in Grimsby Station.

The station's main roof, covering Platforms 1 and 2, was renewed from its original as-built form in 1978.

The station was substantially refurbished by then-franchise owners First TransPennine Express between 2007 and 2008, which involved the internal refurbishment of the ticket office and waiting areas, and the installation of updated departure boards and customer information screens, and a new 'ATOS Anne' public address system.

In 2011 an overbridge was added to the eastern side of the station between platforms 1 and 2, which was opened by then-Great Grimsby MP Austin Mitchell on 19 July that year.

=== The Yarborough Hotel ===
The Yarborough Hotel, adjacent to the station building, was constructed in 1851 to serve the railway; and takes its name from the Earl of Yarborough, who was a director of the railway company. The hotel opened with the promise of being 'replete with every accommodation' and offering 'warm, cold and shower baths'. It is now owned and operated as a pub, restaurant and hotel by JD Wetherspoon.

== Station facilities ==
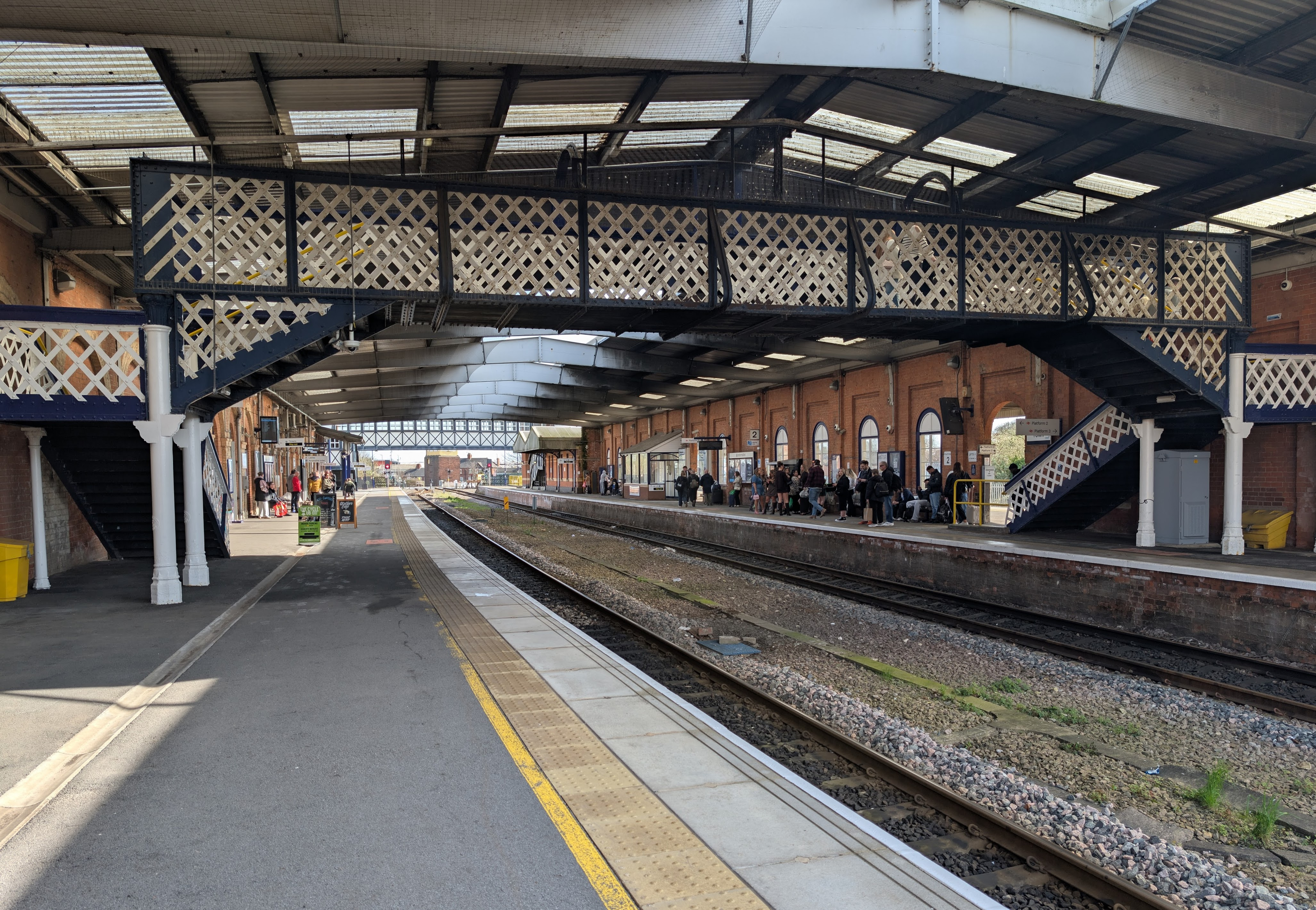
Platforms 1 and 2.

Grimsby Town has three platforms, all of which can be accessed via step-free means.

- Platform 1 adjoins the station's staffed ticket office, and is used by eastbound trains terminating at Cleethorpes.
- Platform 2 is used by westbound trains, and features a small waiting room.
- Platform 3 is a terminal platform on the southern face of the station. It is used only by East Midlands Railway trains in the early morning.

The station features an independent café adjacent to the ticket office and main waiting room. A self-service ticket machine is available on Platform 1 for purchasing tickets and collecting pre-paid tickets, and customer help points are available on Platforms 1 and 2. The station also features an exterior cycle rack, complemented by a not-for-profit indoor bicycle parking and repair facility at the Cycle Hub (formerly the station's parcels office), which is accessible both from the station forecourt and the station interior.

24/7 car parking is available in the station car park. The station is also part of the PlusBus scheme which, when purchased along with a train ticket, permits unlimited use of Stagecoach buses in the Grimsby and Cleethorpes urban area.

== Services ==
Services at Grimsby Town are operated by TransPennine Express, East Midlands Railway, and Northern Trains. Effective December 2025:

- TransPennine Express operate an hourly service calling at Grimsby Town, travelling between Cleethorpes and Liverpool Lime Street, which uses Class 185 DMU trains.
- East Midlands Railway operate two services which call at Grimsby Town, both of which are two-hourly (one train every two hours) and use Class 170 and Class 158 DMU trains. One service travels between Cleethorpes and Matlock, and one service travels between Cleethorpes and Barton-on-Humber; during the winter months, neither service operates on Sundays.
- Northern Trains operate a single train per weekday between Cleethorpes and Sheffield, using Class 150 DMU trains; which calls at Grimsby Town once in the morning while en-route to Cleethorpes, and once in the afternoon while en-route to Sheffield.

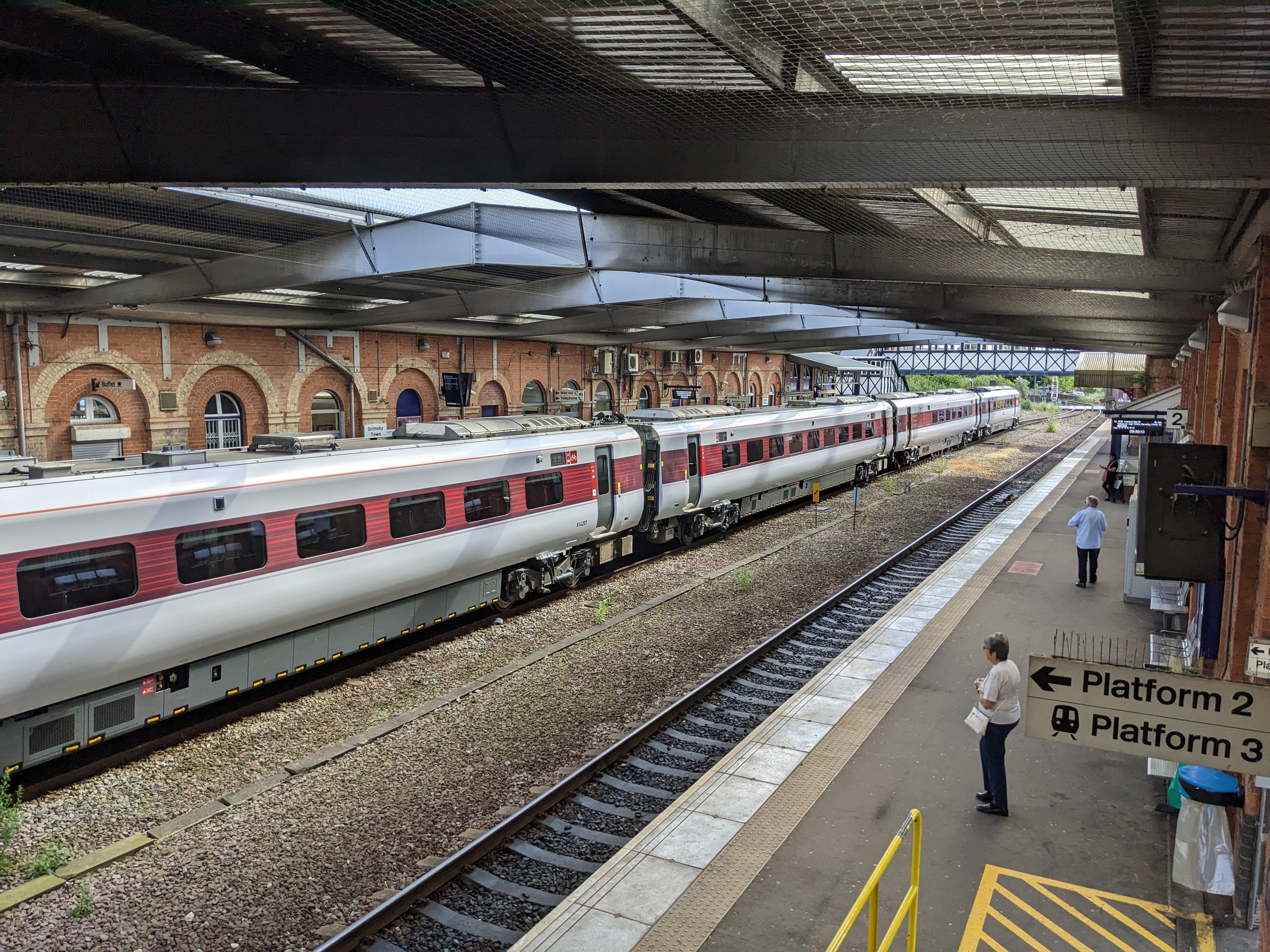
An LNER train sits on Platform 1, during a test run on 26 June 2023.

Prior to 1982, Grimsby Town was served by four direct trains per day to and from London King's Cross, featuring buffet and dining car services. From 1982, the four daily services were replaced with a single InterCity 125 train, which arrived in London at approximately 09:00 and returned to Grimsby in the evening. This direct service to London was withdrawn altogether in May 1993, just prior to the privatisation of British Rail.

LNER intended to commence direct services between Cleethorpes and London (via Lincoln) in December 2024, calling at Grimsby Town, using bi-mode Class 800 trains. A test train called at Grimsby Town on 26 June 2023; however, despite substantial local support, as of October 2024 plans were described as being 'on hold', and in March 2026 it was confirmed that this service 'could not be funded at the current time' due to the cost of station improvements required at Market Rasen.

=== Proposed future services ===
In March 2025, Grand Central applied for permission to operate trains between Cleethorpes and London King's Cross (via Scunthorpe) 'from as early as December 2026', should permission be granted. This proposed service would consist of four new return services per day, formed by the extension of existing Grand Central services which call at Doncaster. Following 'extended discussions' with Network Rail it was reported that, should permission be granted to operate, Class 180 DMU trains would be used until brand-new Class 820 tri-mode (diesel/electric/battery) trains could be brought into service in 2028.

In October 2026, Grand Central confirmed that the application to operate trains between Cleethorpes and London King's Cross had been withdrawn, saying that this was 'no longer commercially viable'.

Preceding station	National Rail	Following station
Great Coates	East Midlands Railway Barton line	Grimsby Docks
Habrough	East Midlands Railway Grimsby–Lincoln–Newark line	Terminus
Habrough	East Midlands Railway Grimsby–Lincoln–Newark line	Cleethorpes
Habrough	TransPennine Express: South Humberside Main Line; (South TransPennine)	Cleethorpes
Barnetby	Northern Trains Brigg Branch Line Limited Service	Cleethorpes
	Disused railways	
Terminus	Great Northern Railway East Lincolnshire Railway	Hainton Street Halt Line and station closed
