= List of public art in Nottinghamshire =

This is a list of public art in the Nottinghamshire county of England. This list applies only to works of public art on permanent display in an outdoor public space. For example, this does not include artworks in museums.

== Rest of Nottinghamshire ==
The list can be sorted by clicking on the corresponding arrows in the column titles.

Image	Title / subject	Location and coordinates	Date	Artist / designer	Type	Material	Dimensions	Designation	Owner / administrator	Wikidata	Notes
	Female Satyr Statue	Newstead Abbey 53°4′43.255″N 1°11′24.799″W	Early 18th century	John Nost (probable)	Statue	Ashlar and lead	2 metres (6 ft 7 in) high	Grade II		Q26521431	
	Male Satyr Statue	Newstead Abbey 53°4′41.671″N 1°11′25.098″W	Early 18th century	John Nost (probable)	Statue	Ashlar and lead	2 metres (6 ft 7 in) high	Grade II		Q26521432	
	Monument to a Horse	Worksop Road, Edwinstowe 53°12′27.014″N 1°2′39.311″W	1834		Monument			Grade II		Q26297564	Doric column on a square pedestal.
More images	Cavendish Monument	Market Place, Mansfield 53°8′39.480″N 1°11′47.436″W	1849	T. C. Hine	Monument			Grade II*		Q17547529	Memorial to Lord George Bentinck.
	Hope Memorial	Broadgate Park, Beeston 52°55′42.524″N 1°12′36.623″W	1903	A. Marshall	Memorial	Portland stone		Grade II		Q26540177	A memorial to the fallen of the Boer War. The female figure represents "hope".
More images	Kimberley War Memorial	Main Street, Kimberley 52°59′48.444″N 1°15′18.176″W	1921		Memorial	Stone		Grade II		Q26567387	A memorial to both World Wars.
More images	Retford War Memorial	Market Place, Retford 53°19′21.860″N 0°56′35.185″W	1921	Leonard W. Barnard	Monument			Grade II*		Q26263538	Unveiled by Sir Frederick Milner.
More images	Worksop War Memorial	Memorial Avenue, Worksop 53°18′14.832″N 1°7′9.188″W	1925	A. H. Richardson	Monument			Grade II*		Q26263405	Unveiled by General Sir Horace Smith-Dorrien.
More images	The Beeston Seat	High Road, Beeston 52.92768°N 1.21428°W	1987	Sioban Coppinger	Sculpture	Bronze, Reinforced concrete			Broxtowe Borough Council		
	Robin Hood and Little John	Swinecote Road, Edwinstowe 53°12′10.7″N 1°03′49.8″W	1988	Graham Ibbeson	Statue	Bronze			Nottinghamshire County Council		Showing the first time Robin Hood meets Little John.
	The Oil Patch Warrior	Rufford Country Park, Ollerton	1991	Jay O'Meilia	Statue	Bronze	2.14 metres (7 ft 0 in) high		Parkwood Outdoor		Commemorating the site of secret Second World War oil wells, drilled by American oil workers to assist Britain’s war effort.
	Robin Hood and Maid Marian	High Street, Edwinstowe 53°11′38.6″N 1°03′51.6″W	1998	Neale Andrew	Statue	Bronze			Nottinghamshire County Council		
More images	Golden Hand	Vicar Water Country Park, Clipstone 53°09′38.1″N 1°06′33.1″W	c. 2000	Bank	Sculpture		3.04 metres (10.0 ft) high				Inscription: "Let not the toil of our forebears be forgotten but let it be reborn in new industry...."
	Three Cricketers	Near the library, Kirkby-in-Ashfield 53.09955°N 1.24390°W	2002, 2015	Neale Andrew and David Annand	Statues	Bronze			Ashfield District Council		Harold Larwood, William Voce (both born near here), and Donald Bradman, shown in the bodyline series of 1932–1933 in Australia.
	Gateway Sculpture	Entrance to Meadow Park, East Leake 52.83256°N 1.18055°W	2003	Xceptional Designs	Sculpture						The centrepiece is a millstone, found nearby in 2000.
More images	Testing for Gas	Silverhill Wood Country Park, Sutton-in-Ashfield 53°09′25.6″N 1°17′24.0″W	2004	Antony Dufort	Statue	Bronze and stone			Nottinghamshire County Council		Commissioned to commemorate the Nottinghamshire mining industry
	The Miners Memorial	Station Road, Hucknall 53.03774°N 1.19900°W	2005	Graham Ibbeson	Statue	Bronze and sandstone	6 metres (20 ft) high		Ashfield District Council		Commemorates the people who worked at Hucknall No. 2 Colliery.
	Girl Guiding Nottinghamshire's Centenary Seat	Rufford Country Park, Ollerton 53°10′32.1″N 1°02′03.1″W	2010	Gwen Heeney	Sculpture	Stone			Parkwood Outdoor		A large settee and two chairs, made of oversize bricks, are arranged in a trefoil, the symbol of the guiding movement.
	The Royalist Cannon	Sconce and Devon Park, Newark-on-Trent 53°04′05.7″N 0°49′16.3″W	2012	Michael Condron	Sculpture	Weathering steel			Newark and Sherwood District Council		Commemorating Newark's role in the Civil War.
	The Fruit Gatherers	Rufford Country Park, Ollerton 53°10′33.6″N 1°02′09.6″W		Peter Randall-Page	Sculpture	Stone			Parkwood Outdoor		Inspired by a photograph depicting three Saguro women carrying baskets on their heads.
	Two Civil War soldiers	Outside the library, Newark-on-Trent 53.074376°N 0.807941°W			Statue						
