= George Best (disambiguation) =

George Best (1946–2005) was a Northern Irish international footballer.

George Best may also refer to:

== People ==
- George Best (MP) (1759–1818), MP for Rochester, UK
- George Best (priest) (c. 1793–1829), Canadian clergyman
- George Best (chronicler) (died 1584), chronicler of Frobisher's sea voyages
- George A. Best, English early 20th century football goalkeeper
- George Newton Best (1846–1926), American bryologist
- George Best (bowls) (1911–1994), Northern Irish bowls player and Linfield F.C. president

== Other uses ==
- George Bestial, a character in Viz magazine
- George Best (album), a 1987 album by The Wedding Present
- "George Best – A Tribute", a 2005 single by Brian Kennedy and Peter Corry

== See also ==
- George Best Belfast City Airport
