= Listed buildings in Worksop =

Worksop is a market town in the Bassetlaw District of Nottinghamshire, England. The town contains over 100 listed buildings that are recorded in the National Heritage List for England. Of these, four are listed at Grade I, the highest of the three grades, five are at Grade II*, the middle grade, and the others are at Grade II, the lowest grade. The most important listed buildings are a former priory, later a parish church, the gatehouse to the priory, a lodge, and a country house, which are listed at Grade I, and structures associated with them are also listed. Most of the other listed buildings include houses, cottages and associated structures, shops, offices, farmhouses and farm buildings, public houses and hotels, public buildings and churches. The rest of the listed buildings include a market cross, a canal lock, schools, a bank, a railway station and a signal box, a pumping station, war memorials and a telephone kiosk.

== Key ==
Grade	Criteria
I	Buildings of exceptional interest, sometimes considered to be internationally important
II*	Particularly important buildings of more than special interest
II	Buildings of national importance and special interest

== Buildings ==
Name and location	Photograph	Date	Notes	Grade
Worksop Priory; 53.30382°N 1.11572°W		11th century	An Augustinian priory, later a parish church, it has been altered and extended through the centuries. The church was restored in 1846–49, in 1920–22 Harold Brakspear restored the Lady chapel as a war memorial, and in 1933–35 he added the north transept, and in 1970–74 Lawrence King added a tower at the crossing, a sanctuary, and the east end. The church is built in stone with slate roofs, and has two towers at the west end, a nave with a clerestory, north and south aisles, a north porch with offices, a south porch, north and south transepts, a crossing tower, and an east end with a Lady chapel and a sanctuary. The west doorway is Norman and has a shaft with waterleaf capitals and a moulded head with a hood mould. Adjoining the north porch are the remains of the cloister wall containing round-headed and four-centred arched doorways.	I
Priory Cross; 53.30276°N 1.11640°W		13th century	A market cross that was moved to its present site in front of Worksop Priory Gatehouse in 1898. The cross has an octagonal base of five steps and a plinth, on which stands an octagonal shaft.	II
Worksop Priory Gatehouse; 53.30289°N 1.11626°W		14th century	The gateway to the priory, which has been restored, is in stone on a moulded plinth, with bands, four buttresses, and a pantile roof with coped gables. There are two storeys and three bays. The middle bay is gabled, and contains an archway with a moulded surround, shafts with moulded capitals, and a hood mould. Above the arch is a six-light window with a segmental head, flanked by gabled crocketed niches containing statues, over which is a niche containing a seated female figure, and a roundel. Projecting from the right bay is the shrine chapel with gargoyles, and a quatrefoil-pierced moulded gabled parapet.	I
The Old Ship Inn; 53.30116°N 1.12467°W		1525–30	The inn, on a corner site, was extended to the rear in 1938. It is timber framed and rendered, with pantile roofs. There are two storeys and attics, an east front of two gabled bays, and a canted bay on the corner. Projecting from the right bay is an oriel window, and there is a later oriel window in the corner bay. The windows are casements. The later wing has two storeys and three bays, the ground floor is in stone, and the upper floor is timber framed.	II*
Gateford Hall; 53.32783°N 1.14632°W	—	16th century	The house, on a moated site, has a timber framed core, it was encased in stone in the 17th century, and has since been restored. There are two storeys and attics, five bays, and a pantile roof. The south front has a doorway and sash windows. Elsewhere, there is a later doorway in the east front, casement windows, a mullioned cellar window, and a horizontally-sliding sash.	II*
Manor Lodge; 53.30670°N 1.15370°W		c. 1590	Probably originally a hunting lodge, it has been much altered. The house is in stone on a chamfered plinth, with quoins, moulded floor bands, moulded eaves, a parapet and a stone slate roof. There are five storeys and attics, and a cruciform plan. The house contains large mullioned and transomed windows, smaller mullioned windows, and some sash windows, one of which has a round-arched head, a moulded surround and blank shields in the spandrels.	I
106, 108 and 110 Bridge Street; 53.30208°N 1.12482°W		17th century	A row of houses that were altered in 1745, refronted in the 19th century, and later used as shops. They are rendered and colourwashed, and have stone dressings, rusticated quoins and lintels, a floor band moulded architraves, and a moulded eaves band. The left three bays have modillion eaves, the other bays have a coped parapet, and there is a slate roof with a shaped coped gable on the left, and a plain coped gable on the right. There are three storeys and attics, and eight bays. In the ground floor is a five-bay 20th-century shop front, to its right is a carriage entry with a rusticated surround, and another shop front. In the upper floors, the left three bays contain casement windows, and in the roof is a dormer, and in the other bays are sash windows. Inside the roof are cruck trusses.	II
Lion Vaults; 53.30194°N 1.12502°W	—	17th century	A building with a timber framed core, encased in stone and brick and rendered, with a slate roof. There is a single storey, and the building contains doorways with fanlights, and sash windows.	II
38 Church Walk; 53.30634°N 1.12163°W	—	Late 17th century	The house is in stone, with quoins, and a tile roof with coped gables. There are two storeys, an L-shaped plan, a parallel rear range and a rear wing. At the front are three bays, the middle bay projecting and containing a doorway with a moulded surround and a pediment. This is flanked by bow windows, above the doorway is a fixed light, and in the outer bays are casement windows with chamfered surrounds.	II
Gateford Farm House and farm buildings 53.32767°N 1.13712°W	—	c. 1700	The older part of the house is at the rear, with the front range dating from the 18th century. This is in chequered brick, with floor bands, dentilled eaves and a hipped pantile roof. There are three storeys and five bays. In the centre is a doorway with pilasters and a pediment, and the windows are sashes, those in the upper floor with segmental heads. At the rear are service wings, and a range of farm buildings with two storeys and three bays.	II
Worksop Manor and stables 53.29588°N 1.14653°W		1701–04	A country house, redesigned in 1763 by James Paine, and altered later, it is in stone with hipped slate roofs. The buildings are arranged around a quadrangle, with a screen wall to the west. There are two and three storeys and attics, and ranges of about 25 by 14 bays. In the centre of the east range is a round-arched gateway with pilasters and a moulded lintel. This is flanked by round windows and lean-to porches with Doric piers. Above is a pediment and a hexagonal bell turret with a ball finial. In the south range is the house that has three storeys, eleven bays, two-storey bay windows and sash windows. The west front contains a pavilion, an octastyle portal, and a gateway over which is a giant podium with a cornice and a heraldic lion.	I
Harness Grove House; 53.29639°N 1.16977°W	—	c. 1710	The house, with later alterations and additions, is in stone on a plinth, and has a hipped tile roof. There are two storeys and attics, and seven bays. The original five bays have corner pilasters, a central doorway and sash windows, and in the roof are three pedimented dormers. The extension to the right has a recessed bay and a two-storey bay window, and to the north is a porch with a Tudor arched doorway, flanking lancet windows, and an embattled parapet.	II
33, 35 and 35A Potter Street; 53.30229°N 1.12227°W		Early 18th century	A town house, later divided and used for other purposes, in stone on a plinth, with rusticated quoins, floor and eaves bands, moulded eaves, and a slate roof. There are two storeys and attics, seven bays, and a single-storey single-bay extension on the right. In the centre is a porch with Doric columns and a pediment within which are two panels with sash windows, flanked by doorways with pilasters, cornices and hoods. To the right are two casement windows, to the left and in the upper floor are sash windows, all with projecting architraves. In the roof are three dormers with pediments, the central segmental, the outer ones triangular. At the rear are two-storey canted bay windows, and a pedimented wing containing a French window, and a Diocletian window with a hood mould.	II
Park Cottage; 53.30226°N 1.13448°W		Early 18th century	A house that has been extended, it is in stone and brick, and has a pantile roof with a coped gable and kneelers. There are two storeys and an L-shaped plan, consisting of a front double-depth range and a long rear wing. On the front is a doorway with a moulded surround, to the left is a two-storey canted bay window, to the right are sash windows and above is a mullioned and transomed window. In the right gable end is a bay window and an oriel window. The rear wing has a projecting bay containing a doorway with a Gibbs surround, above which is a circular window and an elaborate wind vane.	II
86 Bridge Street; 53.30275°N 1.12480°W		18th century	A house to which a rear wing was added in the 19th century, and later used as a shop. It is in rendered brick with a coped parapet, and a roof of pantile and slate. There are three storeys and three bays. In the ground floor is a shop front, and an elliptical-arched carriage entry to the right. The middle floor contains sash windows and the top floor has casement windows, all with keystones.	II
130, 132 and 132a Bridge Street; 53.30132°N 1.12458°W		Mid 18th century	A row of houses, later shops, in red brick with stone dressings, a floor band and a pantile roof. There are three storeys and five bays. In the left bay is a round-headed carriage entry with imposts and a keystone, and to its right are 19th and 20th-century shop fronts. The upper floors contain sash windows with brick wedge lintels and stone keystones.	II
2 Newgate Street; 53.30071°N 1.12377°W	—	18th century	A cottage converted into a shop, it is in red brick, the ground floor stuccoed. It has a pantile roof, two storeys and three bays. In the ground floor is a doorway with plain jambs, to the right is a 19th-century shop window, and the upper floor contains sash windows.	II
13 and 15 Park Street; 53.30062°N 1.12384°W		18th century	A pair of cottages on a corner site, one later a shop, in brick on a plinth, with modillioned eaves and a pantile roof. There are two storeys, and a west front of four bays, the left bay gabled. On the front is a gabled porch with Doric columns, flanked by canted bay windows, and to the right is a doorway and a window, both with a segmental head. The upper floor contains sash windows, three of which are horizontally-sliding. In the left return is a 19th-century shop front.	II
17 Park Street; 53.30051°N 1.12381°W		18th century	The house is rendered and colourwashed, and has moulded eaves and a pantile roof. There are two storeys and three bays. The central doorway has a reeded surround and a moulded hood on curved brackets. To its left is a sash window, to the right is a casement window, and in the upper floor are horizontally-sliding sash windows.	II
33 Park Street; 53.29999°N 1.12365°W		Mid 18th century	A house in red brick on a rendered plinth, with a floor band and a slate roof. There are two storeys and attics, and an L-shaped plan, with a front of four bays, and a rear two-storey gabled stair turret. In the second bay is a doorway with a rectangular fanlight and a hood on scrolled brackets, and to the right is a round-arched passage entry. The windows are casements with rubbed brick heads, and in the roof are two gabled dormers.	II
29 Potter Street; 53.30219°N 1.12283°W		18th century	Two houses, later combined into one shop, it is in colourwashed brick on a rendered plinth, with a floor band, moulded eaves and a pantile roof. There are two storeys and attics, and two bays. In the centre are two doorways with keystones, the right one blocked with a window inserted, flanked by shop windows, and with an overall hood. The upper floor contains sash windows, and in the roof are two gabled dormers with horizontally-sliding sash windows.	II
Darfoulds Farm House; 53.29780°N 1.16788°W	—	18th century	The farmhouse, which was refronted in the 19th century and later altered, is in stone with a pantile roof. There are two storeys and an L-shaped plan, with a front of seven bays, and a three-bay rear wing. On the front is a gabled porch, and the windows are sashes in architraves.	II
Pigeoncote, Hawk's Nest Farm; 53.29151°N 1.15668°W	—	Mid 18th century	The pigeoncote is in brick, with a floor band, and a pantile roof with coped gables. There are two storeys and a square plan. In the ground floor is a single opening, and the gable ends contain square attic openings with wooden lintels.	II
Ivy House; 53.32764°N 1.13799°W		Mid 18th century	The house is in brick, the rear wall is in stone, and it has dentilled eaves and a pantile roof. There are two storeys, a double pile plan, and three bays. The central doorway has reeded pilasters and a dentilled cornice. Above it is a sash window, and the outer bays contain three-light casement windows; all the windows have segmental heads.	II
Part of Queen's Buildings; 53.30178°N 1.12386°W		18th century	A house, later altered and used for other purposes, it is in red brick with stone dressings, floor bands, modillioned eaves, a coped parapet, and a slate roof. There are three storeys and two bays. The ground floor contains a later segmental arched entry, and in the upper floors are sash windows with segmental heads.	II
Ratcliffe Grange Farmhouse and farm buildings 53.29087°N 1.17167°W	—	Mid 18th century	The farmhouse and buildings are in stone, and have a continuous tile roof with coped gables and kneelers. There are two storeys and an L-shaped plan, consisting of a front of three bays, and a rear wing, attached to which are three-bay farm buildings. On the front is a gabled porch, the windows are casements with segmental heads, and in the farm buildings are barn doors and vents.	II
Drive walls and gate piers, Worksop Manor; 53.30009°N 1.14567°W	—	18th century	The pair of walls are in stone and extend for about 200 metres (660 ft). They contain intermediate buttresses, and at intervals are rusticated gate piers with pyramidal caps.	II
Estate House, Worksop Manor; 53.29919°N 1.14600°W	—	Mid 18th century	The house is in stone with a floor band, moulded eaves, and a hipped slate roof. There are two storeys and three bays. On the front is a flat-roofed porch, and the windows are sashes.	II
The Lion Hotel and Restaurant; 53.30196°N 1.12482°W		18th century	The hotel is in colourwashed stone on a plinth, with rusticated quoins, a fascia board with iron cresting, a floor band, and a hipped slate roof. There are three storeys and attics and four bays. In the ground floor is an arcade with Doric columns, a carriage entry on the right, and sash windows to the left. The upper floors contain sash windows in moulded architraves, in the centre of the middle floor is a wrought iron sign bracket, and in the roof are two flat-roofed dormers.	II
Castle Farm, walls and outbuildings 53.28775°N 1.13793°W	—	1758	A farmhouse designed with the appearance of a castle, it is in stone on a plinth, with quoins, floor bands and slate roofs, and the buildings are arranged around a courtyard. In the centre of the north range is a two-storey five-bay pavilion containing a two-storey canted bay window, a central opening with a moulded surround and an ogee double arch, and sash windows and niches with ogee heads. This is linked by walls to pavilions with stepped gables, in turn linked to two-storey corner towers with ogee and quatrefoil openings. The walls surrounding the courtyard have corner and intermediate towers, and all the buildings have coped embattled parapets.	II*
124 Bridge Street; 53.30155°N 1.12468°W		1760	A house later used for other purposes, it is in red brick with a floor band, a coped parapet, a decorative iron balustrade, and a pantile roof. There are three storeys and attics, and three bays, the left bay recessed. In the left bay is a carriage entry, and to the right a shop front flanked by Doric columns. The upper two floors contain sash windows with rubbed brick heads and keystones, and in the roof is a gabled dormer. A decorative rainwater head is inscribed with the date.	II
Park House; 53.29996°N 1.12384°W		c. 1760	A town house that has been extended, it is in red and white brick, partly colourwashed, with roofs of slate and tile. The original part has three storeys and three bays, floor bands, and openings with moulded surrounds, panelled lintels and keystones. The ground and top floors contain sash windows, and in the middle floor is a central canted bay window, flanked by blind windows. The 19th-century extension to the left has two storeys and two bays, and contains a doorway with a rectangular fanlight and side lights, and sash windows. At the rear are two two-storey wings, and a loggia with Doric piers and columns.	II
126 and 128 Bridge Street; 53.30147°N 1.12466°W		1761	A house, later shops, in brick with stone dressings, floor bands, a coped parapet, and a slate roof. There are three storeys and attics, and four bays. In the ground floor are shop fronts, the middle floor contains French windows, the top floor has sash windows, and in the roof are two gabled dormers with casement windows and bargeboards. A decorative rainwater head is inscribed with the date.	II
West Lodge and Gateway; 53.29551°N 1.15843°W		1763	The lodge and gateway were designed by James Paine. The lodge is in stone, and has a hipped slate roof, two storeys, an octagonal plan, and three bays. The west front is canted, and the windows are sashes with keystones. The gateway is flanked by a pair of rusticated piers.	II
Pediment north of Worksop Manor; 53.29623°N 1.14591°W	—	1765	The pediment is a pieced-together sculpture carved by William Collins. It is in stone, it has moulded eaves, and there are pastoral scenes in the tympanum.	II
Remains of statues, Worksop Manor; 53.29702°N 1.14725°W	—	1765	The statues from the pediment, probably by William Collins, have been moved into the grounds of the house. They are in stone and consist of three draped allegorical female figures.	II
60, 62, 64 and 66 Bridge Street; 53.30334°N 1.12475°W		1769	A house extended to the right in the 19th century and later used as shops, it is in rendered brick, with a moulded eaves cornice, and a pantile roof with a coped gable and kneeler. There are two storeys and attics, seven bays, and a rear wing. In the ground floor are 20th-century shop fronts, above one of which are the remains of a pediment. The upper floor contains blocked windows in architraves, in the roof are three pedimented dormers, and in the rear wing is a re-set datestone.	II
79 and 81 Bridge Street; 53.30243°N 1.12457°W		Late 18th century	A house, later shops, in red brick on a stone plinth, with stone dressings, a floor band, a parapet, and a pantile roof. There are two storeys, six bays, and a two-bay rear wing. In the ground floor are 20th-century shop fronts, and a flat-headed carriage entry to the right. The upper floors contain sash windows with rubbed brick heads and keystones.	II
83 and 85 Bridge Street; 53.30235°N 1.12455°W		Late 18th century	Houses, later shops, in rendered brick, with a floor band, cogged eaves and a pantile roof. There are two storeys and five bays. In the ground floor are 20th-century shop fronts, and the upper floor contains three sash windows with keystones on the left, and two casement windows to the right.	II
98 and 100 Bridge Street; 53.30238°N 1.12486°W	—	Late 18th century	A house, later shops, in rendered brick, with a moulded first floor band, a rendered second floor band, a coped parapet, and a pantile roof. There are seven bays, the left four bays with three storeys, and the right three bays with two. In the ground floor are 20th-century shop fronts, and the upper floors contain sash windows.	II
102 and 104 Bridge Street; 53.30222°N 1.12482°W		Late 18th century	A house later used as shops and offices, it is in colourwashed stone, with floor bands, deep moulded eaves, and a slate roof with a coped gable. There are three storeys and seven bays. In the centre of the ground floor is a doorway with a moulded surround and a rectangular fanlight, flanked by 20th-century shop fronts. The upper floors contain sash windows in moulded architraves.	II
1, 2 and 3 Park Place; 53.29967°N 1.12316°W		Late 18th century	A row of three houses, with a service wing to the right, in red brick with dentilled eaves, and a pantile roof. There are two storeys and attics, and four bays. The doorways have semicircular fanlights, and modillioned hoods on reeded scroll brackets. The windows are sashes with segmental heads, and there is a single dormer. The service wing has two storeys and two bays, and contains garage doors, and casement windows with segmental heads.	II
10 Potter Street; 53.30179°N 1.12372°W		Late 18th century	The house, later offices, is in red brick on a plinth, with stone dressings, floor bands, moulded eaves, and a pantile roof. There are three storeys and five bays, and it contains sash windows with rubbed brick heads and keystones.	II
23, 25 and 27 Potter Street; 53.30216°N 1.12302°W		Late 18th century	A row of three houses in red brick on a plinth, with stone dressings and a pantile roof. There are three storeys and four bays. On the front is a round-headed passage entry with a keystone, three other doorways with fanlight, and sash windows. All the windows and the doorways, other than the passage entry, have channelled wedge lintels and keystones.	II
39 and 41 Potter Street; 53.30240°N 1.12148°W		Late 18th century	A pair of houses under a continuous roof, they are in colourwashed brick on a plinth, and have a floor band, dentilled eaves, a hipped pantile roof, and two storeys. No. 39, on the left, has three bays, a central doorway with a frectangular fanlight, and a pediment on consoles, and sash windows in stuccoed architraves. No. 41 has five bays, a doorway in the left bay with a plain surround, and a blocked rectangular fanlight. The doorway and the windows, which are sashes, have hoods on brackets.	II
81 Potter Street; 53.30303°N 1.11871°W		Late 18th century	The house, at one time a vicarage, and later used as offices, is in red brick on a stone plinth, with stone dressings, dentilled eaves and a hipped pantile roof. There are two storeys, an L-shaped plan, and a front of three bays. In the centre is a doorway with a semicircular fanlight and a hood on reeded curved brackets. The windows are sashes with wedge lintels and keystones.	II
3 and 5 White Hart Yard; 53.30122°N 1.12541°W	—	Late 18th century	A red brick house with dentilled eaves and a pantile roof. There are three storeys and two bays. The doorway has a segmental head, there is one casement window, and the other windows are sashes, those in the lower two floors with segmental heads.	II
Ice house 53.32812°N 1.13764°W	—	Late 18th century	The ice house to the rear of Gateford Farm House is in stone and brick. The west entrance has brick stairs, a stone lintel, and an inner doorway, and on the east side is a stone ramp and lintel. Inside, there is a square chamber with a segmental brick vault.	II
Outbuilding, cottage and petrol pump, Harness Grove House; 53.29650°N 1.17006°W	—	Late 18th century	A stable block converted for other uses, it is in stone, and has a pantile roof with a coped gable and kneelers. There is a single story and seven bays. The outbuilding has four stable doors and four fixed lights, and the cottage to the right has a round-headed window, and a doorway with a Tudor arched head. Outside is an iron semi-rotary petrol pump with a glass globe, dating from about 1920.	II
Quorn House; 53.30253°N 1.12137°W		Late 18th century	An industrial building converted into offices, it is in colourwashed brick with a floor band, dentilled eaves and slate roofs. There are two storeys and five unequal bays. The fourth bay is lower and recessed, and contains a doorway with pilasters, moulded capitals and a hood, above which is a plaque inscribed with the name of the house. The bay to the right has a pyramidal roof, and the bays to the left have a hipped roof. In the first bay is a doorway with a segmental head, and the windows are sashes.	II
The Mill House; 53.30303°N 1.13612°W		Late 18th century	The house is in rendered stone and brick with a hipped pantile roof. There are two storeys and an L-shaped plan, with a front range of five bays, a western rear wing with three storeys, and an eastern rear wing with two storeys and four bays. On the front is a doorway with pilasters and a hood on brackets, and the windows are sashes. In the angle at the rear is a porch with a four-centred arched doorway and a parapet, and at the rear is a round-headed stair window.	II
The Walrus; 53.31047°N 1.12154°W		Late 18th century	A house and a shop in stone and brick, with a pantile roof. There are two storeys and two bays. In the ground floor is a doorway with a fanlight, a sash window, and to the right a shop front with pilasters. The upper floor contains a sash window and a casement window; all the openings have segmental heads.	II
Wall, railing and gate piers, Worksop Manor; 53.29998°N 1.14828°W	—	Late 18th century	The boundary wall is in stone, and is a curved coped dwarf wall with decorative iron railings. There are straight ramped flanking sections, and two blocked gateways with chamfered rusticated piers with square caps.	II
Canal Lock, Canal Wharf; 53.30684°N 1.12327°W		c. 1776	The lock is on the Chesterfield Canal. The chamber is lined with blue brick, and there is stone coping, stepped at the east end. At the top is a single gate, and at the lower end a pair of mitre gates.	II
Grafton House; 53.30769°N 1.12178°W		1814	The house is in red brick on a plinth, with stone dressings, a floor band, moulded eaves, and a pantile roof with coped gables. There are two storeys and three bays, the middle bay projecting slightly under a moulded pediment containing a datestone. In the centre is a doorway with a cornice on curved brackets and a pediment, flanked by canted bay windows. The windows are sash windows, the window above the doorway with a round head, the others with flat heads, and all with keystones.	II
Gateford Hill House; 53.33134°N 1.14496°W	—	1824	A small country house to which extensive extensions were added in 1959–63. The original house is in stone on a plinth, with a cornice, a parapet, and a hipped slate roof. There are two storeys, and an L-shaped plan, with a front of five bays, and a recessed west service wing with two storeys and four bays. The south front has projecting outer bays, and a central Greek Doric porch with paired columns, a cornice and a balustrade, and a round-headed doorway with a hood, a fanlight, and flanking antae. The windows are sashes, those in the ground floor with aprons. The east front has a central recessed bay containing a full-height sash window with a pediment on consoles. The 20th-century extension has eleven bays.	II
Stables, Gateford Hill House; 53.33153°N 1.14544°W	—	1824	The stable block is in stone on a plinth, and has an eaves band and a hipped slate roof. There are two storeys and five bays. The left four bays contain segmental arches, the left wider and with a datestone above. In the right bay is a sash window, and the upper floor contains casement windows. On the roof is an octagonal timber bell cupola, with a clock, above which are round-headed openings, a cornice, and an ogee lead dome with a ball finial.	II
93 and 93a Bridge Street; 53.30206°N 1.12450°W		Early 19th century	A house, later shops, in stuccoed brick, with quoins on the right, plain eaves, and a hipped slate roof. There are four storeys, four bays, and a later rear wing. In the ground floor are 20th-century shop fronts, and the upper floors contain sash windows.	II
19 Park Street; 53.30044°N 1.12378°W		Early 19th century	A house in red brick with dentilled eaves and a pantile roof. There are two storeys and two bays. The central doorway has a moulded surround, a rectangular fanlight, and a hood on curved brackets, and to the right is a smaller doorway with a segmental head. The windows are sashes with moulded architraves.	II
21, 23, 25 and 27 Park Street; 53.30027°N 1.12369°W		Early 19th century	A terrace of four red brick houses with dressings in stone and stucco and a slate roof. There are three storeys and eight bays. The doorways have reeded surrounds, rectangular fanlights, and segmental pediments on moulded brackets. Also on the front is a round-headed passage doorway with a moulded soffit, imposts and keystones. The windows are sashes with channelled wedge lintels and keystones.	II
37 Potter Street; 53.30235°N 1.12186°W		Early 19th century	A house, later offices, in red brick on a plinth, with rendered stone dressings, a floor band, and hipped roofs, in pantile on the main block and in slate on the extension. There are two storeys and three bays, and a lower two-storey single-bay wing on the left. The doorway has a rectangular fanlight and a hood on brackets, and the windows are sashes.	II
38 Potter Street; 53.30215°N 1.12192°W		Early 19th century	A house, later offices, in red brick on a plinth, with dentilled eaves and a pantile roof. There are three storeys, an L-shaped plan, and a front of five bays. Steps lead up to the central doorway that has plain jambs and a rectangular fanlight. The doorway and the windows, which are sashes, have rubbed brick heads and keystones.	II
Boundary wall and gate piers, Canal Wharf; 53.30679°N 1.12153°W		Early 19th century	The wall, which extends along the south boundary of the wharf for about 150 metres (490 ft), is in stone on the outside, brick on the inside, it has stone coping, and is ramped up in the middle. At each end are gate piers in alternating brick and stone, with stone pyramidal caps.	II
Barn and stable, Lodge Farm; 53.30602°N 1.15430°W	—	Early 19th century	The barn and stable range are in stone, with quoins, an eaves band, and hipped pantile roofs. The barn has two storeys and four bays, and the stable range to the east is lower, with two storeys and three bays. The openings include doorways, horizontally-sliding sash windows, hatches, vents, and pitching holes. By the stable block is a mounting block.	II
Manor Hill House; 53.28900°N 1.11996°W	—	Early 19th century	An estate house in stone and brick, on a plinth, with a hipped slate roof. There are two storeys, a double depth plan and three bays, On the west front is a porch, there is one casement window, and the other windows are sashes.	II
Mill Cottages and outbuilding 53.30310°N 1.13633°W		Early 19th century	A pair of cottages, now derelict, in stone and brick, with two storeys and two bays. In the centre are paired doorways with chamfered jambs and lintels, the right one with a segmental head. The windows are casements, those in the ground floor with segmental heads. At the rear is a single-storey lean-to.	II
45 Carlton Road; 53.30952°N 1.12213°W		c. 1830	A house, later offices, it is stuccoed, on a stone plinth, with dentilled eaves and a pyramidal slate roof. There are two storeys and three bays. In the centre is a latticed timber porch with a moulded surround and an ogee roof, and a doorway with a fanlight. The windows are sashes with wedge lintels, and in the left return, facing the road, is a shop window.	II
St Mary's Church; 53.29920°N 1.12303°W		1838–40	The church, designed by Weightman and Hadfield in Gothic style, is built in stone with a slate roof, and consists of a nave and a chancel with a canted apse under a continuous roof. At the west end is a doorway with a four-centred arched head, a chamfered surround, and shields in the spandrels. Above it are two gargoyles, a four-light Perpendicular window, and a canopied niche containing a statue. On the gable is a bellcote and a cross, and at the east end is a triple lancet window flanked by double lancets.	II
St Mary's School; 53.29941°N 1.12261°W		1840	The school, designed by Weightman and Hadfield, is in stone on a chamfered plinth, with floor bands, sprocketed eaves, and a tile roof with coped gables. There are two storeys, and a T-shaped plan with a front of three bays. The windows are transomed casements, and there is a gable ventilator.	II
Canal Cottage and wall 53.30680°N 1.12270°W		c. 1840	Canal offices, later a public house, in brick with a hipped tile roof. There are two storeys and three unequal bays. The doorway has a round-arched head and a fanlight, and the windows are sashes with segmental heads. On the east end is a canted bay window. Enclosing the boundary is a dwarf stone wall with chamfered coping, wrought iron railings, and a pair of gate piers with pyramidal caps.	II
Former Depository, Canal Wharf; 53.30687°N 1.12206°W		c. 1840	The building is in yellowish brick with stone dressings and a hipped slate roof. There are three storeys and four bays. To the south is an elliptical arch with voussoirs and a rusticated soffit spanning the Chesterfield Canal. To the right is a doorway in each lower floor with an elliptical arch, above which is a metal hood on timber brackets. The windows are casements with segmental heads.	II*
Lloyds Bank; 53.30299°N 1.12442°W		1843–44	The bank, which is in Neoclassical style, is in stone, partly rendered, on a rendered plinth, with a floor band, a moulded cornice, an eaves band, and a parapet. There are two storeys and four bays. The outer bays contain porches with pilasters and an entablature, on the right it contains a recessed doorway with a fanlight, and on the left it has been converted into a cash dispenser. Between them are casement windows with Doric responds and moulded heads, and in the upper floor are sash windows with moulded architraves and hoods.	II
Former Abbey Infant School Annexe; 53.30423°N 1.11607°W		1849	The former school, which was extended in 1878, is in stone, and has a slate roof with coped gables, kneelers and a finial. There is a single storey, seven bays, three of which are gabled and contain a triple stepped lancet window. There are two doorways with pointed arches and hood moulds. At the west end is a porch with a coped parapet, and on the front facing the road is a three-light mullioned window with a depressed ogee hood mould.	II
120 and 122 Bridge Street; 53.30160°N 1.12470°W		Mid 19th century	A commercial building in stone, with dressings in stone and concrete, chamfered quoins, a moulded floor band and eaves cornice, a parapet, and a slate roof with coped gables. There are three storeys and four bays. In the ground floor is a 20th-century shop front, and above are sash windows with moulded architraves and sills, those in the middle floor with pediments, the outer ones triangular and the inner ones segmental.	II
19 and 19A Potter Street; 53.30208°N 1.12348°W		Mid 19th century	The house is in red brick with stone dressings and a pantile roof. There are three storeys, and L-shaped plan, with a front of three bays, and a short rear wing. In the centre is a doorway with a moulded surround, and a hood with a splayed roof on consoles. The windows are sashes with moulded surrounds and keystones.	II
31 Potter Street; 53.30222°N 1.12268°W		Mid 19th century	A shop with living accommodation above, it is in stone, with a floor band, deep moulded eaves, a parapet and a slate roof. There are two storeys and three bays. In the right bay is a round-headed carriage entry with coffered imposts and a hood mould, and to the left is a 19th-century shop front with a recessed doorway. The upper floor contains sash windows in moulded architraves.	II
9 White Hart Yard; 53.30124°N 1.12524°W	—	19th century	A pair of cottages combined into one house, it is in brick on a stone plinth, with dentilled eaves and a pantile roof. There are two storeys and two bays. The doorway has a segmental head, there is a blocked opening, and the windows are a mix of sashes and casements, some with segmental heads.	II
Forest Hill House; 53.32323°N 1.10594°W	—	Mid 19th century	A large stone house with hipped slate roofs. There are two storeys and attics, and an L-shaped plan with five bays and a wing on the right. On the east front is a porch with a pediment, a lintel band, and a doorway with a fanlight. To the left is an oriel bow window, and to the right is a mullioned and transomed window. The other windows are sashes. On the west front is a two-storey canted bay window, and the south front has a flat-roofed dormer with six casements.	II
North Lodge, Forest Hill House; 53.32374°N 1.10474°W	—	Mid 19th century	The lodge is in stone on a plinth, with a canted hipped slate roof. There are two storeys and two bays. On the east front is a central doorway, and on the east and south fronts are casement windows and gabled eaves dormers.	II
South Lodge, Forest Hill House; 53.32353°N 1.10504°W		Mid 19th century	The lodge is in stone with a canted hipped slate roof. There are two storeys and two bays. The east end is canted and contains a doorway and casement window. There is a doorway and a mullioned window in the north front, and casement and mullioned windows in the west front.	II
South Lodge, Worksop Manor; 53.27259°N 1.14917°W		Mid 19th century	The lodge is in stone, on a plinth, and has hipped and canted slate roofs. There is a single storey and three bays. In the centre of the front is a projecting canted bay containing a doorway, and the widows are sashes.	II
Town Hall; 53.30174°N 1.12407°W		1851	Originally a corn exchange, the town hall is in brick and stone, with stone dressings, rusticated quoins, moulded floor bands, a string course, modillion eaves and a hipped slate roof. There are two storeys and attics, and an L-shaped plan, consisting of a front range of five bays, and a rear wing with two storeys and five bays. The middle three bays are recessed, above the ground floor is a coat of arms, and at the top is a small pediment, under which is a clock face in an ornate surround, and on the roof is a bell turret. In the ground floor are round-headed windows with rusticated architraves and keystones carved with cows' heads, those in the outer bays with Ionic colonnettes. The upper floor contains two-light casement windows with aprons. Those in the middle three bays have moulded architraves, the middle one with a triangular pediment, and the flanking windows with cornices. In the outer bays, the windows have Corinthian colonnettes and segmental pediments. In the right return is a Venetian window.	II
Former Abbey Infant School and teacher's house 53.30290°N 1.11507°W		1859	A wing at right angles was later added on the right. The school is in brick with stone dressings, and slate roofs with moulded coped gables, ventilators and crosses. There is a single storey and an L-shaped plan. The original range has a projecting bay with an ogee shaped gable, and it contains a four-light window and an inscribed datestone. The windows are mullioned and transomed, some with stepped heads. The house has two storeys and two bays and an L-shaped plan, and contains a Tudor arched door.	II
St John's Church; 53.30956°N 1.12365°W		1868–69	The church is built in stone with slate roofs, and consists of a nave with a clerestory, north and south aisles, a north porch, a chancel with an organ chamber and vestry, and a west steeple. The steeple has a tower with two stages, buttresses, a moulded west portal with shafts, and a doorway with an inscribed tympanum, a north stair turret, and a west clock face. In the upper stage are paired lancet bell openings and pinnacles, surmounted by a broach spire with two tiers of lucarnes.	II
Tunnel End Lodges and portal 53.27245°N 1.14969°W		Late 19th century	A tunnel portal flanked by lodges, in stone on a plinth, with rusticated quoins, an impost band, moulded eaves, and an embattled parapet. The portal has a round-headed arch with a rusticated surround and keystones, and flanking piers with cornices and ball finials. The lodges have a single storey, and contain ogee-headed openings.	II
Worksop East Signal Box; 53.31111°N 1.12140°W		1880–85	The signal box was built for the Manchester, Sheffield and Lincolnshire Railway. It is timber framed with board cladding and has a slate roof with ornate bargeboards and finials. There are two storeys, with sash windows in the upper floor. On the east side is an open wooden staircase.	II
Sewage pumping station and chimney 53.30481°N 1.10550°W		1881	The pumping station is in red brick and stone with dressings in gault and blue brick, chamfered coping, a sill band, a round-arched corbel table, and a hipped slate roof. There is a single storey on a basement, and five bays. The windows are tall and round-headed, and contain iron-framed casements. The central doorway has a moulded lintel, and there is another doorway with a segmental head. The chimney has three stages, a stone base with recessed panels, the main stage has two tiers of tall recessed panels, and the top stage is elaborately decorated.	II
East Lodge, gateway and walls, Welbeck Abbey; 53.28718°N 1.11583°W		1894	The lodge, gateway and walls are in stone and in Baroque style. The lodge has a plinth, floor bands, a moulded coped parapet with obelisk finials, and shouldered shaped coped gables with ball finials. There are two storeys and three bays, mullioned and transomed windows, and bay windows. The entrance is flanked by huge rusticated gate piers, containing round-arched gateways with keystones. Flanking them are columns, and above are cartouches, and inscribed panels surmounted by lions. Between the piers are wrought iron gates, and outside them are curved dwarf walls with railings, ending in taller walls facing the road, with corner piers, niches, buttresses and ball finials.	II
Worksop railway station, house and outbuildings 53.31152°N 1.12290°W		1894	The station was built for the Manchester, Sheffield and Lincolnshire Railway and designed by Weightman and Hadfield in Jacobean style. It is built in stone with slate roofs, and is mainly in a single storey with 17 unequal bays and three shaped gables. The station house has two storeys and attics, and three bays, and there is a coped boundary wall. On the platform side are glazed iron canopies and a footbridge.	II
Worksop College; 53.28837°N 1.10410°W		1894	The school was founded by Nathaniel Woodard, and the original buildings were designed by R. H. Carpenter. The headmaster's house was built in 1897, the chapel designed by Aston Webb was added between 1908 and 1911, and wings in 1907, 1928, 1931 and 1934. The buildings are in brick with stone dressings and tile roofs, they are in Tudor Revival style, with crow-stepped gables, and are arranged around a quadrangle, with projecting wings. The hall has a single storey and seven bays, and the headmaster's house has three storeys, four bays and an L-shaped plan. The chapel is in Gothic Revival style, and consists of an ante-chapel, a nave and a chancel under a continuous roof, a bell turret at the west end, and flanking towers at the east end, each with a domed octagonal cap and a finial.	II
36 and 38 Carlton Road; 53.30935°N 1.12171°W		1890s (probable)	The building, at one time council offices, is in Edwardian Baroque style. It is in stone and brick with a moulded balustrade and parapet and a Westmorland green slate roof. There are two storeys and attics, and an L-shaped plan, with a front of four unequal bays. It contains a round-headed carriage entry flanked by engaged Doric columns with Ionic capitals, above which is an oriel window and a lettered frieze. Over this is a tower with Doric colonnettes, oval openings, an entablature with a dentilled cornice and a ribbed copper square dome with a finial. The bays flanking the entry have two-storey bow windows, and to the left is a doorway with a moulded architrave, a fanlight, a frieze and a segmental pediment.	II
116 Bridge Street; 53.30178°N 1.12477°W		1900	A bank, later a shop, it is in stone on a plinth, with decorative bands, a cornice with egg and dart decoration, and a tile roof. There are three storeys and an attic, and four bays. In the ground floor is an elliptical-headed shop window with a mask keystone, flanked by segmental-headed doorways with shouldered pediments containing coats of arms. The upper floors contain casement windows, those in the middle floor with arched glazing bars and moulded hoods, and in the top floor with moulded architraves, aprons, broken pulvinated friezes, and shouldered pediments. In the attic is a gabled dormer, and to the right of the building is a decorative inscribed and dated corbel.	II
118 Bridge Street; 53.30169°N 1.12481°W		c. 1900	Originally the Royal Hotel, the building is in red brick with stone details and banding, and has a large coped gable with a shaped head, strapwork and a finial. There are four storeys and three bays. In the lower two storeys is a round arch with a keystone. Recessed in the ground floor of the arch is a canted bay window and a round-headed doorway to the right. Above this is a wrought iron balcony with a balustrade, and a large semicircular window with a central glazed door. The top two floors contain sash windows, in the third floor with curved linked pediments, and in the top floor with pointed pediments, the middle one raised.	II
114 Bridge Street; 53.30187°N 1.12478°W		1905	A hotel, later a restaurant, it is in brick with stone dressings, a moulded floor band and cornice, dentilled eaves, a curved parapet with a central balustrade, and a slate roof. There are three storeys and three bays. In the ground floor is an entry on the left, and a 20th-century shop front flanked by rusticated piers. The upper floors contain casement windows in architraves, those in the middle floor with segmental pediments on consoles, and in the top floor with triangular pediments on consoles. Above the outer bays are dentilled broken pediments.	II
The French Horn Public House; 53.30203°N 1.12365°W		1906	The public house is in red brick with dressings in terracotta and faience, and a tile roof with crested ridges. There is a front of three storeys and five bays, a canted bay on the corner, and a return of three storeys and three bays, then two storeys and three bays. The ground floor is in dark and light green faience on a plinth of brown tiles. There are three wide arched windows, and the doorway has pilasters and an oval fanlight with keystones, over which is a scrolled pediment. Above the windows and doorway is a fascia with lettering. The middle floor contain pilasters, and two-light windows with decorative aprons, and in the top floor are gablets with decorative bargeboards and elaborate finials. In the bay above the entrance is an elaborate cartouche with swags and a shell finial.	II
St Anne's Church and wall 53.30282°N 1.13288°W		1911–12	The church, designed by Austin and Paley in Perpendicular style, is built in stone with roofs in Westmorland slate, lead, slab and board. It consists of a nave with a clerestory, north and south aisles, a north porch, north and south transepts, a chancel with a vestry and a chapel, and a northwest tower. The tower has four stages, corner buttresses, a plinth, string courses and bands. On the west side is a pointed doorway with a moulded surround and traceried spandrels, above which is a triple lancet window with an ogee head, a double lancet window, and a clock face. In the top stage are two-light bell openings, over which is an embattled parapet with traceried panels. The churchyard is enclosed by coped stone walls, it has canted corners, and contains terminal and gate piers with concave-domed tops.	II
St Anne's War Memorial; 53.30298°N 1.13340°W		1920	The war memorial stands in a triangular area to the northwest of St Anne's Church. It is in stone, and consists of a Latin cross on a slender hexagonal shaft, on an elaborate hexagonal plinth with canopies over each panel, on a hexagonal base of three steps. Around the plinth are three flying buttresses, and on the plinth are bronze plaques with an inscription and the names of those lost in the two World Wars.	II
Worksop War Memorial and associated structures 53.30412°N 1.11922°W		1925	The war memorial, which stands in an enclosure, is a cenotaph in Portland stone on a base of Aberdeen granite. It consists of a rectangular block in two stages, over which is a rectangular domed cap with a moulded cornice. The block is supported by flying buttresses with scrolled feet, domed caps and cross motifs. On the front and rear are bronze plaques with inscriptions, and the names of those lost in the two World Wars. To the west is a monument in the form of a lectern commemorating the Sherwood Foresters Regiment. The enclosure is surrounded by iron posts and chains, and at the ends are piers each carrying a three-branched lamp standard.	II*
Waddington; 53.30659°N 1.12342°W		1930	A shop on a corner site that was expanded and refurbished in the 1950s. The shopfront is faced in red marble and the rear is in red brick. There are two storeys, a roughly triangular plan, and a front of two bays. The ground floor has an asymmetrical glazed lobby beneath an inscribed marble fascia. The interior of the shop contains a scheme of furnishings by Robert Thompson, including over 30 carved mice.	II
Telephone kiosk 53.30119°N 1.12440°W		1935	The K6 type telephone kiosk in Market Place was designed by Giles Gilbert Scott. Constructed in cast iron with a square plan and a dome, it has three unperforated crowns in the top panels.	II
Former Library and Museum; 53.30448°N 1.11897°W		1938	The building is in red brick with a single storey and 15 bays. In the centre is a stone Tuscan portico with columns in antis, a moulded architrave, and an inscribed frieze, above which is a parapet with a coat of arms. Behind the portico is a domed rotunda with a bronze finial, and flanking it are wings with apsidal ends. The windows have metal frames. In front of the entrance are steps flanked by four-stage square piers with vase finials. The dwarf boundary wall contains 28 dwarf piers linked by metal bands.	II
IBTE Museum of Telecommunications; 53.30289°N 1.12162°W		1939	The telephone exchange, later a museum, is in red brick with a hipped roof in Westmorland slate. There is a single storey, and facing the road is a projecting bay with the words "TELEPHONE" and "EXCHANGE" inscribed. On the west front is a recessed entrance, and the windows are cross casements.	II
