= Worksop =

Market town in Bassetlaw, Nottinghamshire, England

Coordinates: 53°18′15″N 1°07′28″W

- Town
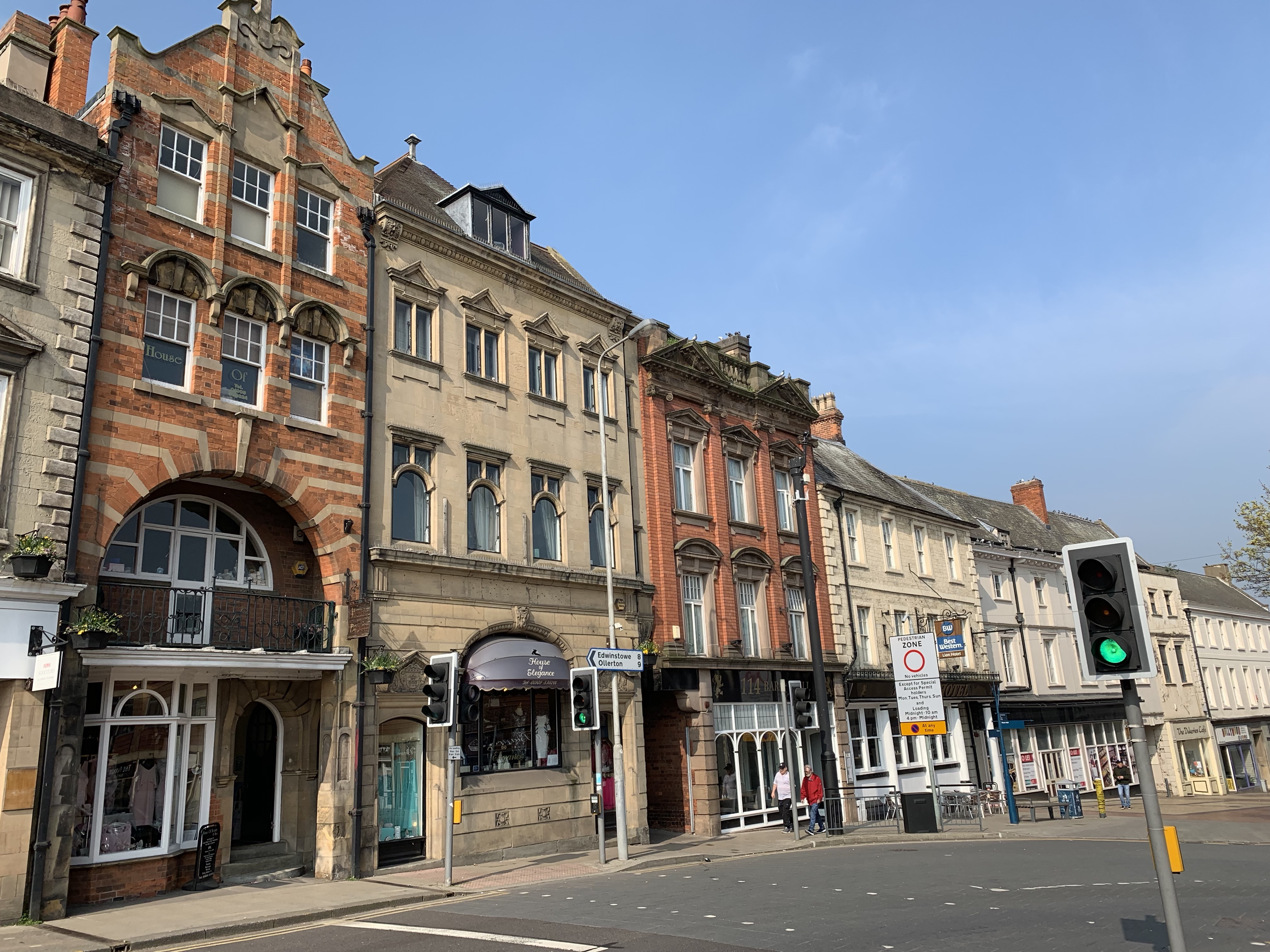
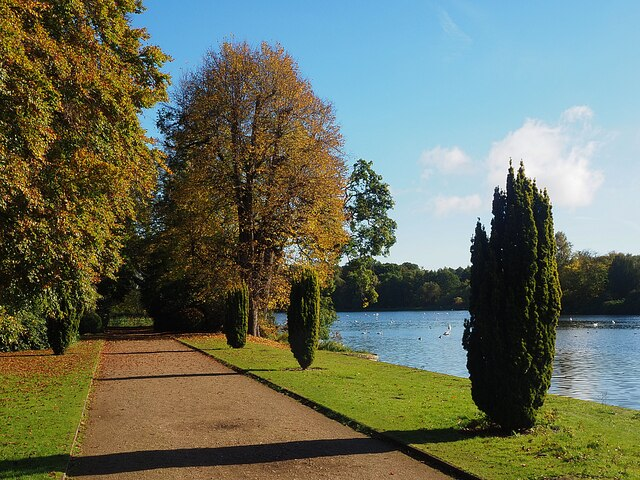
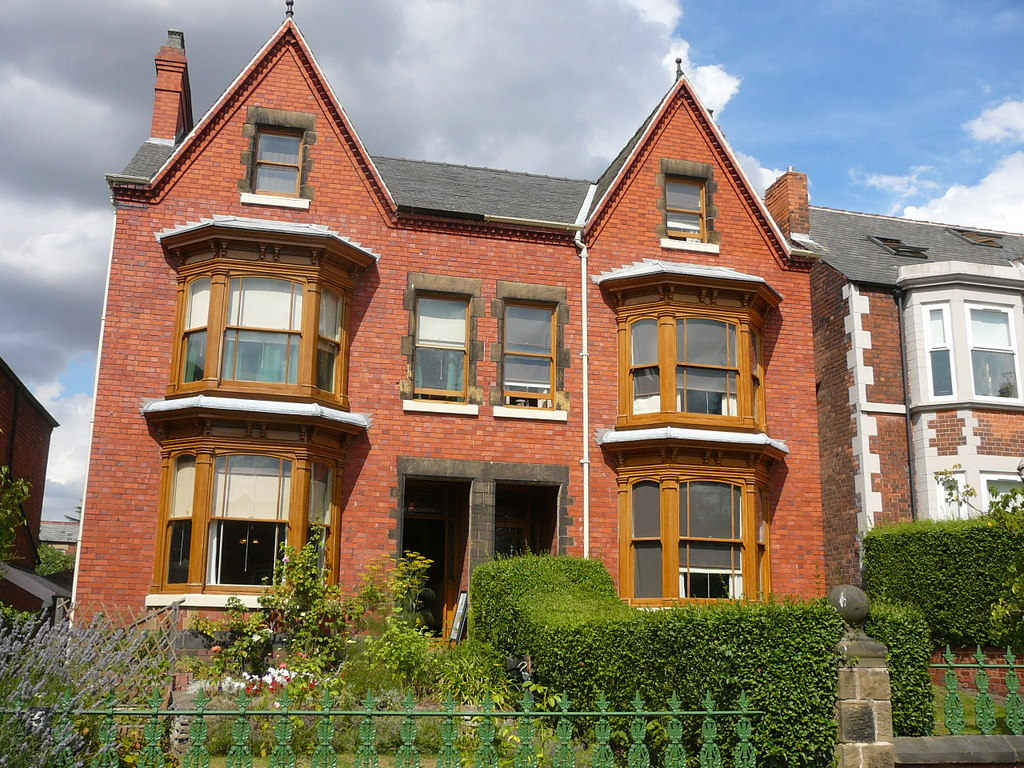
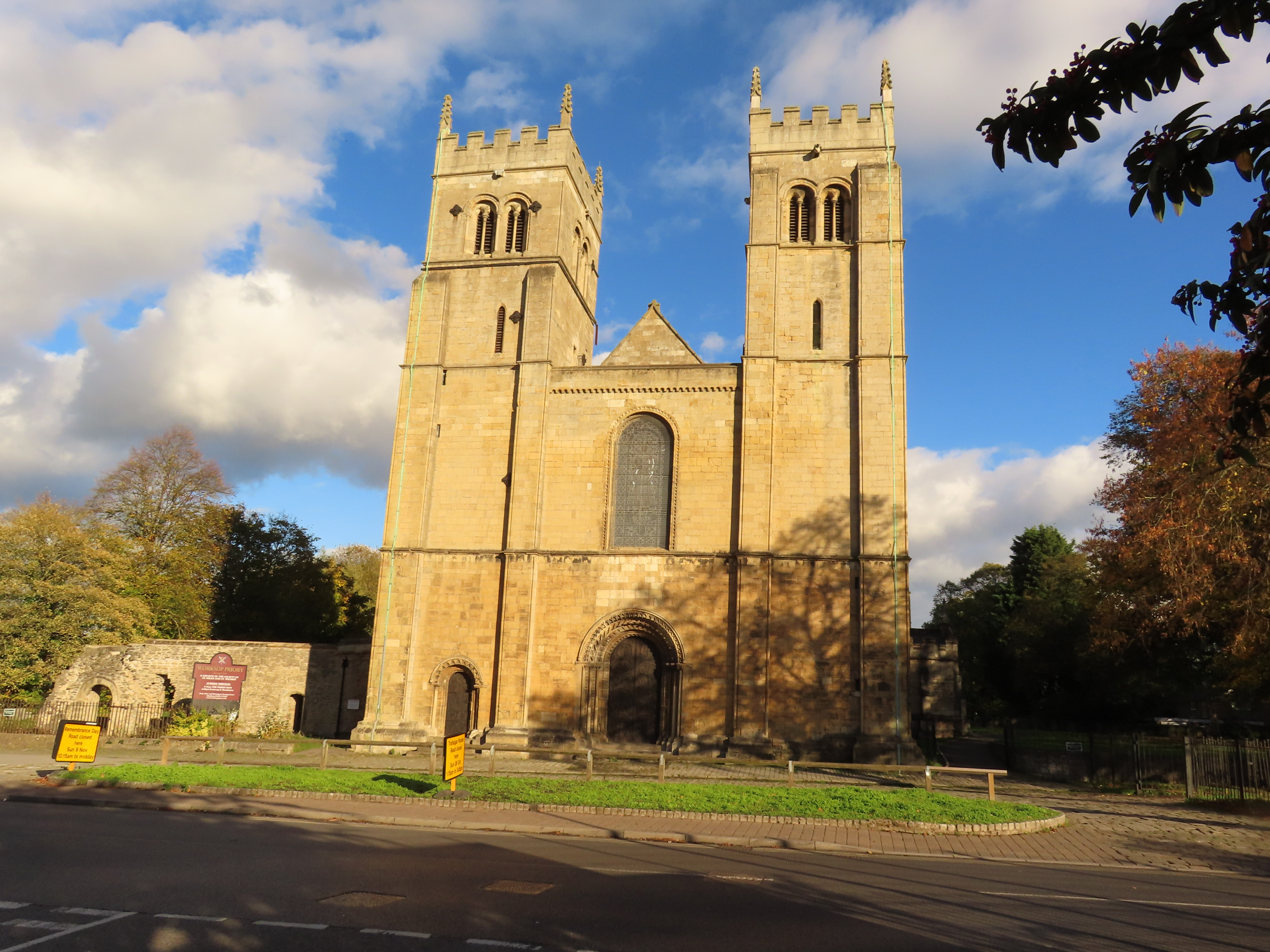
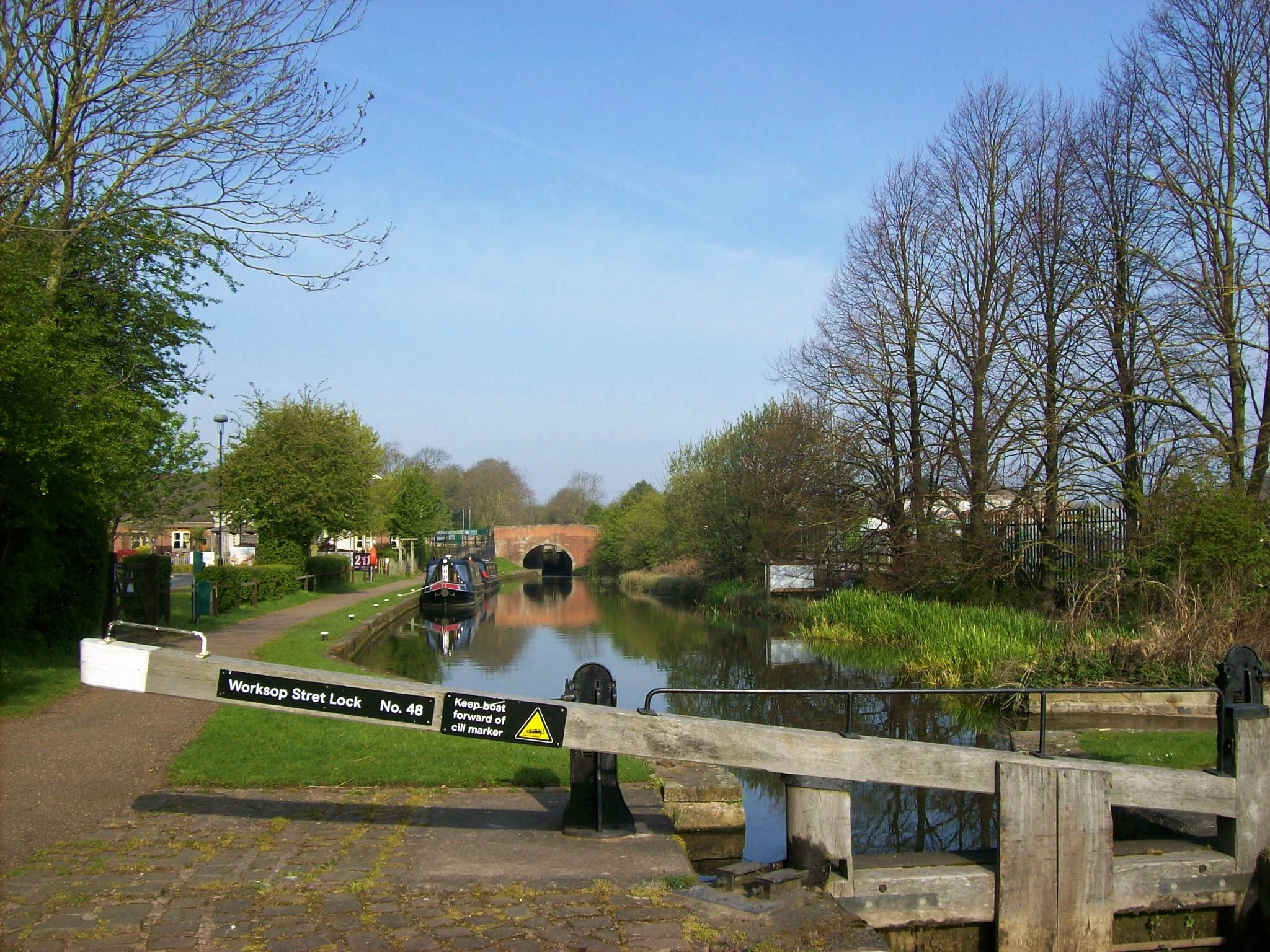
- Bridge Street Clumber Park Mr Straw's House Worksop Priory Chesterfield Canal

- Location within Nottinghamshire
- Population: 44,733
- Demonym: Worksopian
- OS grid reference: SK 58338 78967
- District: Bassetlaw
- Shire county: Nottinghamshire
- Region: East Midlands
- Country: England
- Sovereign state: United Kingdom
- Areas of the town: List: Carlton Forest; Darfoulds; Gateford; High Hoe Road; Kilton; Manton; Rhodesia; Shireoaks (Village); Town Centre
- Post town: WORKSOP
- Postcode district: S80, S81
- Dialling code: 01909
- Police: Nottinghamshire
- Fire: Nottinghamshire
- Ambulance: East Midlands
- UK Parliament: Bassetlaw
- Website: https://www.bassetlaw.gov.uk/

Worksop (/ˈwɜːrksɒp/ WURK-sop) is a market town in the Bassetlaw District in Nottinghamshire, England. Located close to Nottinghamshire's borders with South Yorkshire and Derbyshire, it is on the River Ryton and not far from the northern edge of Sherwood Forest. The population of the town was recorded at 44,733 in the 2021 Census. To the south of Worksop is the area of the Dukeries.

== Toponymy ==
Worksop was part of what was called Bernetseatte (burnt lands) in Anglo-Saxon times. The name Worksop is likely of Old English origin, deriving from a personal name "We(o)rc" plus the placename element "hop" (valley). The first element is interesting because while the masculine name Weorc is unrecorded, the feminine name Werca (Verca) is found in Bede's Life of St Cuthbert. A number of other recorded place names contain this same personal name element.

== History ==
=== Anglo-Norman Times ===
In the Domesday Book of 1086, Worksop appears as Werchesope. Thoroton states that the Domesday Book records that before the Norman Conquest, Werchesope (Worksop) had belonged to Elsi, son of Caschin, who had "two manors in Werchesope, which paid to the geld as three car". After the conquest, Worksop became part of the extensive lands granted to Roger de Busli. At this time, the land "had one car. in demesne, and twenty-two sochm. on twelve bovats of this land, and twenty-four villains, and eight bord. having twenty-two car. and eight acres of meadow, pasture wood two leu. long, three quar. broad." This was valued at three pounds in Edward the Confessor's time and seven pounds in the Domesday Book. Roger administered this estate from his headquarters in Tickhill.

The manor then passed to William de Lovetot, who established a castle and endowed the Augustinian Worksop Priory around 1103. After William's death, the manor was passed to his eldest son, Richard de Lovetot, who was visited by King Stephen, at Worksop, in 1161. In 1258, a surviving inspeximus charter confirms Matilda de Lovetot's grant of the manor of Worksop to William de Furnival (her son).

=== Medieval and early modern history ===
A skirmish occurred in the area during the Wars of the Roses on 16 December 1460, commonly known as the Battle of Worksop.

In 1530, Worksop was visited by Cardinal Thomas Wolsey, who was on his way to Cawood, in Yorkshire. "Then my lord [Wolsey] intending the next day to remove from thence [Newstead Abbey] there resorted to him the Earl of Shrewsbury's keeper, and gentlemen, sent from him, to desire my lord, in their maister's behalf, to hunt in a parke of their maister's, called Worsoppe Parke." (Cavendish's Life of Wolsey)

A surviving (Cotton) manuscript written by Henry VIII nominated Worksop as one of three places in Nottinghamshire (along with Welbeck and Thurgarton) to become "bishoprics to be new made", but nothing was to come of this (White 1875), and the priory later became a victim of the dissolution of the monasteries – being closed in 1539, with its prior and 15 monks pensioned off. All the priory buildings, except the nave and west towers of the church, were demolished at this time and the stone reused elsewhere.

In 1540, John Leland noted that Worksop castle had all but disappeared, saying it was: "clene down and scant knowen wher it was". Leland noted that at that time Worksop was "a praty market of 2 streates and metely well buildid."

Worksop Manor became a prison for Mary, Queen of Scots in 1568. In 1580s the new house was built on the same site for George Talbot, 6th Earl of Shrewsbury. He was the husband of Elizabeth Talbot, Bess of Hardwick.

In the hearth tax records of 1674, Worksop is said to have had 176 households, which made it the fourth-largest settlement in Nottinghamshire after Nottingham (967 households), Newark (339), and Mansfield (318). At this time, the population is estimated to have been around 748 people.

=== Modern history ===
By 1743, 358 families were in Worksop, with a population around 1,500. This had risen by 1801 to 3,391, and by the end of the 19th century had reached 16,455.

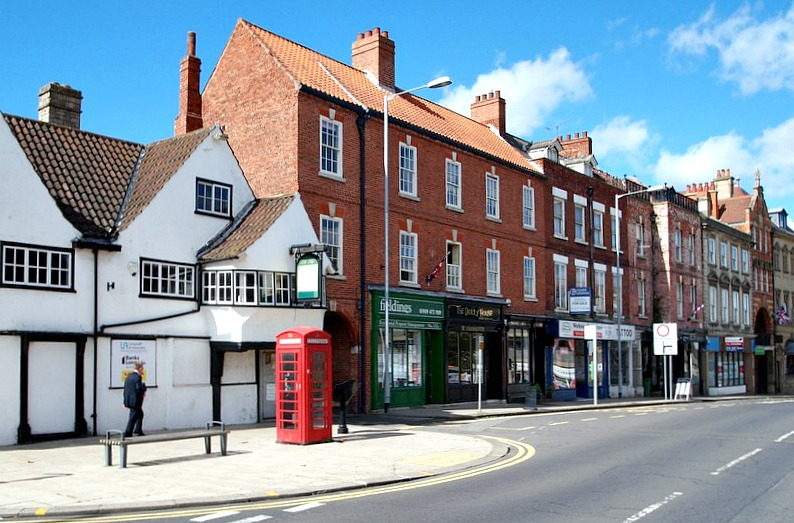
Bridge Street

During the 18th and 19th centuries, Worksop benefitted from the building of the Chesterfield Canal, which passed through the town in 1777, and the subsequent construction of the Manchester, Sheffield and Lincolnshire Railway in 1849. This led to growth that was further boosted by the discovery of coal seams beneath the town.

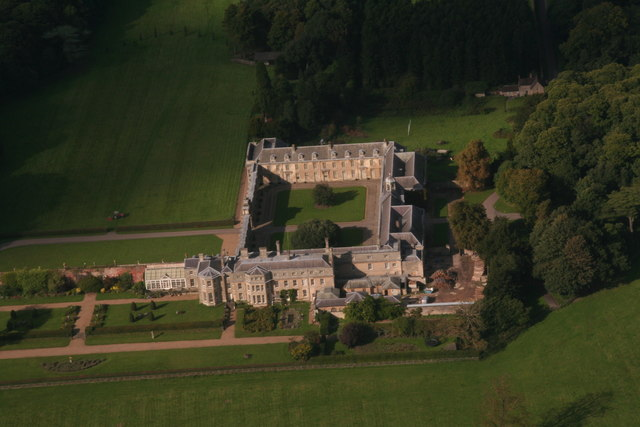
Worksop Manor

Worksop and area surrounding are known as the "Gateway to the Dukeries" due to the former ducal seats of Clumber House, Thoresby Hall, Welbeck Abbey, and Worksop Manor either owned by the Dukes of Newcastle, Portland and Kingston.

== Economy ==
=== Current economy ===
The local economy in Worksop is dominated by service industries, manufacturing and distribution. Unemployment levels in the area are now lower than the national average, owing to large number of distribution and local manufacturing companies; these include Premier Foods, RDS Transport, Pandrol and Laing O'Rourke.

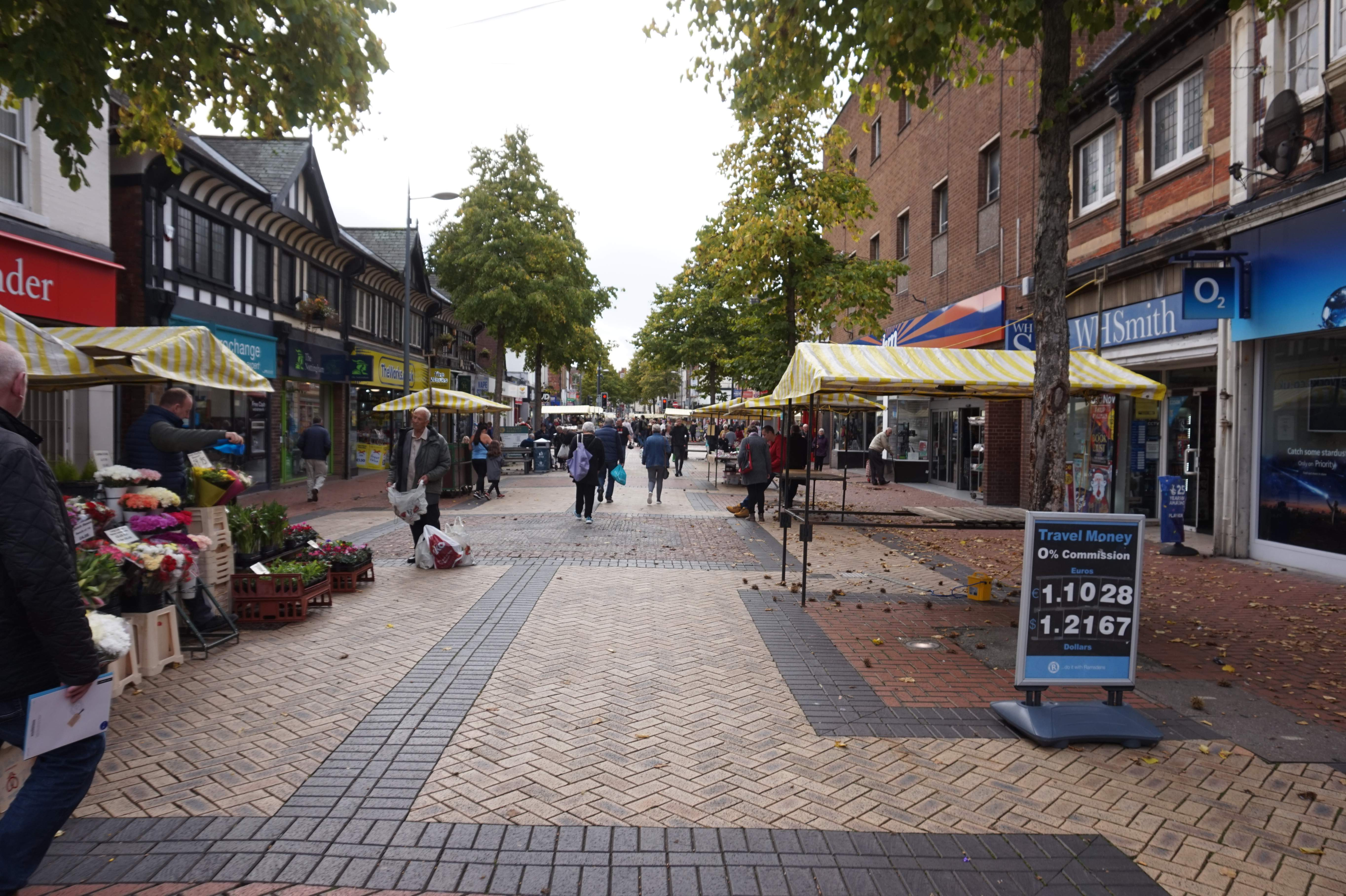
Bridge Place

Major employers in the area include Premier Foods (Worksop Factory), Greencore, RDS Transport (the Flying Fridge), B&Q, MAKE polymers, OCG Cacao, part of Cargill, Pandrol and the National Health Service (Doncaster and Bassetlaw NHS Trust).

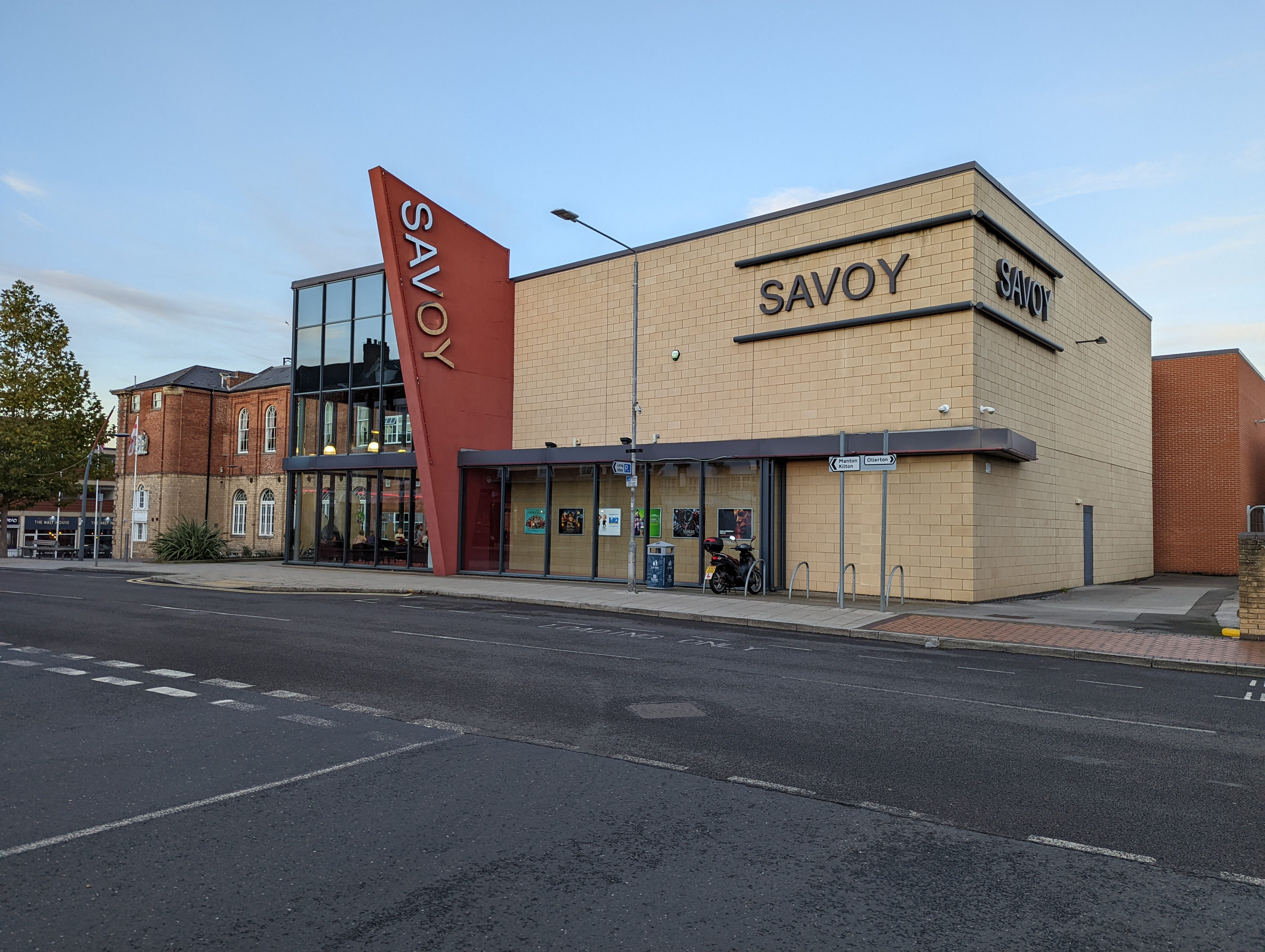
Savoy Cinema

=== Agricultural and forestry ===
John Harrison's survey of Worksop for the Earl of Arundel reveals that at that time, most people earned their living from the land. A tenant farmer, Henry Cole, farmed 200 acres of land, grazing his sheep on "Manton sheepwalk". This survey also described a corn-grinding water mill (Bracebridge mill) and Manor Mill situated near to Castle Hill, with a kiln and a malthouse.

One unusual crop associated with Worksop is liquorice. This was originally grown in the priory gardens for medicinal purposes but continued until around 1750. William Camden records in Britannia that the town was famous for growing liquorice. John Speed noted: "In the west, near Worksop, groweth plenty of Liquorice, very delicious and good". White says the liquorice gardens were "principally situated on the eastern margin of the park, near the present 'Slack Walk'." He notes that the last plant was dug up about "fifty years ago" and that this last garden had been planted by "the person after whom the 'Brompton stock' is named." A pub in Worksop is now named after this former industry.

Additionally, with much of the area being heavily forested, timber was always an important industry, supplying railway sleepers to the North Midland Railway, timber for the construction of railway carriages, and packing cases for the Sheffield cutlery industry. The town also became notable for the manufacture of Worksop Windsor chairs. Timber firms in the town included Benjamin Garside's woodyard and Godley and Goulding, situated between Eastgate and the railway.

=== Brewing and malting ===
The malting trade began in Retford, but gradually moved to Worksop, where it became an important trade, though it never employed many people. In 1852, Clinton malt kilns were built. Worksop has a strong tradition of brewing, including being the site of the historic Worksop and Retford Brewery. This brewery had previously been known as Garside and Alderson and Prior Well Brewery.

The brewing tradition is continued by a number of local independent breweries in and around the town, including Welbeck Abbey Brewery.

=== Former mining ===
At the start of the 19th century, Worksop had a largely agricultural economy with malting, corn milling, and timber working being principal industries. However, the discovery of coal meant that by 1900, the majority of the workforce was employed in coal mining, which provided thousands of jobs – both directly and indirectly – in and around Worksop for most of the 19th and 20th centuries.

The first coal mine was Shireoaks Colliery, which by 1861 employed over 200 men, which rose to 600 men by 1871. Steetley Colliery started producing coal in 1876, and in Worksop a mine was developed on land to the south-east, owned by Henry Pelham-Clinton, 7th Duke of Newcastle. This mine was fully operational in around 1907, with three shafts, and was named Manton Colliery.

The closure in the 1990s of the pits, compounding the earlier decline of the timber trade and other local industry, resulted in high unemployment in parts of the Worksop area, as well as other social problems.

=== Textiles ===
In John Harrison's survey of Worksop for the Earl of Arundel, a dye house and a tenter green (where lengths of cloth were stretched out to dry) indicates a small cloth industry was present in Worksop. Late attempts during the Industrial Revolution to introduce textile manufacturing saw two mills constructed, one at Bridge Place and the other somewhere near Mansfield Road. Both enterprises failed and closed within three years. They were converted to milling corn.

== Transport ==
=== Waterways ===
Worksop is connected to the UK inland waterways network by the Chesterfield Canal. It was built to export coal, limestone and lead from Derbyshire; iron from Chesterfield; and corn, deals, timber, groceries and general merchandise into Derbyshire. Today, the canal is used for leisure purposes together with the adjacent Sandhill Lake.

=== Railway ===
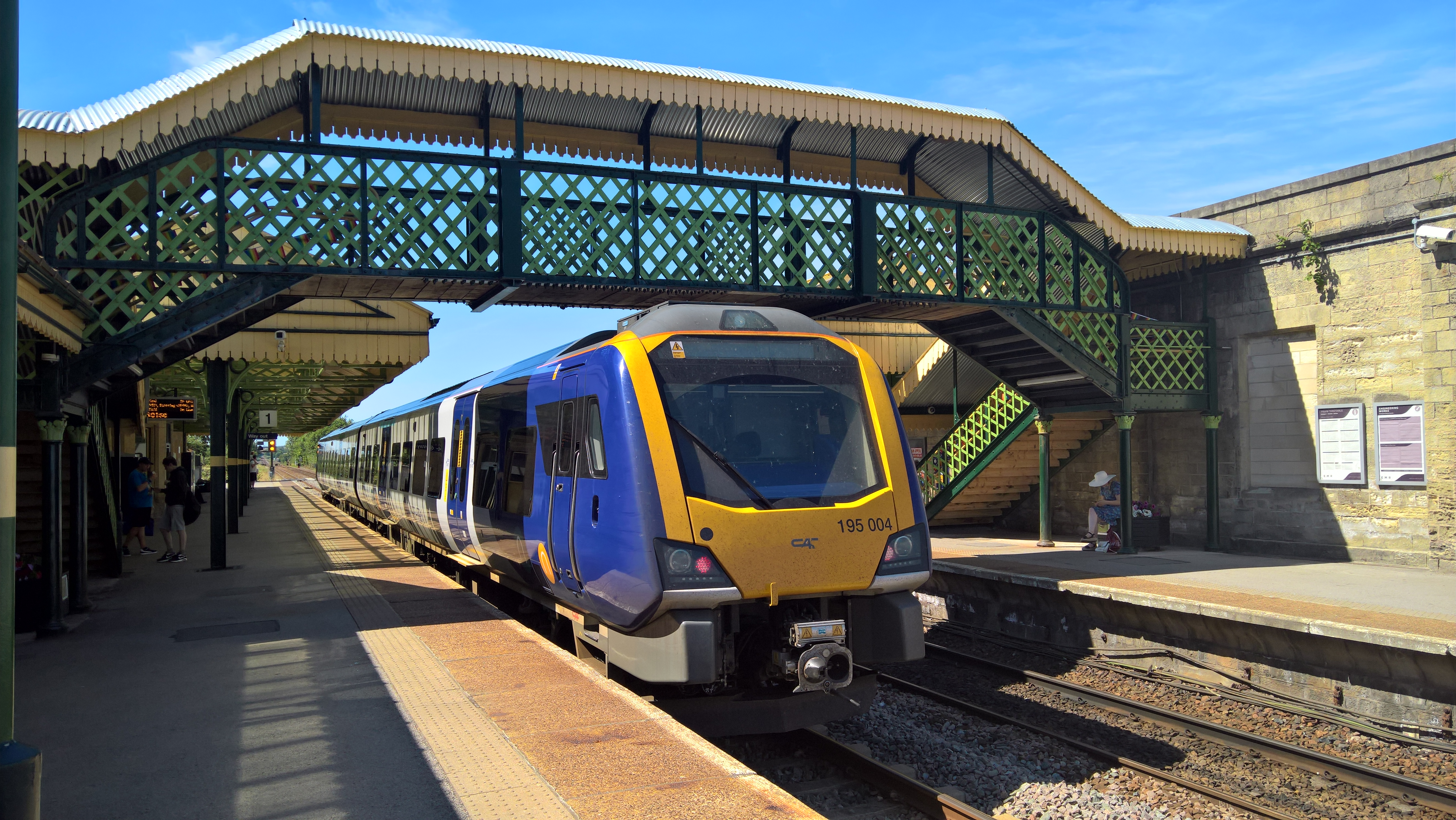
Worksop station

Worksop lies on the Sheffield-Lincoln line and the Robin Hood line. Northern services run between Sheffield, Lincoln and Leeds; East Midlands Railway services from Nottingham, via Mansfield, terminate at the station.

=== Roads ===
Worksop lies on the A57 and A60, with links to the A1 and M1. The A57 Worksop bypass was opened on Thursday 1 May 1986, by junior transport minister Michael Spicer and the Chairman of Bassetlaw council. The bypass had been due to open in October 1986 and was built by A.F. Budge of Retford; as part of the contract, a small part of the A60, Turner Road, was opened on Monday 29 September 1986, three months early.

=== Cycling ===
National Cycle Route 6, a waymarked route between London and the Lake District, passes through the town.

=== Buses ===
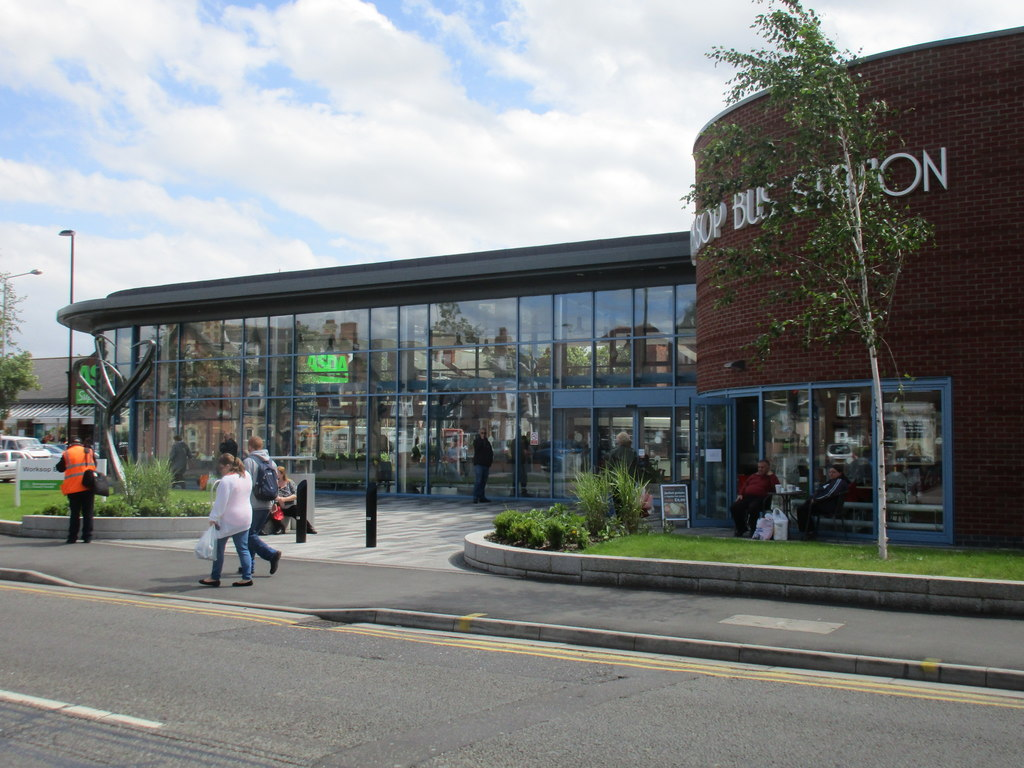
Worksop bus station

Stagecoach East Midlands operates bus services in and around the town, with destinations including Doncaster, Rotherham, Chesterfield and Nottingham. Worksop bus station is located on Watson Road and was rebuilt in 2015.

== Education ==
=== Primary ===
- Gateford Park Primary School
- Haggonfields Primary and Nursery School
- Holy Family Catholic Primary School
- Norbridge Academy
- Kingston Park Academy
- Langold Dyscarr Community School
- Prospect Hill Infant and Nursery School
- Prospect Hill Junior School
- Ramsden Primary School
- Redlands Primary and Nursery School
- Sparken Hill Academy
- Sir Edmund Hillary Academy
- The St Augustine's Academy
- St Anne's C of E Voluntary Aided Primary School
- St John's C of E Academy
- St Luke's C of E Aided Primary School
- Worksop Priory C of E Primary Academy
- The Primary School of St Mary and St Martin

=== Secondary ===
- Outwood Academy Portland
- Outwood Academy Valley
- Worksop College

=== Further education ===
- North Nottinghamshire College
- Outwood Post-16 centre

== Healthcare ==
Worksop is served by Bassetlaw District General Hospital, part of the Doncaster and Bassetlaw NHS Foundation Trust. Bassetlaw Hospital treats about 33,000 people each year, and roughly 38,000 emergencies. Bassetlaw Hospital is a University of Sheffield (Sheffield Medical School) teaching hospital.

Mental health services in Worksop are provided by Nottinghamshire Healthcare NHS Trust, which provide local community services. In-patient services are provided in Mansfield and Nottingham.

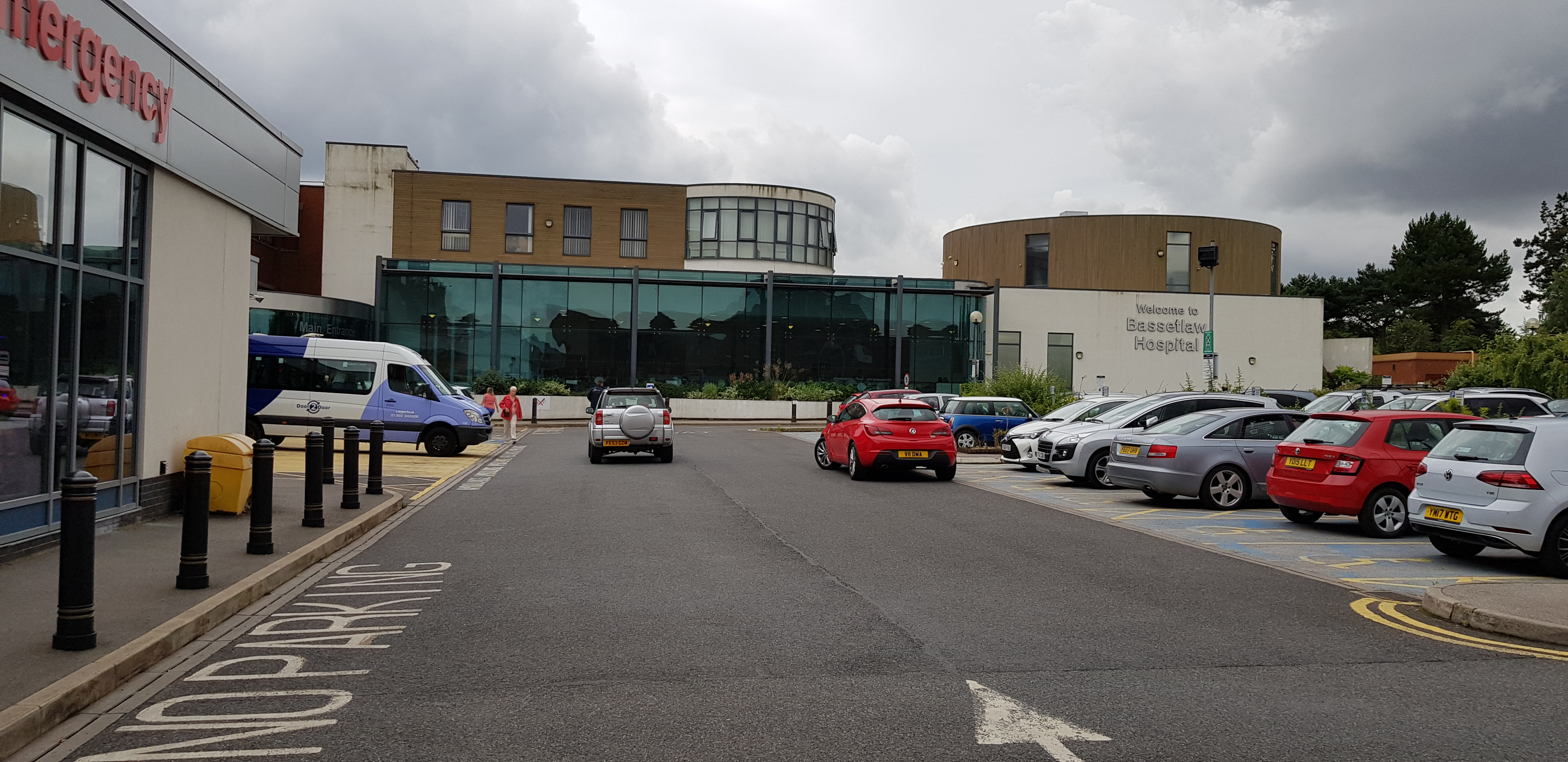
Bassetlaw Hospital

== Religion ==
Worksop has three churches, all of which are on the National Heritage List for England.

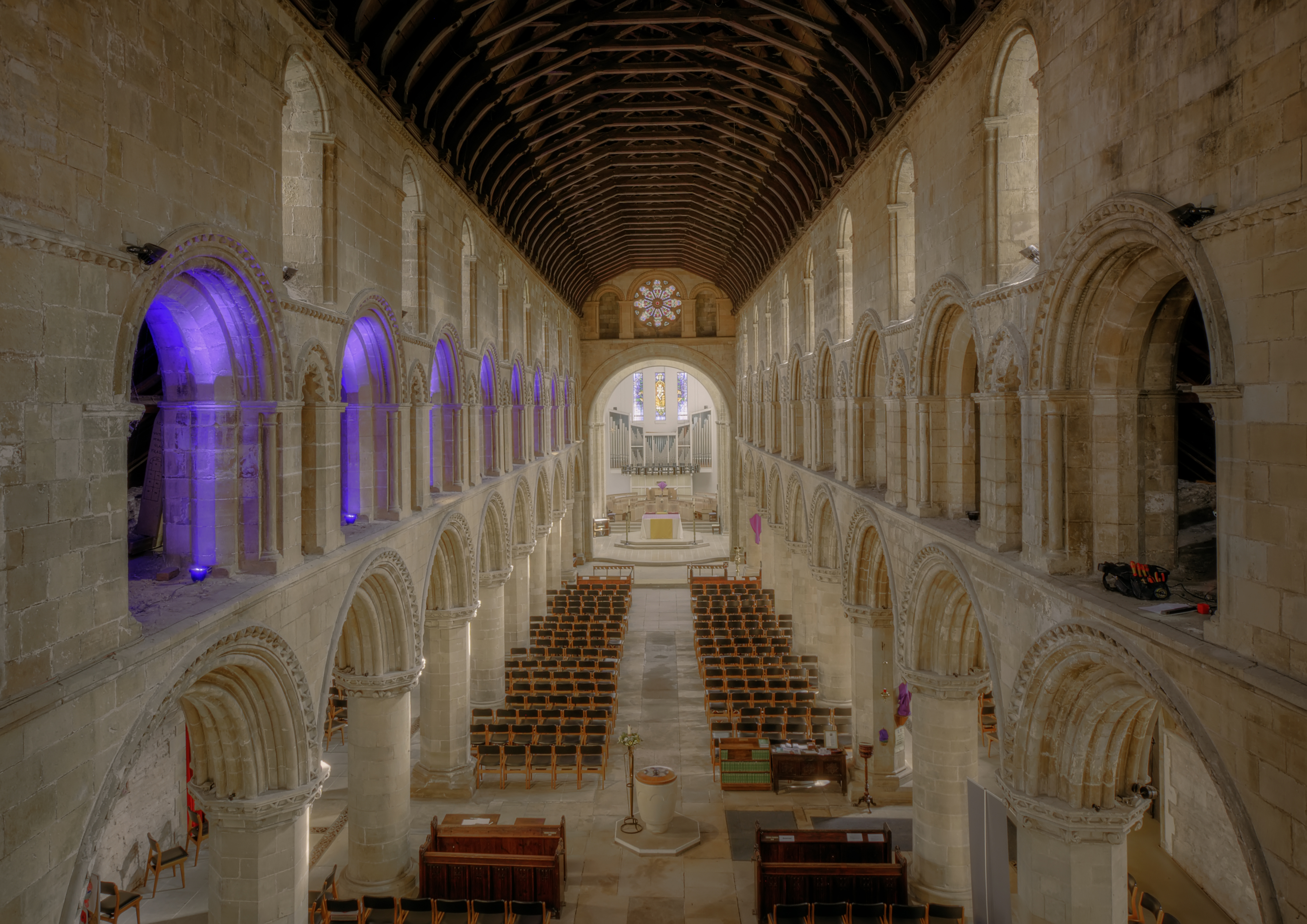
Worksop Priory Interior

Officially titled the Priory Church of Saint Mary and Saint Cuthbert, the Anglican parish church is usually known as Worksop Priory. It was an Augustinian priory founded in 1103. The church has a nave and detached gatehouse. Monks at the priory made the Tickhill Psalter, an illuminated manuscript of the medieval period, now held in New York Public Library. After the dissolution of the monasteries, the east end of the church fell into disrepair, but the townspeople were granted the nave as a parish church. The eastern parts of the building have been restored in several phases, the most recent being in the 1970s when architect Lawrence King rebuilt the crossing.

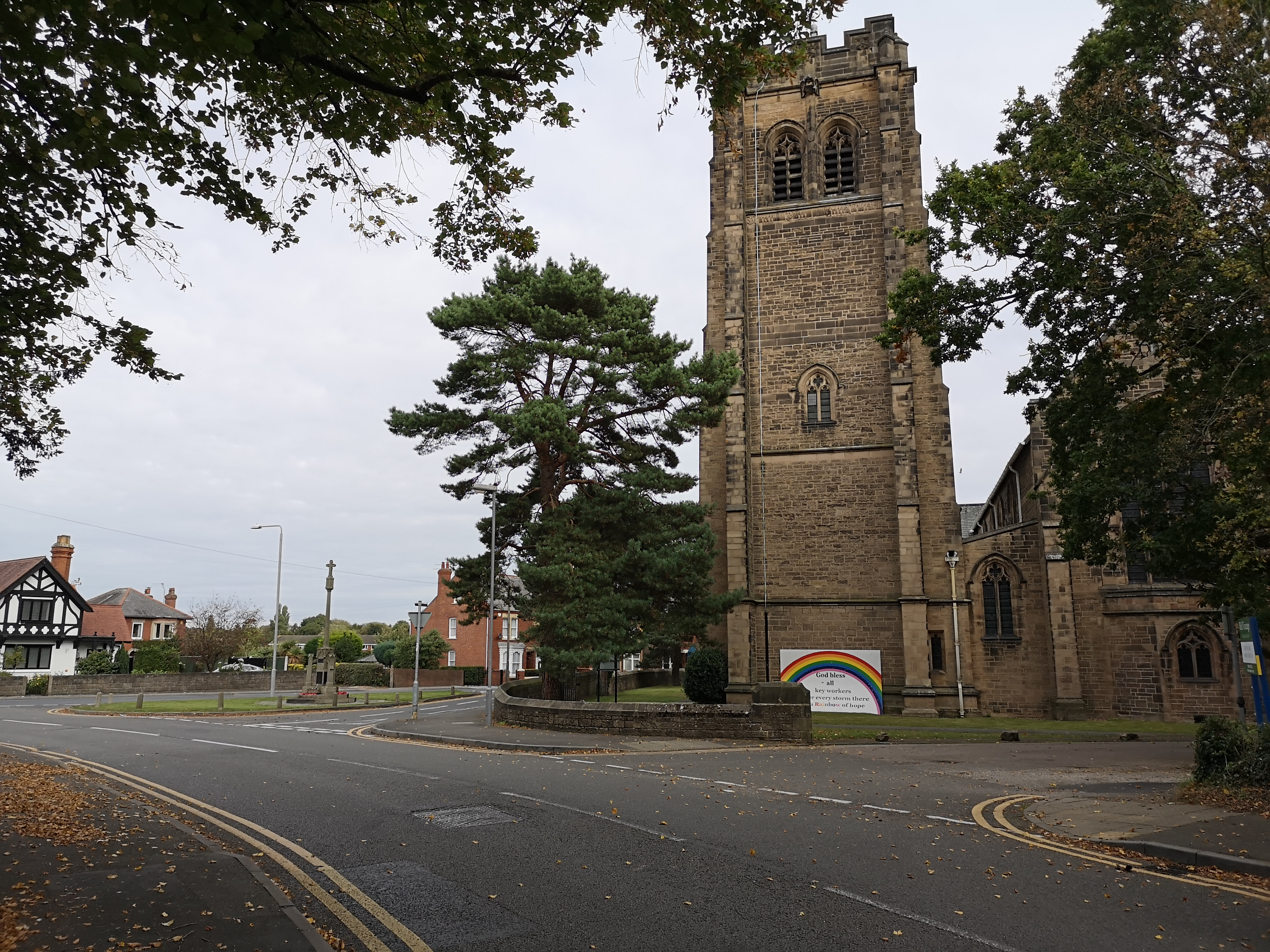
St Anne's Church

St. Anne's Church is an Anglican parish church and is recorded in the National Heritage List for England as a designated Grade-II listed building. The church was built in 1911 by the Lancaster architects Austin and Paley. The church has an historic pipe organ originally built by Gray and Davison in 1852 for the congregational church in Clapham.

St. John's Church is a parish church built between 1867 and 1868 by architect Robert Clarke.

St Mary's is a Roman Catholic church, built from 1838 to 1840 and paid for by the Bernard Howard, 12th Duke of Norfolk, after the sale of Worksop Manor, which the duke owned. The church was designed by Matthew Ellison Hadfield and it is a Grade II-listed building. In late 1913, the church was visited by Archduke Franz Ferdinand seven months before his assassination in Sarajevo.

Relatively few religious minorities live in the town, with the largest non-Christian community being Worksop's 243 Muslims. A small community and prayer centre for adherents is on Watson Road.

== Media ==
The town receives local news and television programmes from the BBC Yorkshire and ITV Yorkshire regions. Local radio stations are BBC Radio Sheffield on 104.1 FM, Greatest Hits Radio South Yorkshire on 107.9 FM, and Trust AM, an online hospital radio station serving the Bassetlaw District General Hospital in the town. The local newspapers are the Worksop Guardian and Worksop Wire.

== Places of interest ==
Clumber Park, located south of Worksop, is a country park, also owned by the National Trust. It has 3,800 acres of parkland.

Worksop Town Hall was originally established as a corn exchange, designed by Isaac Charles Gilbert and opened in 1851.

The Worksop War Memorial is a large Grade II* listed cenotaph dedicated to the memory of local residents that died during World War I and II.

Chesterfield Canal passes through Worksop and is used for activities.

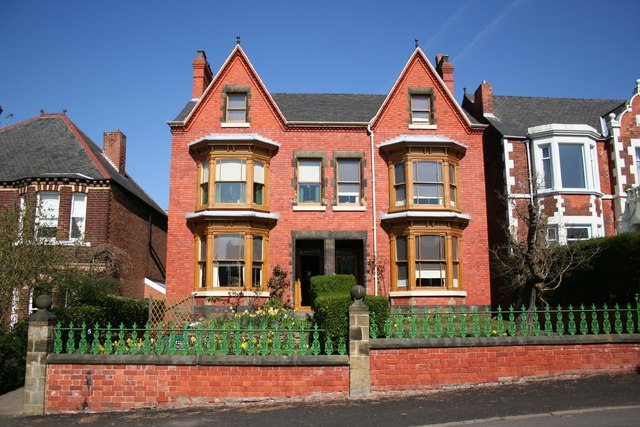
Mr Straw's House the family home of the Straw family, was inherited by the Straw brothers, William and Walter, when their parents died in the 1930s. The house remained unaltered until the National Trust acquired it in the 1990s and opened it to the public.

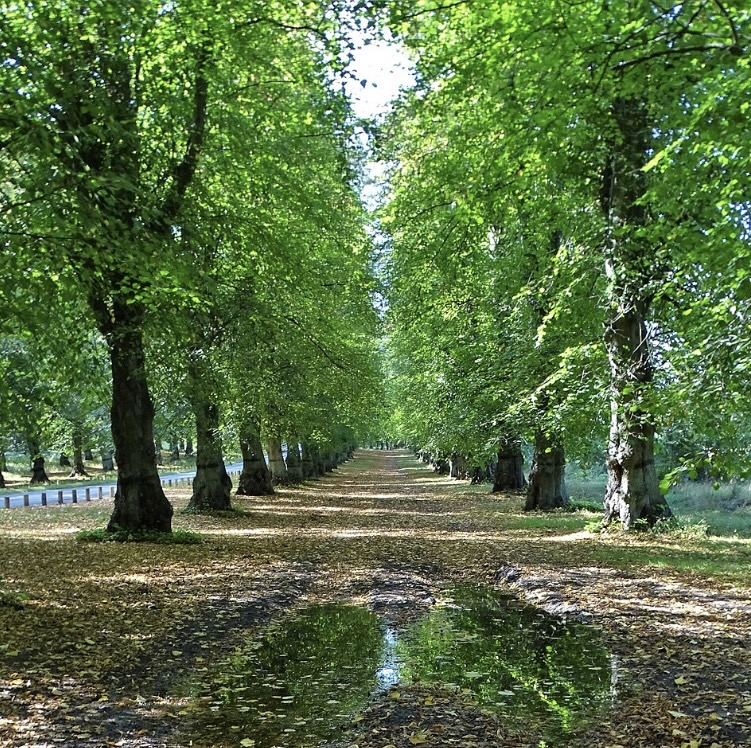
Clumber Park

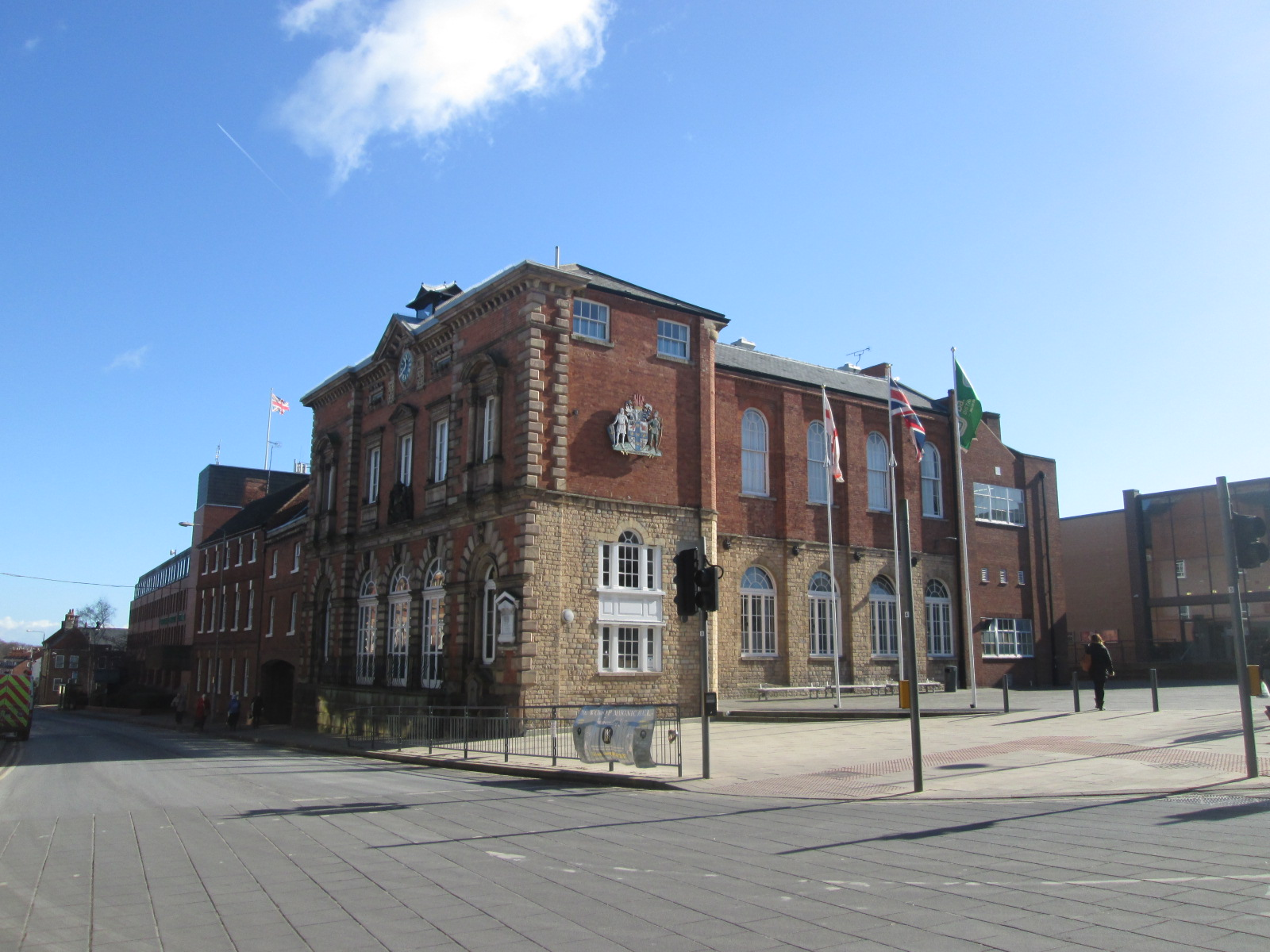
Worksop Town Hall

== Notable people ==
=== Actors and broadcasters ===
- A'Whora (real name George Boyle, b. 1996), drag queen, fashion designer and TV personality, known from RuPaul's Drag Race UK.
- Donald Pleasence (1919–1995), actor who starred in Halloween in 1978 and in 1981 Halloween II
- Anne Foy (b.1986), former BBC Children's TV presenter
- Sarah-Jane Honeywell (b.1974), BBC Children's TV presenter
- Richard Bacon, TV presenter, attended Worksop College.
- Richard Winsor, actor who starred in Casualty and Hollyoaks, attended Worksop College.
- Neil Dickson, actor who was educated in Worksop.

=== Artists and writers ===
- James Walsham Baldock (1822–1898), artist, adopted by his grandfather who was a farmer in Worksop
- Basil Boothroyd (1910–1988), humorous writer
- Gwen Grant (b.1940), writer

=== Singers and musicians ===
- Bruce Dickinson (b.1958), singer with Iron Maiden
- John Parr (b.1954), musician
- James Ivan Menzies (1896-1985), singer and actor with the D'Oyly Carte Opera Company and the J. C. Williamson Gilbert and Sullivan Opera Company in Australia.
- Martin Ellerby, composer who has performed at the BBC Proms.
- Rosalind Plowright, opera Singer.

=== Sports ===
- Lee Westwood (b.1973), golfer
- Adam Dixon, hockey player, educated at Worksop College
- Maurice Bembridge (1945-2024), golfer
- George A. Best, former goalkeeper with Blackpool F.C.
- Craig Disley (b.1981), footballer
- Mark Foster (b.1975), golfer
- Henry Haslam (1879–1942), footballer and Olympic gold medalist at the 1900 Olympics
- Mick Jones (b.1945), Sheffield United and Leeds United striker during the 1960s and 1970s
- Sam Osborne (b.1993), racing driver
- Liam Palmer (b.1991), Sheffield Wednesday Football Player
- Graham Taylor (1944–2017), former England, Aston Villa and Watford manager
- Danny Thomas (b.1961), footballer, played for Coventry City F.C. and Tottenham Hotspur
- Sam Walker (b.1995), table tennis player lives in the town.
- Darren Ward (b.1974), former football goalkeeper
- Elliott Whitehouse (b.1993), footballer
- Chris Wood (b.1987), footballer
- Henry Pickard (1832–1905), cricketer
- Will Kroos (b.1996), WWE wrestler

=== Others ===
- Anna Soubry Barrister and former politician attended education in the town.
- Alexina Graham (b.1990), model and Victoria's Secret Angel
- Chad Varah, founder of the Samaritans (charity) attended Worksop College
- William Henry Johnson (1890–1945), recipient of a Victoria Cross
- Kevan Jones, Baron Beamish, a member of the House of Lords since 2024.
- George Shirtcliffe, former businessman in New Zealand, and a founding member of the New Zealand Red Cross.
- Rory Palmer, politician and former Member of the European Parliament.

== See also ==
- Listed buildings in Worksop
