= St Mary's Church, Worksop =

St Mary's Church
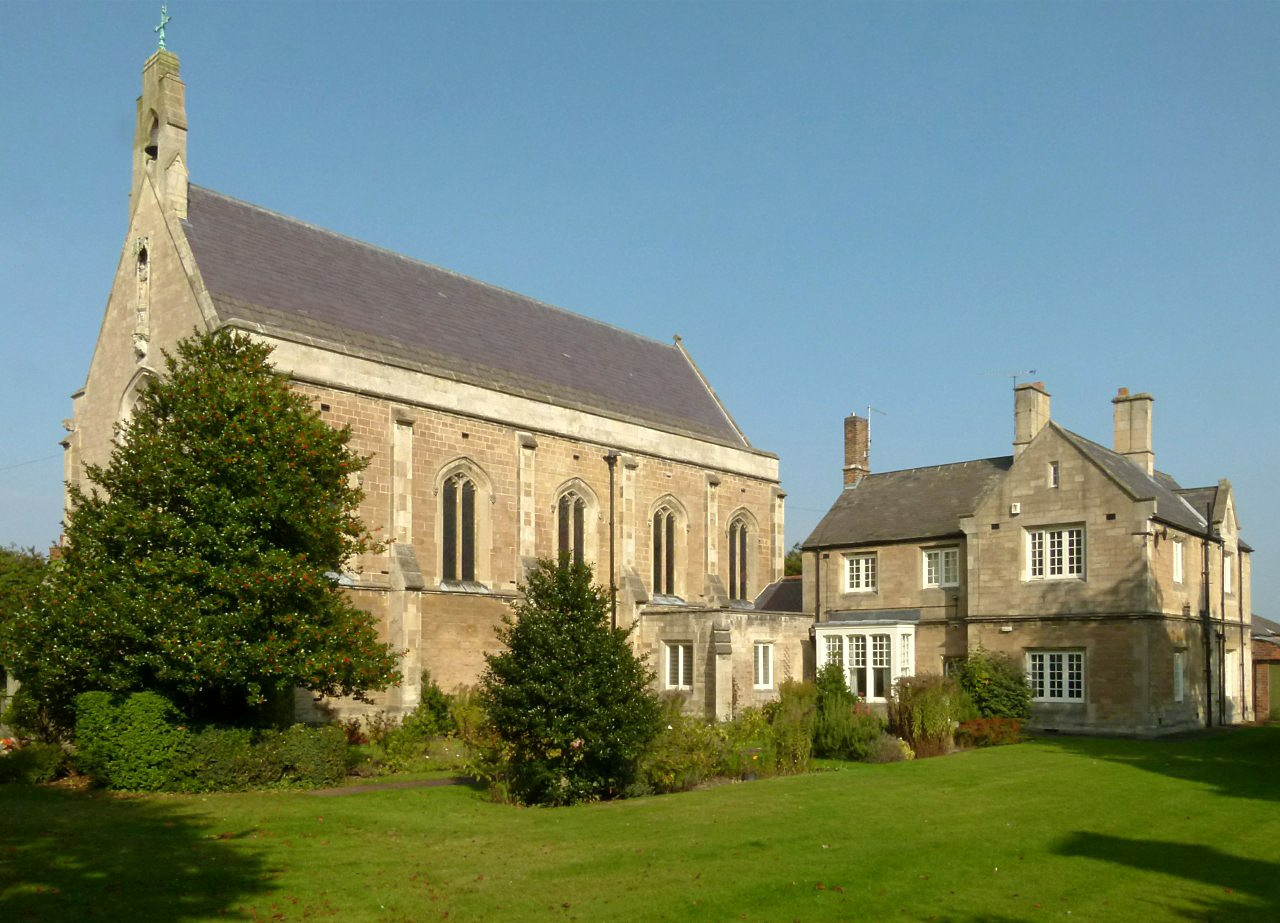
- St Mary's Church
- 53.2992°N 1.1231°W
- OS grid reference: SK 58558 78377
- Location: Worksop
- Country: England
- Denomination: Roman Catholic
- Website: StJudesHallam.co.uk

History
- Status: Active
- Founder: Duke of Norfolk
- Dedication: Mary, mother of Jesus
- Consecrated: 24 March 1926

Architecture
- Functional status: Parish church
- Heritage designation: Grade II listed
- Designated: 1 April 1985
- Architect: Weightman and Hadfield
- Style: Gothic Revival
- Groundbreaking: 29 October 1838
- Completed: 26 February 1840

Administration
- Province: Liverpool
- Diocese: Hallam
- Deanery: Bassetlaw
- Parish: St Jude's Worksop-Oldcotes

St Mary's Church is a Roman Catholic parish church in Worksop, Nottinghamshire, England. It was built from 1838 to 1840 by Weightman and Hadfield in the Gothic Revival style. It is located on Park Street to the south of the town centre. It was paid for by Bernard Howard, 12th Duke of Norfolk after the sale of Worksop Manor and was once visited by Archduke Franz Ferdinand. It is a Grade II listed building.

== History ==
=== Foundation ===
After the Reformation, in the early eighteenth century, local Catholics in Worksop had to go a chapel in Worksop Manor to celebrate Mass. In 1743, it was recorded that the total number of Catholics in Worksop was 23. In 1748, a priest was resident there at Worksop Manor. Around 1780, Charles Howard, 10th Duke of Norfolk paid for a Catholic chapel and a presbytery in Sandhill Dyke. The building survives today as Park Farm.

=== Construction ===
In 1838, Bernard Howard, 12th Duke of Norfolk sold Worksop Manor to Henry Pelham-Clinton, 6th Duke of Newcastle for £375,000. That year he paid for the construction of the current church and presbytery. On 29 October 1838, the foundation stone was laid by Michael Ellison, the duke's agent and uncle of Matthew Ellison Hadfield, one the church's architect, the other being John Grey Weightman. On 26 February 1840, the church was opened by Bishop Thomas Walsh, the Vicar Apostolic of the Midland District. The church was designed in the Gothic Revival style.

=== Developments ===
In 1870, Henry Fitzalan-Howard, 15th Duke of Norfolk paid for the church to be improved and added a new sacristy, confessional and heating system. The architect of the improvements was again Matthew Ellison Hadfield. In late 1913, Archduke Franz Ferdinand and his wife Sophie, Duchess of Hohenberg were invited to stay at nearby Welbeck Abbey for a week by William Cavendish-Bentinck, 6th Duke of Portland and attended Mass in the church. On 24 March 1926, the church was consecrated. In 2012, the National Lottery Heritage Fund gave £110,000 to the church for repairs.

== Parish ==
In 2007, the parish was merged with nearby St Joseph's Church in Worksop. It is now the parish of St Jude and includes St Mary's Church, St Joseph's Church and St Helen's Church in Oldcotes. St Mary's Church has one Sunday Mass at 11:00am. St Joseph's Church has one Sunday Mass at 6:00pm on Saturday and St Helen's Church in Oldcotes has one Sunday Mass at 9:00am. Daily Mass is 10.00am on a Wednesday at St Mary's, 10.00am on a Thursday at St Joseph's and 10.00am on a Friday at St. Helen's

== Exterior ==
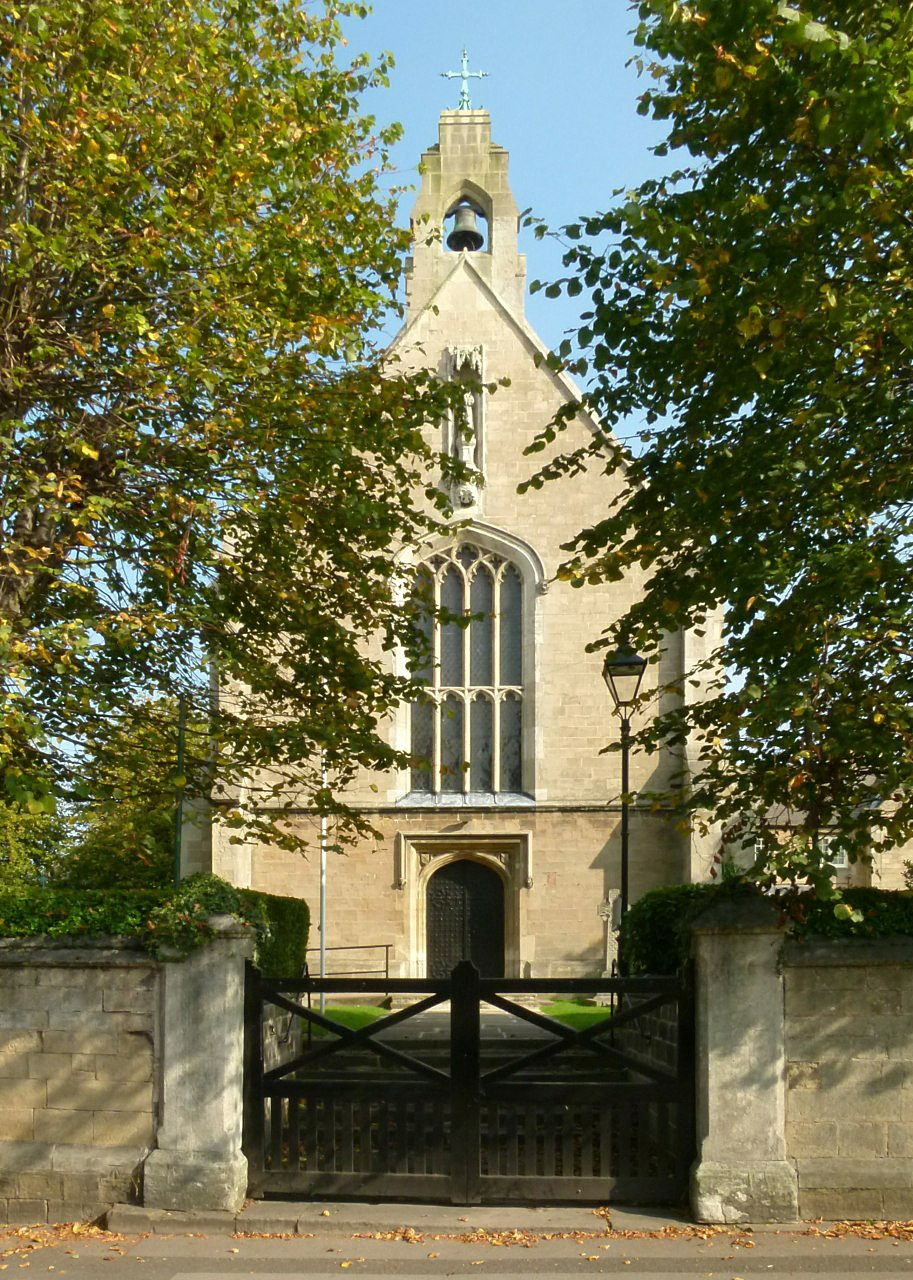
Front of church

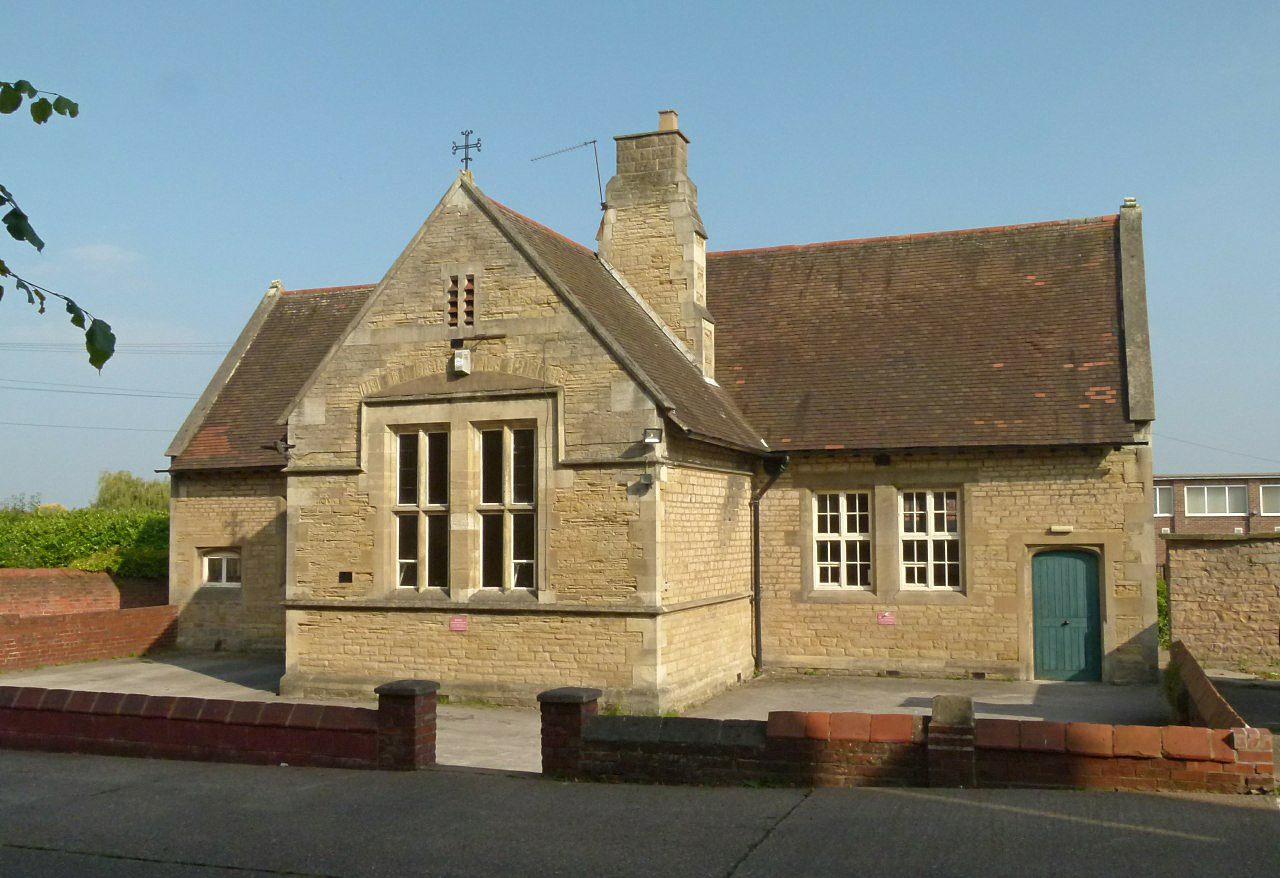
Church hall

== See also ==
- Diocese of Hallam
- Listed buildings in Worksop
- Media related to St Mary's Church, Worksop at Wikimedia Commons
