= George A. Best =

English footballer

George Best
Personal information
- Full name: George Arthur Best
- Place of birth: Worksop, England
- Position: Goalkeeper

Senior career*
Years	Team	Apps	(Gls)
- Worksop Town
1926–1927	Blackpool	27	(0)
- Worksop Town
- * Club domestic league appearances and goals

George Arthur Best (birth and death dates unknown) was an English professional footballer who played as a goalkeeper. He is best known for his time with Blackpool in the Football League during the 1920s, while also featuring for his hometown club Worksop Town before and after his spell at Blackpool.

== Early life ==
Best was born in Worksop, Nottinghamshire, England. Details about his early life and youth career remain scarce, but he began playing football locally with Worksop Town as an amateur.

== Club career ==
Best started his professional career with Blackpool, joining from Worksop Town. He made his Football League debut for Blackpool during the 1925–26 season, stepping in as a deputy for regular goalkeeper Len Crompton. His first appearance came in a 5–2 away defeat to Derby County. He retained his place for the next two matches: a 3–0 home win against Bradford City and a 5–0 loss at Port Vale. Crompton then reclaimed his spot.

In the subsequent 1926–27 season, Best became more involved, making 24 League appearances. His final game for Blackpool was on 18 April 1927, a 2–2 draw away at South Shields. Over his time at the club, he accumulated 27 League appearances without scoring any goals.

After leaving Blackpool, Best returned to Worksop Town, where he continued his career at a non-League level. No further details on his later playing days or retirement are documented.
