= James Walsham Baldock =

English painter (1822–1898)

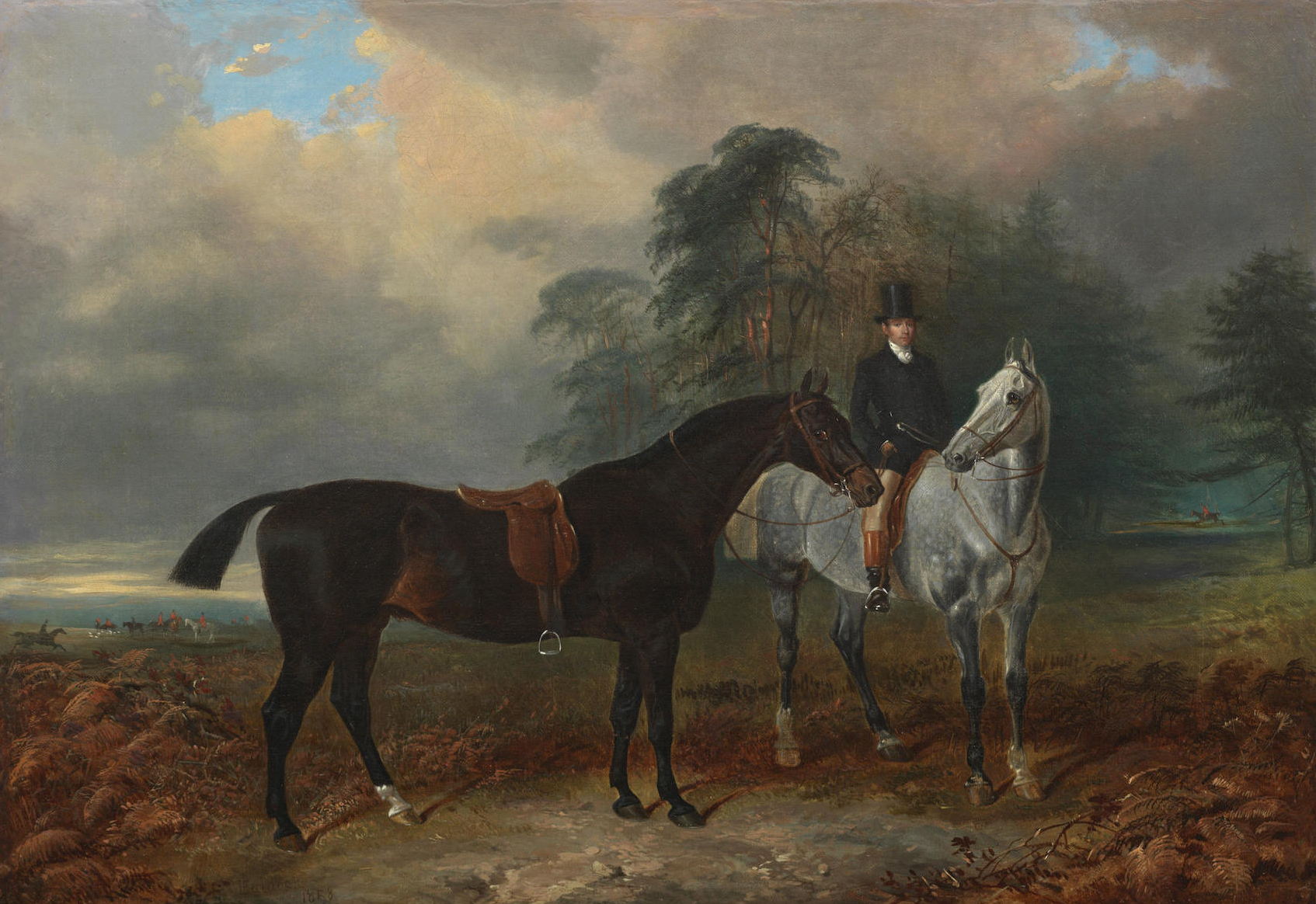
James Walsham Baldock - The Hunters at Rest -

James Walsham Baldock (1822–1898) was an English painter of horses, most frequently hunters, shooting scenes, sporting dogs and Highland scenes.

== Life and work ==
Baldock was born James Walsham Markham in 1822 at Tadcaster after which he was orphaned and adopted by his maternal grandfather, a farmer, whose name Baldock he took. His maternal grandson Charles Edwin Baldock, as well adopted by his grandfather, was also a painter. James Walsham Baldock's English and Irish commissions included those for Garnett of Arch Hall ("Mrs Samuel Garnett mounted on a bay hunter with her two sons, John and Samuel mounted on ponies, outside Arch Hall, County Meath"), Pollock of Mountainstown, Pratt of Cabra Castle, the 6th Viscount Galway of Serlby or the 5th Duke of Portland. He worked in oil, watercolour, gouache and pastel. The best of his work dates from 1850 to 1860, and was mainly in oils, some of which is comparable to the other leading sporting artists of his time. From about 1870 he seems to have turned almost entirely to pastoral scenes, many depicting cattle and sheep.

He was one of the founder members and later President of the Sheffield Society of Artists.
