= Neale Andrew =

English sculptor

Neale Andrew (born 1958) is an English sculptor. He has created many portrait sculptures, particularly of sportspeople; commissioned works stand in locations in Britain.

== Life ==
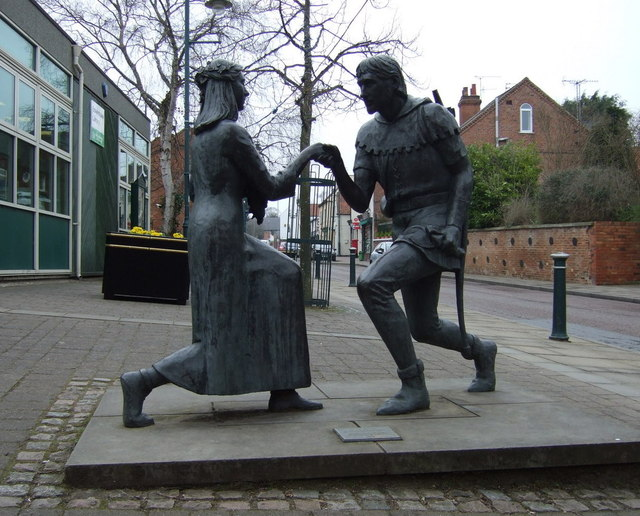
Robin Hood and Maid Marian, in Edwinstowe

Andrew was born in Northampton; he studied at Blackpool Collegeof Art, and gained an honours degree in fine art from Trent Polytechnic in 1980. He is a member of the Royal Society of Sculptors.

== Works ==
Andrew's works include the following:

"Robin Hood and Maid Marian" is a bronze sculpture in High Street, Edwinstowe, Nottinghamshire, funded by Nottinghamshire County Council and unveiled in 1998.

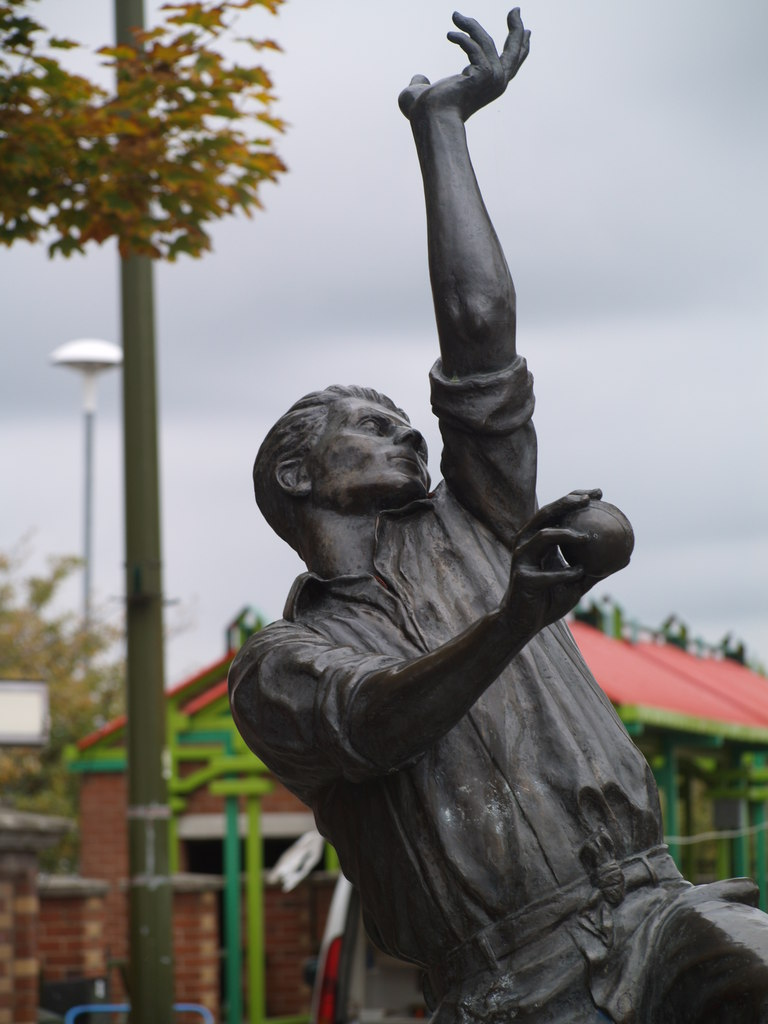
Part-view of Harold Larwood statue in Kirkby-in-Ashfield market area in 2009 before its 2015 nearby relocation

"Three Cricketers", near the public library of Kirkby-in-Ashfield, Nottinghamshire, is a group of bronze statues, of Harold Larwood (created by Andrew in 2002) with William Voce and Donald Bradman (both created by David Annand in 2015). They are shown in a cricket match during the bodyline series of 1932–1933 in Australia. Larwood and Voce were both born near Kirkby-in-Ashfield.

A bronze statue of the Olympic rower Sir Steve Redgrave stands in Higginson Park in Marlow, Buckinghamshire. It was unveiled on 10 May 2002 by Queen Elizabeth II.

A bronze bust of Sir John Major, made in 1993, became part of the Parliamentary Art Collection in 2004.

A bronze statue of Robin Hood with bow drawn, height 3.04 metres (10.0 ft), is in the terminal building of Doncaster Sheffield Airport, also known as Robin Hood Airport. It was commissioned for the terminal building, and was unveiled on 28 February 2007 by Sean Bean and Brian Blessed.

Other sculptures of sportspeople include busts of Dickie Bird, Sir Geoffrey Boycott, Sir Alec Bedser and Gary Lineker.
