= Worksop War Memorial =

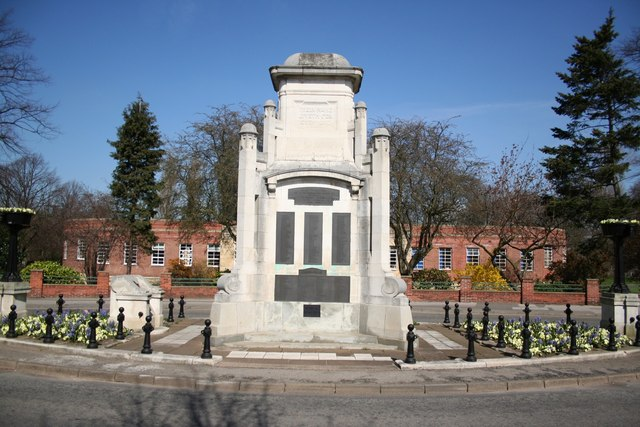
- Worksop War Memorial

- Location in Nottinghamshire
- 53°18′15″N 1°07′09″W
- Location: Worksop, Nottinghamshire, England

Listed Building – Grade II*
- Official name: War Memorial
- Designated: 1 April 1985
- Reference no.: 1045751

Worksop War Memorial is a 20th-century grade II* listed war memorial in Worksop, Nottinghamshire.

== History ==
The war memorial is a cenotaph constructed from Portland stone on a base of Aberdeen granite. It consists of a rectangular block in two stages, over which is a rectangular domed cap with a moulded cornice. The block is supported by flying buttresses with scrolled feet, domed caps and cross motifs. On the front and rear are bronze plaques with inscriptions, and the names of those lost in the two World Wars. To the west is a monument in the form of a lectern commemorating the Sherwood Foresters Regiment.

The memorial has been Grade II* listed since 1 April 1985.

== See also ==
- Listed buildings in Worksop
