= Grimsby Tennis Centre =

English tennis club

Coordinates: 53°33′8″N 0°4′34″W

Court and clubhouse

Grimsby Tennis Centre is a tennis club in Grimsby, Lincolnshire, England. It was founded by members of the Welholme Methodist Church on grass courts in Welholme Road, Grimsby. In order to protect the membership from personal liability the club was formed into a Limited Company (Company number 00179077) on 16 January 1922. The land in Weelsby Avenue was purchased in April 1922 and so the tennis facility on this site predates the surrounding houses that were built in about 1930. Although the Tennis Centre is a Limited Company, its constitution requires that any profits are used to improve the facility. Elected Directors serve for a period as defined in the Memorandum and Articles of Association.

== Early development of the site ==
Clubhouse of the Grimsby Tennis Centre

The former pavilion was of timber; electricity was only installed in 1960 to replace gas lighting. The former bar, towards the right-hand side of the photograph, was erected and opened in 1959 as an addition to the pavilion and it was enlarged a mere 4 years later. Some land at the rear of the former pavilion was purchased in 1961 and land adjacent to the drive was bought as a turf nursery in 1955.

A tennis practice wall was built in 1972 and the squash court was built in 1973. It was the second squash court in the town and was erected to meet the rising need. Now the boom in squash has subsided and the court is used for mini tennis and racquetball.

Two hard courts were built in 1984 after the former red shale courts had given good service. In fact they had given more than good service. Each time they were used they had to be dragged and sifting out the large pieces of 'clinker' became a regular occupation. After all of this work it was inevitable that you would travel home with red socks and red legs caused by the fine dust.

== Change from grass ==
Major development involving erection of a new clubhouse, floodlights, construction of the car park and replacing the grass courts with Tennisweave synthetic grass carpet took place in 1989 after months of careful planning. This high specification artificial grass surface, unlike many synthetic carpet courts, uses very little sand, which therefore provides a good foothold. To finance the £100,000 project, two grass courts nearest to Weelsby Avenue were sold for housing.

== Leading to success ==
The success of the development produced results on the court and in 1991/92 the Men's teams were particularly successful. The First Team won the Lincolnshire Men's First Division for the first time in the Club's history and the Men's Third Team were promoted to the Third Division. Players in the squad were: Trevor Kelly, Tim Smith, Andrew Lashbrook, Allan Thompson, Jamie Thompson (15), Duncan Proctor.

Further progress and development at the site was made in 1993 with the successful application for a Sports Aid Grant which allowed the laying of two all-weather synthetic grass courts to replace the worn out hard courts. The new synthetic grass is different from that already laid with more sand providing a higher bounce during wet weather in particular.

In 1994/5, for the first time in its history, the North Kelsey League allowed a Grimsby team to enter the League and Welholme had the honour.

1996/7 saw a Men's veterans team successfully enter a new Lincolnshire Veterans' League, coming second by the width of a sideline at the first attempt.

The Peaks Parkway was completed and opened to traffic in October, 1998 and the eastern boundary of the Club was made more secure.

March 1999 saw the Men's Veteran's Team finally achieve their reward for some difficult matches and long journeys by winning the Lincolnshire Veterans' League.

== Lottery funding ==
Directors of the Club embraced the Lawn Tennis Association's Club Vision programme and began work on development of the Club. There are practically no tennis facilities for the disabled and part of the development of the club would address this issue in North Lincolnshire. Detailed and lengthy submissions were made to the Sports Aid Foundation, the National Lottery, the Football Trust and Foundation for Sports and the Arts. Support for the bid was forthcoming from the LTA and a huge redevelopment of the Club started in August 2003. The development, costing £250,000 saw the whole site under construction work. All of the courts were replaced; four synthetic grass courts so enjoyed by players of all abilities, two floodlit acrylic courts as used in the US Open, which are especially good for wheelchair tennis, and a state of the art Club House with ample luxurious accommodation.

=== Project leader ===
The project was led from start to finish by Andrew Lashbrook, who was subsequently offered position by the charities funding the work. The grand opening was on 12 April 2003.

== Change of name ==
In recognition of the scale of the development and the place of the facility as the leading tennis and squash venue in Grimsby, Cleethorpes and the area of North Lincolnshire, the Club changed the name to Grimsby Tennis Centre.

The name derived from Grimsby Tennis Club which used to be the premier location for the sport in North Lincolnshire and which hosted many Lincolnshire Closed Tournaments at their grounds in College Street, Grimsby before the memberships dwindled and the land was eventually sold for housing development. Many notable players started their tennis careers at the College Street courts; Shirley Bloomer, Eric King and several local players of high repute in Lincolnshire and beyond:- Bernard Finneran, Matt Sheader, Bill and Connie Moran. Peter Brown and many more. The traditions of the old Club are maintained in the new facilities at Grimsby Tennis Centre.
