= Weelsby Road Halt railway station =

Former railway station in Lincolnshire, England

Coordinates: 53.5538°N 0.0760°W

Weelsby Road Halt

General information
- Location: Weelsby, North East Lincolnshire; England
- Grid reference: TA275081
- Platforms: 2

Other information
- Status: Disused

History
- Original company: Great Northern Railway
- Post-grouping: London and North Eastern Railway; Eastern Region of British Railways

Key dates
- 11 December 1905: Opened
- 1 January 1940: Last train
- 10 March 1952: Official closure
- December 1980: Closure of line
Location

Weelsby Road Halt was a railway halt on the East Lincolnshire Railway which served the Weelsby Road area of eastern Grimsby in Lincolnshire between 1905 and 1940. The station was opened as part of a new motor train service between Grimsby and Louth. It was the site of major works in 1933 when a plate girder bridge was constructed to replace a level crossing, enabling road traffic to pass underneath through a subway. The station closed in 1952 following a period of temporary closure during the Second World War. The line through Weelsby remained open for freight until December 1980. The trackbed was later reused by Humberside County Council to construct the A16 Peaks Parkway which now runs through the site. Building of the road put an end to the aspirations of the Great Northern and East Lincolnshire Railway plc (now the Lincolnshire Wolds Railway) to reopen the line as a heritage railway.

== History ==
The station was opened on 11 December 1905 to coincide with the introduction of a motor train service on the East Lincolnshire Railway by the Great Northern Railway. It consisted of two low facing halt platforms to the south of a level crossing over Weelsby Road within the Grimsby town boundary. A small single-storey timber waiting shelter was provided on the up platform, opposite which was a signal box to control the crossing. A crossing keeper's cottage, similar in style to others on the line, lay to the north of the crossing.

By 1914, the crossing was causing problems for traffic on Weelsby Road and a proposal was made to replace it with a subway. The First World War put an end to these plans and although the matter was raised again in 1919, it was not until May 1933 that works to construct the subway began under the oversight of the London and North Eastern Railway. The improvement scheme was completed at a cost of £20,000 (£1.79 million in 2023), with the works being carried out by Fletcher & Co. of Mansfield. A 200 tonnes (200 long tons) plate girder bridge replaced the level crossing, allowing the traffic to pass under via a subway. The works, which were completed a month ahead of schedule in December 1933, required the demolition of the crossing keeper's cottage. The upgraded crossing was opened by the Mayor of Grimsby in early December 1933, who was driven under the bridge in a double-decker bus.

The station, at which trains only called upon request, closed as a temporary wartime measure in 1940, with the last train calling on 1 January. Official closure came on 10 March 1952.

Preceding station	Disused railways	Following station
Hainton Street Halt; Line and station closed	Great Northern Railway; East Lincolnshire Line	Waltham; Line and station closed

== Present day ==
Tracklifting commenced in early 1981, with the section between Grimsby and Waltham - constructed of bullhead rail - being the last to be removed. This section was designated by Humberside County Council for the building of the A16 Peaks Parkway. The roadworks, which run directly through the site of Weelsby Road Halt, put an end to hopes by the Great Northern and East Lincolnshire Railway plc, a preservation society now known as the Lincolnshire Wolds Railway, to reopen the line to Grimsby.

== Sources ==
- Butt, R. V. J. (October 1995). The Directory of Railway Stations: details every public and private passenger station, halt, platform and stopping place, past and present (1st ed.). Sparkford: Patrick Stephens Ltd. ISBN 978-1-85260-508-7. OCLC 60251199. OL 11956311M.
- Clinker, C.R. (October 1978). Clinker's Register of Closed Passenger Stations and Goods Depots in England, Scotland and Wales 1830-1977. Bristol: Avon-Anglia Publications & Services. ISBN 0-905466-19-5.
- Conolly, W. Philip (2004) [1958]. British Railways Pre-Grouping Atlas and Gazetteer. Hersham, Surrey: Ian Allan Ltd. ISBN 978-0-7110-0320-0.
- Goode, C.T. (1985). The Railways of North Lincolnshire. Anlaby, Hull: C.T. Goode. ISBN 978-0-9508239-7-3.
- King, P.K.; Hewins, D.R. (1998) [1989]. The Railways around Grimsby, Cleethorpes, Immingham & North-East Lincolnshire. Romiley, Stockport: Foxline Publishing. ISBN 978-1-870119-04-7.
- Ludlam, A.J. (1991). The East Lincolnshire Railway (OL82). Headington, Oxford: The Oakwood Press. ISBN 0-85361-416-4.
- Stennett, Alan (2007). Lost Railways of Lincolnshire. Newbury, Berkshire: Countryside Books. ISBN 978-1-84674-040-4.
