= Hainton Street Halt railway station =

Former railway station in Lincolnshire, England

Coordinates: 53.5585°N 0.0779°W

Hainton Street Halt

General information
- Location: Grimsby, North East Lincolnshire; England
- Grid reference: TA274085
- Platforms: 2

Other information
- Status: Disused

History
- Original company: Great Northern Railway
- Post-grouping: London and North Eastern Railway; Eastern Region of British Railways

Key dates
- 11 December 1905: Opened
- 4 December 1939: Temporary closure
- 1 March 1940: Reopened
- 11 September 1961: Closed
- December 1980: Closure of line
Location

Hainton Street Halt was a railway halt on the East Lincolnshire Railway which served the Welholme Road area of Grimsby in Lincolnshire between 1905 and 1961. The station was opened as part of a new motor train service between Grimsby and Louth. The station briefly closed in 1939 as a Second World War economy measure, but reopened in 1940. The line through Hainton Street remained open for freight until December 1980. The trackbed was later reused by Humberside County Council to construct the A16 Peaks Parkway which now runs through the site. Building of the road put an end to the aspirations of the Great Northern and East Lincolnshire Railway plc (now the Lincolnshire Wolds Railway) to reopen the line as a heritage railway.

== History ==
The station was opened on 11 December 1905 to coincide with the introduction of a motor train service on the East Lincolnshire Railway by the Great Northern Railway. It was one of six halts opened at this time; each had short low platforms reached from the steam railcars by a set of specially-fitted steps. Hainton Street Halt consisted of two low facing halt platforms to the south of a level crossing over Welholme Road within the Grimsby town boundary. It took its name after Hainton Road, now the B1213 Hainton Avenue, which ran parallel to the east side of the line. A timber waiting shelter was provided on the up platform, adjacent to a signal box which controlled the level crossing. A crossing keeper's cottage lay just beyond.

To the north of the station lay Grimsby Goods Junction (154 mi 49.25 chains or 248.83 km from London King's Cross), at which point the East Lincolnshire Line ended, forking left into Grimsby Town station via Garden Street Junction and right to Pasture Street signal box and the Cleethorpes line.

The station, at which trains only called upon request, closed as a temporary wartime measure on 4 December 1939, but was reopened on 1 March 1940. Final closure came on 11 September 1961 with the withdrawal of the railmotor service.

== Present day ==
Tracklifting commenced in early 1981, with the section between Grimsby and Waltham - constructed of bullhead rail - being the last to be removed. This section was designated by Humberside County Council for the building of the A16 Peaks Parkway. The roadworks, which run directly through the site of Hainton Street Halt, put an end to hopes by the Great Northern and East Lincolnshire Railway plc, a preservation society now known as the Lincolnshire Wolds Railway, to reopen the line to Grimsby. The Hainton Street signal box, which was the last of its kind to survive between Louth North crossing and Garden Street Junction, was set on fire by vandals in 1991 and destroyed.

== Sources ==
- Butt, R. V. J. (October 1995). The Directory of Railway Stations: details every public and private passenger station, halt, platform and stopping place, past and present (1st ed.). Sparkford: Patrick Stephens Ltd. ISBN 978-1-85260-508-7. OCLC 60251199. OL 11956311M.
- Clinker, C.R. (October 1978). Clinker's Register of Closed Passenger Stations and Goods Depots in England, Scotland and Wales 1830-1977. Bristol: Avon-Anglia Publications & Services. ISBN 0-905466-19-5.
- Conolly, W. Philip (2004) [1958]. British Railways Pre-Grouping Atlas and Gazetteer. Hersham, Surrey: Ian Allan Ltd. ISBN 978-0-7110-0320-0.
- Goode, C.T. (1985). The Railways of North Lincolnshire. Anlaby, Hull: C.T. Goode. ISBN 978-0-9508239-7-3.
- King, P.K.; Hewins, D.R. (1998) [1989]. The Railways around Grimsby, Cleethorpes, Immingham & North-East Lincolnshire. Romiley, Stockport: Foxline Publishing. ISBN 978-1-870119-04-7.
- Ludlam, A.J. (1991). The East Lincolnshire Railway (OL82). Headington, Oxford: The Oakwood Press. ISBN 0-85361-416-4.
- Stennett, Alan (2007). Lost Railways of Lincolnshire. Newbury, Berkshire: Countryside Books. ISBN 978-1-84674-040-4.

| Preceding station | Disused railways | Following station |
|---|---|---|
| Grimsby Town; Line closed, station open | Great Northern Railway; East Lincolnshire Line | Weelsby Road Halt; Line and station closed |
