= Weelsby =

Suburb of Grimsby, Lincolnshire, England

Coordinates: 53.553°N 0.065°W

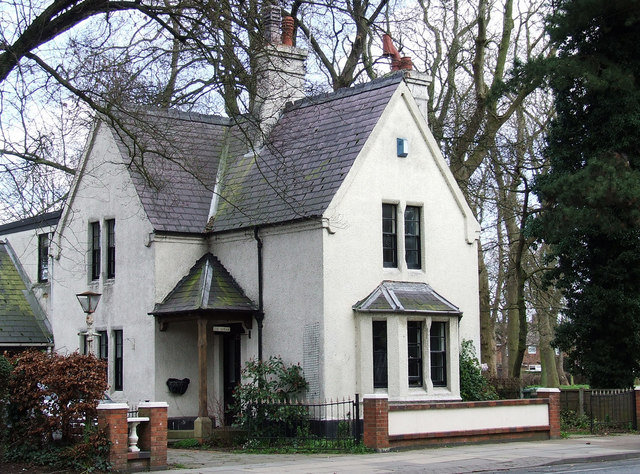
'The Lodge' in Weelsby Road.

Weelsby is located in the Weelsby Road area of eastern Grimsby, North East Lincolnshire, England. Previously separate from Grimsby, Weelsby Woods and Weelsby Hall lie within the area, as does the Grimsby Tennis Centre, Peaks Lane fire station, Saint Andrews Hospice, Saint Hughs Hospital and the local branch of the YMCA. It is home to a local drama group, the Weelsby Players and Weelsby Park Riding School. There is a Weelsby Tenants and Residents Association, which is represented on the Boroughwide Tenants Assembly.

Nearby is the King George V Stadium. Weelsby Hall is a late Victorian mansion house built by the Sleight family in 1890 and is now part of the Linkage Community Trust, a charity supporting people with learning difficulties and disabilities. The Hall is part of Linkage's Weelsby site, along with the Mackenzie Building which is home to Linkage College, the charity's specialist further education college, and other buildings which support Linkage's care and Adult Skills day services.

== History ==
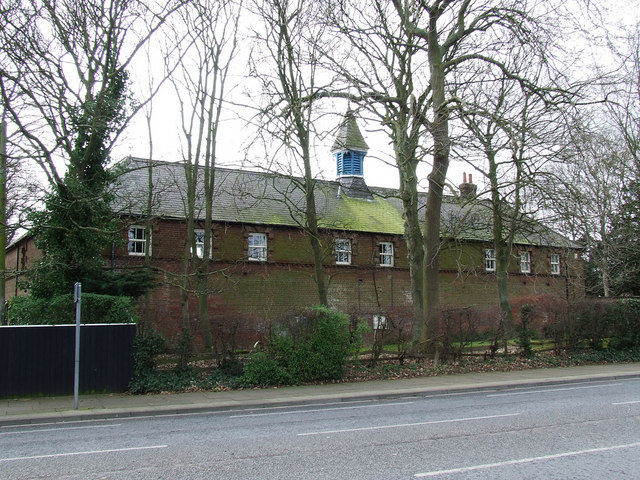
Rear view of 'Weelsby Park' in Weelsby Road.

By the time of the Norman Conquest there was already a settlement at Weelsby. Old Weelsby consisted of a manor house and a few scattered farmsteads and dwellings. To the east lay the village of Clee, with which Weelsby was closely associated. Both settlements were part of a wider Clee parish that also included Cleethorpes. To the west was the town of Grimsby.

By the late 19th century an increase in Grimsby's population resulted in a shortage of land for housing. From the 1870s there occurred an influx of people into the Holme Hill part of Weelsby, adjacent to the Grimsby boundary. East of the railway line (now Peaks Parkway) the Willingham Street, Hainton, Heneage and Convamore Road areas were subsequently developed. Later on the area west of the railway, as far as Peoples Park, was also built up.

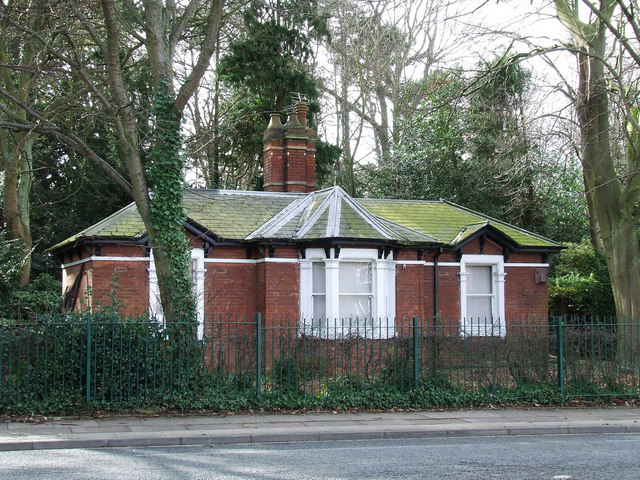
'Weelsby Hall' gatehouse in Weelsby Road.

In 1889 the northern parts of Weelsby and Clee were absorbed by Grimsby. This area was re-constituted as the civil parish of Clee within the borough of Grimsby (a status it retained until 1928). The area south of Weelsby Road and Clee Road, down to the Humberston boundary at Buck Beck and as far east as the cemetery and present-day Beacon Avenue/Trinity Road (which formed the boundary with Cleethorpes), remained outside the enlarged borough. This area was designated as a separate civil parish called Weelsby

Between 1922 and 1927 the Beacon Hill area was absorbed by Cleethorpes, while in 1928 a portion of Weelsby parish, including Weelsby Woods, Weelsby Avenue and Peaks Lane, became part of Grimsby. In 1968 Weelsby parish ceased to exist when the remaining part of Vaughan Avenue and nearby land was taken in by Grimsby, while the area around Hewitts Avenue and Buck Beck was divided between the parishes of Humberston and New Waltham.
