= Cleethorpes =

Seaside resort town in Lincolnshire, England

Coordinates: 53.5533°N 0.02155°W

- Town
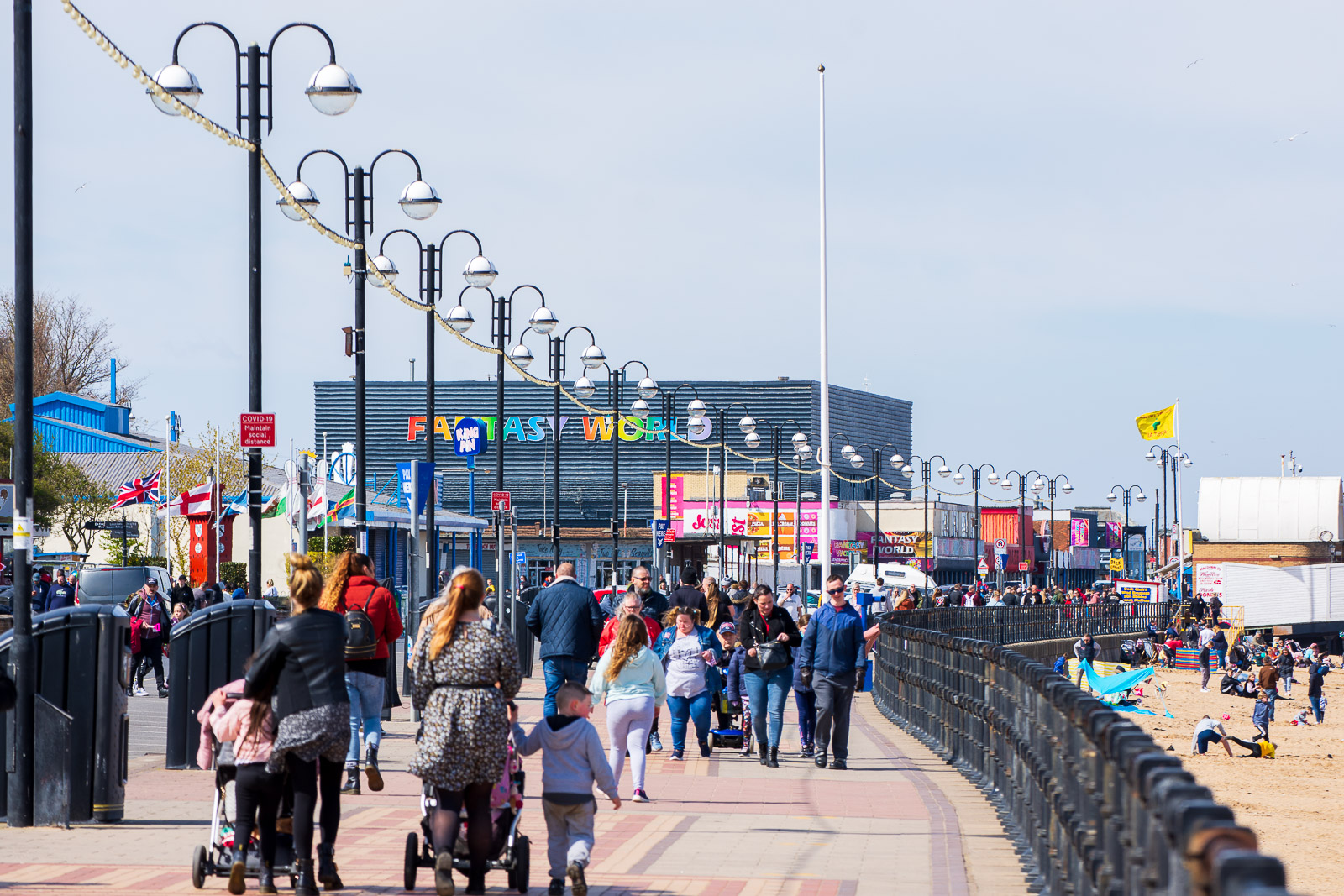
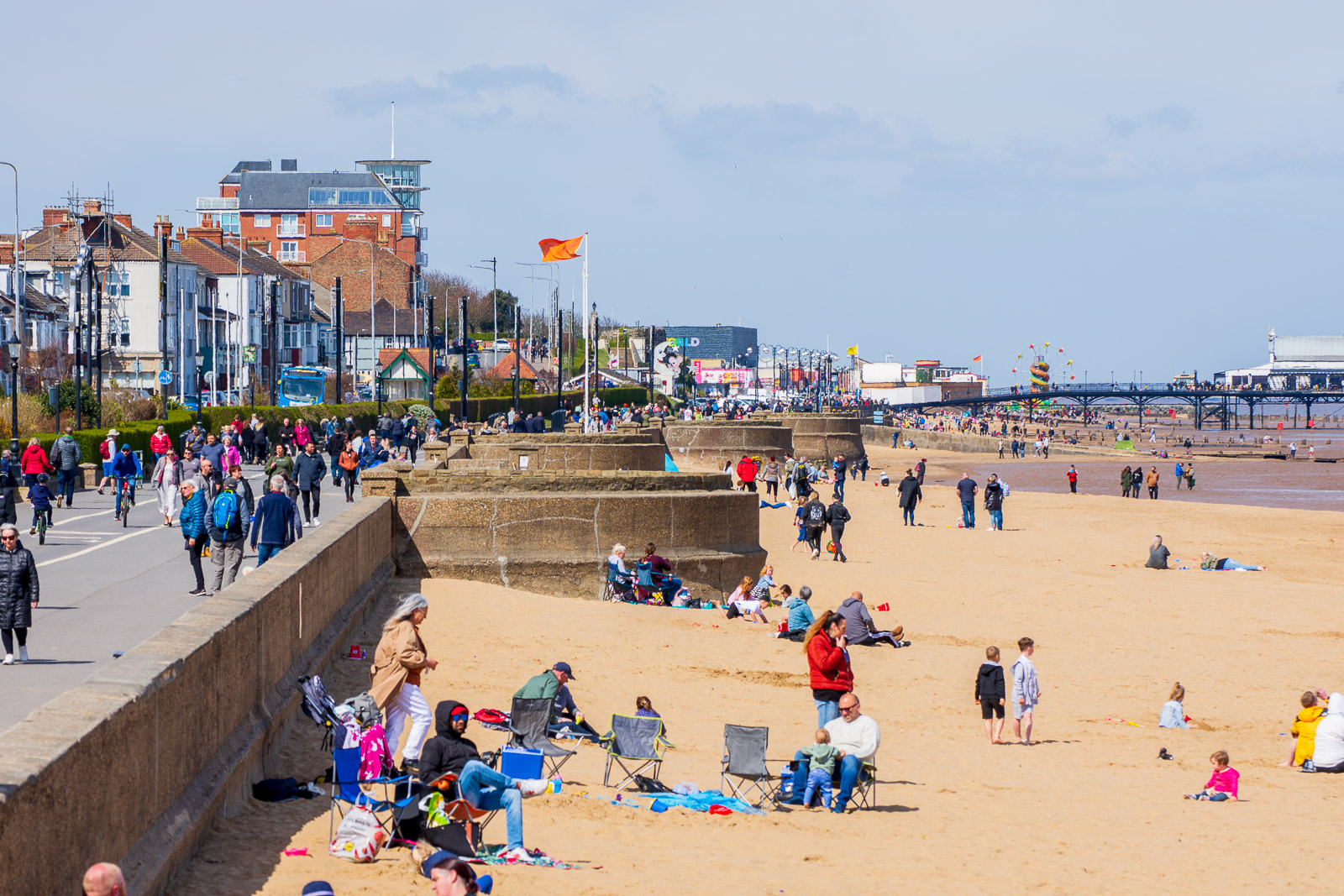
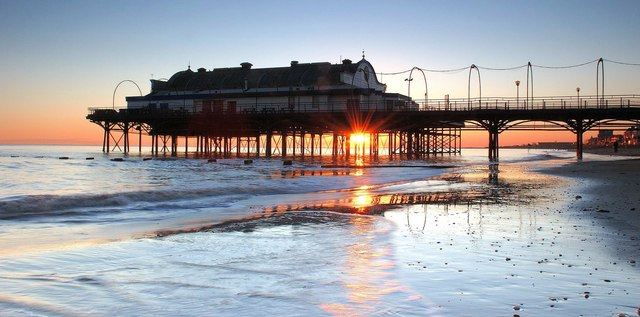
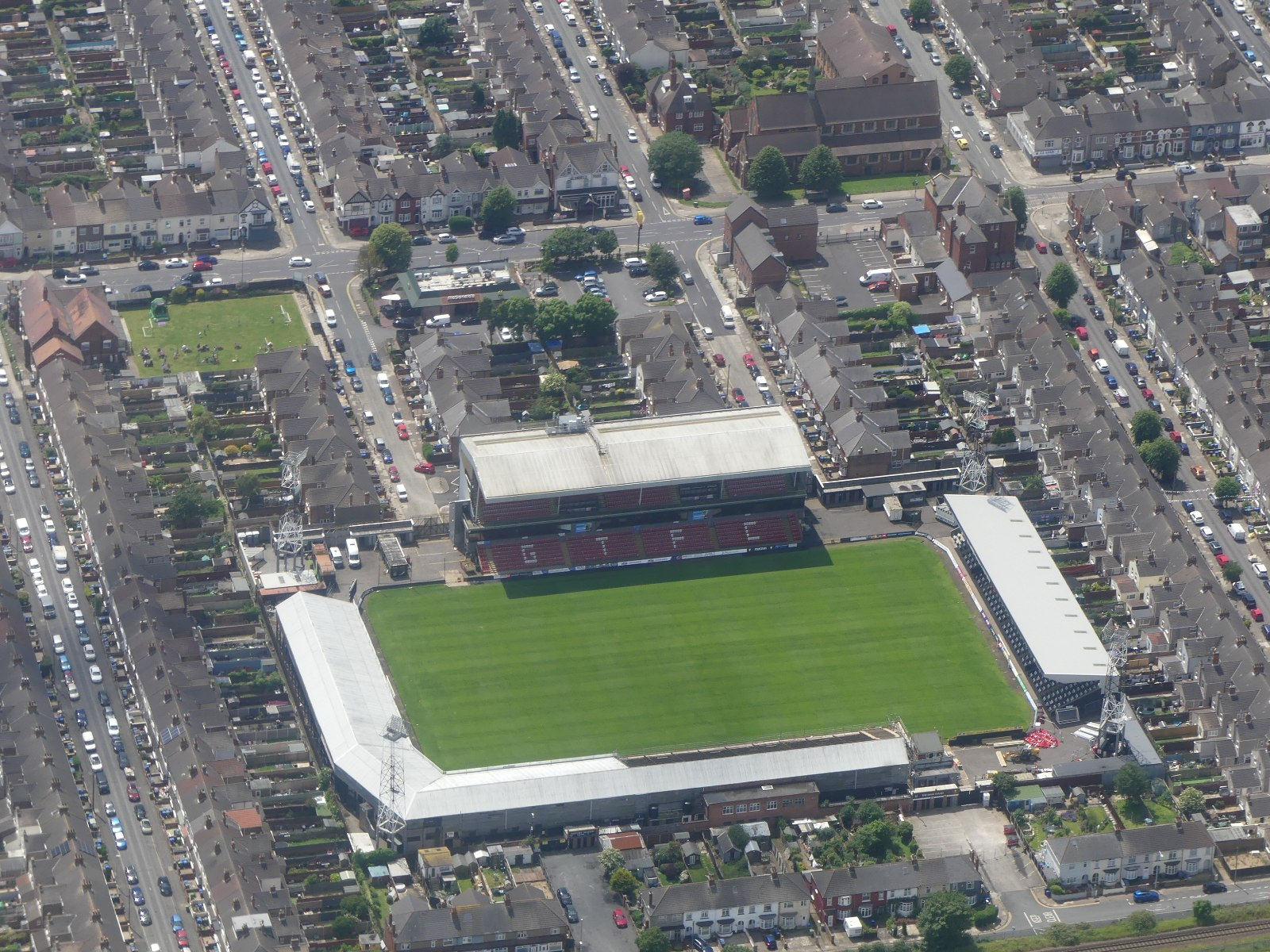
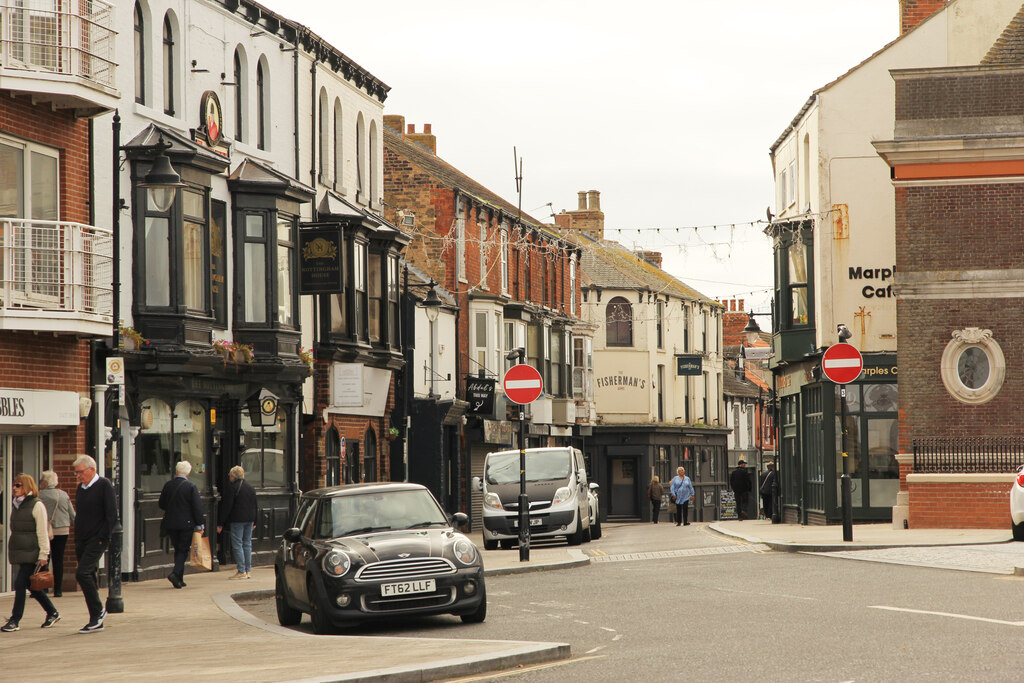
- The Promenade The Beach Cleethorpes Pier Blundell Park Seaview Street

- Location within Lincolnshire
- Population: 29,670 (2021 census)
- Language: English
- OS grid reference: TA310081
  - London: 140mi (230km) South
- Unitary authority: North East Lincolnshire
- Ceremonial county: Lincolnshire
- Region: Yorkshire and the Humber
- Country: England
- Sovereign state: United Kingdom
- Areas of the town: List: Humberston; New Clee; New Waltham; Old Clee; Thrunscoe; Weelsby Woods
- Post town: Cleethorpes
- Postcode district: DN35
- Dialling code: 01472
- Police: Humberside
- Fire: Humberside
- Ambulance: East Midlands
- UK Parliament: Great Grimsby and Cleethorpes
- Website: North East Lincolnshire Council

Cleethorpes (/ˈkliːθɔːrps/) is a seaside town on the estuary of the Humber in North East Lincolnshire, Lincolnshire, England with a population of 29,670 in 2021. It has been permanently occupied since the 6th century, with fishing as its original industry, and then developing into a resort in the 19th century. Before becoming a unified town, Cleethorpes was made up of the three small villages of Itterby, Oole and Thrunscoe.

The town lies on the prime meridian, also known as the Greenwich meridian, and its average annual rainfall is amongst the lowest in the British Isles.

In 2021, Trainline named Cleethorpes beach the second best seaside destination in the UK that is reachable by train, just behind Margate.

== History ==
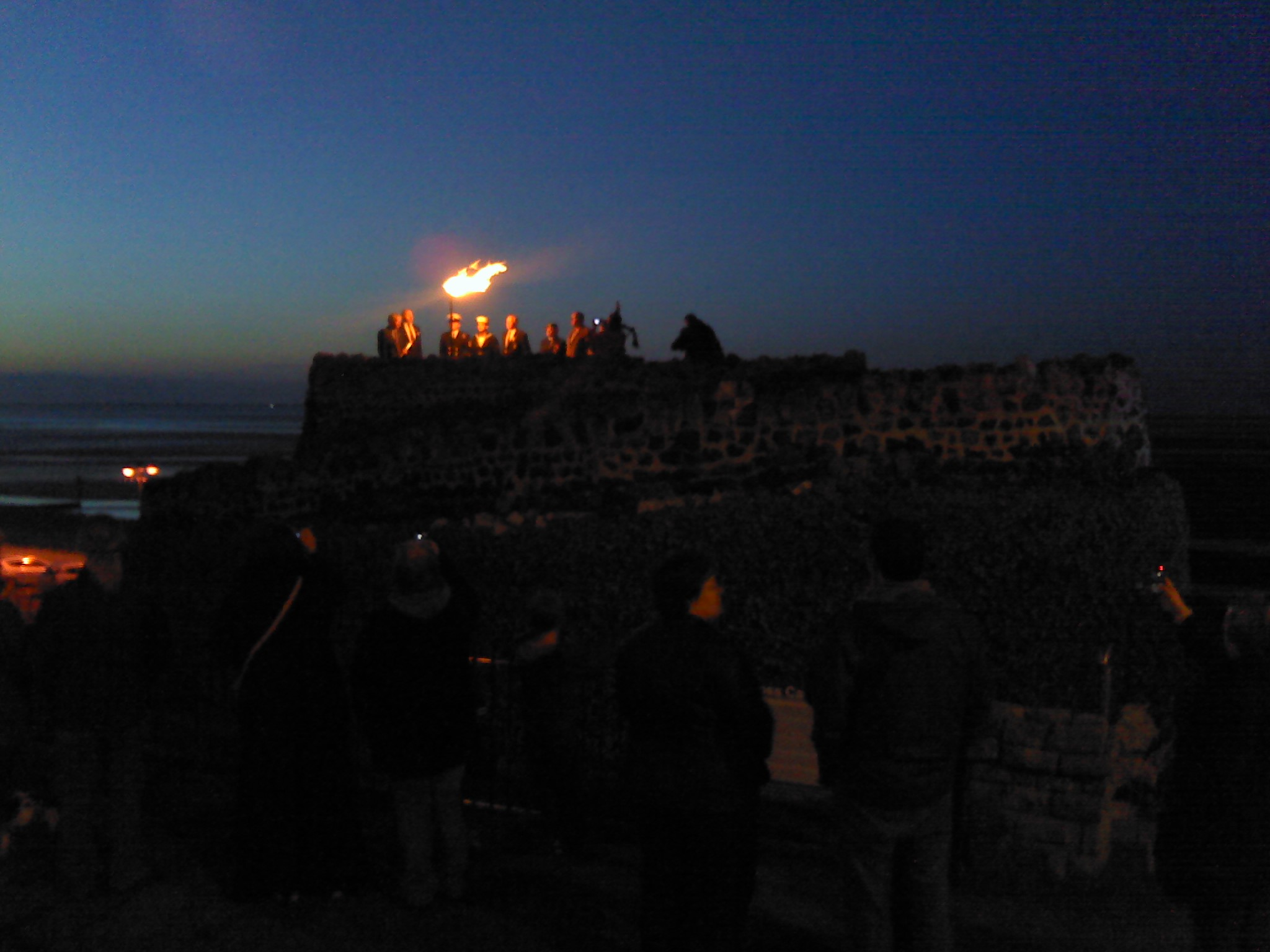
A beacon was lit on the top of Ross Castle to mark the Diamond Jubilee of Queen Elizabeth II on Monday 4 June 2012

Before becoming a unified town, Cleethorpes was made up of three small villages: Itterby, Oole and Thrunscoe, which were part of a wider parish called Clee (centred on Old Clee) named from clee, an old form of the word clay. The name Cleethorpes is of comparatively recent origin, combining the parish Clee with thorp, an Old English/Old Norse word for "village". The earliest attestations are 1552 for singular Clethorpe (meaning Itterby) and 1588 for plural Clethorpes (including Oole, adjacent to Itterby; later also Thrunscoe slightly to the south).

Whilst there are Neolithic and Bronze Age remains in the area, permanent occupation appears to date from the 6th century, with substantial communities appearing only in the 9th century when the Danes arrived.

The manor of Itterby was purchased in 1616 by the trustees of Peter Blundell's charity for the benefit of scholars and fellows at Sidney Sussex College, Cambridge from Blundell's School, Tiverton.

Cleethorpes developed as a fishing village. By the time of the 1801 census the population was 284. The 1820s saw the first developments of Cleethorpes as a health holiday resort, with sea-bathing and the taking of medicinal waters becoming fashionable. By 1831 the population had increased to 497.

Clee Inclosure Act 1842
- Act of Parliament
- Parliament of the United Kingdom
- Long title: An Act for inclosing Lands in the Parish of Clee in the County of Lincoln.
- Citation: 5 & 6 Vict. c. 1 Pr.

Dates
- Royal assent: 22 April 1842
Other legislation
Repealed by	Humberside Act 1982

Status: Repealed

Text of statute as originally enacted

In 1842 the Clee Inclosure Act 1842 (5 & 6 Vict. c. 1 Pr.) was enacted. 2,100 acres (8.5 km^{2}) of land were divided among land owners and eight new roads developed. In 1848 Cleethorpes was described as:

"...much resorted to as a bathing-place, for which it is highly eligible; the air is pure, the scenery good and besides a few lodging-houses and smaller inns, there is a large hotel, built some years since, on an eminence embracing extensive views of the sea, the Humber, and the Yorkshire coast. Many of the population are employed in the oyster-fisheries."

The resort expanded following the linking of the town by railway with industrial towns in Yorkshire. Cleethorpes Pier opened in 1873 and the promenade in 1885. Cleethorpes with Thrunscoe was created as a local board of health district in 1873, and under the Local Government Act 1894 it became an urban district. Its headquarters was established at Cleethorpes Town Hall in 1905.

In 1916 the urban district was renamed Cleethorpes, and in 1922 and 1927 the town's boundaries were extended to include part of Humberston (as far as North Sea Lane) and the Beacon Hill area of Weelsby parish. In 1936 Cleethorpes was granted a charter of incorporation to become a municipal borough.

Cleethorpes successfully resisted attempts by Grimsby to absorb it and in 1974 it became the Borough of Cleethorpes within the new county of Humberside. However, when Humberside County Council was abolished in 1996, Cleethorpes Borough Council was joined with Grimsby Borough Council as the unitary authority of North East Lincolnshire. In 2009, North East Lincolnshire Council agreed to market the towns of Grimsby, Immingham and Cleethorpes, under the 'Greater Grimsby' banner.

Local residents from Lincolnshire and the Yorkshire and Humber area affectionately refer to Cleethorpes and its residents as Meggies. Cleethorpes can also be known as "down beach".

== Geography ==
Cleethorpes is situated on the southern side of the Humber estuary in North East Lincolnshire – a unitary authority area in North of England. The Greenwich meridian passes through the town and a signpost shows some distances to world-wide locations. North Pole 2,517 miles (4,051 km), South Pole 9,919 miles (15,963 km), New York City 3,418 miles (5,501 km) and London 140 miles (230 km).

Cleethorpes is physically linked to the neighbouring town of Grimsby by built up residential estates and the villages of Old Clee and Weelsby are also contiguous with the two towns.

=== Climate ===
As with most of the British Isles, Cleethorpes experiences a maritime climate. It has mild summers and cool winters. The average annual rainfall is amongst the lowest in the British Isles.

Climate data for Cleethorpes, elevation: 0 m (0 ft), 1991–2020 normals, extremes 1959–2004
Month	Jan	Feb	Mar	Apr	May	Jun	Jul	Aug	Sep	Oct	Nov	Dec	Year
Record high °C (°F)	14.3 (57.7)	17.8 (64.0)	23.3 (73.9)	22.7 (72.9)	26.4 (79.5)	32.5 (90.5)	32.8 (91.0)	32.8 (91.0)	27.2 (81.0)	26.1 (79.0)	17.2 (63.0)	15.1 (59.2)	32.8 (91.0)
Mean daily maximum °C (°F)	7.7 (45.9)	8.5 (47.3)	10.5 (50.9)	13.1 (55.6)	15.9 (60.6)	18.6 (65.5)	21.1 (70.0)	21.1 (70.0)	18.6 (65.5)	14.7 (58.5)	10.6 (51.1)	8.1 (46.6)	14.1 (57.4)
Daily mean °C (°F)	4.8 (40.6)	5.3 (41.5)	6.9 (44.4)	9.2 (48.6)	11.7 (53.1)	14.5 (58.1)	17.0 (62.6)	17.0 (62.6)	14.6 (58.3)	11.4 (52.5)	7.7 (45.9)	5.1 (41.2)	10.4 (50.7)
Mean daily minimum °C (°F)	2.0 (35.6)	2.2 (36.0)	3.3 (37.9)	5.2 (41.4)	7.5 (45.5)	10.4 (50.7)	12.9 (55.2)	12.8 (55.0)	10.7 (51.3)	8.0 (46.4)	4.7 (40.5)	2.2 (36.0)	6.9 (44.4)
Record low °C (°F)	−10.5 (13.1)	−9.1 (15.6)	−7.2 (19.0)	−4.5 (23.9)	−0.6 (30.9)	1.0 (33.8)	5.2 (41.4)	5.6 (42.1)	3.0 (37.4)	−3.6 (25.5)	−4.7 (23.5)	−9.4 (15.1)	−10.5 (13.1)
Average precipitation mm (inches)	48.5 (1.91)	39.9 (1.57)	34.5 (1.36)	39.2 (1.54)	46.7 (1.84)	55.2 (2.17)	55.2 (2.17)	55.8 (2.20)	50.2 (1.98)	58.4 (2.30)	63.4 (2.50)	53.9 (2.12)	600.7 (23.65)
Average precipitation days (≥ 1.0 mm)	10.5	9.8	8.9	8.7	8.5	9.9	9.6	9.6	8.9	10.2	12.8	11.3	118.5
Mean monthly sunshine hours	60.4	85.1	121.1	160.3	209.8	190.1	205.9	187.8	142.2	105.5	66.8	56.8	1,591.8
Source: Met Office

== Economy ==
=== Regeneration ===
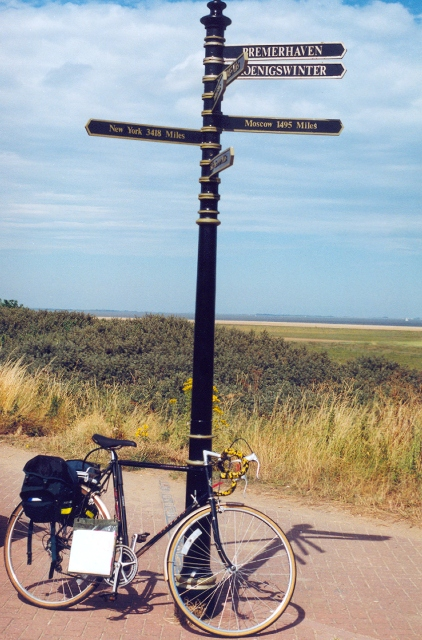
Greenwich meridian marker

The Winter Gardens, a venue for a variety of events, was demolished in 2007 and replaced by 47 flats. During a mass boycott of punk bands in the 1970s, the Winter Gardens was just one of five UK venues that allowed the likes of the Clash, AC/DC and the Sex Pistols to perform. The old mini steam railway running from the seafront leisure centre to St Anthony's bank has been extended. A cafe, taphouse, and gallery have been added to the boating lake, and many ducks and geese use the boating lake to breed. A large open air show ground has been built close to the eastern end of the boating lake — it often shows live bands and hosts special events, most notably hosting the London 2012 Olympic torch relay.

A new RNLI station is set to be completed on the Central Promenade by 2025.

== Transport ==
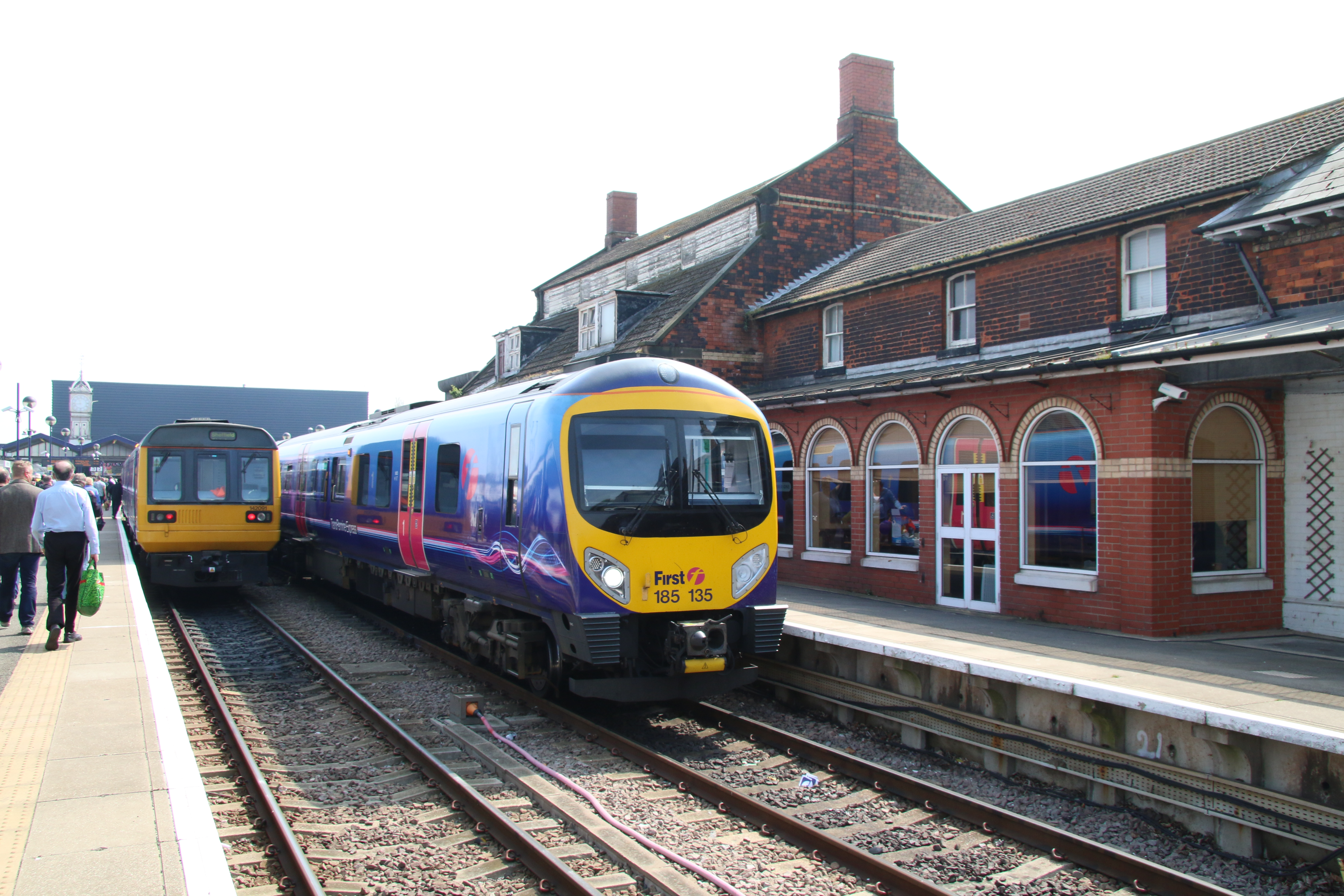
Trains at Cleethorpes station

Cleethorpes railway station is served by three train operating companies:

- TransPennine Express operate hourly trains to Doncaster, Sheffield, Manchester Piccadilly and Liverpool Lime Street; they also manage the station;
- East Midlands Railway run two-hourly trains to Barton upon Humber, via Grimsby Town for a bus link to Hull. They also operate two-hourly trains to Matlock via Lincoln and Nottingham. On Sundays, there are three trains per day to Matlock all year and four to Barton-on-Humber during the summer months only.
- Northern Trains operates a limited service of one train per day to Sheffield via Brigg which operates on Mondays to Fridays only.

Trains to London King's Cross, Peterborough, Leeds, Bradford Interchange, York, Newcastle and Edinburgh are available by travelling to Doncaster and changing there. Connections to Leicester are available by changing at Nottingham, for services run by East Midlands Railway.

Bus services to Grimsby, Immingham and nearby villages are operated by Stagecoach East Midlands. There is a bus service to Skegness, via Louth, which runs once a day on weekends in the summer.

The Cleethorpes area is served by the following roads:

- A16 between Grimsby and Peterborough;
- A46 to Bath;
- A180 to Barnetby-le-Wold.

== Education ==
Secondary schools in Cleethorpes include Cleethorpes Academy and Beacon Academy.

From September 2011, N.E. Lincolnshire SSP was the only remaining School Sports Partnership after government funding cuts.

== Religion ==
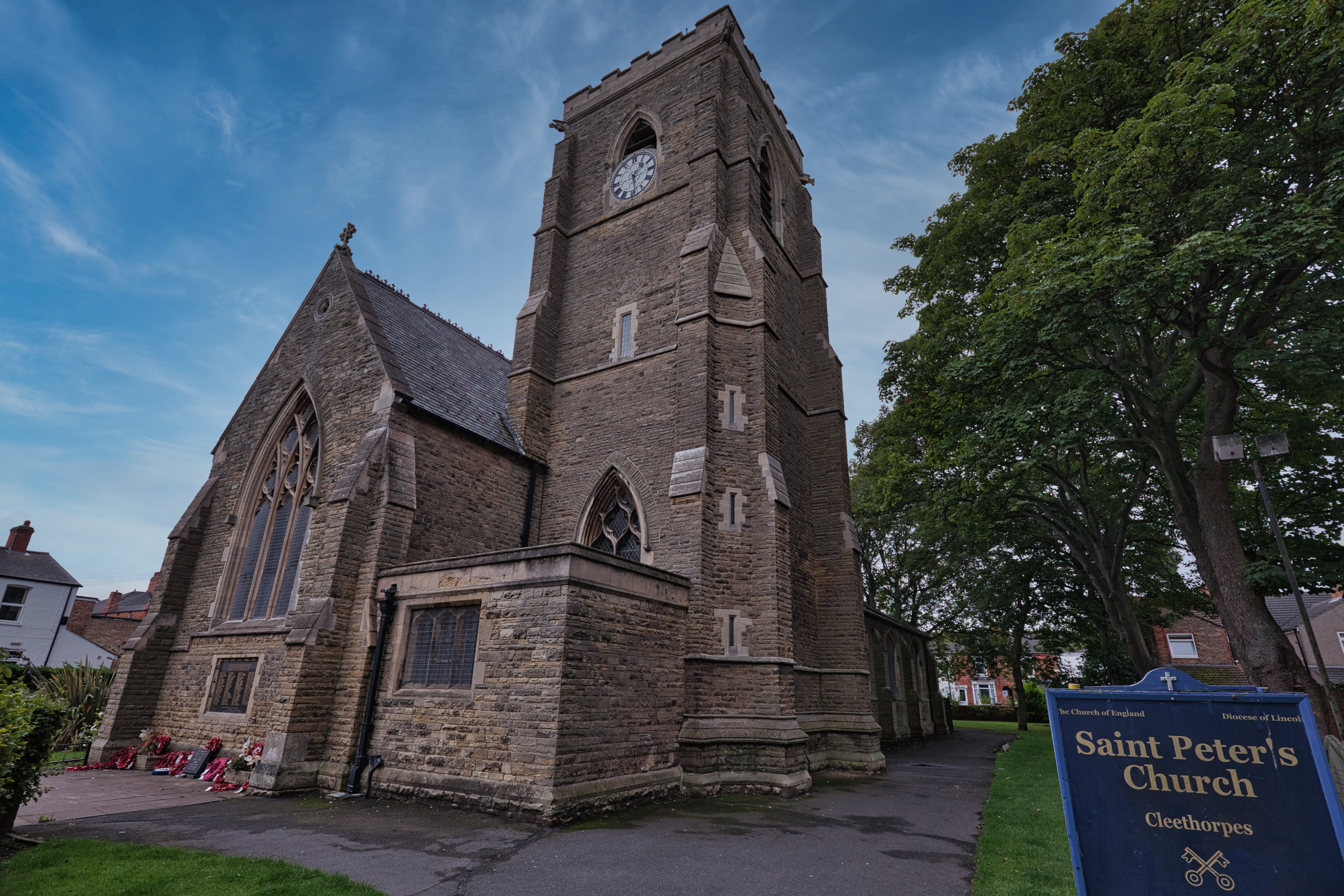
St Peter's Church

The parish church is St Peter's, built in 1866. Holy Trinity and St Mary the Virgin Church in Old Clee is the oldest building (built 950 AD) in the Grimsby area. Other Anglican churches are St Francis of Assisi on Sandringham Road, and Christ Church on Grimsby Road. There is a Roman Catholic church, Corpus Christi, also on Grimsby Road, a Baptist church and a Methodist church.

== Sport and leisure ==
Cleethorpes is home to Blundell Park, the home ground of Grimsby Town; they are one of few English League clubs with a town or city name to have their home ground in a different community. Cleethorpes Town F.C. play in the Northern Premier League – South East Division; their home matches, conversely, are played at the Linden Homes Club, in Clee Road, Grimsby.

There is an athletics club and Cleethorpes Rugby Union Football Club who play in the Midlands 4 East (NE).

Cleethorpes cricket ground, known as Cleethorpes Sports Ground, is located on Chichester Road. It hosts professional games such as the 20/20 cup and various county games played by Lincolnshire County Cricket Club, and the Vagabonds cricket team.

The old Cleethorpes bathing pool was demolished and replaced in the eighties with a modern leisure centre. Facilities include a large indoor wave pool, badminton and squash courts, a gym and sports hall. The local badminton club meets here.

A greyhound racing track was opened around the outside of the stock car racing track in 1981, which was on the site of the former Cleethorpes Marineland & Zoo which closed in 1977. The racing was independent (not affiliated to the sports governing body the National Greyhound Racing Club NGRC) and was known as a flapping track, which was the nickname given to independent tracks. In 1983, there were plans to build new kennels and join the NGRC but racing only lasted until midway through 1986. The stock cars closed in the mid-1990s.

== Governance ==
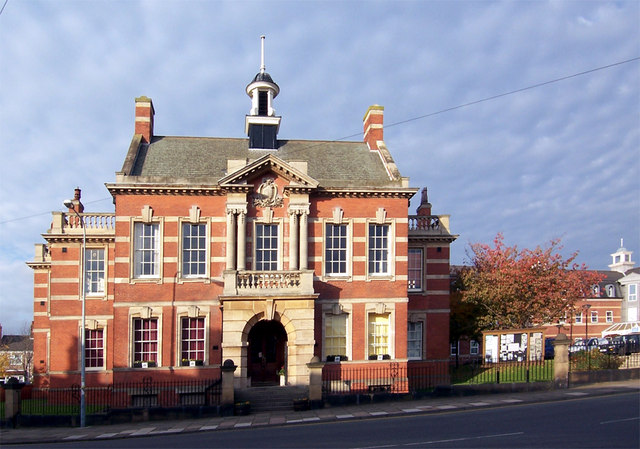
Cleethorpes Town Hall

Cleethorpes is currently part of Great Grimsby and Cleethorpes, which also includes other towns in the area, including Immingham and Barton-upon-Humber. Prior to 1997, Cleethorpes had been included in the constituencies of Brigg and Cleethorpes, Louth (Lincolnshire) and Grimsby.

Since 1945, the members of parliament for Cleethorpes have been as follows:

Election	Member	Party
1945	Kenneth Younger	Labour
1950	Sir Cyril Osborne	Conservative
1969	Jeffrey Archer	Conservative
1974	Michael Brotherton	Conservative
1983	Michael Brown	Conservative
1997	Shona McIsaac	Labour
2010	Martin Vickers	Conservative
2024	Melanie Onn	Labour

Since 1996 Cleethorpes has formed an unparished area in the unitary borough of North East Lincolnshire. Cleethorpes comprises three of the borough's sixteen wards: Croft Baker, Haverstoe and Sidney Sussex. Each ward returns three councillors, so Cleethorpes is represented by 9 of 42 members of the council. Cleethorpes does not have its own town council; however, the nine councillors form the charter trustees of the Town of Cleethorpes.

=== Council wards and elected members ===
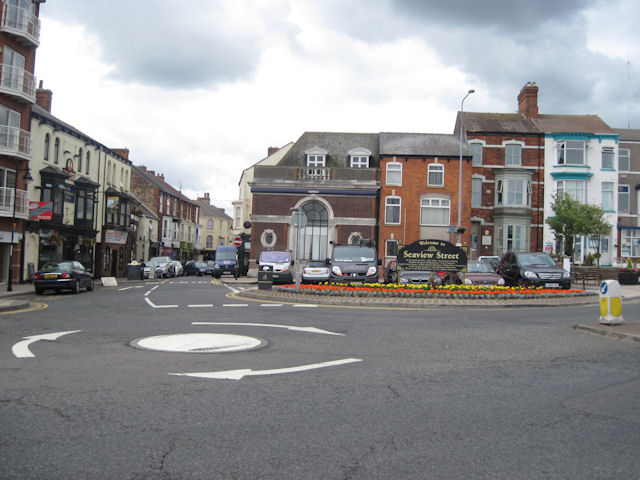
Town Centre

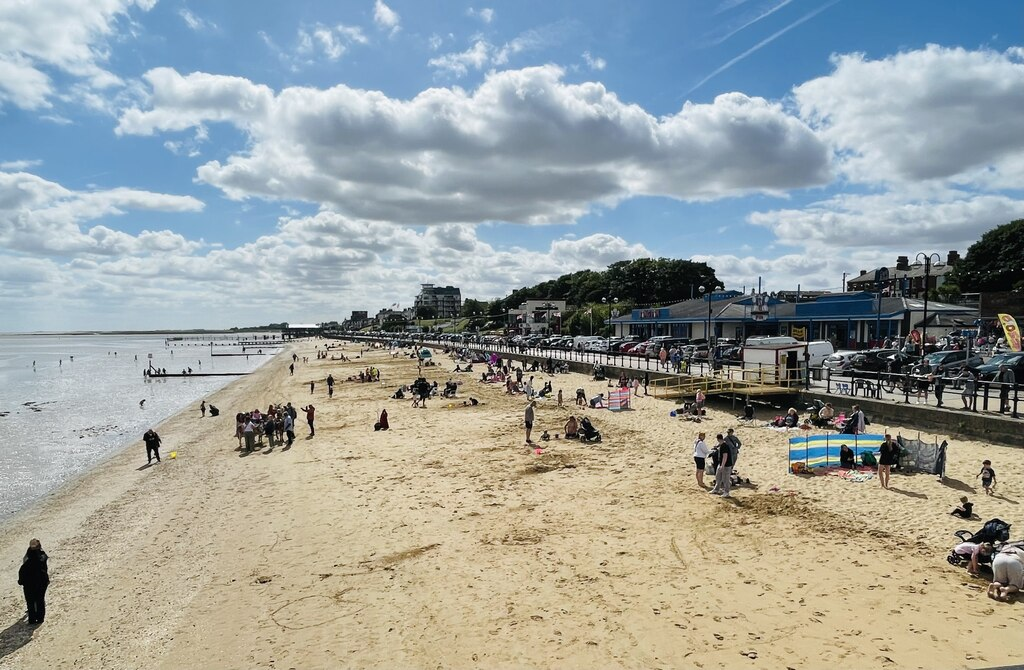
Cleethorpes Beach

North East Lincolnshire Council has three council wards within the area of Cleethorpes. As of 3 May 2025, the councillors are:

Croft Baker ward:

- Oliver Freeston (R)
- Marian Jervis (L)
- Malcolm Morland (L)

Sidney Sussex ward:

- Edward Kaczmarek (L)
- Sophia Farren (L)
- Janet Haggis (L)

Haverstoe ward:

- Bill Parkinson (C)
- Margaret Cracknell (C)
- Keith Brookes (C)

Key: (L) = Labour Party (C) = Conservative Party (R)= Reform UK

== Media ==
Local news and television programmes are provided by BBC Yorkshire and Lincolnshire and ITV Yorkshire. Television signals are received from the Belmont TV transmitter.

The town's local radio stations are BBC Radio Humberside on 95.9 FM, Hits Radio East Yorkshire & North Lincolnshire (formerly Viking FM) on 96.9 FM, Hits Radio Lincolnshire (formerly Lincs FM) and Greatest Hits Radio Yorkshire (formerly Compass FM) on 96.4 FM.

Local newspapers are Grimsby Telegraph and Grimsby & Cleethorpes Advertiser.

== Places of interest and landmarks ==
The seaside resort of Cleethorpes lies on the Humber Estuary; thus the sea at Cleethorpes is the mouth of the Humber. There are several hundred metres of sand at low tide.

The sea front provides views of shipping traffic entering and leaving the Humber for the ports of Grimsby, Immingham, Hull and Goole.

Two large fortifications, the Humber Forts, are visible in the mouth of the river. On a clear day, the lighthouse situated on Spurn Point can be seen with the naked eye from the North Beach.

There is a Royal National Lifeboat Institution station near the pier and next to the Coastguard on Central Promenade. Work began on a new, larger RNLI station in 2022. Cleethorpes Rescue also protect the beach.

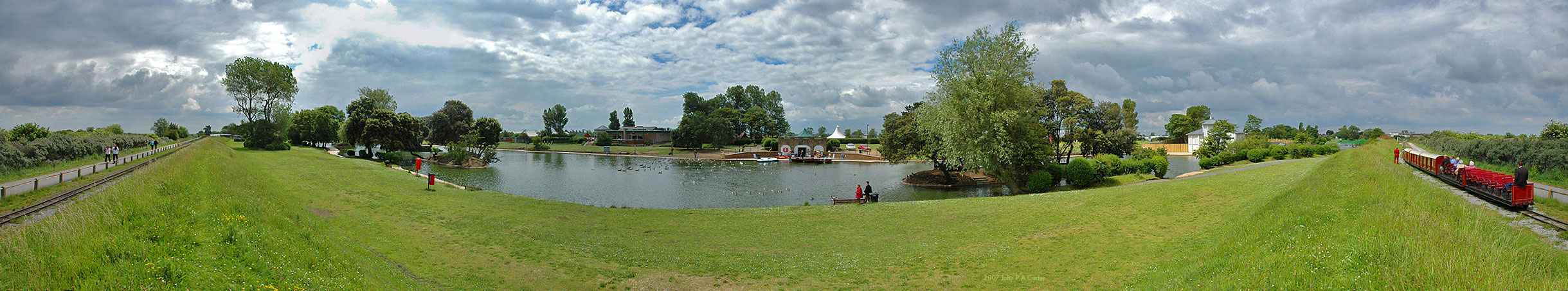
The boating lake

Cleethorpes has a large boating lake with many varieties of ducks, swans and geese. There is also a 62.01-hectare (153.2-acre) local nature reserve: Cleethorpes Country Park, situated between the resort and the village of Humberston. To the south of Cleethorpes, near Humberston, is a yacht club.

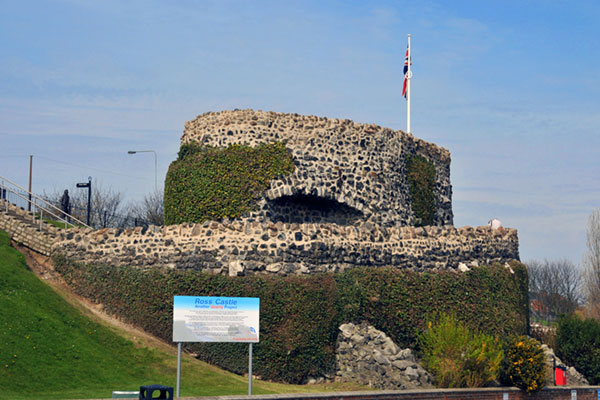
Ross Castle

The Cleethorpes Leisure Centre was opened in 1983 to replace the open bathing pool that was wrecked by storms on 11 January 1978. The leisure centre contains a 33-metre pool, 1.8 metres deep, as well as a water slide and a wave machine. The building also contains a gym and a sports hall. In 2012, major work was carried out to the roof of the building due to water damage.

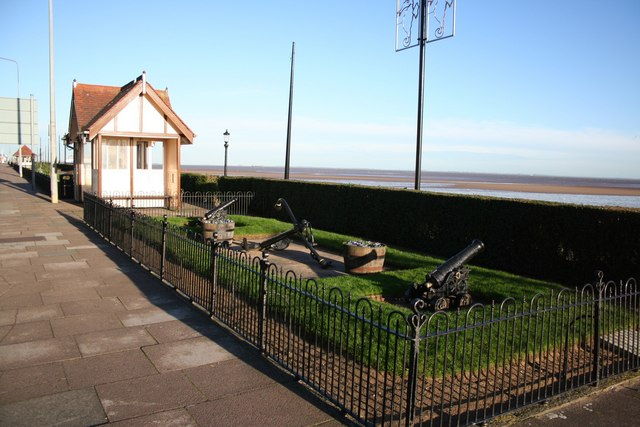
Kingsway gardens and seafront

Ross Castle, a mock ruin of a castle built in 1885 by the Manchester, Sheffield and Lincolnshire Railway, was named after Edward Ross, secretary of the railway company. Its height was the highest point on the cliffs. After a period of closure, the castle was renovated, re-opening in June 2008 to the public. Possibilities of a further closure have been raised after a woman fell to her death on 9 January 2009.

In 2007 the town was the Royal Horticultural Society's Britain in Bloom award winner in the coastal category. The town was also received a Silver-Gilt award, a tourism award (for Lollipop Road Train) and Jeff Blanchard the Shredded Wheat Community Champions award.

A statue of the Boy with the Leaking Boot was given to the town in 1918 by John Carlborn. It is reported that he was a Swedish immigrant to Cleethorpes who had built up a successful shipping business, and that the statue was a copy of one in the Hasselbacken Restaurant in Stockholm, Sweden. The Cleethorpes statue now stands in a pond in the Diana Princess of Wales Memorial Gardens, on Kingsway. It was stolen and replaced in 2002 and 2008, and vandalised in October 2011. In July 2012, two youths were recorded on CCTV as they frolicked naked in the pond and destroyed the fountain. A replacement statue was made by a local garden ornaments manufacturer and installed with improved security in September 2012. A nearby pub was named The Leaking Boot, but was destroyed by fire in June 2009.

In 2019, a community alleyway on Kew Road was vandalized. The alley is known for hosting Cleethorpes In Bloom competition, and was a recipient of many awards over the past few years.

The town is home to Cleethorpes Beach Holiday Park, currently run by Haven Holidays. Due to its former name, Thorpe Park Holiday Centre, bearing a strong resemblance to the Thorpe Park Resort theme park in Thorpe, Surrey, there was a glitch on Google Maps that mistook the two, accidentally sending people going to the theme park to the Haven and vice versa. This, alongside confusion between the two, and possible private legal action from Merlin Entertainments, the current owners of Thorpe Park, influenced Haven to rebrand the park.

=== Other visitor attractions ===
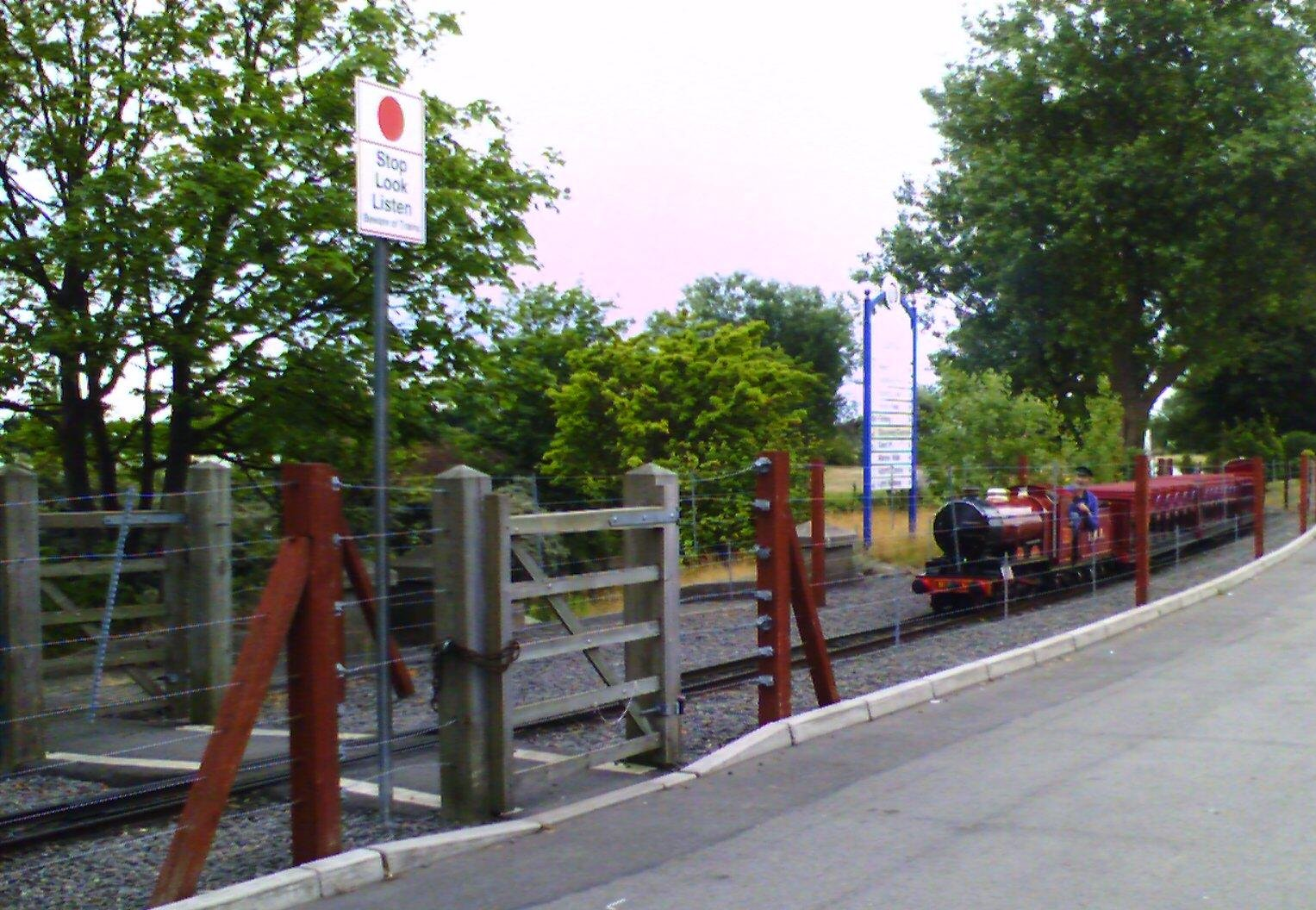
Cleethorpes Coast Light Railway

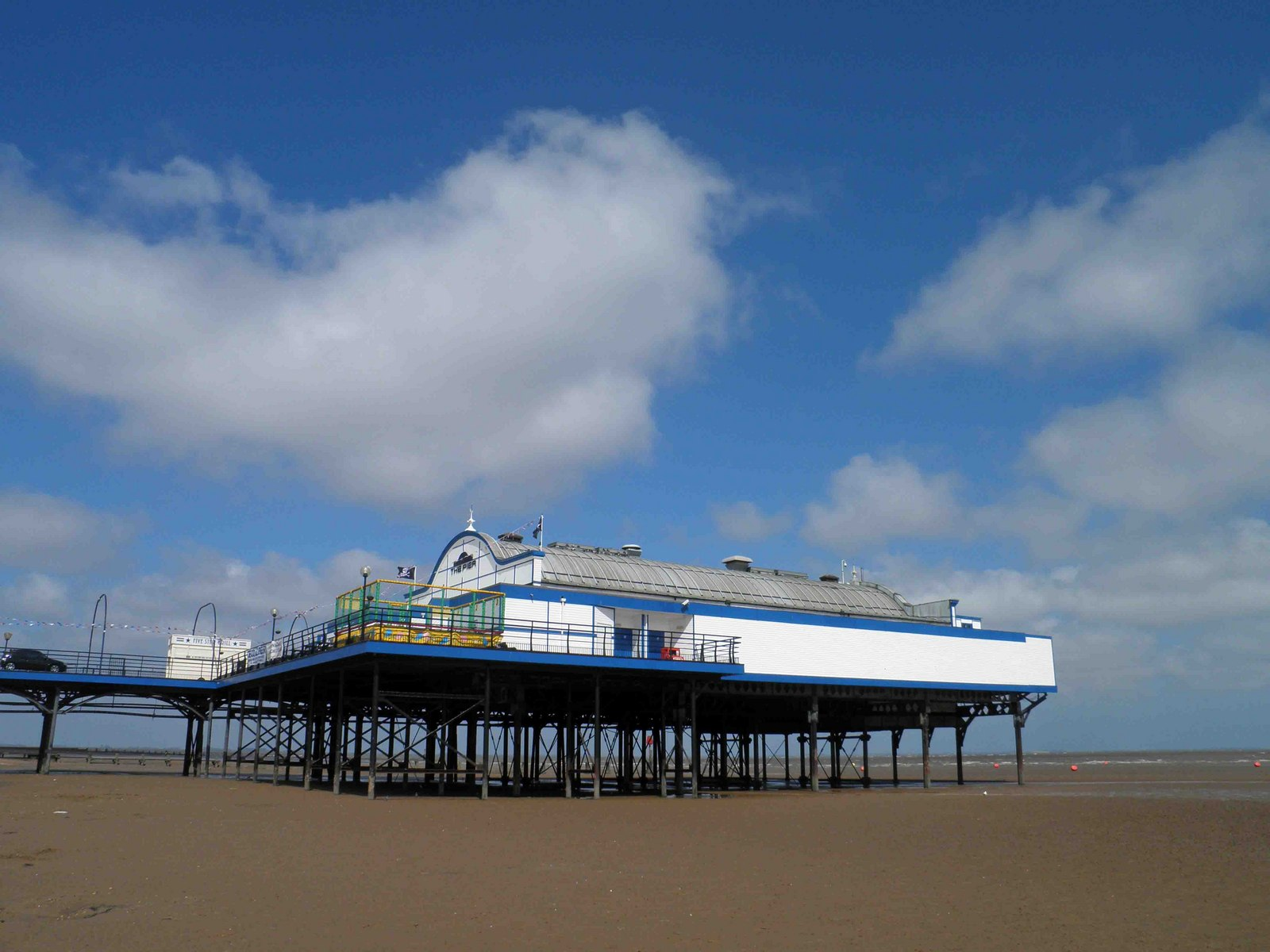
Cleethorpes Pier

- Cleethorpes Coast Light Railway
- Cleethorpes Pier
- Discovery Centre
- Floyd the Dragon - The Cleethorpes mascot
- Meridian Point
- Pleasure Island Family Theme Park (closed in October 2016)

There was a roll of honour at Matthew Humberston Foundation School commemorating the deaths of 42 past pupils of the school who died in World War I, but after the closure of the school in 2010, it was put into storage at the North East Lincolnshire Council offices. As of November 2019 the roll of honour was still being stored by the council, "with a view to being put on public display in a new town centre museum and heritage centre".

== UFO sighting ==
On 22 September 1956 at 3pm a UFO was spotted for more than an hour off the Cleethorpes coast; it was seen by radar at RAF Manby too. It was a large spherical object with a glass appearance. The Lakenheath-Bentwaters incident had happened the month before.

== Notable people ==
- Freddie Frinton Freddie Frinton actor from Dinner for one
- Kristian Adams (b. 1976), cricketer, played for Kent and Lincolnshire, born in Cleethorpes
- Jane Andrews, English former Royal dresser and convicted murderer of Tom Cressman
- Bill Appleyard (1879–1958), footballer for Newcastle United, born in Cleethorpes
- Phil Ball, writer, brought up in Cleethorpes
- H. Hugh Bancroft, organist and composer
- Stephen Bennett, golfer
- John Cockerill, footballer
- Peter Collinson, film producer and director
- Bob Cottam, cricketer
- Eorl Crabtree, rugby league footballer
- Michele Dotrice, actress
- Helen Fospero, television newsreader and journalist
- Vivean Gray, actress
- Alan Green, local politician
- Amanda Hack, politician
- Chris Hargreaves, ex-footballer and ex-manager of Torquay United
- Patricia Hodge, actress
- Linda Ingham, artist
- Jo Kendall, actress
- John Maltby, potter and sculptor
- Gemma Merna, actress
- Don Oslear, cricket umpire
- Michael Parsons, singer, songwriter and earlier member of the boyband District3
- Helen Roberts, singer and actress
- Paul Roberts, cricketer
- Carl Ross, fishery entrepreneur
- Rod Temperton, songwriter, record producer and musician
- Bridget Turner, actress
- Martin John Vickers (b. 1950 Cleethorpes), British politician, local MP
- Lambert Williamson, British film composer, born at 14 Lindum Road
- Richard Witts, musicologist and ex-leader of 1980s group the Passage
- John Derek Woollins, chemist
- Darren Wrack, footballer
- Patrick Wymark, actor

== International relations ==
Cleethorpes is twinned with Königswinter in Germany.

== See also ==
- Compass FM
- Humber Coast & City Railway
- Orpheus Male Voice Choir, Grimsby & Cleethorpes
- Trolleybuses in Cleethorpes
- Yellowbelly (Lincolnshire)
