= Orpheus Male Voice Choir, Grimsby & Cleethorpes =

The Orpheus Male Voice Choir was formed in 1949 by a small group of enthusiastic singers from the Grimsby and Cleethorpes area under the musical direction of Vera Burton. Early successes in festivals and concerts soon led to an increase in membership.

The choir continued to grow under the direction of George Cave and then Arthur Robinson. Since 1981 the choir had been under the musical direction of Richard Bradley with Audrey Ellis as the accompanist. Latterly, Trevor Jones and Lynn Robinson are Musical Director and Accompanist respectively. The Orpheus meet each week at the Central Hall, Grimsby.

== Reputation ==
The reputation of the choir has grown over recent years with many competition successes, broadcasts, recordings and concerts that have been given throughout England, Wales, Germany, the Netherlands, France and Sweden.

== Past Concerts ==
In recent years the choir has performed in concerts with well-known artists such as Richard Markham and David Nettle, Keith Swallow, Angela Brownridge, Linda Strachan, The Fairer Sax, John Briggs, Charles Daniels, Jonathan Plowright, Maryetta Midgley, Celticana, Bones Apart and Frances Brookes.

Concerts with other well-known choirs and bands have proved to be very popular and guest performers have included the British Steel Band, The Best of British Jazz, Yorkshire Building Society Band, London Welsh Male Voice Choir, Morriston Male Voice Choir, The Leo Solomon Trio and Male Voice Choirs from the Netherlands, Germany and Sweden.

== Activities ==
The Choir perform in many varied venues and willingly support charitable occasions. They also regularly promote their own concerts at major venues and play host to a variety of well-known performers as well as encouraging young people who are at the beginning of their professional careers.
