= Old Clee =

Area of Grimsby, Lincolnshire, England

Coordinates: 53.556578°N 0.048308°W

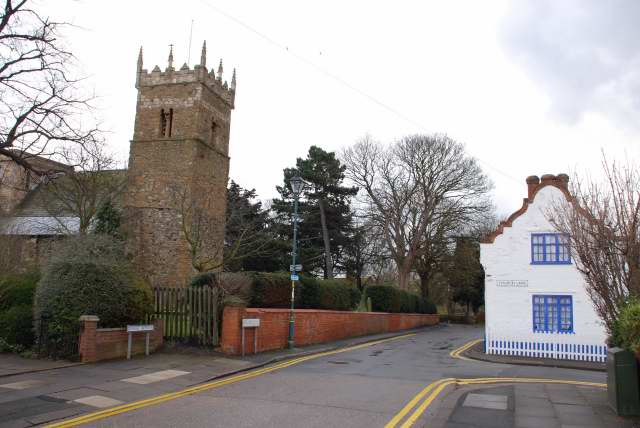
- Church Lane, Old Clee

- Location within Lincolnshire
- OS grid reference: TA293084
  - London: 140 mi (230 km) S
- Unitary authority: North East Lincolnshire
- Ceremonial county: Lincolnshire
- Region: Yorkshire and the Humber
- Country: England
- Sovereign state: United Kingdom
- Post town: Grimsby
- Postcode district: DN32
- Police: Humberside
- Fire: Humberside
- Ambulance: East Midlands
- UK Parliament: Great Grimsby and Cleethorpes

Old Clee is located in the Clee Road (A46) and Carr Lane area of eastern Grimsby, North East Lincolnshire, England, and adjoins the neighbouring town of Cleethorpes, to which it has historic links. It is in the Heneage ward of the North East Lincolnshire Unitary Council. Previously a separate village, its parish church of Holy Trinity and Saint Mary, claimed to be the oldest building in Grimsby, has an Anglo-Saxon tower dating from 1050. Located in the area are the Old Clee infants and junior schools (Colin Avenue) and the Havelock Academy (Holyoake Road). Nearby is the King George V Stadium.

== History ==
The settlement of Clee was in existence by the time of the Norman Conquest and is mentioned in the Domesday Book, as a village of over twenty households, held by brothers Erik and Tosti in 1066, and by Odo, half-brother of William the Conqueror, following the conquest. Its Domesday Book name was Cleia, from the Old English for clay, in reference to the area's soil.

Clee was one of six villages, or thorpes, within a wider ancient parish, also called Clee. Of the six villages, only Old Clee, as it is now known, and, to the west, Weelsby, remain. The north-western village of Holme, or South Holm, is now part of Grimsby, while the eastern villages of Hole or Oole, Itterby and Thrunscoe joined to form the town of Cleethorpes. The southern boundary with Humberston was at Buck Beck.

A long-standing dispute with Grimsby over the position of the boundary stone near what is now Bath Street was legally settled in favour of Clee in 1830. Until the mid-19th century, Clee parish operated the open field system of agriculture. Under the Enclosure award of 1846 land in Clee village and Cleethorpes was divided between various landowners, mainly G.F. Heneage, Richard Thorold and Sidney Sussex College.

As trade in the Grimsby commercial and fishing docks expanded, its population grew, which led to a shortage of land for housing within Grimsby. From the 1860s there was a movement of people across the town's eastern boundary into the almost uninhabited northern part of Clee (called New Clee) near Grimsby docks. This area lay between Humber Street and Park Street, which formed the boundary with the Cleethorpes section of the parish.

By the 1880s the population of New Clee had reached over 9,000, nearly all dependent on the fishing trades. From this built-up area, about a mile to the south-east lay the sparsely populated rural area of Old Clee, with its medieval church, farms, cottages and grammar school.

The western boundary of Clee parish with Grimsby ran along the eastern side of what is now Scartho Road cemetery, crossed Weelsby Road wound through the Peoples Park, then veered north-east into Welholme Road. From there it continued north along the length of and included Willingham Street, also taking in part of Pasture Street and Bradley Street to Hainton Square.

From Hainton Square the boundary then crossed Wellington Street to the junction with Albion Street. Albion Street was on the Grimsby side of the boundary whereas neighbouring Charles Street (later renamed Hope Street) was in Clee. Moving north the line continued to Bath Street, Cleethorpe Road, ending at Humber Street near Grimsby docks.

In 1889 New Clee, Old Clee and the northern part of Weelsby were absorbed by Grimsby under the Grimsby Extension and Improvement Act 1889 (52 & 53 Vict. c. xxxiv). In 1894 this area was re-constituted as the civil parish of Clee within the borough of Grimsby a status it retained until 1928. During the following years the open space between New Clee and Old Clee village disappeared as housing developments spread into the Grant Thorold and Carr Lane areas. Also in 1894 the area south of Weelsby Road and Clee Road became the separate parish of Weelsby which remained outside the enlarged borough. Cleethorpes became an urban district.

=== Church history ===
An early church existed in Old Clee prior to the Norman Conquest which was under the supervision of the Austin canons of Wellow Abbey.

The present church is Grade I English Heritage listed. Its Saxon tower dates to 1050, while a Latin inscription records the dedication of the church, to 'Saint Trinity and St. Mary the Virgin', by Hugh, Bishop of Lincoln, in 1192. The church was intended to provide not only a place of worship, but also a vantage point from which to watch for Viking invaders and a sanctuary to protect the villagers. During the building of the tower, an image of a face was added to one side.

=== Clee Hall ===
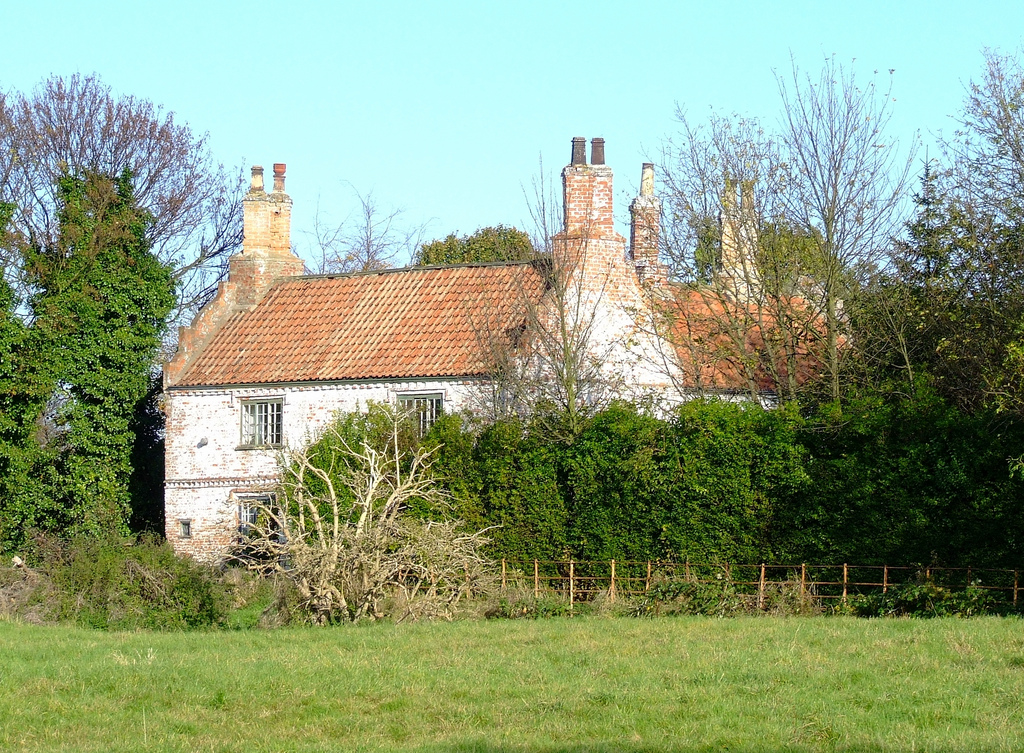
Elizabethan Clee Hall. In the late 1800s it still had a thatched roof.

Clee Hall, formerly known as Mordaunt Hall, for the family of that name which lived there, is two storey farmhouse, which dates to the Elizabethan era, with some late 19th to early 20th century additions. The house and garden are surrounded by the remains of a Medieval moat.
