= Weelsby Woods =

Park in Grimsby, Lincolnshire, England

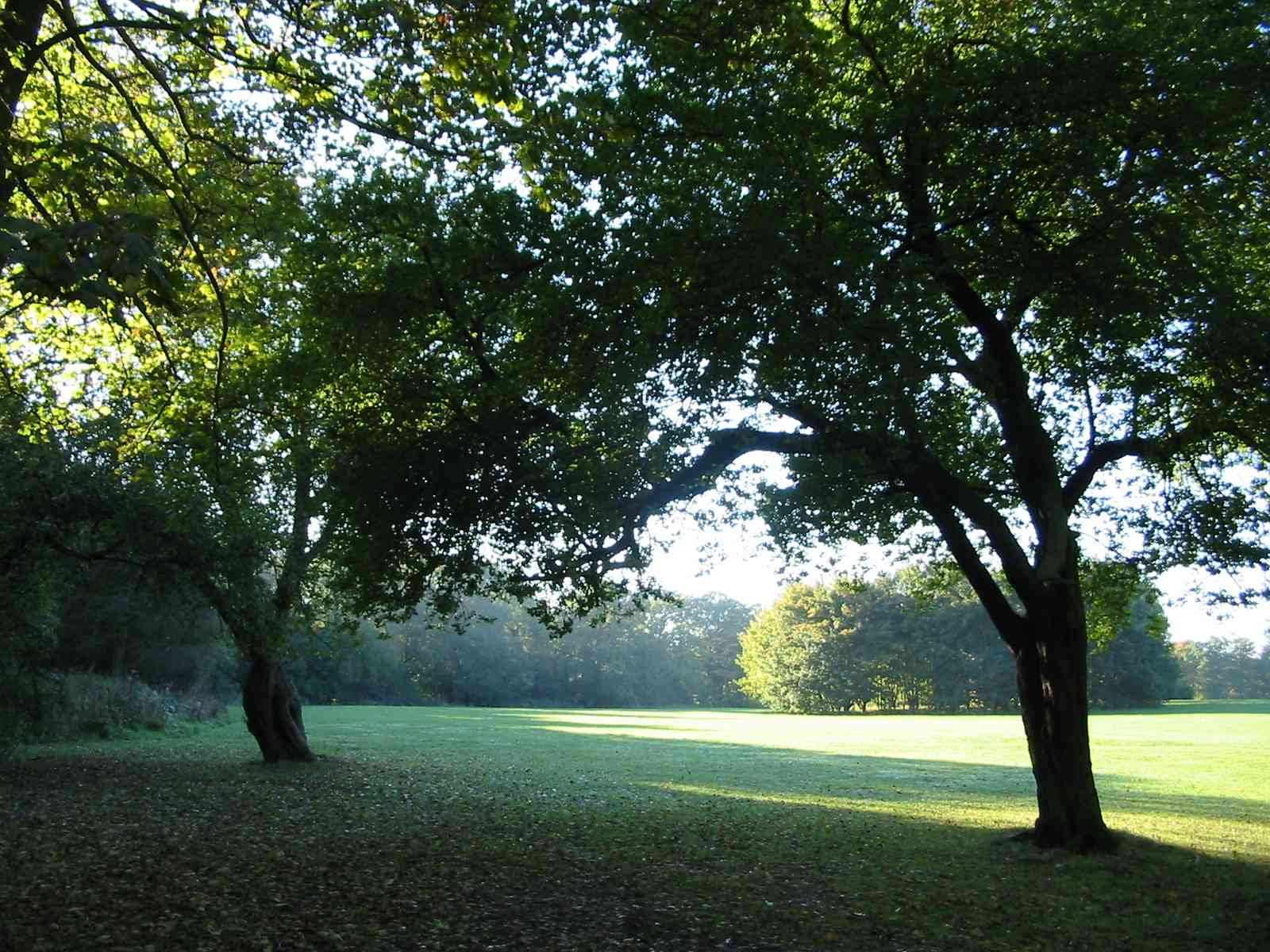
- Weelsby Woods in summer
- Interactive map of Weelsby Woods
- Type: Public park
- Location: Grimsby, North East Lincolnshire, England
- Coordinates: 53.552°N 0.065°W
- Area: 126.865 acres (51.340 ha)
- Created: 1951
- Operator: North East Lincolnshire Council
- Open: All year

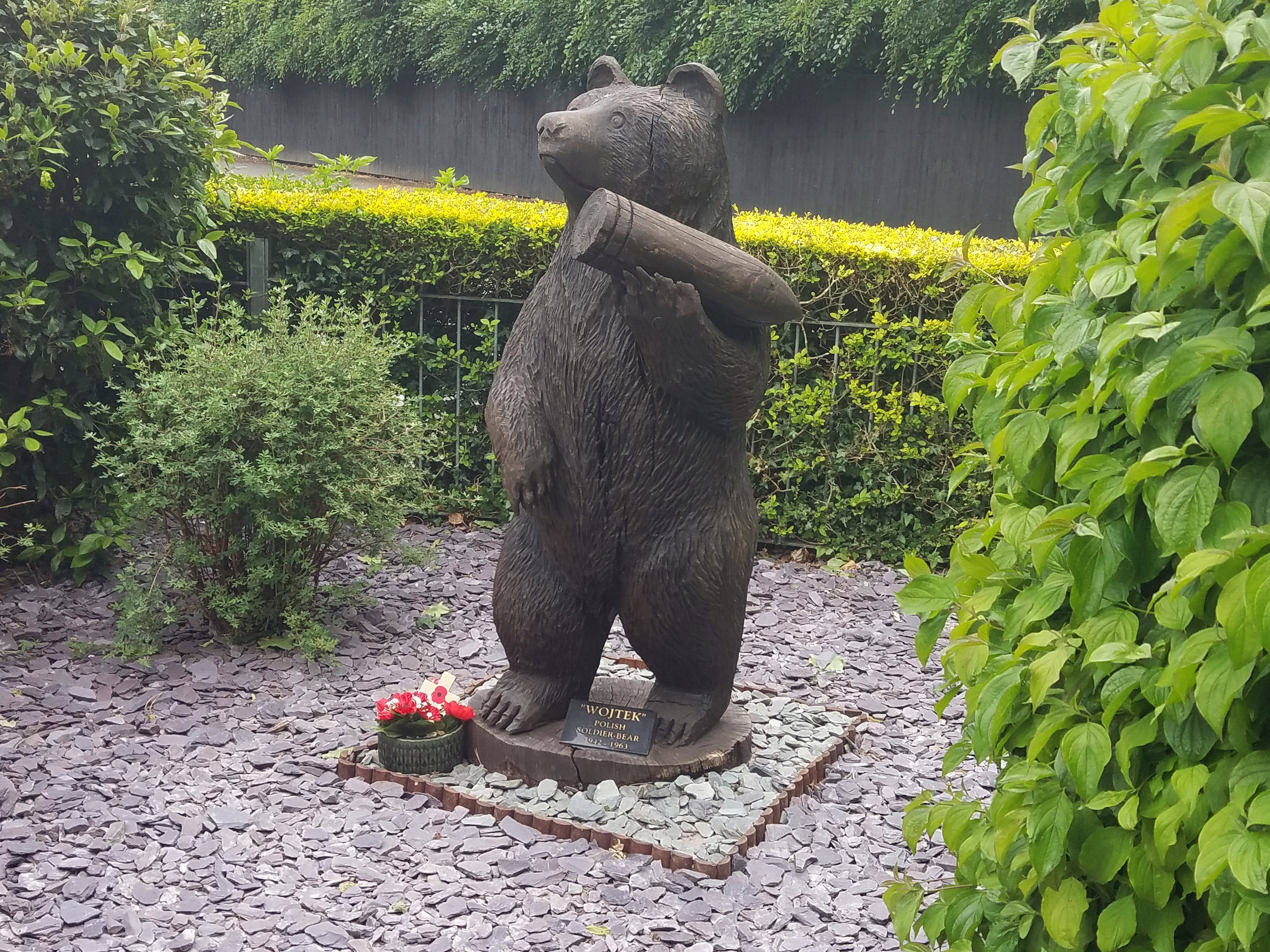
Sculpture of Wojtek the bear.

Weelsby Woods is a large public park in Grimsby, North East Lincolnshire. With mature trees, woodland, and large open grassy areas, the park is widely used for recreation.

== History ==
Weelsby Woods was used as a training camp during the First World War and was used to house Italian prisoners of war during the Second World War. The prison camp was surrounded by a perimeter fence and guarded by nine watchtowers. Between 60 and 70 prefabricated buildings were built to house prisoners of war, then after the war were used to house around 900 Polish soldiers in exile. The Polish soldiers, veterans of the Carpathian Lancers Regiment (2nd Polish Corps), were based in the area from 1945 to 1947 and are commemorated by a plaque and a statue of Wojtek the bear.

In response to inquiries from the town council, Fred Parkes, chairman and managing director of Boston Deep Sea Fishing and Ice Company, donated 126.865 acres of Weelsby Old Hall Woods to "the people of Grimsby" in November 1950. Weelsby Woods has since been administered as a public park.

=== Lions ===
Weelsby Woods is famous for the two large lion statues that stand, one on either side, of the main entrance. The lion statues were commissioned for the private residence of Tommy Campbell in 1876 and carved by the sculptor Richard Winn. The lions were moved to the entrance of Weelsby Woods in 1951 when the park was opened to the public.

The lions were removed for cleaning and refurbishment in 2006, during which course Leakes Masonry completely replaced the badly worn faces and tails. In 2013, the lions were vandalized with paint and were cleaned by being blasted with dry ice. One of the lions was damaged by a car in April 2023. The damaged lion was repaired by Booths Masonry, which replaced three of the four legs and the lion's face.
