= Peaks Parkway =

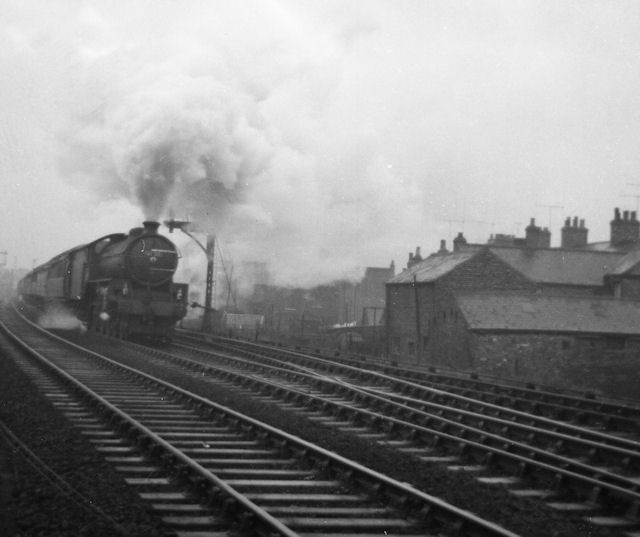
26 December 1958 Cleethorpes - Kings Cross express approaches Welholme Road level crossing at Hainton Street Halt.

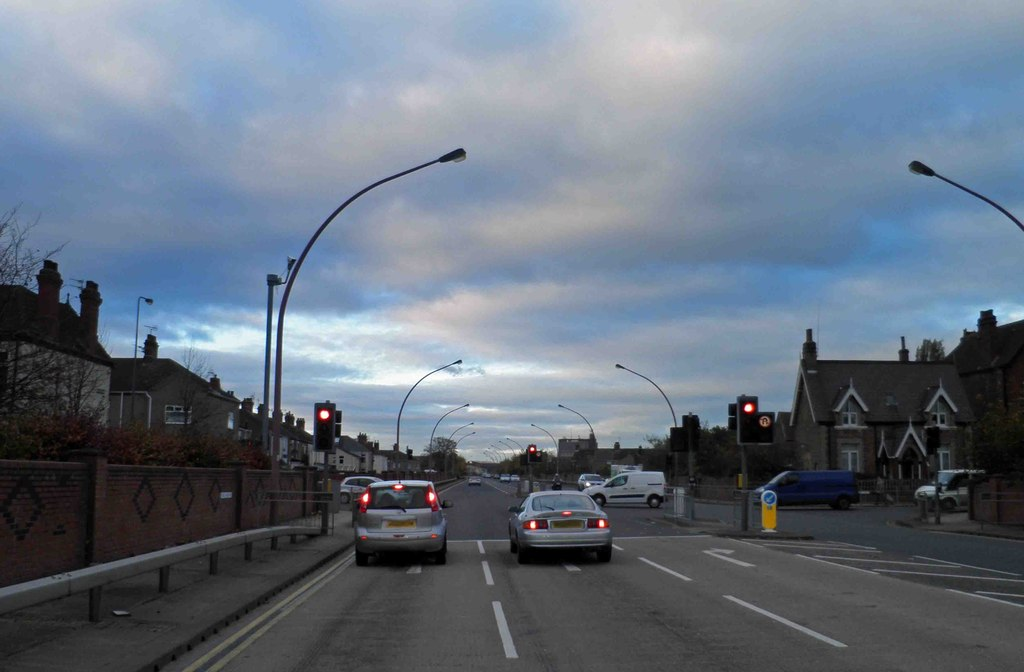
Welholme Street crossroads This is almost exactly the same spot as the photograph of the express train.

The Peaks Parkway is part of the northern end of the A16 road, in Grimsby, North East Lincolnshire, England. It was conceived in the 1970s and follows part of the trackbed of the former East Lincolnshire Railway between Grimsby and Louth.

Following on from public pressure, during 2014 North East Lincolnshire Council agreed to increase the speed limit on Peaks Parkway to 40 mph from the 30 mph previously in force, despite Safer Roads Humber advising the council to keep the 30 mph in force. Safer Roads Humber had been accused of using Peaks Parkway as a cash cow for funding, using SPECS average speed cameras as a revenue generator. Anyone unfamiliar with Peaks Parkway at first glance wouldn't imagine a major road of this standard would have a low speed limit of 30 mph. For example, pedestrians are prohibited from using Peaks Parkway.

== Background ==
When British Rail could no longer justify the maintenance of the Louth line, Grimsby Borough Council agreed to research the route as a major traffic artery into and through the town centre. Engineering Consultants were appointed and quickly confirmed the route would have strategic significance for the town and provide a link from the south to the A180 which was being constructed to the north of the urban area. Unusually the route would not require the demolition of any property. This plan was well received by the Councillors who had previously approved a traffic plan for the area which proposed the construction of a ring road and a road running alongside the route of the former railway into the town centre (Scott Wilson Kirkpatrick Report 1972). The route alongside the railway would have required the demolition of 480 properties but was justified on the benefits that the scheme would bring to the residents of the town as a whole through improved communication links. The Councillors were keen to support a road which could be built entirely within former railway land along the majority of its route and not require the demolition of any property.

A group of railway enthusiasts had obtained an option from British Rail to reactivate the line as a private public railway between Grimsby and Louth. This option was granted prior to the publication of the road proposals. However, the railway supporters faced an impossible task in raising sufficient funds to replace the many tonnes of ballast that had been sold off by British Rail upon the closure of the line as a working entity and eventually conceded that their plan would not materialise. The group went on to form the Lincolnshire Wolds Railway on a smaller section of the trackbed south of Grimsby.

=== Formation of Humberside County Council ===
Upon the formation of Humberside County Council in 1974, the former County Borough pressed the County to include the scheme for the construction of a road along the former railway line in the Capital Roads Programme. The County Council acceded to the request and together with a new road linking Baxtergate, near the Riverhead, to Hainton Square, was incorporated in the programme.

Under the leadership of John Board, Director of Development at Grimsby Borough Council, proposals for rejuvenating the Riverhead Shopping Centre in Grimsby Town Centre were created which included covering of the existing 1960's style open air shopping mall and an extension over the surrounding car parks. The team included officers of the Council; Keith Archer, Chief Planning Officer, Terry Thurogood, Senior Planning Officer, Allan Thompson, Chief Engineer, Graham Stafford, Chief Architect and Johnathan Sworn, Hammerson UK Ltd., their Architects, Building Design Partnership and representatives from Donaldson's the managing agents of the Centre.

In 1992, the Royal Town Planning Institute awarded the redesigned and renamed, Freshney Place Shopping Centre a Commendation Award.

=== The Bargate Scheme ===
Baxtergate was a two lane road which was located between the Riverhead Centre and the surrounding car parks and was left over after the ambitious plans for a Town Centre bypass were scuppered by a Public Inquiry into a scheme which required the widening of Bargate near to the junction with Dudley Street, Grosvenor Street and Cartergate. Originally, Baxtergate was planned to flow in a single direction around the back of the shopping centre where there would be bus stops to allow passengers to alight directly from the buses into the shopping centre. On the demise of the bypass scheme following a Public Inquiry, Baxtergate was retained as a one-way street in the opposite direction to that planned and four pedestrian underpasses were hurriedly constructed to allow pedestrians to cross from the surface car parks to the shopping centre without having to cross traffic and bus stops which were constructed on the car park side of the road.

The subways were a constant problem for the Council, being prone to flooding, dark and unattractive for pedestrians.

=== Baxtergate ===
The development team proposed the realignment of Baxtergate to a position alongside the bank of the River Freshney and Hammerson were encouraged to extend the shopping centre to the new alignment of the road, building two multi-storey car parks, one at each end of the development, to replace the surface level parking. The deal that was eventually approved by the Council, provided for the multi-storey car parks to be handed over to the Council for operation on completion so that the public car parking provision in the town centre could be co-ordinated. Subsequently, at the time that the payment for the area of the surface was due, Hammerson negotiated the retention of the cars parking under their control.

Humberside County Council, as highway authority, were persuaded that the relocation of Baxtergate was essential to the development of the Town Centre and as they would derive benefit from the sale of the land on which Baxtergate was located, they agreed in principle to the scheme. Principal Humberside County Council Technical Services Department officers involved at the time were Dave Rennie, Roger Williams, and Bob Keld.

== Phases of construction ==
Crucial to the scheme to enlarge the shopping centre was the linking of the realignment of Baxtergate to the railway route. Baxtergate realignment and its extension across the Riverhead to Victoria Street became Phase One. The construction of a new route from the Baxtergate / Victoria Street junction under the Grimsby to Cleethorpes railway ending at Hainton Square became Phase Two and the railway route from the Victoria Street junction to a new roundabout north of New Waltham became Phase Three.

=== Phase 1 ===
Humberside County Council, in close liaison with the Borough Council, constructed the new road to allow the expansion of the shopping centre and in honour of a highly regarded former Town Clerk of the County Borough of Grimsby, named the road Frederick Ward Way. Part of the scheme saw the creation of a riverside walkway adjacent to the River Freshney. A new footbridge erected by the Borough Council linked the Town Centre to the newly created National Fishing Heritage Centre. The project included a new bridge across the Riverhead (latterly called the 'Simwhite' Bridge after an earlier bridge in the town, and a road through the former Dial Square surface Car Park to Victoria Street North.

=== Phase 2 ===
The East Marsh Street link provided a direct link to Hainton Square and the Freeman Street shopping area and routed traffic away from the circuitous existing route which used Victoria Street, Pasture Street, Robinson Street East and East Marsh Street. This scheme required the construction of a subway beneath a live railway line in very poor ground and was completed just prior to the demise of Humberside County Council. A new junction with Railway Street was designed to accommodate traffic from a new retail store (Asda) which had been attracted by the prospects of improved traffic access to the area. At Hainton Square, a new traffic signal junction incorporating pedestrian crossing facilities was created. The completion of the construction of this part of the scheme was accompanied by extensive alterations to traffic flow along streets in the area and a major change was made on Eleanor Street which was made a 'One-Way' Street with easterly flow between Freeman Street and Convamore Road.

=== Phase 3 ===
The major part of the Peaks Parkway Scheme was the construction of the road along a portion of the former Grimsby to Louth railway line and this was undertaken by the new North East Lincolnshire Council, a Unitary Authority amalgamating the former Grimsby and Cleethorpes District Councils. Fortunately, the same officers that worked on the scheme prior to disbanding the County Council, were available to continue design work and implement the scheme without interruption. Phase 3, which was completed in 1998, created a new traffic signal junction at Victoria Street, Frederick Ward Way and Ellis Way (named after a prestigious Grimsby Councillor and former Mayor, Peter Ellis). A new underpass was built beneath Pasture Street and the Grimsby Town to Cleethorpes railway during which several night time rail line possessions from British Rail, to allow the bridge deck to be slid beneath the rail lines.

The construction of Phase 3 of Peaks Parkway attracted developers who considered how to make use of the new traffic routes and a new junction was built just north of a footpath link between Doughty Road and Catherine Street to service a new retail development including Halfords and B&Q. The footpath between Doughty Road and Catherine Street was maintained with the construction of a pedestrian subway which was decorated by a community group called 'Artlandish'. At this time extensive changes were made to traffic flows around the town centre and a 'one-way' system on Bethlehem Street, South St. Mary's Gate and Osborne Street reverted to two-way flow. The length of Victoria Street between East St. Mary's Gate and Old Market Place, and Old Market Place itself were paved and made pedestrian only with rear access provision being made for vehicles to allow deliveries to shops and offices. The creation of a traffic signal junction with Welholme Road saw the disappearance of a platform that previously served the Grimsby to Louth Railway and the level crossing but the former station master's house still exists.

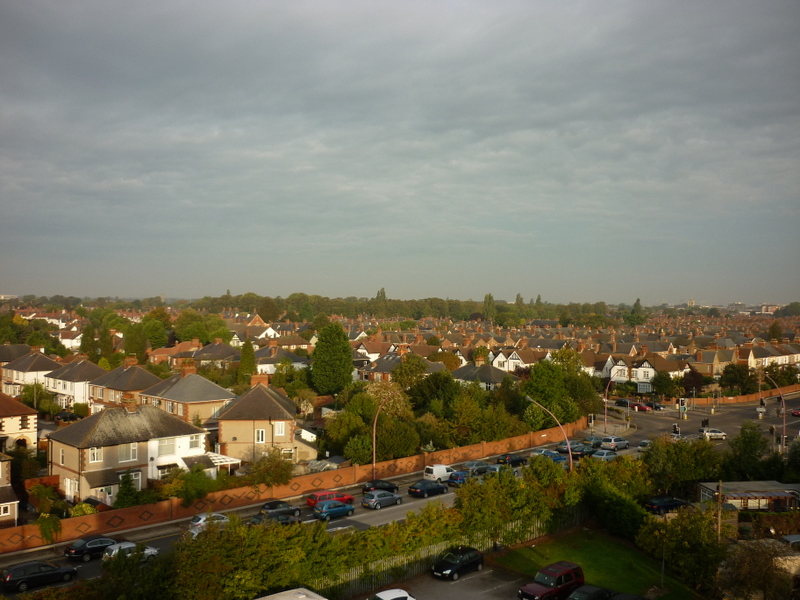
View from Peaks Lane Fire Station Tower, to the NorthWest The noise attenuation wall, with its geometric pattern, can be seen lining part of the former railway route.

Residential terraced houses in Highfield and Peakesfield Avenues which are built parallel to the railway line, were formerly part of the Lord Heneage Estate. The 'freehold' of some houses had been bought by occupants but the land owner of the majority of property was the Heneage Estate and compensation under The Land Compensation Act was negotiated. Properties, or parts of properties, where predicted noise levels were to be 1 decibel or more above 68 decibels were eligible for compensation. The effects of road noise were mitigated by the installation of sound double glazing to properties and construction of a brick, noise attenuation wall 2 metres (6 ft 7 in) high. Several designs for the wall were considered but architects eventually decided upon a geometric pattern of bricks in two colours.

The properties in Highfield and Peakesfield Avenues had been constructed some distance from the former railway line as a safety measure as steam powered locomotives were renowned for emitting sparks. A footpath in front of the houses was privately maintained and the area between the footpath and the bottom of the embankment on which the railway was built also belonged to some of the individual houses. Other properties had simply 'adopted' use of the land. Some of these private areas were poorly maintained and the council proposed to compulsory purchase the land and footpath to better provide for future maintenance. A Landscape Architect Consultant was appointed to develop a comprehensive scheme which was eventually agreed by residents and implemented with future maintenance being undertaken by the local authority.

As an adjunct to the major works, some accommodation work was undertaken in Ainslie Street Recreation Ground and Park, the site of a former cemetery, to install street lighting and footpaths. This part of the scheme drew attention because of the former use and due diligence was exercised by Engineers designing the scheme and contractors undertaking the work.

At Weelsby Road, there existed previously, a subway beneath the Grimsby to Louth Railway and to provide access to the new road, the subway was filled in and a new traffic signal junction created. A few residential properties were purchased by agreement and this allowed the construction of slip lanes from Weelsby Road to the new Peaks Parkway and Peaks Parkway itself to be widened to allow 2 lanes in each direction immediately at the junction.

In order to reduce problems caused by queuing traffic, traffic signals at the Hainton Avenue junction with Weelsby Road were linked to operate together with the new junction at Weelsby Road / Peaks Parkway. Pedestrian facilities were included in all new traffic signal installations. The Fire Brigade, from nearby Peaks Lane Fire Station are able to switch the signals to all-red to allow tenders to leave the station in an emergency situation, thereby improving response times.

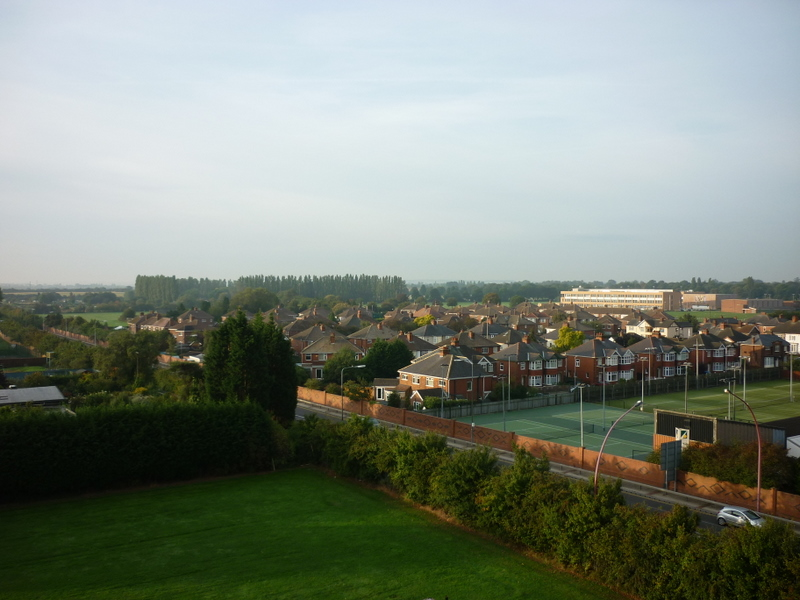
View from Peaks Lane Fire Station Tower, to the southwest The noise attenuation wall with its geometric pattern can be seen lining part of the former railway route.

The noise attenuation wall was continued south of the junction with Weelsby Road to shield all residential property which abutted the former railway. The new road along this section occupied less land than the former railway which was constructed on an embankment. After the completion of the scheme, land between the residential property boundaries and the noise attenuation wall was given to the property owners for a peppercorn lease to allow them to incorporate it within their property curtilage. It was anticipated in the design of the road that there would be no frontage access to the new road along the entire length between the New Waltham roundabout and Victoria Street. A former farm access bridge known locally as Peaks Tunnel, which was also used as part of a public footpath, was reconstructed on the existing location. Part way along the long straight section south of Weelsby Road, along the southern boundary of the YMCA grounds, a public footpath was constructed to link with Peaks Lane and continued south along the Peaks Parkway to the new roundabout north of New Waltham. From here the footpath continued into New Waltham along the route of the former railway to emerge on Station Road, New Waltham at the former level crossing.
