= List of windmills in Lincolnshire =

Extant (red) and former (blue) windmills in Lincolnshire.
1 Addlethorpe, 2 Alford, 3 Alkborough, 4 Barnetby, 5 Barrow upon Humber, 6 Barrow upon Humber, 7 Barton-upon-Humber, 8 Barton-upon-Humber, 9 Baston, 10 Belton, 11 Bilsby, 12 Blyton, 13 Brigg, 14 Burgh le Marsh, 15 Burgh le Marsh, 16 Butterwick, 17 Castlethorpe, 18 Corringham, 19 Corringham, 20 Cowbit, 21 Dyke, 22 East Kirkby, 23 Epworth, 24 Epworth, 25 Epworth, 26 Faldingworth, 27 Freiston, 28 Friskney, 29 Gainsborough, 30 Gedney Dyke, 31 Gedney Hill, 32 Gosberton, 33 Goxhill, 34 Grebby, 35 Hagworthingham, 36 Haxey, 37 Heapham, 38 Heckington, 39 Helpringham, 40 Hibaldstow, 41 Horncastle, 42 Huttoft, 43 Kirton End, 44 Kirton in Lindsey, 45 Langton, 46 Leadenham, 47 Leake Commonside, 48 Legbourne, 49 Lincoln, 50 Lincoln, 51 Long Sutton, 52 Long Sutton, 53 Lutton, 54 Maltby le Marsh, 55 Mareham le Fen, 56 Marsh Chapel, 57 Marton, 58 Metheringham, 59 Morton, 60 Moulton, 61 Moulton Chapel, 62 New Bolingbroke, 63 North Kelsey, 64 Oasby, 65 Old Bolingbroke, 66 Owston Ferry, 67 Penny Hill, 68 Pinchbeck, 69 Pinchbeck, 70 Saltfleet, 71 Saxilby, 72 Scopwick, 73 Scotter, 74 Scunthorpe, 75 Shepeau Stow, 76 Sibsey, 77 Sibsey, 78 Skirbeck, 79 Sleaford, 80 South Rauceby, 81 Stallingborough, 82 Stickford, 83 Stickney, 84 Sturton by Stow, 85 Sutterton, 86 Sutton Ings, 87 Sutton St James, 88 Swineshead, 89 Toynton All Saints, 90 Waddingham, 91 Wainfleet All Saints, 92 Wainfleet St Mary, 93 Waltham, 94 Wellingore, 95 West Butterwick, 96 Wildmore, 97 Wragby, 98 Wrangle, 99 Wrangle, 100 Wrawby.

A list of windmills in Lincolnshire, England.

== Locations ==
=== A ===
Location	Name of mill and grid reference	Type	Maps	First mention or built	Last mention or demise	Photograph
Addlethorpe	TF 552 675	Midlands post			Demolished c. 1830.	
Addlethorpe	Ingoldmells Mill; TF 552 675	Tower		c. 1830	Standing in 1986, since truncated. Windmill World	
Alford	Hoyles Mill (Note: Five sails); TF 457 765	Tower		1813	Windmill World	
Alford	Myer's Mill (Note: Six sails); TF 453 758	Tower		1827	Demolished 1978.	
Alford	Wallace's Mill; Station Mill; TF 444 755	Tower		1790	Demolished 1950s, two storey stump remains. Windmill World	
Alford		Tower			Demolished.	
Alkborough	Alkborough Mill; SE 883 215	Post			1853, later replaced by tower mill.	
Alkborough	Alkborough Mill; SE 883 215	Tower		1855	Windmill World	
Amber Hill	TF 229 460	Tower		Late 18th or early 19th century	A drainage mill, two storey stump remains, retaining its scoopwheel. Windmill World	
Amcotts	SE 853 137	Open trestle post		c. 1700	Demolished October 1898.	

=== B ===
Location	Name of mill and grid reference	Type	Maps	First mention or built	Last mention or demise	Photograph
Bardney	Bardney Mill; TF 120 696	Tower		1830	Demolished 1946.	
Barnetby	Top Mill; TA 066 096	Tower		Early 19th century	Windmill World	
Barrowby		Post			Standing 1923, gone by 1953	
Barrowby		Titt iron wind engine		1899		
Barrow upon Humber	Haven Mill; TA 062 229	Tower		1816	Standing in 1985, truncated to four storeys. Windmill World	
Barrow upon Humber	Pearson's Mill; TA 059 216	Tower		1869	Demolished c.1920. Two storey stump survives. Windmill World	
Barrow upon Humber	TA 066 213	Tower			Demolished early 1970s.	
Barrow upon Humber	Riggs Mill	Tower		1923	1953.	
Barton-upon-Humber	Bank Mill; Sisson's Mill; TA 028 231	Tower			Demolished 1946.	
Barton-upon-Humber	Hewson's Mill; TA 027 226	Tower		1813	Windmill World	
Barton-upon-Humber	Caistor Road Mill; Waterworks Mill; TA 037 211	Tower			Standing 1978, gone by 1983.	
Barton-upon-Humber	Ferriby Road Mill; Milson's Mill; TA 025 219	Tower		1878	Demolished 1934.	
Barton-upon-Humber	Market Place; TA 032 217	Tower			Demolished 1810.	
Barton-upon-Humber	Market Place Mill; King's Garth Mill; Kirkby's Mill; TA 032 217	tower mill		1810	Windmill World	
Baston	Hudson's Mill; TF 116 132	Tower		1806	Windmill World	
Baston	Baston Fen	Smock				
Belchford		Post				
Belton	Westgate Mill; SE 770 075	Tower		Early 19th century	Windmill World	
Bennington		Tower			Standing in 1923, gone by 1953.	
Benniworth	TF 229 834	Tower	1888; 1892		Shown as disused on 1899 to 1951 OS maps, gone on 1956 map	
Bicker	TF 227 374	Tower			Burnt down 1936.	
Billinghay	East Mill; TF 153 552	Post			Demolished 1844.	
Billinghay	East Mill; TF 153 552	Tower		1844	Windmill World	
Billinghay	West Mill; TF 144 551	Tower		1806	Demolished 1960s. Two storey stump remains. Windmill World	
Billinghay		Smock			Standing in 1923	
Bilsby	TF 470 766	Post			Demolished 1861.	
Bilsby	Bilsby Mill; TF 470 766	Tower		1861	Windmill World	
Binbrook		Post			Demolished 1879.	
Binbrook	Binbrook Mill; TF 209 938	Tower		1879	Standing in 1939, gone by 1945.	
Blyton	Blyton Mill; SK 852 948	Tower		1825	Windmill World	
Boston		Post				
Boston	Day's Mill; TF 313 437	Tower		1923	Stump sanding in 1953, gone by 1979	
Boston		Smock			Standing in 1923	
Boston	Paint Mill	Tower		1812		
Boston	Tuxford's Mill (Note: Eight sails)	Tower		1813	Demolished 1891	
Bourne	Wherry's Mill; TF 096 212	Tower		1832	Demolished 1915. Two storey stump remains.	
Bourne	Dyke Mill; TF 103 226	Smock		c.1845		
Brant Broughton		Tower		1923	Gone by 1953.	
Bressingham		Post				
Brigg	Bell's Mill; SE 996 065	Tower		1837	Windmill World	
Brigg	Bratley's Mill; Mill Place Mill	Tower			Demolished 1930	
Brigg	Scawby Brook Mill; SE 987 067	Tower			Demolished 1930s.	
Broughton	Casstlethorpe Mill; SE 986 972	Tower	1804			
Burgh le Marsh	TF 497 650	Post			1842, gone by 1855.	
Burgh le Marsh	Hansons Mill; West End Mill; TF 497 650	Tower		1855	Demolished 1985. Windmill World	
Burgh le Marsh	Dobson's Mill; TF 503 649	Tower		1844	Windmill World	
Burnham		Tower		1923	1953.	
Burton upon Stather	SE 874 172	Post		1732	Demolished late 1920s Windmill World	
Butterwick	Butterwick Mill; TF 385 455	Tower		1871	Windmill World	

=== C ===
Location	Name of mill and grid reference	Type	Maps	First mention or built	Last mention or demise	Photograph
Caistor	Wright's Mill; TA 125 007	Tower		Early 19th century	Windmill World	
Carlby		Tower			Standing in 1923, gone by 1953	
Carleton-le-Moorland	SK 897 585	Post		1811	Collapsed 1935	
Carrington	TF 311 534	Tower			Standing 1950s, gone by the early 1970s	
Castlethorpe	Artie's Mill; SE 986 072	Tower		1804	Windmill World	
Cleethorpes		Tower			Standing in 1932, gone by 1953	
Cleethorpes	Mill Road Mill	Tower		c. 1815	Demolished 1920s	
Cleethorpes	Mill Place Mill	Tower				
Coleby Heath		Tower			Burnt down 1863	
Coleby Heath	Coleby Heath Mill; SK 989 603	Tower		1863	Demolished 1942	
Coleby Lodge	Coleby Lodge Mill	Tower			Standing in 1923, gone by 1953	
Coningsby	Coningsby Mill; TF 224 579	Tower		1826	Demolished 1970	
Corringham	Winter's Mill; West Mill; SK 863 916	Tower		Early 19th century	Windmill World	
Corringham	Little Corringham Mill; East Mill; SK 879 909	Tower		Early 19th century	Windmill World	
Covenham St Bartholomew		Post				
Cowbit	Cowbit Mill; TF 265 179	Tower		1798	Windmill World	
Croft	Croft Mill; TF 501 596	Tower		1814	Demolished 1949; Windmill World	
Crowland	Postland Road Mill	Midlands Post				
Crowland	TF 236 101	Tower			Standing in 1923, gone by 1953; Windmill World	
Crowle	Godnow Road Mill; SE 772 123	Tower			Standing in the 1950s, gone by the 1970s	
Crowle	Mill Road Mill; SE 776 132	Tower			Demolished 1950s or 1960s	
Crowle		Post				

=== D, E ===
Location	Name of mill and grid reference	Type	Maps	First mention or built	Last mention or demise	Photograph
Deeping Fen		Smock			Moved to Holbeach Hurn	
Deeping St James	TF 156 099	Tower			Demolished 1960	
Digby		Post		1830	Moved to Kirkby Green, c. 1865	
Dogdyke	Chapel Hill Mill; TF 208 539	Tower		1838	Standing in 1923, gone by 1953; Windmill World	
Donington	Baxter's Mill; TF 218 349	Tower		1819	Demolished 1913; Windmill World	
Donington	Rippon's Mill; TF 204 355	Tower				
Drayton		Tower			Demolished 1926	
Dyke	Dyke Mill; TF 103 226	Smock		1845	Windmill World	
East Halton		Smock				
East Kirkby	East Kirkby Mill; TF 333 623	Tower		1820	Windmill World	
Epworth	Brook's Mill; White Mill; SE 781 045	Tower		1812	Windmill World	
Epworth	Maws Mill; SE 777 047	Tower		1783	Windmill World	
Epworth	Thompson's Mill; SE 784 034	Tower		Early 19th century	Windmill World	
Epworth	Subscription Mill	Tower		1805	Demolished 1921	

=== F ===
Location	Name of mill and grid reference	Type	Maps	First mention or built	Last mention or demise	Photograph
Faldingworth		Midlands Post		17th century	Blown down c. 1919	
Faldingworth	Stamp's Mill; TF 068 849	Tower		c. 1822	Windmill World	
Folkingham		Post			Standing 1923, gone by 1953	
Fosdyke	Fosdyke Ferry Mill	Smock				
Foston		Post		1700	Moved to new site in Foston 1760	
Foston	SK 860 423	Midlands Post		1760	Demolished 1966	
Freiston		Smock			Burnt down 1918	
Freiston Shore	Freiston Shore Mill; TF390428	Tower		c. 1827	Standing in 1923, gone by 1953; Windmill World	
Friskney	Toft Mill; TF 481 554	Post		1730	Blown down November 1939	
Friskney	Hoyle's Mill; TF 481 567	Tower		Early 19th century	Windmill World	
Friskney	Kitching's Mill; TF 466 547	Tower		1824	Standing in the 1950s, gone by the early 1970s	
Frithville	Mount Pleasant Mill; TF 320 505	Tower				
Fulstow	TF 330 965	Post			Demolished mid-19th century	
Fulstow	TF 330 965	Tower		c. 1872	Demolished early 1970s Windmill World	

=== G ===
Location	Name of mill and grid reference	Type	Maps	First mention or built	Last mention or demise	Photograph
Gainsborough	Ashcroft Mill	Post		1747	Demolished 1826	
Gainsborough	Ashcroft Mill; Floss Mill	Tower		1826	Standing in 1923, gone by 1953	
Gainsborough	Luke Martyn's Mill	Tower		1709	Burnt down 1754	
Gainsborough	Morehouse's Mill	Tower			Burnt down 1787	
Gainsborough	Bridge Mill	Tower		Late 18th century	Demolished 1916	
Gainsborough	Union Mill; SK 806 907	Tower		c. 1804	Standing 1920s, gone by 1939	
Gainsborough	Spital Hill Mill; SK 822 904	Tower		1816	Windmill World	
Gainsborough	Ashcroft Mill	Post		1747	Demolished 1826	
Gainsborough	Ashcroft Mill	Tower		1846		
Gedney				1256	1256	
Gedney		Post				
Gedney	Gedney Fen Mill	Post				
Gedney Drove End	TF 464 294	Tower			Standing in 1923, gone by 1953	
Gedney Dyke	Gedney Dyke Mill; TF 416 262	Tower		1836	Windmill World	
Gedney Hill	Gedney Hill Mill; TF 334 116	Tower		1824	Dismantled late 1920s Windmill World	
Gosberton	Green's Mill; TF 204 297	Tower		c. 1824	Standing in the 1950s, gone by the late 1970s	
Gosberton	Risegate Mill; TF221 301	Tower		1824	Windmill World	
Goulceby	TF 254 796		1888		Gone on the 1906 OS map	
Goxhill		Post				
Goxhill	Goxhill Mill; TA 093 208	Tower		1833	Windmill World 1907	
Grainthorpe	Grainthorpe Mill; TF 382 970	Tower		Early 19th century	Windmill World	
Grasby	TA 092 051	Post		1840s	Demolished early 1920s Windmill World	
Grebby	TF 438 684	Post			Demolished 1812	
Grebby	Grebby Mill; TF 438 684	Tower		1812	Windmill World	
Grimoldby		Tower			Standing in 1923, gone by 1953	
Grimsby		Post		1201	1201	
Grimsby	Catergate Mill	Post			Demolished 1848	
Grimsby		Post			Moved to Tetney	
Grimsby	Old Cemetery	Smock			Standing in 1923	
Grimsby	East Street Mill	Tower				
Gringley-on-the-Hill		Post		1815	Moved to Hemswell c. 1855	

=== H ===
Location	Name of mill and grid reference	Type	Maps	First mention or built	Last mention or demise	Photograph
Hackthorn		Post			Standing in 1923, gone by 1953	
Hagworthingham	Hagworthingham Mill; TF 344 697	Tower		1816	Windmill World	
Halton Holegate		Post			Demolished 1814	
Halton Holegate	TF 414 646	Tower		1814	Demolished c. 1963	
Hanthorpe		Tower				
Haxey	Low Burnham Mill; SE 773 012	Tower		1811	Windmill World	
Haxey	SE 761 997	Tower			Burnt down 1823	
Haxey	Haxey Mill; SE 761 997	Tower		1823	Standing in 1923, gone by 1953; Windmill World	
Heapham	SK 873 887	Post			Demolished 1876	
Heapham	Hewitt's Mill; SK 873 887	Tower		1876	Windmill World	
Heckington	Mowbrays Mill; TF 135 442	Tower		Early 19th century	Truncated 1931; Windmill World	
Heckington	Pocklington's Mill	Tower		1830	Blown down 1890	
Heckington	Pocklington's Mill; TF 145 435	Tower		1891	Windmill World	
Heckington		Tower			Burnt down 1894	
Helpringham	Helpringham Mill; TF 135 405	Tower		1864	Windmill World	
Hemingby	TF 241 741	Tower		1824	Burnt down 1937; Windmill World	
Hemingby		Tower		1825	Standing in 1923, gone by 1953	
Hemswell	Roving Molly	Post		c. 1855	Demolished 1935	
Hibaldstow		Post			Demolished c. 1802	
Hibaldstow	Reeson's Mill; SE 982 028	Tower		1802	Windmill World	
Hogsthorpe	TF 533 724	Tower		c. 1803	Standing in 1945; Windmill World	
Holbeach	Damgate Mill; TF 364 239	Tower		1816	Demolished 1960s	
Holbeach	Tindall's Mill; Barrington Gate Mill/> TF 359 224	Tower		1828		
Holbeach	Holbeach Hurn	Smock				
Holbeach	Holbeach Hurn	Smock		1665	Demolished April 1914	
Holbeach	Satterday Bridge	Smock		1588		
Horncastle	Low Toynton Road Mill	Post				
Horncastle	Spilsby Road Mill; TF 266 696	Tower		1843	Windmill World	
Horncastle	Louth Road Mill	Tower				
Horsington	Green's Mill; TF 191 683	Tower		c. 1813	Windmill World	
Horsington	Hill's Mill; TF 196 695	Tower				
Humby (Note: The neighbouring villages of Great Humby and Little Humby.)	Humby Mill; TF 005 339	Tower			Standing in the 1930s, gone by 1953	
Huttoft	Huttoft Mill; TF 514 767	Tower		c. 1844	Windmill World	

=== I - K ===
Location	Name of mill and grid reference	Type	Maps	First mention or built	Last mention or demise	Photograph
Ingham	Ingham Mill; SK 942 836	Tower		1872	Windmill World	
Ingham	SK 957 832	Tower			Standing in 1953, gone by 1977	
Keadby	SE 836 111	Tower			Standing in 1953, gone by 1978	
Kexby	Willingham Mill; SK 872 853	Tower			Standing in the 1930s, gone by 1953	
Kexby	Upton Mill; Subscription Mill; SK 871 860				Demolished 1856	
Kexby	Britannia Mills; SK 871 860	Tower		1856	Demolished c. 1973	
Kirkby Green	TF 094 578	Midlands Post		c. 1865	Collapsed 1935	
Kirkstead	TF 176 626	Post			Demolished late 19th century	
Kirkstead	Kirkstead Mill; TF 176 626	Tower		Windmill World	Standing in 1923, gone by 1953	
Kirton End	TF 289 402	Post			Demolished 1833	
Kirton End	Kirton Mill; TF 289 402	Tower		1833	Windmill World	
Kirton in Lindsey	SK 939 994	Post			Demolished 1875	
Kirton in Lindsey	Mount Pleasant Mill; SK 939 994	Tower		1875	Windmill World	
Kirton in Lindsey	Saw mill	Tower		1809		
Kirton in Lindsey		Post				

=== L ===
Location	Name of mill and grid reference	Type	Maps	First mention or built	Last mention or demise	Photograph
Laceby		Tower				
Langton	TF 244 694	Post			Demolished 1861	
Langton	Langton Mill; TF 244 694	Tower		1861	Windmill World	
Langworth		Tower			Standing in 1923, gone by 1953	
Langworth	TF 064 764	Smock		Early 19th century	Demolished 1950s or 1960s	
Laughterton		Post		1787	Moved to new site in Laughterton	
Laughterton	SK 834 757	Midlands Post			Dismantled 1951	
Leadenham	SK 921 532	Post			Demolished 1840	
Leadenham	Lowfield Mill; SK 921 532	Tower		1840	Windmill World	
Leake Commonside	Goslings Mill; TF 401 523	Tower		1829	Demolished c. 1970	
Leake Commonside	Howsam's Mill; TF 398 521	Tower		1859		
Legbourne	Legbourne Mill; TF 362 842	Tower		1847	Windmill World	
Lincoln	St Catherine's Priory			1285	1285	
Lincoln		Midlands Post				
Lincoln	Le Tall's Mill; SK 971 703	Tower		Late 1840s	Windmill World	
Lincoln	Rope Lane Mill	Tower		1845		
Lincoln	Ellis' Mill; SK 971 722	Tower		1798	Windmill World	
Lincoln	Mill Road Mill; SK 974 724	Tower			Standing in the 1930s, gone by 1953	
Lincoln		Tower				
Lincoln	St Peters at Gowts	Tower		1819		
Lincoln					Blown down 7 January 1839.	
Long Bennington		Post				
Long Sutton	Brunswick Mill; TF 440 221	Tower		1817	Windmill World	
Long Sutton	Harrison's Mill; Roman Bank Mill; TF 438 228	Tower		1843	Windmill World	
Louth	Hubbard's Mill	Tower				
Louth	Charles Street Mill	Tower				
Louth	Topham's Mill	Tower		1831		
Luddington	SE 828 174	Tower		Early 19th century	Demolished 1950s Windmill World	
Ludford Magna	TF 201 895	Tower	1888; 1891; 1906; 1907; 1956	1889	Part demolished 1932, 3 storey stump remains Windmill World	
Ludford Parva	TF 194 892	Midlands Post	1888; 1891; 1906; 1907		Gone on the 1956 OS Map	
Lutton	Sutton Bank Mill; Lutton Gowts Mill; Sneath's Mill; TF 436 243	Tower		1779	Windmill World	

=== M ===
Location	Name of mill and grid reference	Type	Maps	First mention or built	Last mention or demise	Photograph
Maltby le Marsh	Maltby le Marsh Mill; TF 470 820	Tower		1841	Windmill World	
Mareham le Fen	Mareham le Fen Mill; TF 281 610	Tower		c. 1820	Windmill World	
Market Rasen		Tower				
Market Rasen		Smock			Moved to Langworth early 19th century	
Marshchapel	TF 362 993	Post			Demolished 1835	
Marshchapel	Marshchapel Mill; TF 362 993	Tower		1835	Windmill World	
Martin	Farbon's Mill	Tower		1820		
Marton	Marton Mill; SK 834 816	Tower		1799	Windmill World	
Metheringham	Old Meg; TF 064 613	Tower		1867	Windmill World	
Metheringham	Scots Hole Mill; TF 122 643	Tower				
Middle Rasen	TF 091 888	Tower		1827	Demolished 1932; Windmill World	
Minting		Post				
Morton	Morton Mill; SK 810 921	Tower		1820	Windmill World	
Moulton		Smock			Demolished 1826	
Moulton		Tower		1826		
Moulton	Moulton Mill; TF 307 240	Tower		c. 1822	Windmill World	
Moulton Chapel	TF 294 182	Post			Demolished 1865	
Moulton Chapel	Moulton Chapel Mill; TF 294 182	Tower		1865	Windmill World	
Moulton Seas End		Tower		1810	Standing in 1923, gone by 1953	
Mumby		Post		1688		

=== N, O ===
Location	Name of mill and grid reference	Type	Maps	First mention or built	Last mention or demise	Photograph
New Bolingbroke	Rundle's Mill; TF 307 585	Tower		Mid-19th century	Windmill World	
New Bolingbroke	Watkinson's Mill; TF 294 573	Tower		c. 1821	Windmill World	
Normanby by Spital	SK 994 878	Tower			Demolished 1965	
North Carlton				1256	1256	
Hykeham Moor	SK 934 663	Post		1751	Collapsed 1935	
North Hykeham	SK 940 656	Tower		1830	Demolished c. 1925; Windmill World	
North Kelsey	Old Mill TA 044 004 (Mill Hill)	Post		Shown on 1820 Map	standing in 1840 since demolished	
North Kelsey	New Mill; TA 036 013	Tower		Early 19th century	Windmill World	
North Somercotes	Axe and Cleaver Mill	Tower				
North Somercotes	Cartwright's Mill	Tower		1797	Standing in 1953, gone by 1978	
North Thoresby		Post				
Oasby	Oasby Mill; SK 996 387	Tower		1810	1929; Windmill World	
Oasby		Post				
Old Bolingbroke	Old Bolingbroke Mill; TF 339 642	Tower		Early 19th century	Windmill World	
Old Leake		Tower		1874		
Osbournby		Post				
Owston Ferry	Fletcher's Mill; SE 817 004	Tower			Burnt down 1937	
Owston Ferry	Lilley's Mill; SK 815 992	Tower		Early 19th century	Windmill World	
Owston Ferry		Tower				

=== P, Q ===
Location	Name of mill and grid reference	Type	Maps	First mention or built	Last mention or demise	Photograph
Penny Hill	TF 358 267	Smock			Demolished 1826	
Penny Hill	Penny Hill Mill; TF 358 267	Tower	Windmill World	1826		
Pickworth	TF 042 342	Post			Demolished early 19th century	
Pickworth	TF 042 342	Tower		Early 19th century	Windmill World	
Pinchbeck	Glenside Mill; Speed's Mill; West Mill; TF 206 252	Tower		1812	Windmill World	
Pinchbeck	Horse and Jockey Mill; TF 202 262	Tower		c. 1803	Standing in the late 1940s, gone by 1977	
Pinchbeck	TF 206 252	Post			Demolished 1848	
Pinchbeck	Northgate Mill; Seller's Mill; TF 227 260	Tower		1848	Windmill World	
Pinchbeck	Risegate Mill; TF 221 301	Tower			Windmill World	
Potterhanworth	TF 054 664	Tower			Standing in the 1930s, gone by 1953	
Quadring	Judy Cross Mill	Tower		c. 1808	Standing in 1923, gone by 1953	

=== R, S ===
Location	Name of mill and grid reference	Type	Maps	First mention or built	Last mention or demise	Photograph
Ropsley	SK 991 340	Tower		Mid-19th century	Demolished late 1950s Windmill World	
Saltfleet	Saltfleet Mill; TF 456 936	Tower		1770	Windmill World	
Saxby				1249	1249	
Saxby All Saints	SE 994 177	Tower			Demolished 1960s	
Saxilby	Saxilby Mill; SK 892 748	Tower		1823	Windmill World	
Scamblesby		Tower			Standing in 1923, gone by 1953	
Scartho	Heaton's Mill	Post		1870		
Scartho	Scartho Mill; TA 267 071	Tower		1869	Standing in the 1950s, gone by 1978	
Scawby	Scawby Mill; SE 972 058	Tower		1827	Windmill World	
Scopwick	Scopwick Mill; TF 058 576	Tower		1827	Windmill World	
Scotter	SE 883 005	Post			Demolished 1874	
Scotter	Scotter Mill; SE 883 005	Tower		1874	Windmill World	
Scredington				1256	1256	
Scrub Hill		Tower				
Scunthorpe	SE 902 113	Post			Demolished 1858	
Scunthorpe	Long's Mill; SE 902 113	Tower		1858	Windmill World	
Shepeau Stow	Lawson's Mill; TF 308 123	Tower	1800		Windmill World	
Sibsey	Rhoade's Mill; TF 352 514	Tower		1823	Windmill World	
Sibsey	TF 344 510	Post			Demolished 1877	
Sibsey	Trader Mill; TF 344 510	Tower		1877	Windmill World Sibsey Trader Windmill	
Skirbeck	Maud Foster Mill; Ostler's Mill; TF 332 447	Tower		1819	Windmill World	
Skirbeck	Thompson's Mill; TF 334 449	Tower		c. 1730	Standing late 1950s, gone by the early 1970s	
Skirbeck		Tower				
Sleaford	Money's Mill; TF 069 456	Tower		1798	Windmill World	
South Killingholme	TA 152 153	Midlands Post		1716	Demolished 1935	
South Kyme	TF 169 498	Tower			Standing in 1953, gone by the early 1970s	
South Rauceby	South Rauceby Mill; TF 024 457	Tower		1841	Windmill World	
South Willingham	South Willingham Mill; TF 182 824	Tower	1887; 1891; 1906; 1907; 1951; 1956	Miller mentioned in the 1861 census	Sails removed 1935; Demolished 1958	
South Witham	SK 924 192	Tower		1793	Standing in the 1930s, gone by 1953; Windmill World	
Spalding	Beeby's Mill	Tower		c. 1808	Standing in 1923, gone by 1953	
Spalding	Common Mill; TF 234 201	Tower		c. 1816	Demolished 1943; Windmill World	
Spalding	Little London Mill; TF 234 211	Tower			Demolished 1948	
Spalding	Lock Mill	Smock				
Spalding	Rose's Mill	Tower				
Spalding	Birch's Mill	Tower				
Stallingborough	TA 191 106	Tower			Demolished 1875	
Stallingborough	Stallingborough Mill; TA 191 106	Tower		1875	Windmill World	
Stamford	TF 020 074	Tower				
Stickford	Stickford Mill; TF 346 589	Tower		1820	Windmill World	
Stickney		Post				
Stickney	Stickney Mill; TF 345 569	Tower		1842	Windmill World	
Sturton by Stow	Subscription Mill; SK 881 804	Tower		1815	Windmill World	
Surfleet		Post		1509	Demolished 1912	
Sutterton	Sutterton Mill; TF 273 359	Tower		1855	Windmill World	
Sutton-on-Sea	Sutton Ings Windpump; TF 503 807	Tower		mid-to-late 19th century	Windmill World	
Sutton St James	Ives Cross Mill; TF 389 191	Tower		1828		
Sutton Wash		Vertical axle mill		1807	Demolished 1810	
Swaby	White Pit Mill; TF 380 769	Tower		1812	Demolished 1986; Windmill World	
Swineshead	Houlder's Mill; TF 240 404	Tower		1833	Standing in the 1950s, gone by the early 1970s	
Swineshead	TF 229 415				Demolished c. 1821	
Swineshead	North End Mill; TF 229 415	Tower		c. 1821	Windmill World	

=== T, U ===
Location	Name of mill and grid reference	Type	Maps	First mention or built	Last mention or demise	Photograph
Tetney		Post				
Tetney		Smock			Standing in 1923	
Theddlethorpe All Saints		Tower				
Theddlethorpe St Helen	TF 472 873	Tower		1833	Standing in 1953, gone by 1978	
Thornton le Fen					Blown down 23 January 1840.	
Toynton All Saints	TF 392 640	Post			Demolished early 19th century	
Toynton All Saints	Toynton All Saints Mill; TF 392 640	Tower		Early 19th century	Windmill World	
Trusthorpe		Post			Burnt down 1783	
Trusthorpe		Post		1783	Demolished 1901	
Trusthorpe	TF 513 840	Tower		1880	Demolished 1935; Windmill World	
Ulceby		Post				
Upton	Subscription Mill	Tower			Standing in 1923, gone by 1953	

=== W ===
Location	Name of mill and grid reference	Type	Maps	First mention or built	Last mention or demise	Photograph
Waddingham	SK 981 961				Demolished early 19th century	
Waddingham	Anderson's Mill; SK 981 961	Tower		Early 19th century	Windmill World	
Waddington	SK 974 634	Post			Demolished 1820	
Waddington	Worsdell's Mill; SK 974 634	Tower		1820	Demolished c. 1940; Windmill World	
Wainfleet	Salem Bridge Mill; TF 495 586	Tower		c. 1820	Windmill World	
Wainfleet All Saints	All Saints Mill	Tower		1814		
Wainfleet St Mary	Key's Toft Mill; TF 490 582	Tower		Early 19th century	Windmill World	
Waltham	TA 259 033	Post			Blown down December 1873	
Waltham	Waltham Mill; TA 259 033	Tower			Windmill World	
Waltham	Church Mill					
Welbourne	SK 974 535	Tower		1833	Windmill World	
Wellingore	SK 984 570	Tower		18th century	Demolished 1854	
Wellingore	Wellingore Mill; SK 984 570	Tower		1854	Windmill World	
West Butterwick	West Butterwick Mill; SE 836 066	Tower		1824	Windmill World	
West Kinnald Ferry		Tower				
West Stockwith		Tower				
Weston	Weston Hills Mill	Midlands Post				
Whaplode		Tower				
Whaplode Drove		Tower				
Whitton		Tower		1824	1933	
Wildmore	Haven Bank Mill; TF 241 533	Tower		c. 1810	Windmill World	
Willingham by Stow		Tower			Standing in 1923, gone by 1953	
Willoughby		Post				
Winteringham	Winteringham Mill	Tower		1796	1796	
Winterton		Tower		1821		
Winterton	Fletcher's Mill	Tower				
Withern	Tickler's Mill	Post				
Worlaby	TA 001 131	Tower			Standing in the 1930s, gone by 1978	
Woolsthorpe	Stenwith Mill; SK 836 363	Tower			Windmill World	
Woolsthorpe		Tower				
Wragby	Wragby Mill; TF 131 778	Tower		1831	Windmill World	
Wrangle	Lowgate Mill	Tower			Standing in 1923, gone by 1953	
Wrangle	Sea Dyke Mill	Tower			Standing in 1923, gone by 1953	
Wrangle	Tofts Mill; TF 443 516	Tower		1824	Windmill World	
Wrangle	Wrangle Mill; TF 439 511	Tower			Windmill World	
Wrawby	Wrawby Mill; TA 026 087	Midlands Post		Mid-late 18th century	Windmill World	
Wyberton		Post				
Wyberton	TF 306 428	Tower		Early 19th century	Standing in 1923, gone by 1935	

== Maps ==
- 1824 Ordnance Survey

== Notes ==
Mills in bold are still standing, known building dates are indicated in bold. Text in italics denotes indicates that the information is not confirmed, but is likely to be the case stated.

== Sources ==
Unless indicated otherwise, the source for all entries is

- **Wailes, Rex (1991). Lincolnshire Windmills. Heckington: Friends of Heckington Mill. ISBN 0-9518795-0-2.** and/or
- **Dolman, Peter (1986). Lincolnshire Windmills, a contemporary survey. Lincoln: Lincolnshire County Council. ISBN 0-86111-126-5.**
