= West Mill =

West Mill is the name of a number of mills:

- West Mill, Billinghay, a windmill in Lincolnshire
- West Mill, Brighton, a windmill in East Sussex
- West Mill, Briston, a windmill in Norfolk
- West Mill, Findsbury Fields, Clerkenwell, a windmill in Middlesex
- West Mill, Corringham, a windmill in Lincolnshire
- West Mill, Great Chesterford, a windmill in Essex
- West Mill, Halstead, a windmill in Essex
- West Mill, Hardwick, a windmill in Norfolk
- West Mill, Hornsea, a windmill in the East Riding of Yorkshire
- West Mill, Keyingham, a windmill in the East Riding of Yorkshire
- West Mill, Kimberley, a windmill in Nottinghamshire
- West Mill, Pinchbeck, a windmill in Lincolnshire
- West Mill, Pulham St Mary, a windmill in Norfolk
- West Mill, Rettendon, a windmill in Essex
- West Mill, Smarden, a windmill in Kent
- West Mill, Southminster, a windmill in Essex
- West Mill, West Boldon, a Co Durham

== See also ==
- Westmill (disambiguation)
