= Kirkstone =

Kirkstone may refer to:

== Places ==
- Kirkstone Pass, in Cumbria
- Kirkstone House School, in Lincolnshire

== Fictional characters ==
- Kit Kirkstone, a character in Cue for Treason
- Mirian Kirkstone, a character in The River's End (film)

== Software ==
- Yocto Kirkstone, a version of the Yocto Linux Distribution

== See also ==
- Kirkston, a heritage-listed villa in Windsor, Queensland
