= Ingoldmells Mill, Addlethorpe =

Grade II listed tower mill at Addlethorpe, Lincolnshire, United Kingdom

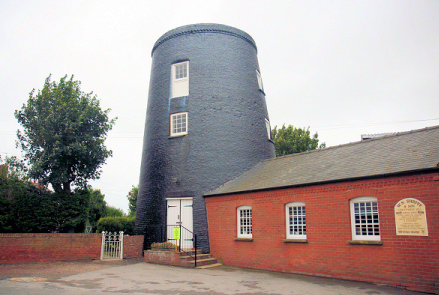
- Ingoldmells Mill, August 2006
- Interactive map of Ingoldmells Mill, Addlethorpe

Origin
- Mill name: Ingoldmells Mill
- Mill location: Addlethorpe, Lincolnshire, United Kingdom
- Grid reference: TF 551 675
- Coordinates: 53°10′57″N 0°19′12″E
- Year built: C.1830

Information
- Purpose: Corn mill
- Type: Tower mill
- Storeys: Six storeys
- No. of sails: Four
- Type of sails: Patent sails
- Windshaft: Cast iron
- Winding: Fantail
- Fantail blades: Eight
- Auxiliary power: Diesel engine
- No. of pairs of millstones: Three pairs
- Size of millstones: 4 feet 6 inches (1.37 m) diameter

Ingoldmells Mill is a Grade II listed tower mill at Addlethorpe, Lincolnshire, United Kingdom. Built c. 1830, it worked by wind until 1944, and by engine into the 1960s. A truncated stump survives, converted to residential use.

== History ==
Ingoldmells Mill was built c., replacing an earlier post mill. The mill had a lean, which was never resolved during its working life. In 1882, two sails were made using a pitch pine log that had washed up on the coast. One sail only lasted ten years, the other remained on the mill until 1949. In the early 20th century, the miller and a local trencherman prayed for wind, as there had been none for three weeks. The next morning, the wind got up, and blew for five days and nights. The miller sent the trencherman a postcard with the message "Had enough wind, dakker it a little". (Note: i.e., let it up a bit) The mill worked by wind until 1944. The mill was then worked by a Blackstone engine. The sails were removed in 1949. A new engine was installed in 1960, but was replaced in 1962 due to problems with it. Milling ceased shorty afterwards. The cap was removed in 1968. In 1986, the lower part of the upright shaft and the great spur wheel remained. The then owner had plans to truncate the mill and remove the remaining machinery for re-use elsewhere. The engine was to be taken to Dobson's Mill, Burgh-le-Marsh for preservation. The tower stood to its full height in 1987. The mill was listed Grade II on 30 April 1987. A truncated stump survives, converted to residential accommodation.

== Description ==
Ingoldmells Mill was a six-storey tower mill with a stage at second floor level. It had four Patent sails, carried on a 9 inches (230 mm) square cast iron windshaft and mounted on a cross, which had a span of 8 feet 0 inches (2.44 m). One pair were double Patents and one pair were single Patents. The sails were originally 37 feet 0 inches (11.28 m) long. They were shortened in 1927 to 33 feet 4 inches (10.16 m). After shortening, all four sails had seven bays of three shutters. The mill was winded by an eight-bladed fantail. All machinery was of cast iron. The great spur wheel was cast in two halves. Three pairs of millstones were driven. Two pairs of French Burr stones and one pair of Peak stones. The mill drove a kibbler. The French Burr stones were 4 feet 6 inches (1.37 m) diameter.
