= Westmill (disambiguation) =

Westmill is an English village and civil parish in East Hertfordshire.

Westmill may also refer to one of the following places in England:

- Westmill, Hitchin, North Hertfordshire
- Westmill Solar Park, Oxfordshire
- Westmill Wind Farm, Oxfordshire

== See also ==
- West Mill (disambiguation)
