= Burgh Bypass =

Road in England

Coordinates: 53.1675°N 0.2471°E

A158
- Burgh Bypass
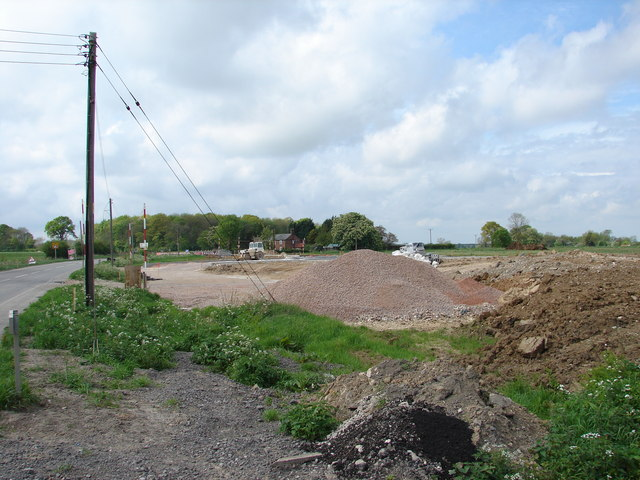
- Construction work on the west end of the bypass, in 2007

Route information
- History: Constructed September 2006 – November 2007

Major junctions
- From: Gunby, Lincolnshire
- Common Lane, Orby Road, A158 (Station Rd)
- To: Burgh Road, Burgh Le Marsh

Location
- Country: United Kingdom

Road network
- Roads in the United Kingdom; Motorways; A and B road zones

Burgh Bypass is a bypass of the town of Burgh Le Marsh near Skegness. It was passed in 2005 and construction began in September 2006 after a lengthy campaign from locals. The bypass is aiming to cut traffic dramatically by re-routing vehicles past the town and over the village of Orby coming out on Burgh Road, the main road to Skegness. The bypass was originally expected to be finished in Winter 2007/Spring 2008, on 26 July 2007 the roundabout on the bypass was opened and opening of the bypass took place on 13 October 2007. In early November half of the bypass was opened with limited access to Ingoldmells and Common Lane. The bypass fully opened to traffic on 30 November 2007.
