= Down Hall, Barrow upon Humber =

Building in Barrow upon Humber, Lincolnshire, England

Coordinates: 53.6822°N 0.3756°W

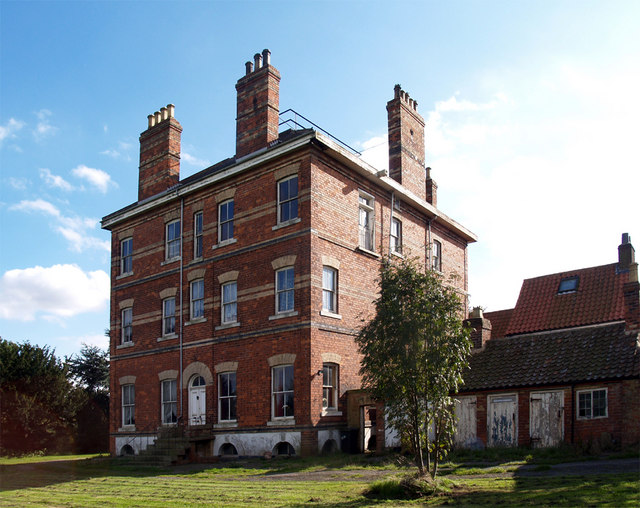
Down Hall

Down Hall is a large red brick merchant's folly in Barrow upon Humber in North Lincolnshire, England. Built in 1877 by JW Beeton, a willow merchant from Hull, the building originally served as both a grand house and a factory for the manufacture of coal baskets, chairs, and prams on its top floor and attic.

Beeton was an eccentric who paid his workers in distinctive octagonal tokens, and observed them cutting osiers from a panoramic view glass tower, (now removed,) on the roof of the building. It is alleged that he lined the drive to the hall with skulls removed from a Saxon burial ground which was disturbed during building.

Down Hall was built by John Sleight of Barrow, who said that the house was based on the calendar using the numbers seven, twenty-four, twelve, fifty-two and even three-hundred-and-sixty-five for numbers and measurements of doors, windows and other fittings. Sleight claimed that the effort of building a house to such eccentric specifications almost killed him.

Down Hall is under long term renovation trying to bring to bring it back to its former grandeur. However its custodians face more than just what an old building can throw at them. Photographs bel ow are only a few of what may envelop this historic building and local landscape.

Down hall is surrounded on four sides by Down Hall Farm.

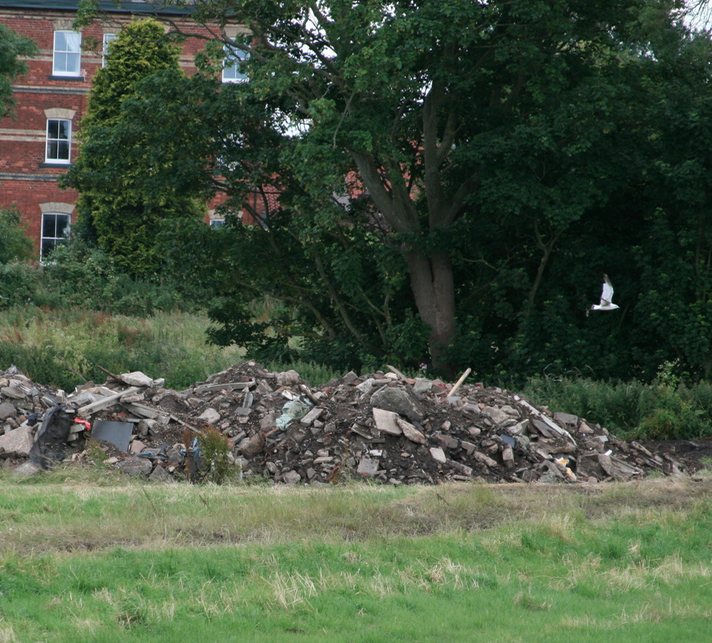
.

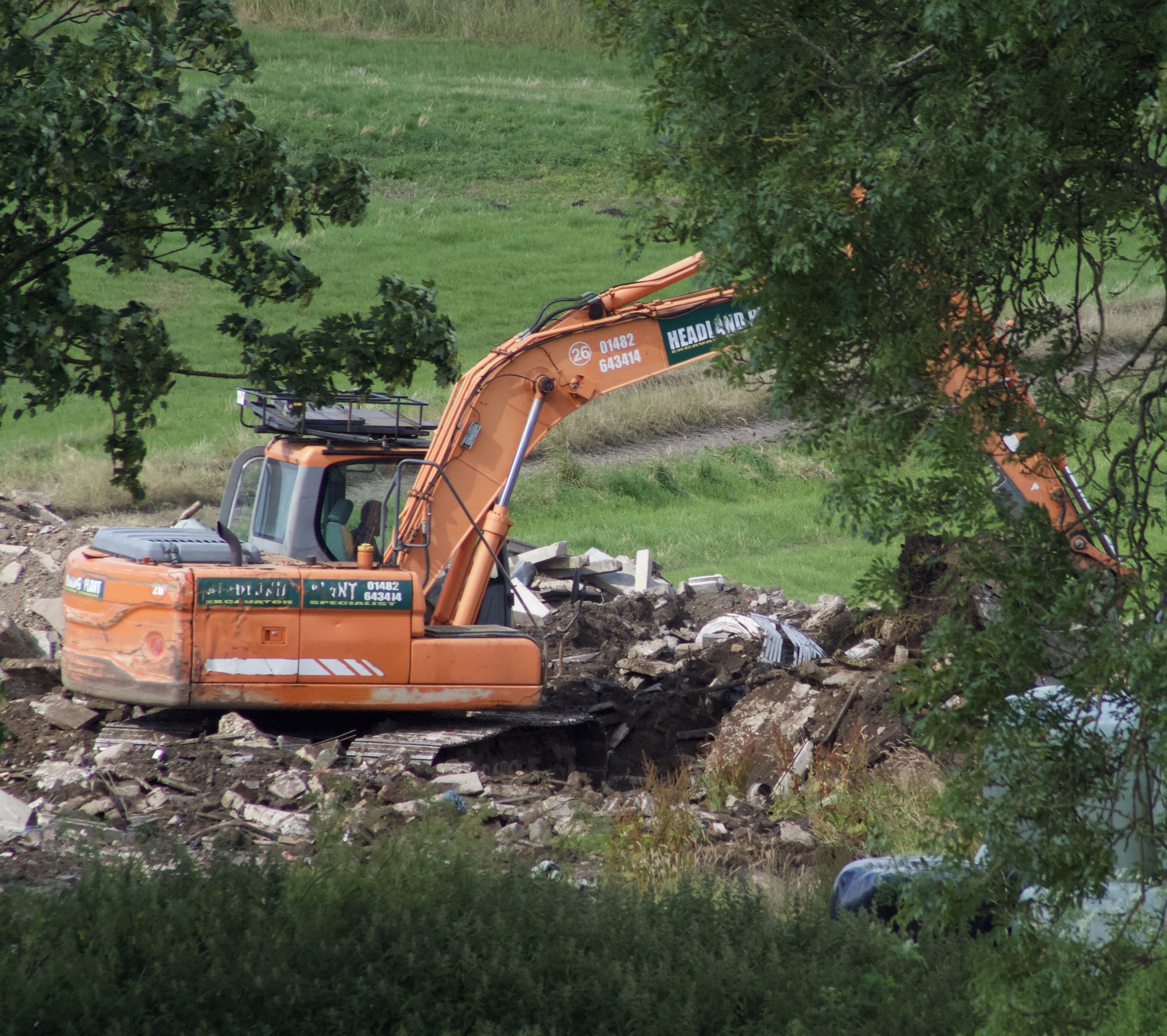
.

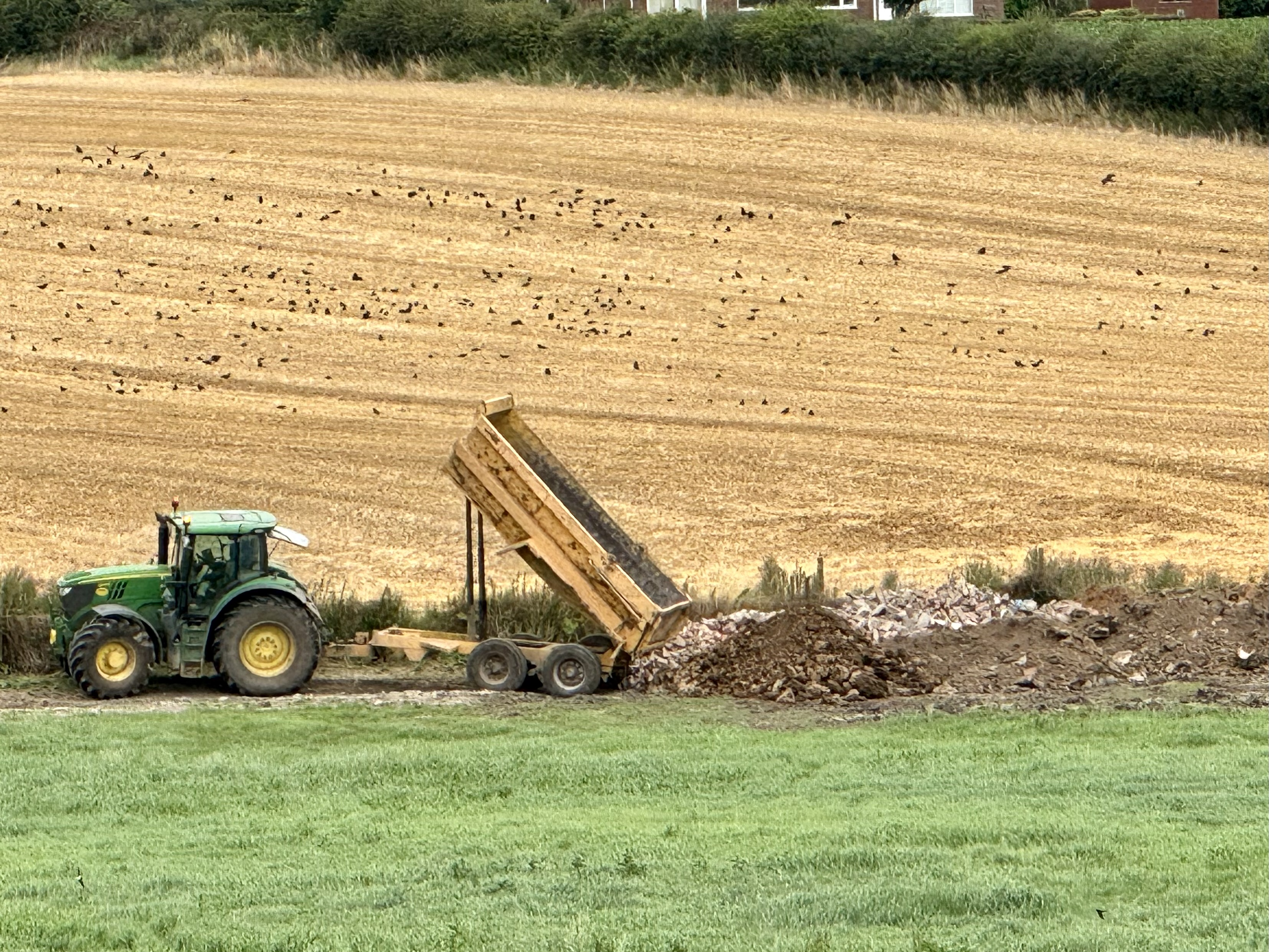

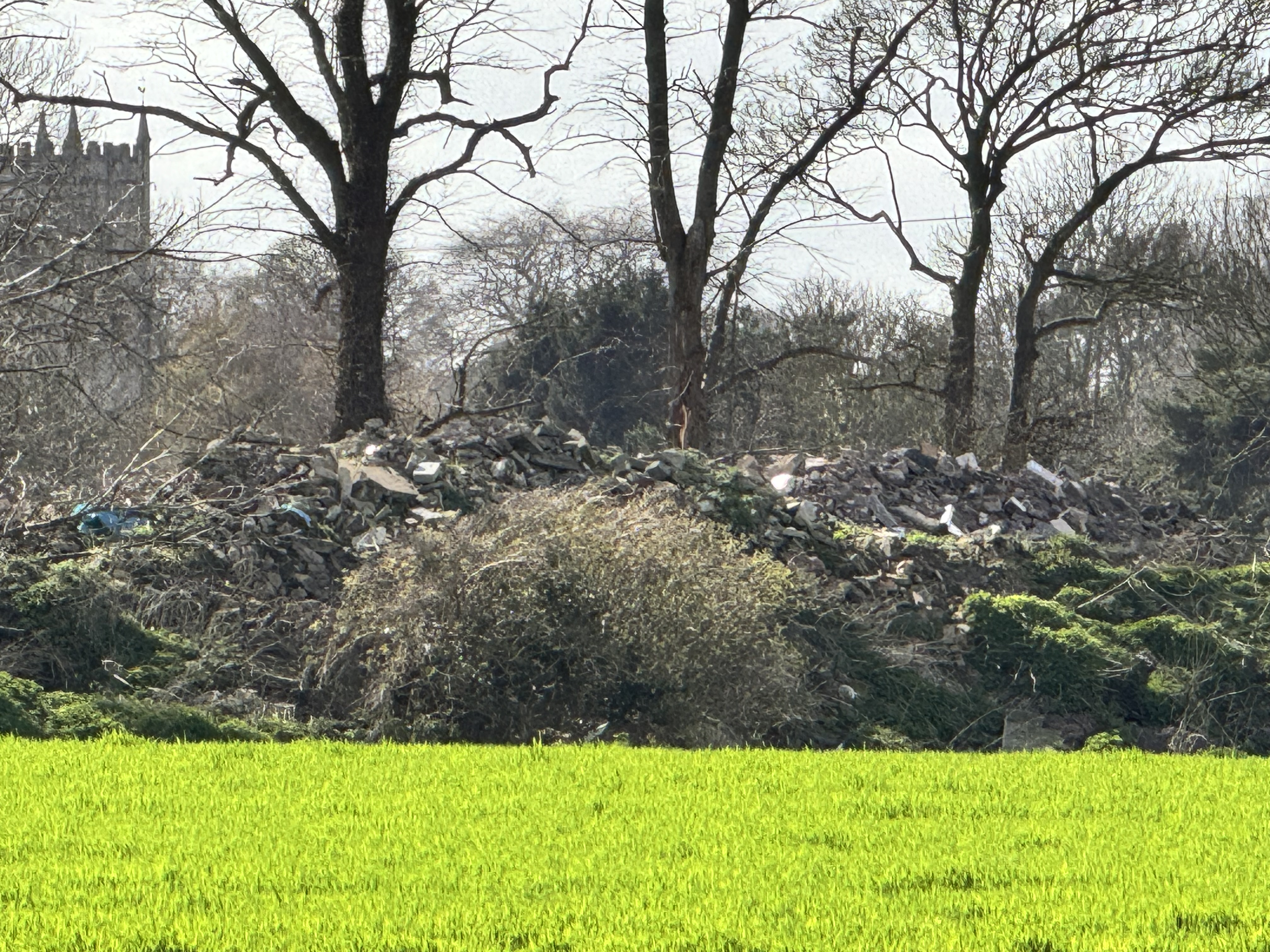
Down halls past grand avenue

Photo of Land upstream of Barrow Blow Wells, nature reserve from Down Hall.

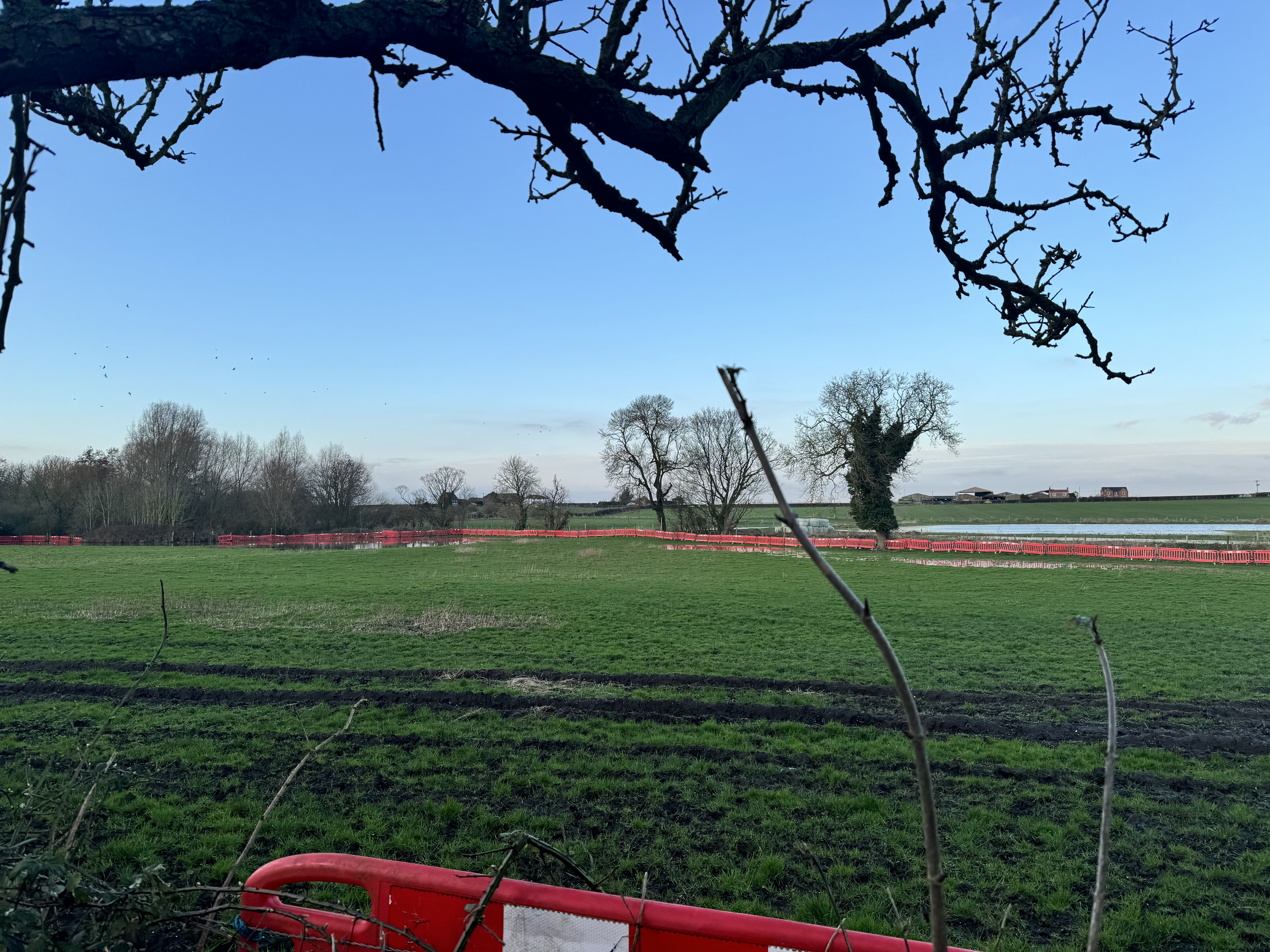
Barrier stopping wildlife transiting the nature reserve

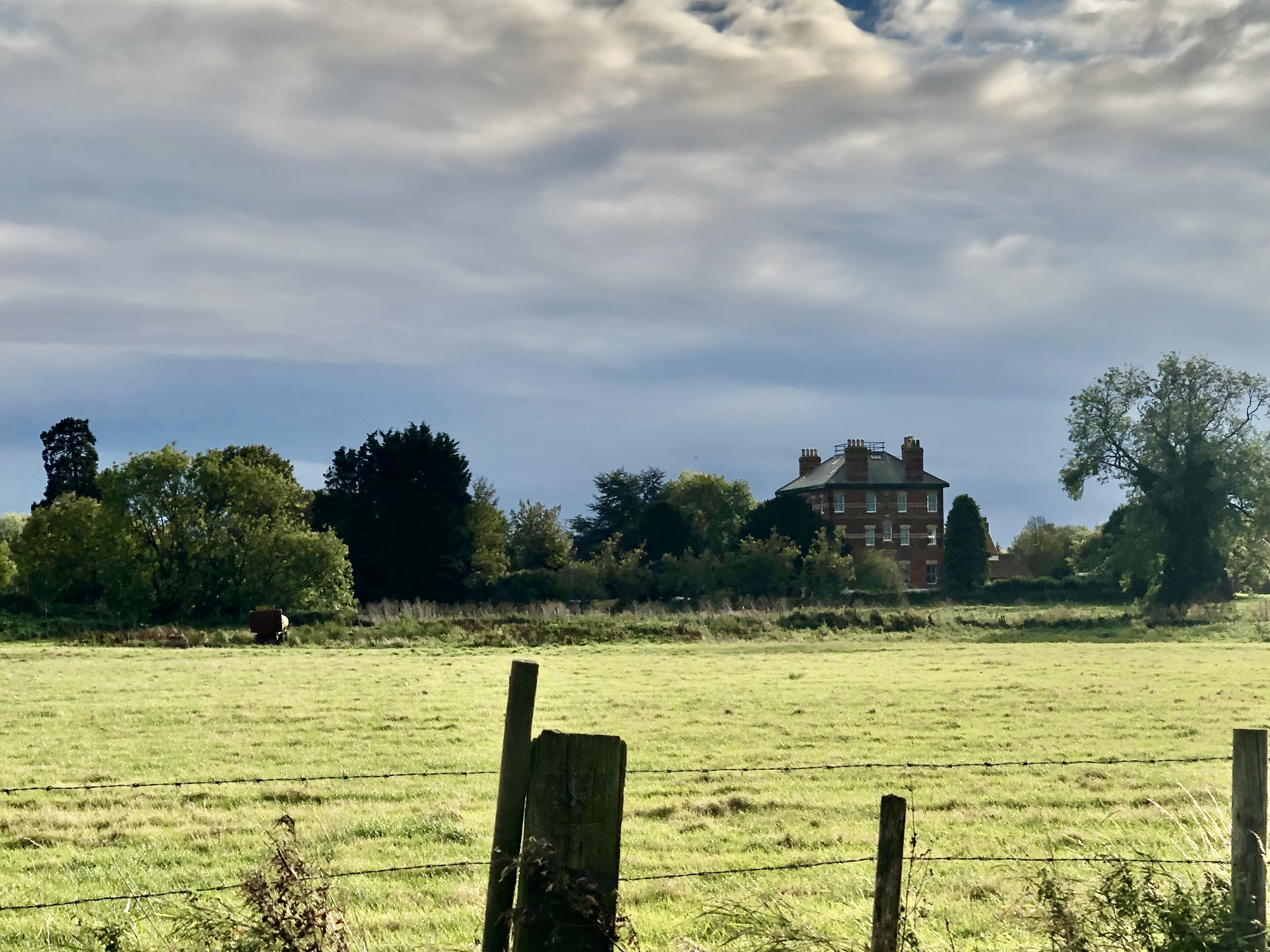
Before was all flat land

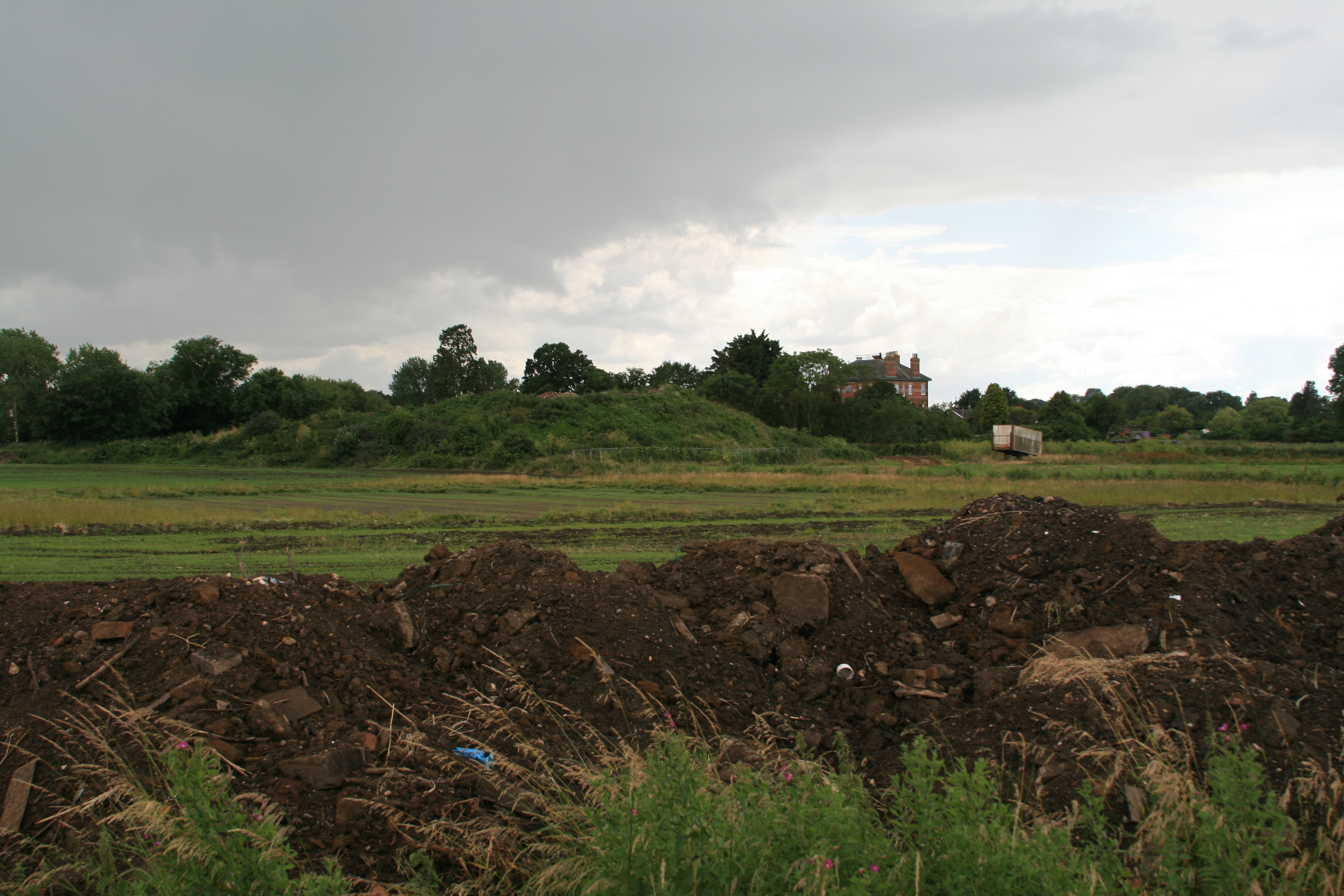
Huge pile / Bunds created

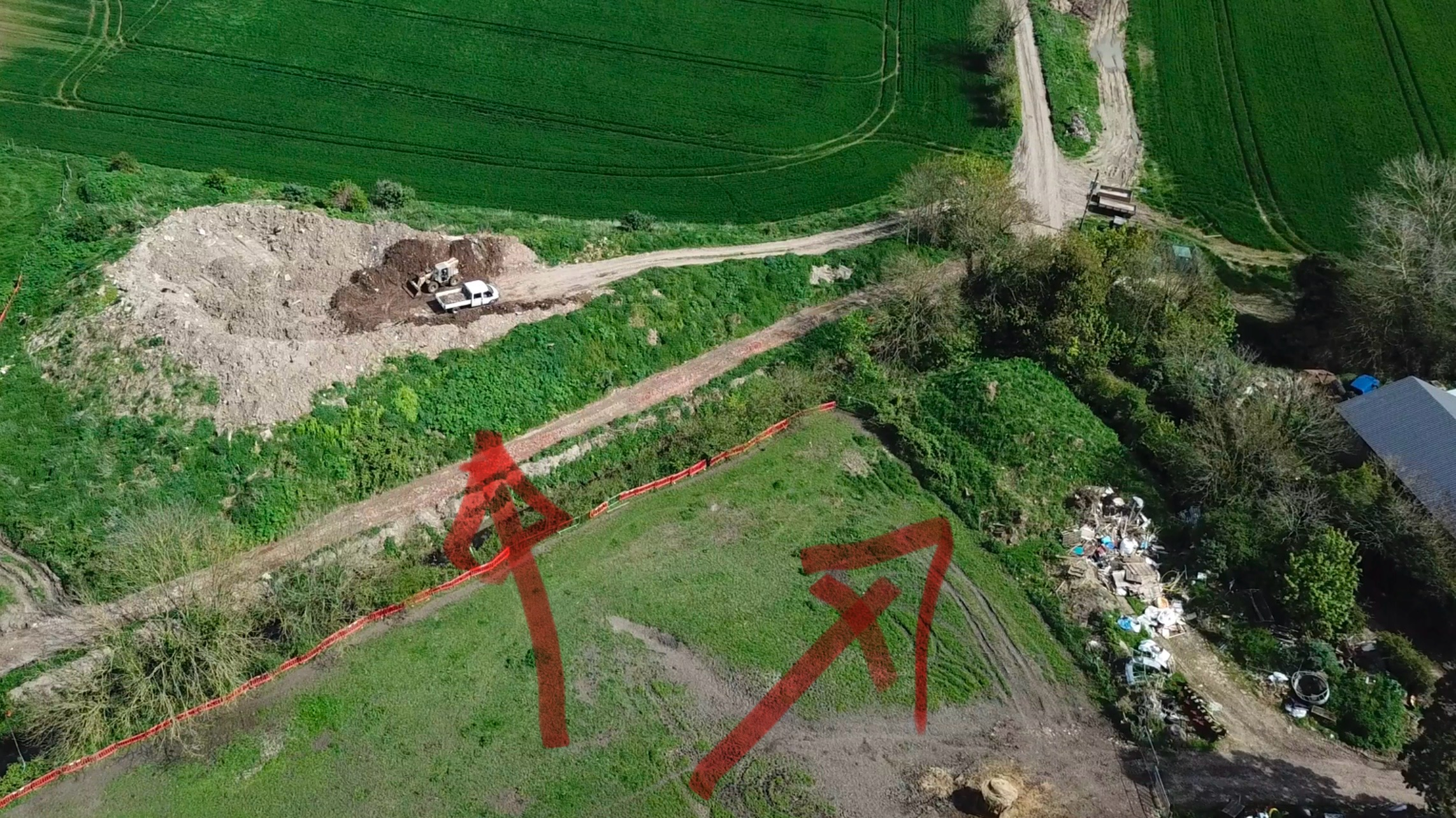
huge pile in the making… Factual photo see bottom left….

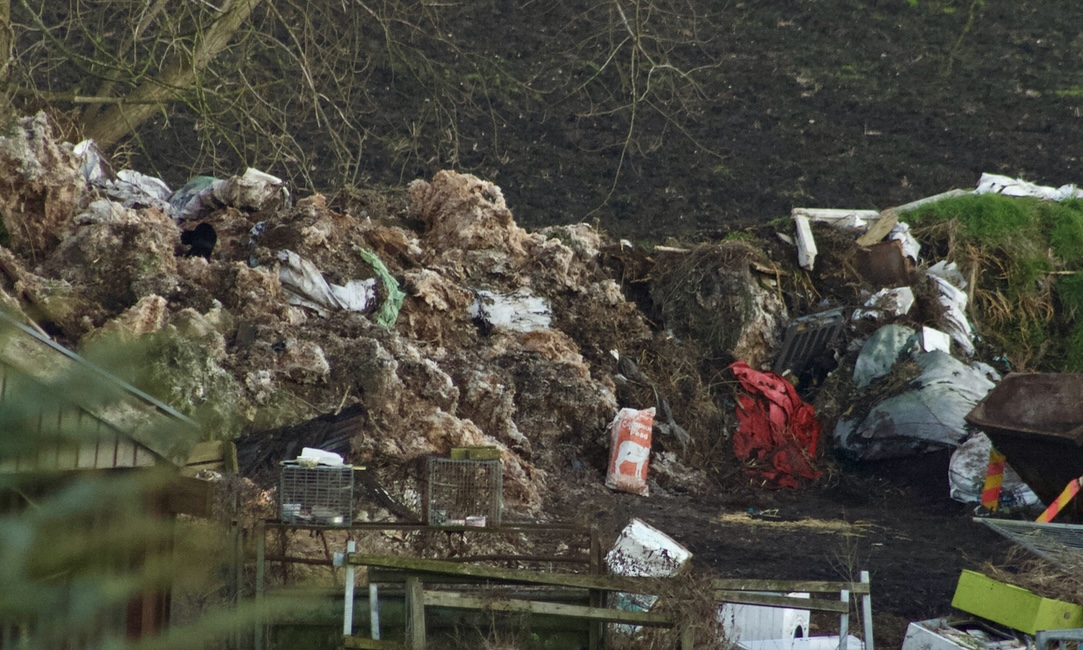
lagging…??

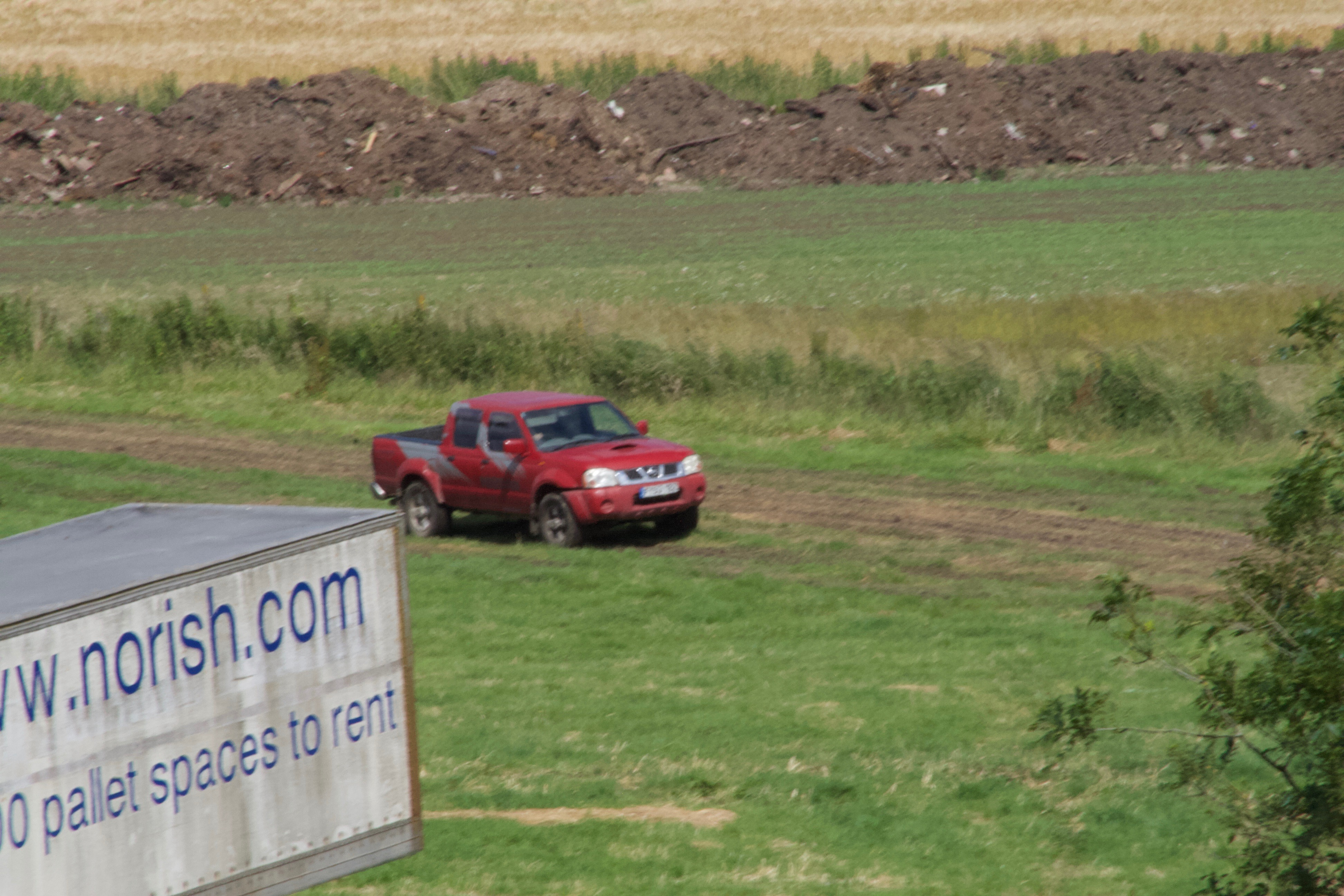
Photo view along the water course from Down Hall.

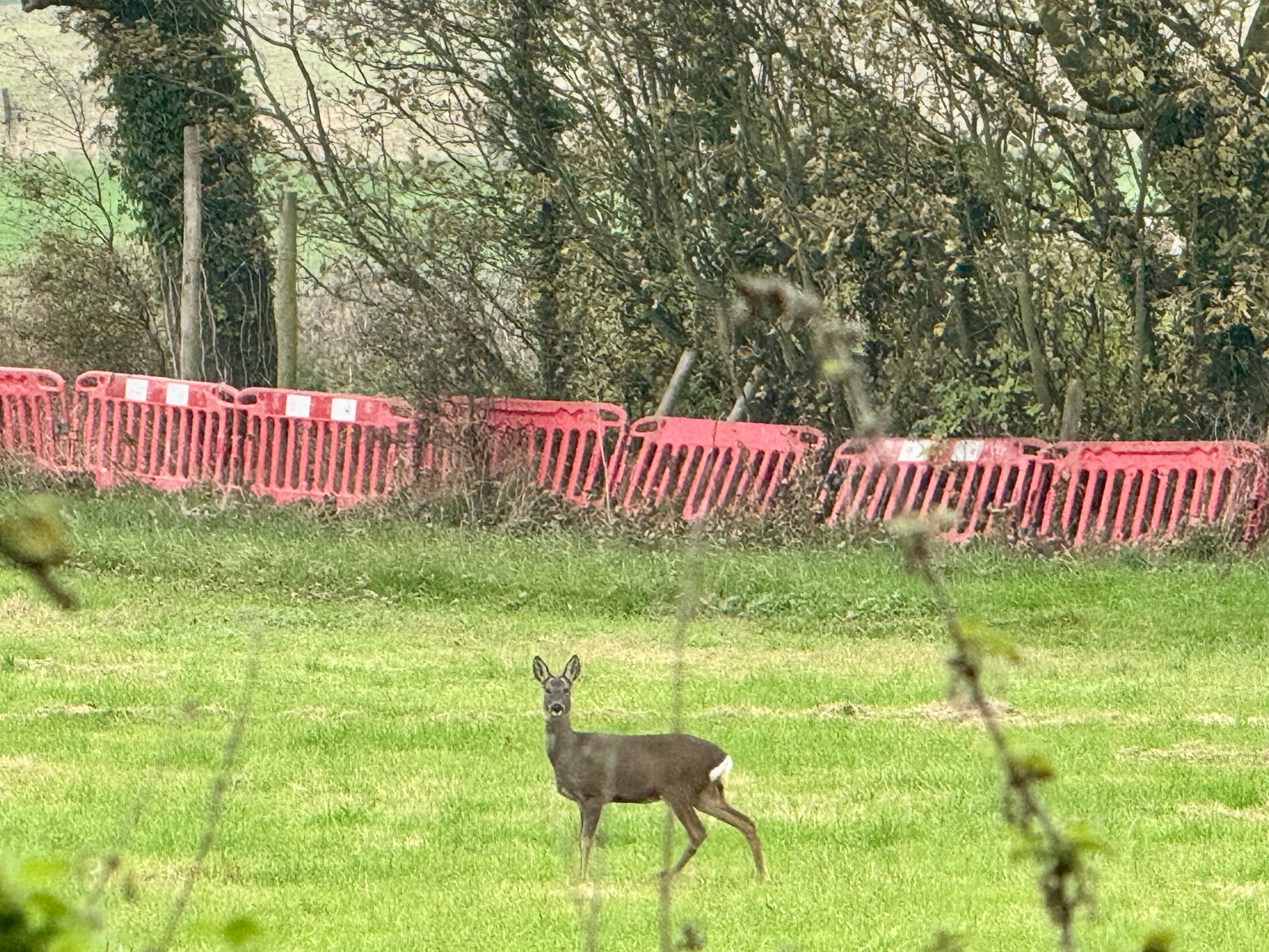
Wildlife trying to get to the nature reserve

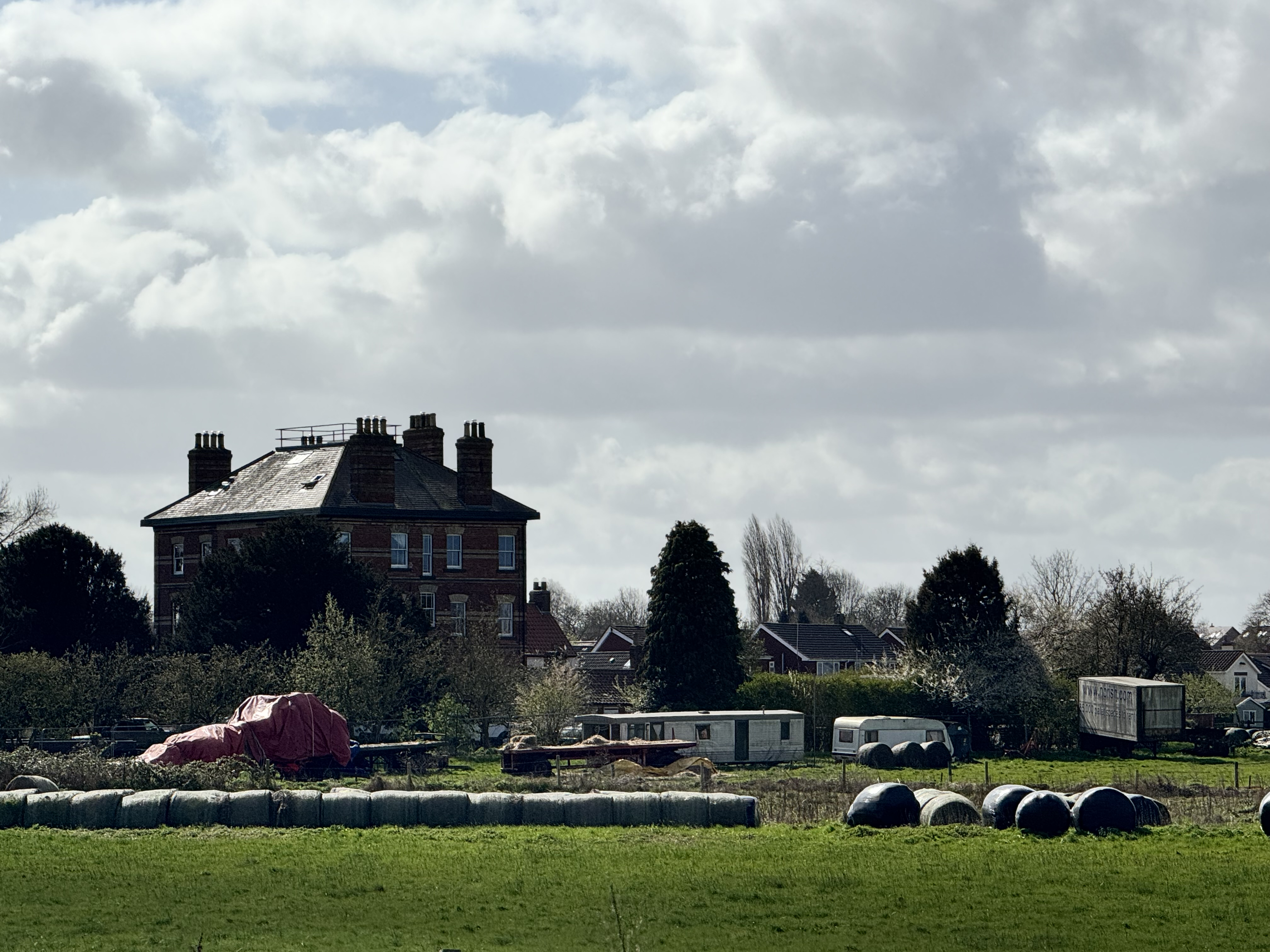
View of Down hall from the beck, Apr 2026

Genuine Photographs.
