= Metheringham =

English village in North Kesteven district, Lincolnshire

Coordinates: 53.1391°N 0.4034°W

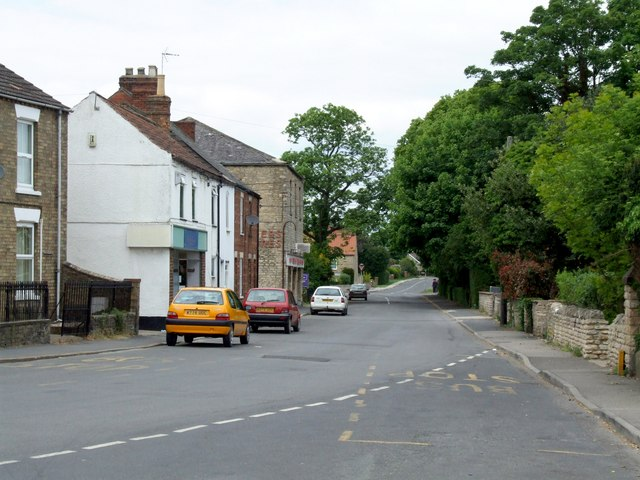
- Metheringham High Street

- Location within Lincolnshire
- Population: 3,605 (2011)
- OS grid reference: TF069615
  - London: 115 mi (185 km) S
- Civil parish: Metheringham
- District: North Kesteven
- Shire county: Lincolnshire
- Region: East Midlands
- Country: England
- Sovereign state: United Kingdom
- Post town: LINCOLN
- Postcode district: LN4
- Dialling code: 01526
- Police: Lincolnshire
- Fire: Lincolnshire
- Ambulance: East Midlands
- UK Parliament: Sleaford and North Hykeham

Metheringham is a village and civil parish in the North Kesteven district of Lincolnshire, England. The population of the civil parish at the 2011 census was 3,605. It is about 9 miles (14 km) south of Lincoln and 10 miles (16 km) north of Sleaford. The centre of the village is a conservation area.

== History ==
The village is a documented settlement in the Domesday Book of 1086, and is thought to date from Saxon times. It appears to be associated with the name "Medrich". The addition of the plural ending "-es" together with the familiar "-ham" ending is thought to have produced "Medrichesham" (the homestead of Medrich), which in time became corrupted into the modern name of the village. The earliest surviving document relating specifically to the village dates from 24 June 1314, in the reign of Edward II. In July 1599, a great fire left only a few houses standing. It started in a gully that ran the length of the village street.

White's 1842 Directory of Lincolnshire called Metheringham "a large improving village, on a gentle declivity, between Lincoln Heath and the Cardyke navigation, 9 miles S. E. of Lincoln. Its parish increased its population from 536 in 1801, to 880 in 1831, to 1197 in 1841, and contains 5682A[cres], 1R[ood], 32P[erches] of land." It also notes, "An ancient Cross, which stood in the village, was replaced by a new one in 1835, at the cost of about £25, and a market is now held round it on Saturday evenings. The drainage of the parish is aided by a steam engine of 25-horse power, and has dried an ancient spring called Holywell." It describes the church (see below) and adds, "Here is a Wesleyan Chapel, erected in 1840. A School was established by subscription in 1841, and there is a flourishing Sick Club, and also a Cow Club. The poor parishioners have 3R.37P. of land left by one Colley; and an annuity of £3, left by John Ellis in 1829."

The village war memorial records the names of 42 men who died for their country in the First World War and eight who fell in the Second World War.

=== Notable person ===
The village was the birthplace of H. F. Ellis (1907–2000), a writer who developed the comic schoolmaster character A. J. Wentworth B. A. in the magazine Punch and later in The New Yorker.

== Geography ==
Metheringham lies 3 miles (4.8 km) east of the Lincoln Cliff escarpment, on the western edge of fenland extending south-east towards Boston and The Wash. It lies on the north–south B1188 between Ruskington and Branston, and on the east–west B1202 and B1189 roads. Dunston is 1 mile (1.6 km) to the north, and Scopwick and Blankney are to the south. The railway station is in Station Road (B1189). The centre of the village is a conservation area. To the west and the A15 is Metheringham Heath, on which is a SSSI at a local quarry.

=== Metheringham Fen, Sots Hole and Tanvats ===
To the east is Metheringham Fen, across which lies Metheringham Delph that drains into the River Witham from where it connects to the Car Dyke near an old wartime airfield. The Metheringham Delph was recommended for designation as a local wildlife area in 2010. The area has historically been a centre for potato cultivation, and agricultural workers lived at two hamlets on the fen, Tanvats and Sots Hole. Their needs were served by two schools, a church, a shop and a public house. All were gone by the 1980s, as agricultural mechanisation saw a decline in employment.

== Community ==
Metheringham is known to locals as "Meg". The population of the built-up area was estimated at 3,595 in 2018.

The parish church of St Wilfrid belongs to the Metheringham group with Blankney and Dunston. There is a Methodist church, built in 1907 by the architect Albert Edward Lambert. San Damiano House is one of five houses in England of the Community of St. Francis, a Franciscan Anglican religious order for women.

The village has a primary school, a High Street café, a Co-op store, and a traditional butcher's shop, which has been trading for over 80 years. It has four pubs: the Star & Garter in Prince's Street, the White Hart Inn, the Lincolnshire Poacher in High Street, and the Londesborough Arms.

Metheringham is served by an hourly daytime, Monday-to-Saturday bus between Boston and Lincoln, provided by Brylaine. This runs less frequently on Sundays. Other services run to South Kyme (P. C. Coaches) and to Sleaford (Road Car). There are regular direct Monday-to-Saturday train services to Lincoln, Doncaster, Sleaford, Spalding, Peterborough, and Leicester.

== See also ==
- Metheringham railway station
- Spring line settlements
- Metheringham Windmill
- RAF Metheringham
