= Hewson's Mill, Barton-upon-Humber =

Building in Barton-upon-Humber, North Lincolnshire, England, UK

- Hewson's Mill, February 2008
- Interactive map of Hewson's Mill, Barton-upon-Humber

Origin
- Mill name: Hewson's Mill
- Mill location: Barton-upon-Humber, Lincolnshire, United Kingdom
- Grid reference: TA 0276 2264
- Coordinates: 53°41′26″N 0°26′42″W
- Year built: 1813

Information
- Purpose: Corn mill
- Type: Tower mill
- Storeys: Seven storeys
- No. of sails: Four
- Type of sails: Patent sails
- Windshaft: Cast iron
- Winding: Fantail
- Auxiliary power: Steam engine
- No. of pairs of millstones: Four pairs

Hewson's Mill is a Grade II listed tower mill in Barton-upon-Humber, Lincolnshire, United Kingdom. Built in 1813, it worked by wind until the First World War and then by engine into the 1920s. The mill has been converted to residential accommodation.

== History ==
Hewson's Mill was built in 1813 for Messrs. Sutton & Cook. It was fitted with their Patent Gravitated Sails. These had longitudinal shutters. Sutton & Cook became bankrupt in 1816 and the mill was offered for sale. By 1848, a steam engine had been installed as auxiliary power. The Hewson family ran the mill from the late 1840s. It worked by wind until the First World War and then by engine into the 1920s.

The mill was derelict by 1923. It retained its cap in 1928, missing most of its weatherboards. The cap had gone by February 1932, when the mill was sketched by Gainsborough artist Karl Wood. The cap frame remained. The mill was listed Grade II on 17 September 1976. In October 2021, planning permission was granted to convert the mill to residential accommodation.

== Description ==
Hewson's Mill is an seven-storey tower mill. The tower is about 60 feet (18 m) tall. It is 26 feet 0 inches (7.92 m) diameter internally at the base and 12 feet 0 inches (3.66 m) diameter internally at the top. It had a stage at fourth floor level. The mill had an ogee cap winded by a fantail. Originally fitted with Sutton & Cook's Patent Gravitated sails, the were later replaced by Cubitt's double Patent sails, which had seven bays of three shutters. The mill drove four pairs of millstones. Three pairs were French Burr stones and one pair was Peak stones. The mill also drove two flour dressers and a corn screen.
