= Dobson's Mill =

Windmill in Burgh le Marsh, Lincolnshire, England

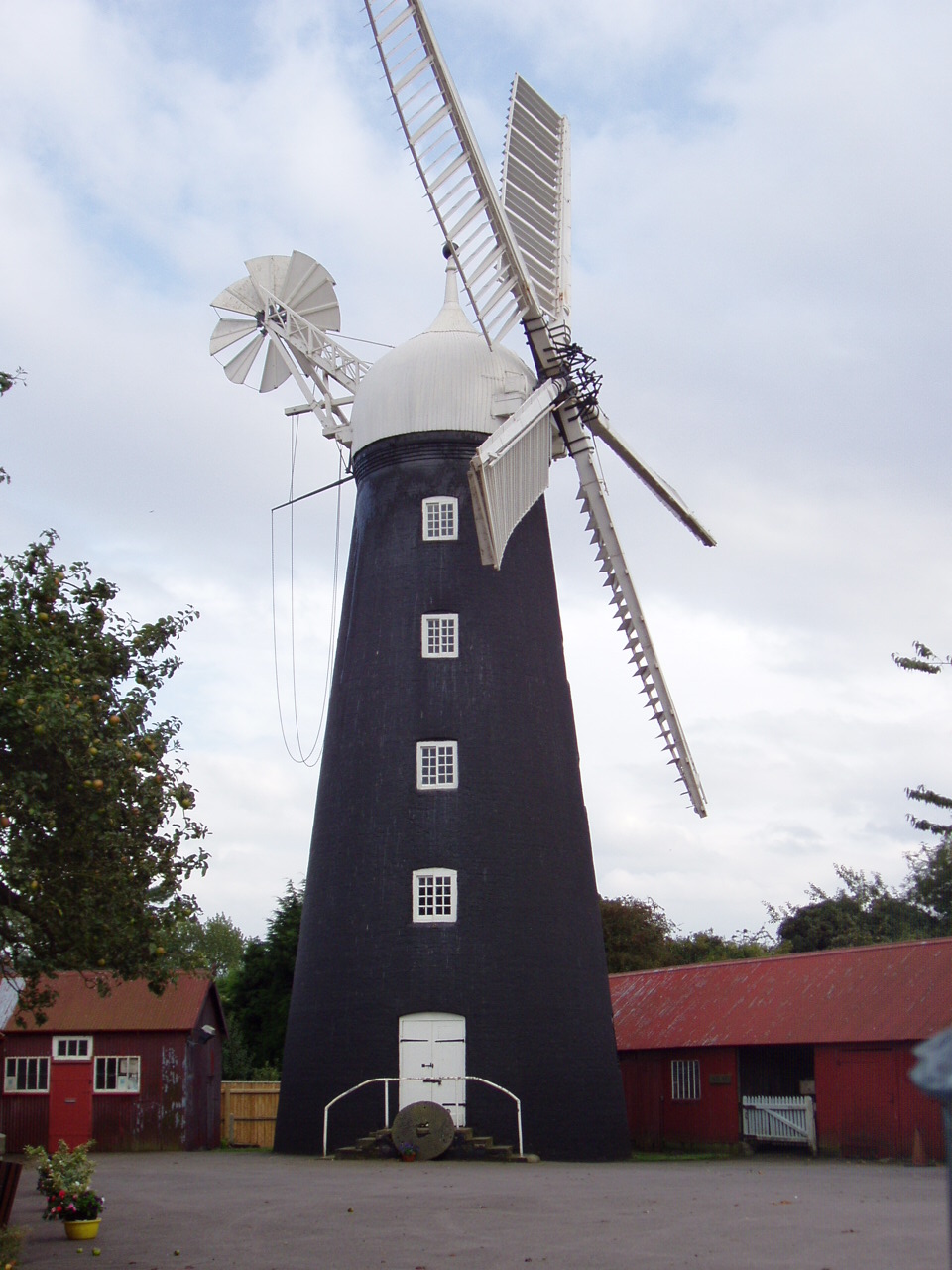
- Dobson's Mill, 2007
- Interactive map of Dobson's Mill

Origin
- Mill name: Dobson's Mill
- Mill location: Burgh le Marsh, Lincolnshire, United Kingdom
- Grid reference: TF 5037 6497
- Coordinates: 53°09′38″N 0°14′52″E
- Operator: Lincolnshire County Council
- Year built: 1833

Information
- Purpose: Flour mill
- Type: Tower mill
- Storeys: Five storeys
- No. of sails: Five
- Type of sails: Patent sails
- Windshaft: Cast iron
- Winding: Fantail
- Fantail blades: Eight
- Auxiliary power: Oil engine
- No. of pairs of millstones: Three pairs
- Other information

Listed Building – Grade I
- Designated: 28 May 1965
- Reference no.: 1222732
- Current Status: Visitor attraction, currently closed due to storm damage

Dobson's Mill is Grade I listed tower mill in Burgh le Marsh, Lincolnshire, United Kingdom. A corn mill built in 1813, it worked commercially until 1964. The mill was acquired by Lindsey County Council in 1965 and was open to the public as a tourist attraction. It was tailwinded during Storm Ciara on 9 February 2020, with the cap and sails being blown off. The mill site also houses the Burgh-le-Marsh Heritage Centre.

== History ==
Dobson's Mill was built in 1813 by Sam Oxley, millwright of Alford, Lincolnshire, who also build Alford Windmill in the same year. The mill was built for Agar Jessop. It had four sails when built, as shown on a map of 1819. The tower developed a lean at some point and had to be underpinned. C.1870, the mill was refitted with five Patent sails. The millstones were moved down a floor. Robert Barker took the mill c.1880. The mill remained in the Barker family until 1929, when it was purchased by Frank Dobson, a miller from Grebby. He formed E. Dobson & Son with his father, Edwin, concentrating the business at Burgh le Marsh. When Frank Dobson retired, the mill was taken by his son Edwin. As Edwin ran a baker's, he employed a miller. The last miller, George Bamber, retired in 1963 leaving Edwin to run the bakery and mill. He gave the business up in 1964 and the mill was sold.

The new owner did not intend to work the mill. Lindsey County Council started negotiation to buy the mill for preservation in February 1965. A building preservation order was placed on the mill. In July 1965, an agreement was made for the sale of the mill for £5,650. In 1966, the outbuildings were converted to form the Windmill Restaurant. The mill passed to Lincolnshire County Council in 1974 and was restored to working order in 1984. To replace the original diesel engine, which had been sold, the Blackstone engine from Ingoldmells Mill, Addlethorpe was subsequently installed. The mill was listed Grade I on 17 December 1987.

On 9 February 2020 the cap and sails were destroyed by winds from Storm Ciara. The 16-tonne sails landed on the adjacent Granary Heritage Displays, which were reopened in May 2023. In March 2024, it was announced that Lincolnshire County Council had applied for planning permission to restore the mill. It was hoped that the work would be completed by 2026.

== Description ==
As built, Dobson's Mill had four Common sails and there was a stage around the tower. The mill is a five storey tower mill. It had a ogee cap winded by an eight-bladed fantail. Five Patent sails were carried on a cast iron windshaft, mounted on a cross. the sails had eight bays of three shutters. They rotated in a clockwise direction. The windshaft carried a composite brake wheel, with a cast iron hub and wooden rim. This drove a cast iron wallower with wooden cogs at the top of the cast iron upright shaft. At the bottom of the upright shaft, a cast iron great spur wheel drives three pairs of millstones. Two pairs were Peak stones and one pair were French Burr stones. A diesel engine provided auxiliary power. The mill also drove a roller mill and a mixer.
