= Hudson's Mill, Baston =

Grade II listed tower mill at Baston, Lincolnshire

- Hudson's Mill, February 2014
- Interactive map of Hudson's Mill, Baston

Origin
- Mill name: Hudson's Mill
- Mill location: Baston, Lincolnshire, United Kingdom
- Grid reference: TG 1164 1316
- Coordinates: 52°42′16″N 0°20′57″W
- Year built: 1806

Information
- Purpose: Corn mill
- Type: Tower mill
- Storeys: Three storeys
- No. of sails: Four
- Type of sails: Patent sails
- No. of pairs of millstones: Two pairs

Hudson's Mill is a Grade II listed tower mill at Baston, Lincolnshire, United Kingdom. A corn mill built in 1806, it worked until the First World War. The derelict empty tower survives.

== History ==
Hudson's Mill was built in 1806. It was working until the First World War and was subsequently dismantled. The machinery may have been reused in another mill. The mill was derelict by 1923. Gainsborough artist Karl Wood sketched the mill on 1 June 1933. The mill was then devoid of its cap and sails. The mill was listed Grade II on 22 June 1987.

== Description ==
Hudson's Mill is a three-storey tower mill. It had four Patent sails and drove two pairs of millstones.
