= Baston =

Village and civil parish in Lincolnshire, England

Coordinates: 52.713°N 0.352°W

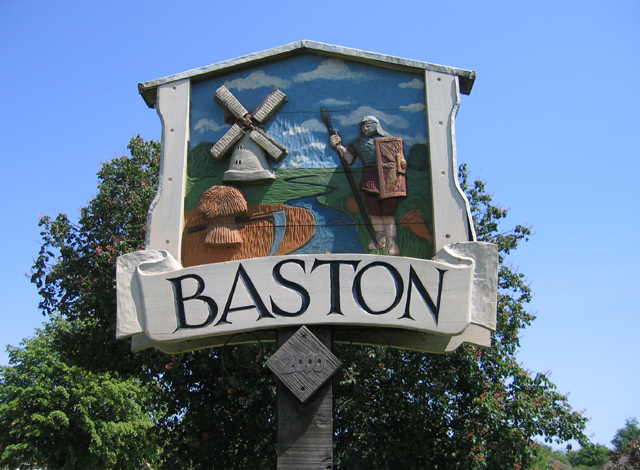
- Village sign in Baston, showing Hudson's Mill.

- Location within Lincolnshire
- Population: 1,469 (2011 census)
- OS grid reference: TF114140
  - London: 80 mi (130 km) S
- District: South Kesteven
- Shire county: Lincolnshire
- Region: East Midlands
- Country: England
- Sovereign state: United Kingdom
- Post town: PETERBOROUGH
- Postcode district: PE6
- Dialling code: 01778
- Police: Lincolnshire
- Fire: Lincolnshire
- Ambulance: East Midlands

Baston is a village and parish on the edge of The Fens and in the administrative district of South Kesteven, Lincolnshire, England. The 2011 census reported the parish had 1,469 people in 555 households.

Like most fen-edge parishes, it was laid out more than a thousand years ago, in an elongated form, to afford the produce from a variety of habitats for the villagers. The village itself lies along the road between King Street, a road built in the second century, and Baston Fen which is on the margin of the much bigger Deeping Fen. Until the nineteenth century, the heart of Deeping Fen was a common fen on which all the surrounding villages had rights of turbary, fowling and pasture.

== History ==
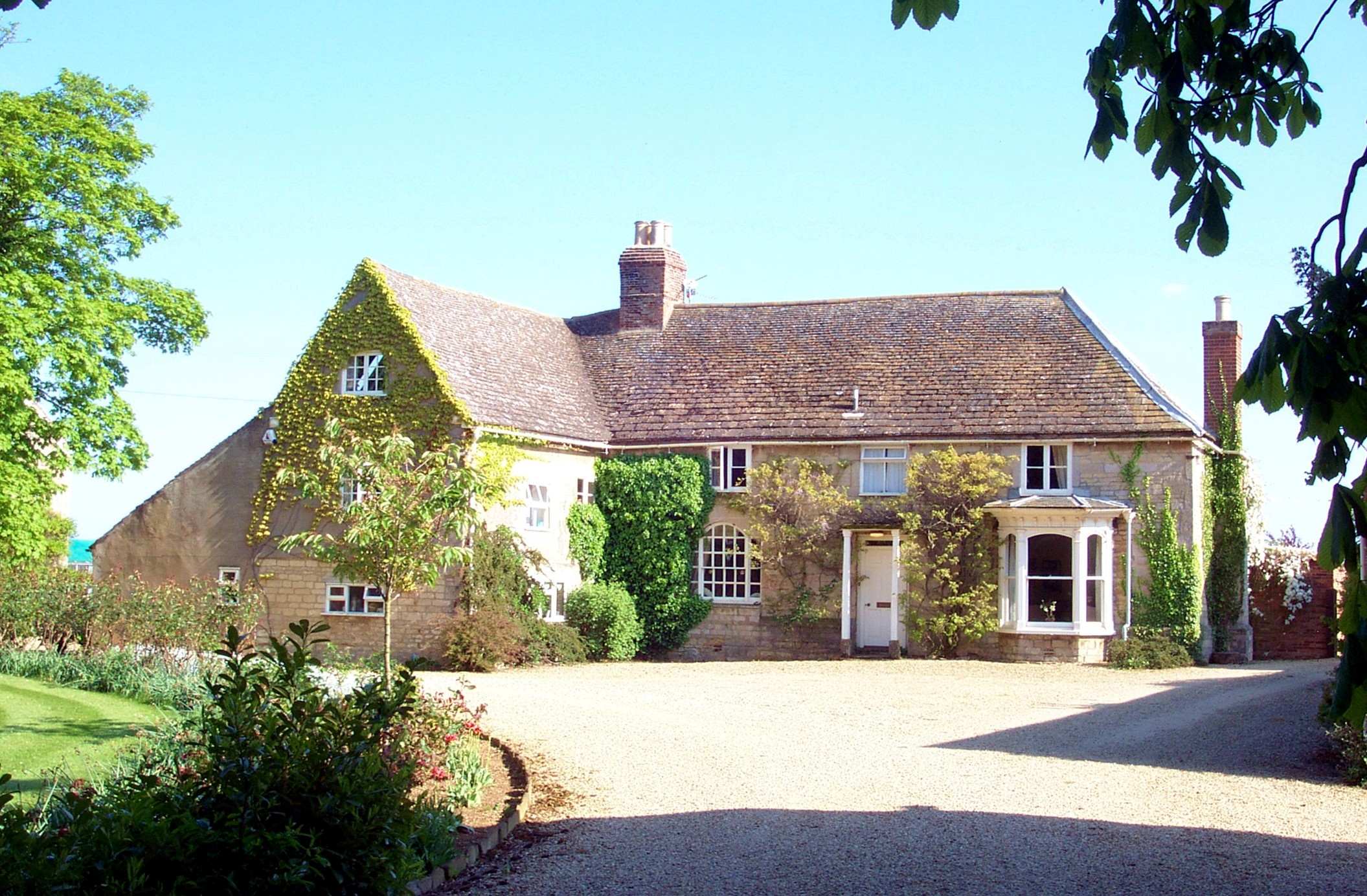
Baston Manor House, a 16th century manor house in the village

A significant Roman feature of Baston is the Roman road leading across the fen towards Spalding. Part of the modern fen road follows it.

At the end of the village, near King Street, was an Anglian cemetery which was in use up to about the year 500. This coincides approximately with the date of the beginning of King Arthur's exploits, as reported by the Historia Brittonum, when Arthur fought his first battle at the mouth of the River Glen and stopped the spread of Anglo-Saxon settlement for fifty years. The Anglo-Saxon cemetery, of funerary urns, was found by Rev. Edward Trollope in 1851. He found around 10 burials in 1863 and traces of another 16 were found in 1963

Baston Manor House is a 16th-century structure which was altered and extended in the 17th, late 18th, late 19th and early 20th centuries. The manor house has been Grade II listed since 1952. Also listed are the Manor House's two sets of 18th-century stables, one to the east (now a garage) and another to the west which is listed along with a granary. In the 19th century the Manor House was owned by Robert Marriott a noted horse-breeder who won many prizes at local agricultural shows, he lived there until 1876. The house was later bought by Francis Knipe in 1888 when he had 120 bullocks and 600 sheep. Over 300 blue rock pigeons were kept in the dovecote at the Manor House in past times, and were released for sport in the days before clay pigeon shooting.

Like most places in Europe, Baston suffered from the plague. Some Baston plague victims are shown in burial lists. A possible plague burial was uncovered during the building of a corn dryer.

The 'Baston Pig' was a name for the Lincolnshire Curly Coat pig.

== Governance ==
Baston is served by a Parish Council, two District Councillors who represent Casewick Ward on South Kesteven District Council and a County Councillor representing Deepings West & Rural Division on Lincolnshire County Council. The current District Councillors elected in May 2023 are Vanessa Smith (Green) and Rosemary Trollope-Bellew (Con). The Lincolnshire County Councillor elected in 2021 is Ashley John Baxter (Ind).

== Geography ==
Geographically, in the fen, the parish's northern boundary lies on the River Glen, beyond which is Thurlby. To the south is Langtoft and beyond King Street in the west is Greatford.

=== Geology ===
The parish lies on a fan of gravel from the Devensian glacial period, which spreads from the upland mouth of the valley of the River Welland, to the east of Stamford, Lincolnshire. There are two main forms of business in the parish: arable farming and gravel extraction. The flooded gravel pits subsequently lend themselves to development for leisure pursuits such as angling, birdwatching and watersports. The gravel was washed down from the tundra environment to the west and deposited in the periglacial lake, known as Lake Fenland, below the icy waters of which the site of Baston then lay.

== Education ==
Independent special school Kirkstone House School has been in the village since 1964.

Baston CE Primary School was opened in the village in July 1993.

== Sport ==
In 2002, a group of local residents decided that the village needed an area where a range of sports could be conducted. The cost of a sports hall was thought to be prohibitive, so the project was focused on a multi-use sports and skateboarding area. Following a village-wide survey, which had a 37% return rate, a public meeting was held in June 2002. As a result of both the survey and public meeting, it was decided that there was a mandate from the village to progress the project. Consequently, B-Active was formed as a sub-committee of the BPFMC.

As part of this the Baston Football Club was formed in 2005, and joined the Grantham & District Saturday Afternoon League. The club runs two adult teams playing in the Peterborough & District League on a Saturday afternoon. It plays its home games at Brudenell Playing Field in Baston, and is sponsored by local businesses. Baston cricket club plays in the south Lincs Division 1 league. The club won promotion last year by winning the division 2 title. Off the playing field the cricket club is advancing at a rapid pace. Last year saw the club purchase covers, and new this season is a pair of sight screens built from scratch and kindly donated by club member 'Big' Dave Ford. There are tennis courts for year-round use.

Both sports field and village hall are managed by the Brudenell Playing Fields Management Committee.

== See also ==
- Baston Lodge, a villa in St Leonards-on-Sea, England
