= Pearson's Mill =

Tower mill in Barrow upon Humber, Lincolnshire

Pearson's Mill, Barrow upon Humber
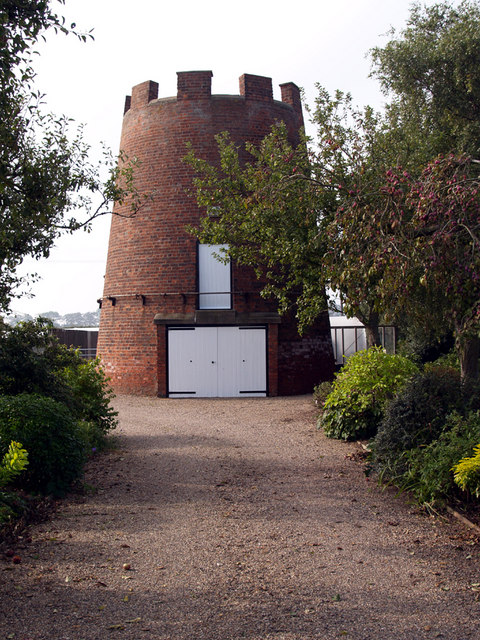
- Pearson's Mill, September 2006
- Interactive map of Pearson's Mill, Barrow upon Humber

Origin
- Mill name: Pearson's Mill
- Mill location: Barrow upon Humber, Lincolnshire, United Kingdom
- Grid reference: TA 059 215
- Coordinates: 53°40′47″N 0°23′49″W
- Year built: 1869

Information
- Purpose: Corn mill
- Type: Tower mill
- Storeys: Four storeys
- No. of sails: Four
- Type of sails: Patent sails
- Windshaft: Cast iron
- Winding: Fantail
- Fantail blades: Eight

Pearson's Mill is a tower mill in Barrow upon Humber, Lincolnshire, United Kingdom. Built in 1869, it was working in 1923. A two-storey stump remains, used as a garage and store.

== History ==
Pearson's Mill was built in 1869. The mill was working in 1923. The mill was standing in 1934, but had lost its sails and fantail. A two-storey stump remains, used as a garage and store.

== Description ==
Pearson's Mill was a four-storey tower mill with an ogee cap winded by an eight-bladed fantail. It had four singe Patent sails, carried on a cast iron windshaft and mounted on a cross. The sails had eight bays of three shutters.
