= Haven Mill, Barrow upon Humber =

Tower mill at Barrow upon Humber, Lincolnshire

- Haven Mill, January 2015
- Interactive map of Haven Mill, Barrow upon Humber

Origin
- Mill name: Haven Mill
- Mill location: Barrow upon Humber, Lincolnshire, United Kingdom
- Grid reference: TA 0626 2289
- Coordinates: 53°41′30″N 0°23′32″W
- Year built: 1816

Information
- Purpose: Sawmill, later corn mill
- Type: Tower mill
- Storeys: Six storeys
- No. of sails: Four
- Type of sails: Patent sails
- Windshaft: Cast iron
- Winding: Fantail
- No. of pairs of millstones: Three pairs

Haven Mill is a tower mill at Barrow upon Humber, Lincolnshire, United Kingdom. A four-storey stump of the six storey tower remains, converted to residential accommodation.

== History ==
Haven Mill was built in 1816. It was then a sawmill. The mill was six storeys tall. The mill was out of use by the First World War. It had lost its cap and sails and been reduced in height by two storeys by July 1934. The mill was an empty shell by 1953. It had been converted to residential accommodation by January 2015 (per infobox image).

== Description ==
Haven Mill is a tower mill which had six storeys. It had an ogee cap which was winded by a fantail. Four single Patent sails were carried on a cast iron windshaft and mounted on a cross. The sails had eight bays of three shutters. The mill drove three pairs of millstones. Two pairs were French Burr stones and one pair were Peak stones.
