= Bilsby Windmill =

Windmill in Bilsby, Lincolnshire, England

- Bilsby Mill, October 2020
- Interactive map of Bilsby Windmill

Origin
- Mill name: Bilsby Mill
- Mill location: Bilsby, Lincolnshire, United Kingdom
- Grid reference: TF 4698 7660
- Coordinates: 53°15′58″N 0°12′09″E
- Year built: 1861

Information
- Purpose: Corn mill
- Type: Tower mill
- Storeys: Four storeys
- No. of sails: Four
- Type of sails: Patent sails
- Windshaft: Cast iron
- Winding: Originally wheel and chain, later a fantail
- Fantail blades: Eight
- Auxiliary power: Diesel engine
- No. of pairs of millstones: Three pairs

Bilsby Windmill is a Grade II listed tower mill at Bilsby, Lincolnshire, United Kingdom. A corn mill built in 1861, it was raised a storey in the late 19th century. It worked by wind until 1932, then by engine for many years. The conserved tower stands, retaining some machinery.

== History ==
Bilsby Windmill was built in 1861, replacing an earlier post mill. The mill was originally three storeys tall and was winded by a wheel and chain. It was later raised by a storey. The mill was working on four sails in 1928, by was down to two sails in 1929. Milling by wind ceased in 1932. The mill had lost its sails and fantail by 1950. It was still working by engine in 1953, with a cessation date of 1972 claimed.

The cap had been removed by 1973. The mill was listed Grade II on 30 June 1986. The mill's tower was refurbished in 2015, with a new flat roof being fitted. Some machinery is thought to remain in the mill.

== Description ==
Bilsby Windmill is a four-storey tower mill. It had an ogee cap, winded by an eight-bladed fantail. Four Patent sails were carried on a cast iron windshaft, mounted on a cross. The sails had seven bays of shutters, six bays of three with the innermost bay havig two shutters. The mill drove three pairs of millstones, two of which were Peak stones. A Blackstone diesel engine provided auxiliary power.
