= Barrow upon Humber =

Village and civil parish in North Lincolnshire, England

Coordinates: 53.676°N 0.381°W

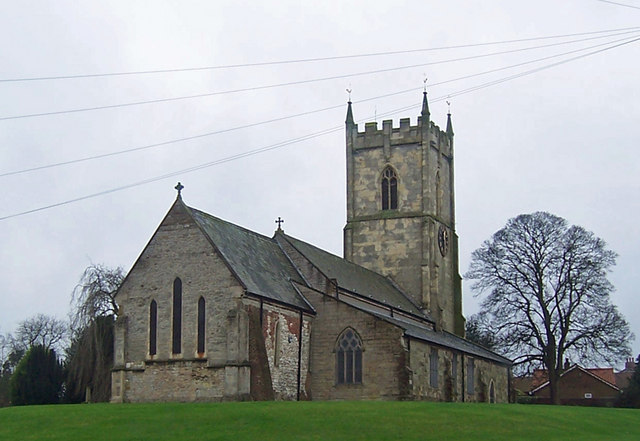
- Holy Trinity Church, Barrow upon Humber

- Location within Lincolnshire
- Population: 3,022 (2011)
- OS grid reference: TA069210
  - London: 150 mi (240 km) S
- Unitary authority: North Lincolnshire
- Ceremonial county: Lincolnshire
- Region: Yorkshire and the Humber
- Country: England
- Sovereign state: United Kingdom
- Post town: BARROW-UPON-HUMBER
- Postcode district: DN19
- Dialling code: 01469
- Police: Humberside
- Fire: Humberside
- Ambulance: East Midlands
- UK Parliament: Brigg and Imminghan

Barrow upon Humber is a village and civil parish in North Lincolnshire, England. The population at the 2021 census was about 3,000.

The village is near the Humber, about 3 miles (5 km) east from Barton-upon-Humber. The small port of Barrow Haven, 1.5 miles (2.4 km) north, on the railway line from Cleethorpes and Grimsby to Barton-upon-Humber handles timber from Latvia and Estonia.

== History ==
Barrow contains the site of a late Anglo-Saxon monastery, which has been fully excavated. The location is now built over, but is marked by a plaque in the village. King Wulfhere gave land to Caedda (Saint Chad) in the 7th century at Ad Barvae (at the wood).

== Culture and community ==
The village is the home of Barton-upon-Humber Rugby Union Football Club and there is also a Bowls Club and a Barrow Sports & Fitness Club. There are numerous clubs and societies that meet in the Vicar's Room (next to the Church), the Methodist Schoolroom (adjoining the chapel) and the Village Hall. Better Barrow Community Project is a charity (No. 1159794) with a particular interest in the history and heritage of the village.

Annually, a wheelbarrow design competition, affectionately called 'Barrow's Barrows', is held in the summer, where residents compete to create the best floral design in a wheelbarrow, often encompassing references to the local area, history, or to British pop culture.

== Landmarks ==
Many of the buildings in the centre of the village are of 18th- and 19th-century origin. A number of buildings of note include Down Hall, Barrow Hall, Papist Hall, Forester's Hall and West Cote Farm.

=== Church ===
The Norman church, with parts that appear to be of earlier origin, is situated on a hilltop to the north of the village and known as the Church of Holy Trinity. When the grounds of the church were landscaped during the 1960s, many graves were lost and the remains were reburied in a communal grave site close to the northern wall of the church.

A sundial designed by James Harrison, younger brother of John Harrison, stood on the south side of the church near the cenotaph but this has now been removed and replaced by a replica. The church lytch gate was removed circa 1960 but there are still lich-stones on the right hand side when entering the church proper. The churchwarden's house that was located immediately to the east of the church path was condemned and demolished at about the same time. The church has a full peal of bells used frequently by local and visiting campanologists.

=== Thornton Abbey ===
Thornton Abbey is situated about 2 miles south from Barrow. On 5 October 1541 Henry VIII, after visiting Hull with the Privy Council, crossed the river in a naval vessel and disembarked at Barrow Haven and rode through Barrow en route to the abbey. Whilst the main part of the abbey has largely disappeared, the substantial gatehouse remains. Both abbey and gatehouse are in the hands of English Heritage.

=== Market place ===
The market place is identified by the stump of a medieval cross. The gas lamp, installed during the Victorian period and which topped the stones, was removed in the first half of the 20th century. A replica lamp, using the original iron support was reinstated in 2024. The marketplace served as a car park for many years but was returned to a public space in 2024. The original shape and size can be determined from the alignment of the houses on the northern and eastern sides. The space is used for a number of village events including the annual Wheelbarrow Weekend and the Christmas Fair. Recently trees have been planted to replace those removed in the early years of this century. In 2020, a statue of John Harrison was installed, alongside new seating bearing motifs celebrating his life and work.

=== Windmills ===
There were three windmills in Barrow upon Humber, the stumps of two of which survive. All were tower mills. Haven Mill was built in 1816 as a sawmill and was later used as a corn mill. A four storey stump remains, converted to residential accommodation. Pearson's Mill was built in 1869. It was working in 1923. A two storey stump remains, used as a garage and store. Riggs Mill was working in 1923, but had ceased work by 1932. It was standing in 1953.

== Notable people ==
- St Chad was given land to found a monastery at Barrow, by King Wulfhere of Mercia.
- Barrow was the birthplace of John Sergeant, the Roman Catholic priest, controversialist and theologian (1623–1707).
- Barrow upon Humber was the home of John Harrison, the pioneer of a reliable way of establishing longitude at sea. A copy of Harrison's 1759 marine chronometer, H4, made by Larcum Kendall, and referred to as K1, travelled in 1772 with Captain Cook on his second Pacific voyage. Captain Cook grew to trust and rely on the timekeeper, which helped contribute to timekeepers being accepted as the way forward in the practical method of determining longitude at sea.
- Harrison was the subject of the 2000 film Longitude starring Michael Gambon. In television, the premise of the discovery of Harrison's clock was used in the plot of several episodes of the BBC situation-comedy Only Fools and Horses in which the main characters, the Trotter brothers, became overnight millionaires following the auction of such an item. There are numerous books about Harrison and a bibliography can be found on the Barrow-upon-Humber website.
- Admiral Nigel Malim was born at Barrow in 1919.
- Richard Duffill, a long-time resident of the village, is featured in the travel books The Great Railway Bazaar and The Kingdom by the Sea by the American writer Paul Theroux.

== Other ==
The German Honorary Consul, covering the East Riding of Yorkshire, Kingston upon Hull, North Lincolnshire, North East Lincolnshire, Humberside, Lincolnshire and Nottinghamshire as well as Nottingham resides in Barrow upon Humber.
