= Top Mill, Barnetby =

Grade II listed tower mill at Barnetby le Wold, Lincolnshire, United Kingdom

- Top Mill, September 2006
- Interactive map of Top Mill, Barnetby

Origin
- Mill name: Top Mill
- Mill location: Barnetby le Wold, Lincolnshire, United Kingdom
- Grid reference: TA 0658 0960
- Coordinates: 53°34′21″N 0°23′28″W

Information
- Purpose: Corn mill
- Type: Tower mill
- Storeys: Three storeys
- No. of sails: Four

Top Mill is a Grade II listed tower mill at Barnetby le Wold, Lincolnshire, United Kingdom. Built in the early 19th century, it worked by wind until 1904, then by engine. It has been converted to residential accommodation.

== History ==
Top Mill was built in the early 19th century. It worked by wind until spring 1904, when the sails blew off. The mill was worked by engine into the 1930s. Gainsborough artist Karl Wood sketched the mill on 18 February 1932. The mill was derelict by 1953. The last three millstones were removed from the mill in 1964. The mill was listed Grade II on 16 June 1986. The mill had been converted for residential use by July 2016.

== Description ==
Top Mill is a three-storey tower mill. It had four sails and drove at least two pairs of millstones. One pair had a French Burr bedstone and a Peak runner stone. The upright shaft and great spur wheel were of cast iron.
