= Westgate Mill, Belton =

Windmill in Lincolnshire, England

- Westgate Mill, November 2020
- Interactive map of Westgate Mill, Belton

Origin
- Mill name: Westgate Mill
- Mill location: Belton, Lincolnshire, United Kingdom
- Grid reference: SE 7697 0750
- Coordinates: 53°33′30″N 0°50′22″W
- Year built: Early 19th century

Information
- Purpose: Corn mill
- Type: Tower mill
- Storeys: Four storeys
- No. of sails: Four
- Type of sails: Patent sails
- Windshaft: Cast iron
- Winding: Fantail
- Fantail blades: Eight
- Auxiliary power: Oil engine
- No. of pairs of millstones: Three

Westgate Mill is a Grade II listed tower mill at Belton, Lincolnshire, United Kingdom. a corn mill built in the early 19th century, it worked by wind until the 1930s and then by engine until 1960. It has been converted to residential accommodation.

== History ==
Westgate Mill was built in the early 19th century by the millwright Johnson of Low Burnham. The mill worked by wind until the early 1930s, latterly on two sails only, as two had been damaged in a storm and were consequently taken down. the miller was E. E. Hewson in 1930. It then worked by oil engine. Milling ceased in 1960. The remaining machinery was removed in 1978 and stored at North Leverton Windmill, Nottinghamshire. A cast iron bridgetree was subsequently used in the restoration of Bardwell Windmill, Suffolk. The mill was listed Grade II on 10 September 1987. it was converted to residential accommodation between 1982 and 1984.

== Description ==
Westgate Mill is a four storey tower mill. It has an ogee cap. Four Patent sails were carried on a cast iron windshaft, mounted on a cross. The sails had seven bays; six bays had three shutters and the innermost bay had two shutters. The mill was winded by an eight-bladed fanatail. The mill drove three pairs of millstones. Two pairs were French Burr stones and one pair were Peak Stones. The upright shaft and great spur wheel were of cast iron. The stones were driven overdrift.
