= Bell's Mill, Brigg =

Windmill in Brigg, Lincolnshire, England

Bells Mill, Brigg
- Bell's Mill, May 2010
- Interactive map of Bells Mill, Brigg

Origin
- Mill name: Bell's Mill
- Mill location: Brigg, Lincolnshire, United Kingdom
- Grid reference: SE 9965 0647
- Coordinates: 53°32′44″N 0°29′52″W
- Year built: 1837

Information
- Purpose: Corn mill
- Type: Tower mill
- Storeys: Five storeys
- No. of sails: Four
- Type of sails: Patent sails

Bell's Mill is a Grade II listed tower mill in Brigg, Lincolnshire, United Kingdom. A corn mill built in 1837, it worked by wind until c.1920, then by engine until c.1956. The derelict tower survives, mostly devoid of machinery.

== History ==
Bell's Mill was built in 1837 by millwrights James Hart & Son, Brigg at a cost of £900. It worked by wind until c.1920, then by engine. The mill was sketched by Gainsborough artist Karl Wood on 28 January 1932. It had lost its cap and sails by then. Milling by engine ceased c.1956. The mill was listed Grade II on 6 August 1976.

== Description ==
Bell's Mill is a five storey tower mill. It had four double Patent sails. The mill has a wooden upright shaft with a cast iron wallower. The great spur wheel was cast iron. The millstones were driven overdrift.
