= Hanson's Mill, Burgh le Marsh =

Windmill in Burgh Le Marsh, East Lindsey, Lincolnshire, England, UK

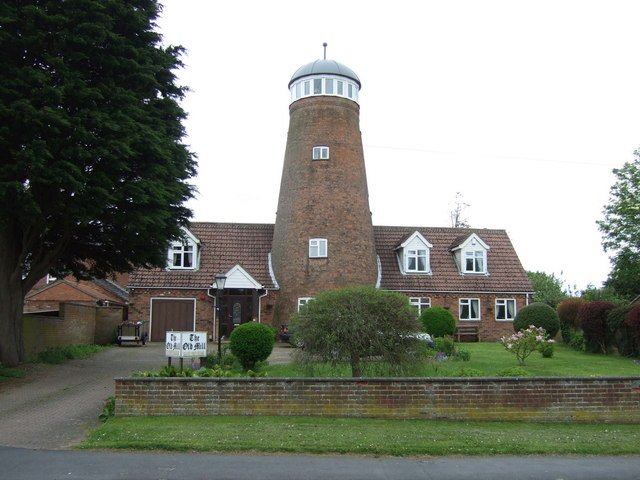
- Hanson's Mill, June 2013
- Interactive map of Hanson's Mill, Burgh le Marsh

Origin
- Mill name: Hanson's Mill; West End Mill
- Mill location: Burgh le Marsh, Lincolnshire, United Kingdom
- Grid reference: TF 4979 6506
- Coordinates: 53°09′41″N 0°14′20″E
- Year built: 1855

Information
- Purpose: Corn mill
- Type: Tower mill
- Storeys: Five storeys
- No. of sails: Four
- Type of sails: Patent sails
- Windshaft: Cast iron
- Winding: Fantail
- Fantail blades: Six
- No. of pairs of millstones: Three pairs

Hanson's or West End Mill is a Grade II listed tower mill at Burgh le Marsh, Lincolnshire, United Kingdom. A tower mill built in 1855 on the site of a post mill, it worked by wind until the 1930s. The tower survives devoid of machinery and converted to residential accommodation.

== History ==
A post mill stood on this site in 1842. Hanson's mill was described as "newly erected" in 1855. The mill worked by wind until the 1930s and the sails were taken down in 1938. the mill was derelict by 1953. In 1964, machinery including the upright shaft, great spur wheel and a pair of millstones were removed for use in the restoration of Ashby's Mill, Brixton, London. The mill had lost its cap by 1977, although the cap frame remained. In 1985, planning permission was given for the demolition of the mill. Peter Dolman noted that at the time, it was hoped to salvage surviving machinery if the demolition took place. The mill was listed Grade II on 9 January 1987. It was subsequently converted to residential accommodation.

== Description ==
Hanson's Mill is a five-storey tower mill. It had an ogee cap winded by a six-bladed fantail. Four single Patent sails were carried on a cast iron windshaft, mounted on a cross. The sails had seven bays of three shutters. The mill drove three pairs of millstones. Two pairs were French Burr stones and one pair were Peak stones. The mill also drove a flour dresser.
