= Metheringham Windmill =

Windmill in Metheringham, Lincolnshire, England

Coordinates: 53°08′16″N 0°24′42″W

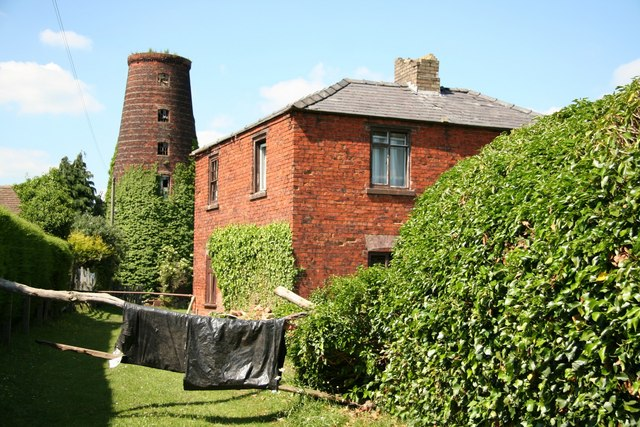
- Disused windmill and Mill House at Metheringham
- Interactive map of Metheringham Windmill

Origin
- Mill name: Metheringham Windmill
- Mill location: Metheringham, Lincolnshire
- Grid reference: TF 063 613
- Year built: 1867

Information
- Type: Tower mill
- Storeys: Six storeys
- No. of sails: Six sails
- Type of sails: Patent sails
- Windshaft: Cast iron
- No. of pairs of millstones: Four pairs

Metheringham Windmill, locally known as The Old Meg Flour Mill, was a six-storeyed, six-sailed, and tarred slender Lincolnshire type windmill with the typical white ogee cap and fantail. The mill is derelict.

== History ==
Metheringham Windmill was built in 1867 to be used to grind flour from grain. Located on a paddock at the eponymous village in North Kesteven south of Lincoln, it is one of the many tall brick-tower mills of Lincolnshire with a stage, now disused.

The mill was equipped with a complete iron gear, six Sutton Patent sails, which drove her four pairs of millstones, but was never prosperous. She later lost up to four of her sails, which were not replaced. The remaining sails were juggled around for balance. Having started with 6 sails, she later ran with four, then two, and finally with three, finishing her sixty years of work around 1930. Until 1942, the mill could be viewed with its unique three sails design.

In the following years the remaining sails went, and after 1961 cap and windshaft followed. The tar coating is now wearing off the tower, giving a free view of the unusual banding in her brickwork of 205 courses. Remains of the iron stage can still be found on the mill on the second floor, but in a bad condition because of the damage done by sail crashes.

There is no public right of access to the mill, so any remains of machinery inside the mill can't be examined.
