= Bilsby =

Village in East Lindsey district, Lincolnshire, England

Coordinates: 53.266650°N 0.207499°E

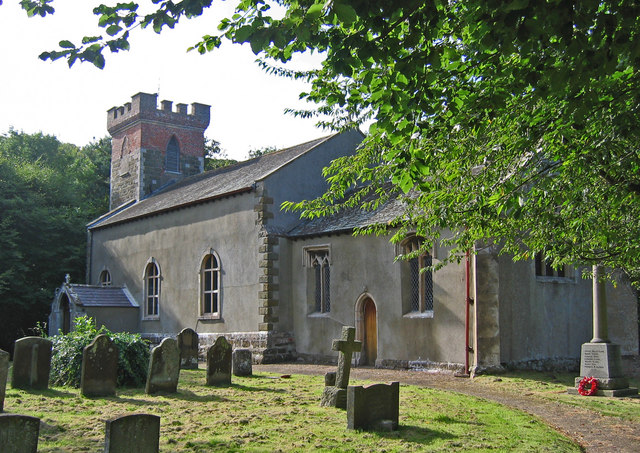
- Holy Trinity, Bilsby parish church

- Location within Lincolnshire
- Population: 487 (including Farlesthorpe2011)
- OS grid reference: TF473766
  - London: 120 mi (190 km) S
- District: East Lindsey
- Shire county: Lincolnshire
- Region: East Midlands
- Country: England
- Sovereign state: United Kingdom
- Post town: Alford
- Postcode district: LN13
- Police: Lincolnshire
- Fire: Lincolnshire
- Ambulance: East Midlands
- UK Parliament: Louth and Horncastle

Bilsby is a village and civil parish in the East Lindsey district of Lincolnshire, England. It lies on the main A1111 road between Alford and Sutton-on-Sea, 1 mile (1.6 km) east of Alford. Thurlby and Asserby are hamlets within Bilsby parish. The censuses showed a parish population of 538 in 2001 and 487 in 2011, with an estimate of 489 in 2019.

== History ==
Bilsby appears in the 1086 Domesday Book with 18 households. Its name may derive from the Norse goddess Bil.

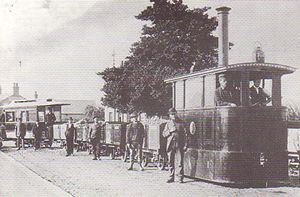
Alford – Sutton Tramway

Mumby Road railway station used to be situated here. In 1897, Thurlby would have been an important junction between the Sutton and Willoughby Railway (part of the East Lincolnshire Railway) and a proposed line from a new port at Sutton-on-Sea to another in Warrington to be built by the Lancashire, Derbyshire and East Coast Railway.

A steam tramway ran through Bilsby between 1884 and 1889. The Alford and Sutton Tramway ran from Alford town to Sutton-on-Sea on rails set into the road; it opened in 1884, but closed only five years later.

=== World War II ===
Two Dornier Do 17 aircraft crashed on August 21 1940, with two Germans killed. At lunchtime, three Luftwaffe aircraft were chased by three Spitfires from RAF Digby, from 611 Sqn.

== Landmarks ==
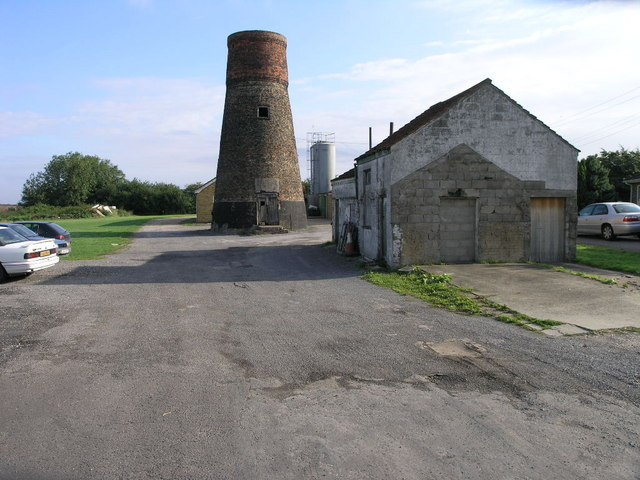
Bilsby Mill

Bilsby Parish Church, dedicated to the Holy Trinity, is a Grade II* listed building, dating from the 15th century. It was extensively repaired in 1841. The building is stuccoed, with an 18th-century stone tower with brick battlements. The pulpit stem is the bole of a tree, with steps cut from another. A memorial slab in the chancel commemorates Sir John Byllesby (died 1640), a prominent figure in his day. His descendant, Major H. M. Byllesby (US Air Service), largely aided a restoration of the church in 1918.

Built about 1740, Bilsby House is a mansion in Georgian style on the site of an older moated, castellated house, reputedly the residence of the Bilsby, sometimes spelt Billesby, family. This family appears to have left the original mansion in 1616.

Bilsby Windmill was built in 1861 and later extended. It operated by wind until 1932. Although disused and missing its cap, the tower of the mill still stands as a Grade II listed building.

== Thurlby and Asserby ==
Thurlby is mentioned in the Domesday Book as a settlement of 18 households. Today it is a hamlet in the parish of Bilsby, but in medieval times it was a parish in its own right, with a church dedicated to St Mary, of which no trace remains.

Earthworks have confirmed that the hamlet of Asserby is smaller today than in medieval times. Unlike Thurlby, it is not mentioned in Domesday and did not have its own church.

== Population ==
Population of Bilsby Civil Parish
Year	1801	1811	1821	1831	1841	1851	1881	1891	1901	1911	1921	1931	1951	1961	2001	2011
Population	337	373	416	453	584	611	510	450	387	377	313	318	293	251	415	487

== Sources ==
- Dolman, Peter (1986). Lincolnshire Windmills, a contemporary survey. Lincoln: Lincolnshire County Council. ISBN 0 86111 126 5.
- Streatfield, George Sidney (1884). Lincolnshire and the Danes. K. Paul, Trench & Co.
