= Market Place Mill, Barton-upon-Humber =

Grade II listed tower mill at Barton-upon-Humber, Lincolnshire

- Market Place Mill, January 2009
- Interactive map of Market Place Mill, Barton-upon-Humber

Origin
- Mill name: Market Place Mill; King's Garth Mill; Kirkby's Mill
- Mill location: Barton-upon-Humber, Lincolnshire, United Kingdom
- Grid reference: TA 032 217
- Coordinates: 53°40′57″N 0°26′18″W
- Year built: 1810

Information
- Purpose: Whiting mill and corn mill
- Type: Tower mill
- Storeys: Six storeys
- No. of sails: Six
- No. of pairs of millstones: Three pairs

Market Place, King's Garth or Kirkby's Mill is a Grade II listed tower mill at Barton-upon-Humber, Lincolnshire, United Kingdom. A whiting and corn mill built in 1810, it worked by wind until 1868, then by gas engine until the 1950s. It has been converted to a pub, retaining some of its internal machinery.

== History ==
Market Place Mill was built as a whiting mill by Thomas Marris in 1810, replacing an earlier tower mill on the same site. Marris died in 1815 and the mill was offered for sale. By then it had been converted to a whiting a corn mill. In 1868, one of the six sails fell off. The others were removed on the orders of the Town Council. The mill was then worked by gas engine.. The mill had lost its cap by 1928, the top of the tower being crenellated. It worked into the 1950s, but was derelict by 1953.

The mill was listed Grade II on 17 September 1976. In 1985, it was proposed to demolish the mill to make way for a supermarket. A public enquiry was held, which decided against the proposal. By July 2005, the mill had been converted to a public house, fitted with a new cap.

== Description ==
Market Place Mill is a seven-storey tower mill. It has an ogee cap and had six sails. The mill drove three pairs of millstones, originally two pairs of Cullen stones and one pair of Peak stones and later two pairs of French Burr stones and one pair having a Peak bedstone with a French Burr runner stone, as well as edge runner stones for whiting. The upright shaft is of wood. the lower section remains. It has a wooden great spur wheel of clasp arm constrution. A cast iron spur wheel of 18 inches (460 mm) diameter also survives. This would have driven the edge runner stones.
