= Kirkstone House School =

Location
- Main Street; Baston, Lincolnshire, PE6 9PA; England; 52.711151°N 0.356159°W

Information
- Type: Private co-educational school
- Established: 1964
- Founder: B K Wyman
- Local authority: Lincolnshire
- Department for Education URN: 120729 Tables
- Head: Corinne Jones
- Gender: Mixed
- Age: 4 to 18
- Enrolment: 108
- Hours in school day: 7
- Houses: Pavenham, Rafeland, Stowe, Truesdale
- Colours: Red, Green, Blue, Yellow
- Website: https://www.kirkstonehouseschool.co.uk
- Last updated: 19 November 2022

Kirkstone House School is an independent day school situated in the rural village of Baston in south Lincolnshire, England.

The school provides education for boys and girls aged between 4 and 18. Ages 4 to 11 are taught in the separate junior school, and up to GCSE at 16 in the senior school, with a traditional house structure. A sixth form was established at the school in 2013 (using the existing school infrastructure) catering for the BTEC Extended Diploma.

== History ==
Kirkstone House School was established in January 1964 by the principal, Mrs Beryl K. Wyman as a nursery school with four pupils. Continued parental demand for independent provision with small class sizes led to gradual expansion to cover the years up to GCSE.
