= Alkborough Windmill =

Grade II listed tower mill at Alkborough, Lincolnshire, United Kingdom

- Alkborough Windmill, January 2009
- Interactive map of Alkborough Windmill

Origin
- Mill name: Alkborough Windmill
- Mill location: Alkborough, Lincolnshire, United Kingdom
- Grid reference: SE 883 215
- Coordinates: 53°40′58″N 0°39′51″W
- Year built: 1855

Information
- Purpose: Corn mill
- Type: Tower mill
- Storeys: Four storeys
- No. of sails: Four
- Type of sails: Patent sails
- Windshaft: Cast iron
- Winding: Fantail
- Fantail blades: Eight
- Auxiliary power: Oil engine
- No. of pairs of millstones: Three

Alkborough Windmill is a Grade II listed tower mill at Alkborough, Lincolnshire, United Kingdom that was built in the 19th century and worked by wind until 1914. The tower survives, stripped of machinery and converted to residential accommodation.

== History ==
Alkborough Windmill was built in 1855 on the site of a post mill. The roundhouse of the post mill was incorporated into the tower. Edward Kew was the miller in 1885. It worked by wind until 1914 when a sail fell off. The other three were removed in 1915. The mill was worked by oil engine into the 1930s. The mill was derelict by 1933. It was listed Grade II on 17 October 1985. The tower remains to its full height, stripped of machinery. The mill was converted to residential accommodation in the 2000s.

== Description ==
Alkborough Windmill is a four storey tower mill. It had an ogee cap winded by a fantail. Four double Patent sails were carried on a cast iron windshaft. The sails had eight bays of three shutters. The mill drove three pairs of millstones. One pair was French Burr stones. One pair had a French Burr bedstone with a Peak runner stone.
