= Burgh le Marsh =

Town in Lincolnshire, England

Coordinates: 53.1610°N 0.2380°E

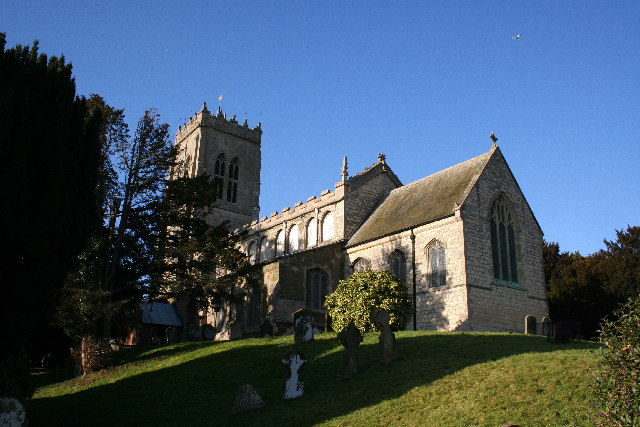
- St Peter and St Paul's Church, Burgh le Marsh

- Location within Lincolnshire
- Population: 2,340 (2011)
- OS grid reference: TF501650
  - London: 110 mi (180 km) S
- District: East Lindsey
- Shire county: Lincolnshire
- Region: East Midlands
- Country: England
- Sovereign state: United Kingdom
- Post town: SKEGNESS
- Postcode district: PE24
- Dialling code: 01754
- Police: Lincolnshire
- Fire: Lincolnshire
- Ambulance: East Midlands
- UK Parliament: Boston and Skegness

Burgh le Marsh is a town and civil parish in the East Lindsey district of Lincolnshire, England.

== Geography ==
The town is built on a low hill surrounded by former marsh land, and the marsh influenced the town's name. Both the windmill and the church are visible from a distance. The A158 used to run through from west to east, but it was rerouted when a new bypass was opened in late 2007, reducing traffic congestion dramatically. A Roman road passes through the town on the way to Skegness, coming from the north-west via Tetford and Ulceby. The town is on the site of a former Roman fort.

== Saxon burial mound ==
Near the parish St. Peter's and St. Paul's Church is a large earthen mound. Excavations in the 1930s found Saxon burial remains here. There is a dip in the top of the mound. Some researchers suggest that it was a site for cockfighting. To this day the mound is known as Cock Hill.

== Amenities ==
The town features a traditional bakery, along with two small convenience shops. There is also a fishmonger's, a post office, a Chinese takeaway, a fish and chip shop, a library, a Co-op supermarket, an antiques store, hairdresser's, and a florist. It previously also had two traditional butchers, along with a post office (which has now been combined with one of the convenience shops), an estate agent, a costume shop, and a cafe.

Public houses include the Fleece Inn on the Market Square, the Red Lion in Storey's Lane, and the Bell Hotel, the White Hart Hotel, and Ye Olde Burgh Inn on the High Street.

The Burgh le Marsh Grade I listed Anglican parish church is dedicated to St Peter and St Paul. There are also a Baptist church and a Methodist chapel.

St Paul's Missionary College was an institution for training Anglican clergy from 1878 to 1936.

The town was served by Burgh le Marsh railway station on the line between Boston and Louth. This station closed in 1970.

== Windmills ==
The town has two tower mills, the untarred Hanson's Mill of 1855 (originally four-sailed), now used as a residence, and the tarred Dobson's Mill, which is now operated as a museum. Built in 1813 by Sam Oxley (who also built Alford Windmill a sister mill in the nearby town of Alford, Lincolnshire), it is unusual as the only left-handed tower mill that has five sails. "Left-handed sails" mean they rotate clockwise when viewed from the front - a very rare type of windmill. On 9 February 2020, Storm Ciara destroyed the sails.

== Media ==
Local news and television programmes are provided by BBC Yorkshire and Lincolnshire and ITV Yorkshire. Television signals are received from the Belmont TV transmitter. Local radio stations are BBC Radio Lincolnshire, Greatest Hits Radio Lincolnshire, Hits Radio Lincolnshire. The town is served by the local newspapers, Skegness Standard and Lincolnshire Echo.

== Twinning ==
Burgh le Marsh is twinned with the town of Beaumont-sur-Sarthe in the Pays de la Loire in France. This twinning began in 1988 and has celebrated its 25th anniversary. The celebrations took place on the weekend of 18 May 2013. The chairmen of the Twinning Associations for each town are Neil Cooper for Burgh Le Marsh and Jean-Pascal Maudet for Beaumont sur Sarthe.

== Gallery ==
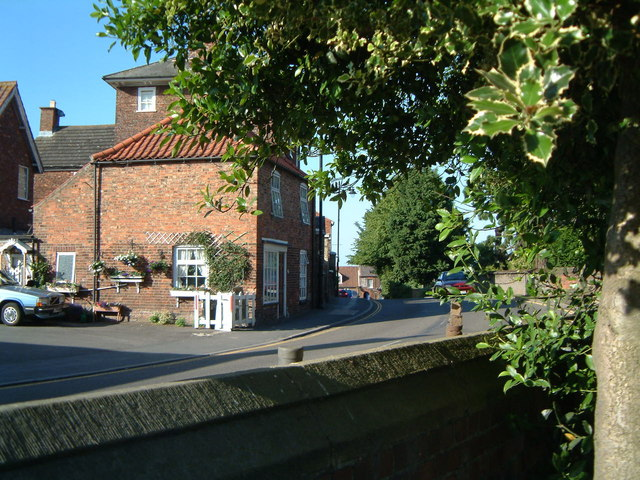
High Street

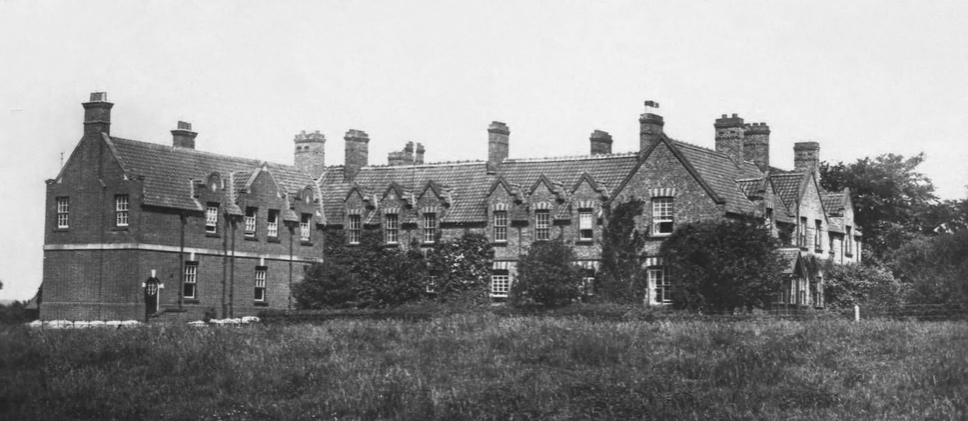
St Paul's College c.1900-10

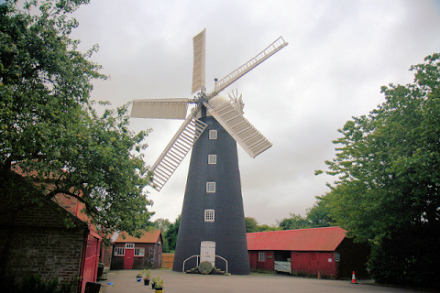
Dobson's Windmill
