= List of civil parishes in Lincolnshire =

This is a list of civil parishes and unparished areas in the ceremonial county of Lincolnshire, England. There are about 623 civil parishes.

== Table of civil parishes ==
Parish	District	Notes
Algarkirk	Boston	Formerly Boston Rural District
Amber Hill	Boston	Formerly Boston Rural District
Benington	Boston	Formerly Boston Rural District
Bicker	Boston	Formerly Boston Rural District
Boston (unparished area)	Boston	Formerly Boston Municipal Borough
Butterwick	Boston	Formerly Boston Rural District
Fishtoft	Boston	Formerly Boston Rural District
Fosdyke	Boston	Formerly Boston Rural District
Frampton	Boston	Formerly Boston Rural District
Freiston	Boston	Formerly Boston Rural District
Holland Fen with Brothertoft	Boston	Formerly Boston Rural District
Kirton	Boston	Formerly Boston Rural District
Leverton	Boston	Formerly Boston Rural District
Old Leake	Boston	Formerly Boston Rural District
Sutterton	Boston	Formerly Boston Rural District
Swineshead	Boston	Formerly Boston Rural District
Wigtoft	Boston	Formerly Boston Rural District
Wrangle	Boston	Formerly Boston Rural District
Wyberton	Boston	Formerly Boston Rural District
Lincoln (unparished area)	Lincoln	Formerly Lincoln County Borough
Eastoft	North Lincolnshire	Formerly Goole Rural District
Garthorpe and Fockerby	North Lincolnshire	Formerly Goole Rural District
Luddington and Haldenby	North Lincolnshire	Formerly Goole Rural District
Woodhall Spa	East Lindsey	Formerly Woodhall Spa Urban District, Formerly Horncastle Rural District
Alford (town)	East Lindsey	Formerly Alford Urban District
Barton (town)	North Lincolnshire	Formerly Barton upon Humber Urban District
Bourne (town)	South Kesteven	Formerly Bourne Urban District
Brigg (town)	North Lincolnshire	Formerly Brigg Urban District
Bigby	West Lindsey	Formerly Caistor Rural District
Bishop Norton	West Lindsey	Formerly Caistor Rural District
Brocklesby	West Lindsey	Formerly Caistor Rural District
Brookenby	West Lindsey	Formerly Caistor Rural District
Buslingthorpe	West Lindsey	Formerly Caistor Rural District
Cabourne	West Lindsey	Formerly Caistor Rural District
Caistor (town)	West Lindsey	Formerly Caistor Rural District
Claxby	West Lindsey	Formerly Caistor Rural District
Glentham	West Lindsey	Formerly Caistor Rural District
Grasby	West Lindsey	Formerly Caistor Rural District
Great Limber	West Lindsey	Formerly Caistor Rural District
Holton le Moor	West Lindsey	Formerly Caistor Rural District
Keelby	West Lindsey	Formerly Caistor Rural District
Kirmond le Mire	West Lindsey	Formerly Caistor Rural District
Legsby	West Lindsey	Formerly Caistor Rural District
Linwood	West Lindsey	Formerly Caistor Rural District
Lissington	West Lindsey	Formerly Caistor Rural District
Middle Rasen	West Lindsey	Formerly Caistor Rural District
Nettleton	West Lindsey	Formerly Caistor Rural District
Normanby le Wold	West Lindsey	Formerly Caistor Rural District
North Kelsey	West Lindsey	Formerly Caistor Rural District
North Willingham	West Lindsey	Formerly Caistor Rural District
Osgodby	West Lindsey	Formerly Caistor Rural District
Owersby	West Lindsey	Formerly Caistor Rural District
Riby	West Lindsey	Formerly Caistor Rural District
Rothwell	West Lindsey	Formerly Caistor Rural District
Searby cum Owmby	West Lindsey	Formerly Caistor Rural District
Sixhills	West Lindsey	Formerly Caistor Rural District
Snitterby	West Lindsey	Formerly Caistor Rural District
Somerby	West Lindsey	Formerly Caistor Rural District
South Kelsey	West Lindsey	Formerly Caistor Rural District
Stainton le Vale	West Lindsey	Formerly Caistor Rural District
Swallow	West Lindsey	Formerly Caistor Rural District
Swinhope	West Lindsey	Formerly Caistor Rural District
Tealby	West Lindsey	Formerly Caistor Rural District
Thoresway	West Lindsey	Formerly Caistor Rural District
Thorganby	West Lindsey	Formerly Caistor Rural District
Toft Newton	West Lindsey	Formerly Caistor Rural District
Waddingham	West Lindsey	Formerly Caistor Rural District
Walesby	West Lindsey	Formerly Caistor Rural District
West Rasen	West Lindsey	Formerly Caistor Rural District
Fleet	South Holland	Formerly East Elloe Rural District
Gedney Hill	South Holland	Formerly East Elloe Rural District
Gedney	South Holland	Formerly East Elloe Rural District
Holbeach	South Holland	Formerly East Elloe Rural District
Little Sutton	South Holland	Formerly East Elloe Rural District
Long Sutton	South Holland	Formerly East Elloe Rural District
Lutton	South Holland	Formerly East Elloe Rural District
Spalding (unparished area)	South Holland	Formerly Spalding Urban District
Sutton Bridge	South Holland	Formerly East Elloe Rural District
Sutton St Edmund	South Holland	Formerly East Elloe Rural District
Sutton St James	South Holland	Formerly East Elloe Rural District
Tydd St Mary	South Holland	Formerly East Elloe Rural District
Whaplode	South Holland	Formerly East Elloe Rural District
Anwick	North Kesteven	Formerly East Kesteven Rural District
Asgarby and Howell	North Kesteven	Formerly East Kesteven Rural District
Ashby de la Launde and Bloxholm	North Kesteven	Formerly East Kesteven Rural District
Aswarby and Swarby	North Kesteven	Formerly East Kesteven Rural District
Aunsby and Dembleby	North Kesteven	Formerly East Kesteven Rural District
Billinghay	North Kesteven	Formerly East Kesteven Rural District
Blankney	North Kesteven	Formerly East Kesteven Rural District
Cranwell, Brauncewell and Byard's Leap	North Kesteven	Formerly East Kesteven Rural District
Burton Pedwardine	North Kesteven	Formerly East Kesteven Rural District
Culverthorpe and Kelby	North Kesteven	Formerly East Kesteven Rural District
Digby	North Kesteven	Formerly East Kesteven Rural District
Dogdyke	North Kesteven	Formerly East Kesteven Rural District
Dorrington	North Kesteven	Formerly East Kesteven Rural District
Ewerby and Evedon	North Kesteven	Formerly East Kesteven Rural District
Great Hale	North Kesteven	Formerly East Kesteven Rural District
Heckington	North Kesteven	Formerly East Kesteven Rural District
Helpringham	North Kesteven	Formerly East Kesteven Rural District
Kirkby la Thorpe	North Kesteven	Formerly East Kesteven Rural District
Leasingham	North Kesteven	Formerly East Kesteven Rural District
Little Hale	North Kesteven	Formerly East Kesteven Rural District
Martin	North Kesteven	Formerly East Kesteven Rural District
Newton and Haceby	North Kesteven	Formerly East Kesteven Rural District
North Kyme	North Kesteven	Formerly East Kesteven Rural District
North Rauceby	North Kesteven	Formerly East Kesteven Rural District
Osbournby	North Kesteven	Formerly East Kesteven Rural District
Rowston	North Kesteven	Formerly East Kesteven Rural District
Roxholm	North Kesteven	Formerly East Kesteven Rural District
Ruskington	North Kesteven	Formerly East Kesteven Rural District
Scopwick	North Kesteven	Formerly East Kesteven Rural District
Scredington	North Kesteven	Formerly East Kesteven Rural District
Silk Willoughby	North Kesteven	Formerly East Kesteven Rural District
South Kyme	North Kesteven	Formerly East Kesteven Rural District
South Rauceby	North Kesteven	Formerly East Kesteven Rural District
Swaton	North Kesteven	Formerly East Kesteven Rural District
Temple Bruer with Temple High Grange	North Kesteven	Formerly East Kesteven Rural District
Threekingham	North Kesteven	Formerly East Kesteven Rural District
Timberland	North Kesteven	Formerly East Kesteven Rural District
Walcot near Folkingham	North Kesteven	Formerly East Kesteven Rural District
Walcott	North Kesteven	Formerly East Kesteven Rural District
Wilsford	North Kesteven	Formerly East Kesteven Rural District
Blyborough	West Lindsey	Formerly Gainsborough Rural District
Blyton	West Lindsey	Formerly Gainsborough Rural District
Brampton	West Lindsey	Formerly Gainsborough Rural District
Corringham	West Lindsey	Formerly Gainsborough Rural District
East Ferry	West Lindsey	Formerly Gainsborough Rural District
East Stockwith	West Lindsey	Formerly Gainsborough Rural District
Fenton, West Lindsey	West Lindsey	Formerly Gainsborough Rural District
Fillingham	West Lindsey	Formerly Gainsborough Rural District
Gate Burton	West Lindsey	Formerly Gainsborough Rural District
Glentworth	West Lindsey	Formerly Gainsborough Rural District
Grayingham	West Lindsey	Formerly Gainsborough Rural District
Hardwick	West Lindsey	Formerly Gainsborough Rural District
Harpswell	West Lindsey	Formerly Gainsborough Rural District
Heapham	West Lindsey	Formerly Gainsborough Rural District
Hemswell Cliff	West Lindsey	Formerly Gainsborough Rural District
Hemswell	West Lindsey	Formerly Gainsborough Rural District
Kettlethorpe	West Lindsey	Formerly Gainsborough Rural District
Kexby	West Lindsey	Formerly Gainsborough Rural District
Knaith	West Lindsey	Formerly Gainsborough Rural District
Laughton	West Lindsey	Formerly Gainsborough Rural District
Lea	West Lindsey	Formerly Gainsborough Rural District
Marton	West Lindsey	Formerly Gainsborough Rural District
Morton	West Lindsey	Formerly Gainsborough Rural District
Newton on Trent	West Lindsey	Formerly Gainsborough Rural District
Northorpe	West Lindsey	Formerly Gainsborough Rural District
Pilham	West Lindsey	Formerly Gainsborough Rural District
Scotter	West Lindsey	Formerly Gainsborough Rural District
Scotton	West Lindsey	Formerly Gainsborough Rural District
Springthorpe	West Lindsey	Formerly Gainsborough Rural District
Stow	West Lindsey	Formerly Gainsborough Rural District
Sturton by Stow	West Lindsey	Formerly Gainsborough Rural District
Thonock	West Lindsey	Formerly Gainsborough Rural District
Torksey	West Lindsey	Formerly Gainsborough Rural District
Upton	West Lindsey	Formerly Gainsborough Rural District
Walkerith	West Lindsey	Formerly Gainsborough Rural District
Wildsworth	West Lindsey	Formerly Gainsborough Rural District
Willingham	West Lindsey	Formerly Gainsborough Rural District
Willoughton	West Lindsey	Formerly Gainsborough Rural District
Gainsborough (town)	West Lindsey	Formerly Gainsborough Rural District
Alkborough	North Lincolnshire	Formerly Glanford Brigg Rural District
Appleby	North Lincolnshire	Formerly Glanford Brigg Rural District
Ashby Parkland	North Lincolnshire	Formerly Glanford Brigg Rural District
Barnetby le Wold	North Lincolnshire	Formerly Glanford Brigg Rural District
Barrow upon Humber	North Lincolnshire	Formerly Glanford Brigg Rural District
Bonby	North Lincolnshire	Formerly Glanford Brigg Rural District
Bottesford (town)	North Lincolnshire	Formerly Glanford Brigg Rural District
Broughton (town)	North Lincolnshire	Formerly Glanford Brigg Rural District
Burringham	North Lincolnshire	Formerly Glanford Brigg Rural District
Burton upon Stather	North Lincolnshire	Formerly Glanford Brigg Rural District
Cadney	North Lincolnshire	Formerly Glanford Brigg Rural District
Croxton	North Lincolnshire	Formerly Glanford Brigg Rural District
East Butterwick	North Lincolnshire	Formerly Glanford Brigg Rural District
East Halton	North Lincolnshire	Formerly Glanford Brigg Rural District
Elsham	North Lincolnshire	Formerly Glanford Brigg Rural District
Flixborough	North Lincolnshire	Formerly Glanford Brigg Rural District
Goxhill	North Lincolnshire	Formerly Glanford Brigg Rural District
Gunness	North Lincolnshire	Formerly Glanford Brigg Rural District
Hibaldstow	North Lincolnshire	Formerly Glanford Brigg Rural District
Horkstow	North Lincolnshire	Formerly Glanford Brigg Rural District
Kirmington	North Lincolnshire	Formerly Glanford Brigg Rural District
Kirton in Lindsey (town)	North Lincolnshire	Formerly Glanford Brigg Rural District
Manton	North Lincolnshire	Formerly Glanford Brigg Rural District
Melton Ross	North Lincolnshire	Formerly Glanford Brigg Rural District
Messingham	North Lincolnshire	Formerly Glanford Brigg Rural District
New Holland	North Lincolnshire	Formerly Glanford Brigg Rural District
North Killingholme	North Lincolnshire	Formerly Glanford Brigg Rural District
Redbourne	North Lincolnshire	Formerly Glanford Brigg Rural District
Roxby cum Risby	North Lincolnshire	Formerly Glanford Brigg Rural District
Saxby All Saints	North Lincolnshire	Formerly Glanford Brigg Rural District
Scawby	North Lincolnshire	Formerly Glanford Brigg Rural District
Scunthorpe (unparished area)	North Lincolnshire	Formerly Scunthorpe Municipal Borough
South Ferriby	North Lincolnshire	Formerly Glanford Brigg Rural District
South Killingholme	North Lincolnshire	Formerly Glanford Brigg Rural District
Thornton Curtis	North Lincolnshire	Formerly Glanford Brigg Rural District
Ulceby	North Lincolnshire	Formerly Glanford Brigg Rural District
West Halton	North Lincolnshire	Formerly Glanford Brigg Rural District
Whitton	North Lincolnshire	Formerly Glanford Brigg Rural District
Winteringham	North Lincolnshire	Formerly Glanford Brigg Rural District
Winterton (town)	North Lincolnshire	Formerly Glanford Brigg Rural District
Wootton	North Lincolnshire	Formerly Glanford Brigg Rural District
Worlaby	North Lincolnshire	Formerly Glanford Brigg Rural District
Wrawby	North Lincolnshire	Formerly Glanford Brigg Rural District
Cleethorpes (unparished area)	N E Lincs	Formerly Cleethorpes Municipal Borough
Great Coates	N E Lincs	Formerly Grimsby County Borough
Grimsby (unparished area)	N E lincs	Formerly Grimsby County Borough
Ashby cum Fenby	N E Lincs	Formerly Grimsby Rural District
Aylesby	N E Lincs	Formerly Grimsby Rural District
Barnoldby le Beck	N E Lincs	Formerly Grimsby Rural District
Beelsby	N E Lincs	Formerly Grimsby Rural District
Bradley	N E Lincs	Formerly Grimsby Rural District
Brigsley	N E Lincs	Formerly Grimsby Rural District
East Ravendale	N E Lincs	Formerly Grimsby Rural District
Habrough	N E Lincs	Formerly Grimsby Rural District
Hatcliffe	N E Lincs	Formerly Grimsby Rural District
Hawerby cum Beesby	N E Lincs	Formerly Grimsby Rural District
Healing	N E Lincs	Formerly Grimsby Rural District
Humberston	N E Lincs	Formerly Grimsby Rural District
Immingham (town)	N E Lincs	Formerly Grimsby Rural District
Irby	N E Lincs	Formerly Grimsby Rural District
Laceby	N E Lincs	Formerly Grimsby Rural District
New Waltham	N E Lincs	Formerly Grimsby Rural District
Stallingborough	N E Lincs	Formerly Grimsby Rural District
Waltham	N E Lincs	Formerly Grimsby Rural District
West Ravendale	N E Lincs	Formerly Grimsby Rural District
Wold Newton	N E Lincs	Formerly Grimsby Rural District
Asterby	East Lindsey	Formerly Horncastle Rural District
Baumber	East Lindsey	Formerly Horncastle Rural District
Belchford	East Lindsey	Formerly Horncastle Rural District
Benniworth	East Lindsey	Formerly Horncastle Rural District
Bucknall	East Lindsey	Formerly Horncastle Rural District
Claxby with Moorby	East Lindsey	Formerly Horncastle Rural District
Coningsby (town)	East Lindsey	Formerly Horncastle Rural District
East Barkwith	East Lindsey	Formerly Horncastle Rural District
Edlington with Wispington	East Lindsey	Formerly Horncastle Rural District
Fulletby	East Lindsey	Formerly Horncastle Rural District
Gautby	East Lindsey	Formerly Horncastle Rural District
Goulceby	East Lindsey	Formerly Horncastle Rural District
Great Sturton	East Lindsey	Formerly Horncastle Rural District
Greetham with Somersby	East Lindsey	Formerly Horncastle Rural District
Hagworthingham	East Lindsey	Formerly Horncastle Rural District
Haltham	East Lindsey	Formerly Horncastle Rural District
Hameringham	East Lindsey	Formerly Horncastle Rural District
Hatton	East Lindsey	Formerly Horncastle Rural District
Hemingby	East Lindsey	Formerly Horncastle Rural District
High Toynton	East Lindsey	Formerly Horncastle Rural District
Horsington	East Lindsey	Formerly Horncastle Rural District
Kirkby on Bain	East Lindsey	Formerly Horncastle Rural District
Langton by Wragby	East Lindsey	Formerly Horncastle Rural District
Langton	East Lindsey	Formerly Horncastle Rural District
Low Toynton	East Lindsey	Formerly Horncastle Rural District
Lusby with Winceby	East Lindsey	Formerly Horncastle Rural District
Mareham le Fen	East Lindsey	Formerly Horncastle Rural District
Mareham on the Hill	East Lindsey	Formerly Horncastle Rural District
Market Stainton	East Lindsey	Formerly Horncastle Rural District
Minting	East Lindsey	Formerly Horncastle Rural District
Ranby	East Lindsey	Formerly Horncastle Rural District
Revesby	East Lindsey	Formerly Horncastle Rural District
Roughton	East Lindsey	Formerly Horncastle Rural District
Scamblesby	East Lindsey	Formerly Horncastle Rural District
Scrivelsby	East Lindsey	Formerly Horncastle Rural District
Sotby	East Lindsey	Formerly Horncastle Rural District
Stixwould and Woodhall	East Lindsey	Formerly Horncastle Rural District
Tattershall Thorpe	East Lindsey	Formerly Horncastle Rural District
Tattershall	East Lindsey	Formerly Horncastle Rural District
Tetford	East Lindsey	Formerly Horncastle Rural District
Thimbleby	East Lindsey	Formerly Horncastle Rural District
Tumby	East Lindsey	Formerly Horncastle Rural District
Tupholme	East Lindsey	Formerly Horncastle Rural District
Waddingworth	East Lindsey	Formerly Horncastle Rural District
West Ashby	East Lindsey	Formerly Horncastle Rural District
West Barkwith	East Lindsey	Formerly Horncastle Rural District
West Torrington	East Lindsey	Formerly Horncastle Rural District
Wildmore	East Lindsey	Formerly Horncastle Rural District
Wood Enderby	East Lindsey	Formerly Horncastle Rural District
Wragby	East Lindsey	Formerly Horncastle Rural District
Horncastle (town)	East Lindsey	Formerly Horncastle Rural District
Amcotts	North Lincolnshire	Formerly Isle of Axholme Rural District
Belton	North Lincolnshire	Formerly Isle of Axholme Rural District
Crowle and Ealand (town)	North Lincolnshire	Formerly Isle of Axholme Rural District
Epworth (town)	North Lincolnshire	Formerly Isle of Axholme Rural District
Haxey	North Lincolnshire	Formerly Isle of Axholme Rural District
Keadby with Althorpe	North Lincolnshire	Formerly Isle of Axholme Rural District
Owston Ferry	North Lincolnshire	Formerly Isle of Axholme Rural District
West Butterwick	North Lincolnshire	Formerly Isle of Axholme Rural District
Wroot	North Lincolnshire	Formerly Isle of Axholme Rural District
Louth (town)	East Lindsey	Formerly Louth Municipal Borough
Aby with Greenfield	East Lindsey	Formerly Louth Rural District
Alvingham	East Lindsey	Formerly Louth Rural District
Authorpe	East Lindsey	Formerly Louth Rural District
Beesby with Saleby	East Lindsey	Formerly Louth Rural District
Belleau	East Lindsey	Formerly Louth Rural District
Binbrook	East Lindsey	Formerly Louth Rural District
Brackenborough with Little Grimsby	East Lindsey	Formerly Louth Rural District
Burgh on Bain	East Lindsey	Formerly Louth Rural District
Burwell	East Lindsey	Formerly Louth Rural District
Calcethorpe with Kelstern	East Lindsey	Formerly Louth Rural District
Claythorpe	East Lindsey	Formerly Louth Rural District
Conisholme	East Lindsey	Formerly Louth Rural District
Covenham St Bartholomew	East Lindsey	Formerly Louth Rural District
Covenham St Mary	East Lindsey	Formerly Louth Rural District
Donington on Bain	East Lindsey	Formerly Louth Rural District
Elkington	East Lindsey	Formerly Louth Rural District
Fotherby	East Lindsey	Formerly Louth Rural District
Fulstow	East Lindsey	Formerly Louth Rural District
Gayton le Marsh	East Lindsey	Formerly Louth Rural District
Gayton le Wold	East Lindsey	Formerly Louth Rural District
Grainsby	East Lindsey	Formerly Louth Rural District
Grainthorpe	East Lindsey	Formerly Louth Rural District
Great Carlton	East Lindsey	Formerly Louth Rural District
Grimoldby	East Lindsey	Formerly Louth Rural District
Hainton	East Lindsey	Formerly Louth Rural District
Hallington	East Lindsey	Formerly Louth Rural District
Hannah cum Hagnaby	East Lindsey	Formerly Louth Rural District
Haugh	East Lindsey	Formerly Louth Rural District
Haugham	East Lindsey	Formerly Louth Rural District
Holton le Clay	East Lindsey	Formerly Louth Rural District
Keddington	East Lindsey	Formerly Louth Rural District
Legbourne	East Lindsey	Formerly Louth Rural District
Little Carlton	East Lindsey	Formerly Louth Rural District
Little Cawthorpe	East Lindsey	Formerly Louth Rural District
Ludborough	East Lindsey	Formerly Louth Rural District
Ludford	East Lindsey	Formerly Louth Rural District
Maidenwell	East Lindsey	Formerly Louth Rural District
Maltby le Marsh	East Lindsey	Formerly Louth Rural District
Manby	East Lindsey	Formerly Louth Rural District
Marshchapel	East Lindsey	Formerly Louth Rural District
Muckton	East Lindsey	Formerly Louth Rural District
North Cotes	East Lindsey	Formerly Louth Rural District
North Cockerington	East Lindsey	Formerly Louth Rural District
North Ormsby	East Lindsey	Formerly Louth Rural District
North Somercotes	East Lindsey	Formerly Louth Rural District
North Thoresby	East Lindsey	Formerly Louth Rural District
Raithby cum Maltby	East Lindsey	Formerly Louth Rural District
Reston	East Lindsey	Formerly Louth Rural District
Saltfleetby	East Lindsey	Formerly Louth Rural District
Skidbrooke with Saltfleet Haven	East Lindsey	Formerly Louth Rural District
South Cockerington	East Lindsey	Formerly Louth Rural District
South Somercotes	East Lindsey	Formerly Louth Rural District
South Willingham	East Lindsey	Formerly Louth Rural District
Stenigot	East Lindsey	Formerly Louth Rural District
Stewton	East Lindsey	Formerly Louth Rural District
Strubby with Woodthorpe	East Lindsey	Formerly Louth Rural District
Swaby	East Lindsey	Formerly Louth Rural District
Tathwell	East Lindsey	Formerly Louth Rural District
Tetney	East Lindsey	Formerly Louth Rural District
Theddlethorpe All Saints	East Lindsey	Formerly Louth Rural District
Theddlethorpe St Helen	East Lindsey	Formerly Louth Rural District
Utterby	East Lindsey	Formerly Louth Rural District
Waithe	East Lindsey	Formerly Louth Rural District
Walmsgate	East Lindsey	Formerly Louth Rural District
Welton Le Wold	East Lindsey	Formerly Louth Rural District
Withcall	East Lindsey	Formerly Louth Rural District
Withern with Stain	East Lindsey	Formerly Louth Rural District
Wyham cum Cadeby	East Lindsey	Formerly Louth Rural District
Yarburgh	East Lindsey	Formerly Louth Rural District
Mablethorpe and Sutton (town)	East Lindsey	Formerly Mablethorpe and Sutton Urban District
Market Rasen (town)	West Lindsey	Formerly Market Rasen Urban District
Broadholme	West Lindsey	Formerly Newark Rural District
Aubourn with Haddington	North Kesteven	Formerly North Kesteven Rural District
Bassingham	North Kesteven	Formerly North Kesteven Rural District
Beckingham	North Kesteven	Formerly North Kesteven Rural District
Boothby Graffoe	North Kesteven	Formerly North Kesteven Rural District
Bracebridge Heath	North Kesteven	Formerly North Kesteven Rural District
Branston and Mere	North Kesteven	Formerly North Kesteven Rural District
Brant Broughton and Stragglethorpe	North Kesteven	Formerly North Kesteven Rural District
Canwick	North Kesteven	Formerly North Kesteven Rural District
Carlton le Moorland	North Kesteven	Formerly North Kesteven Rural District
Coleby	North Kesteven	Formerly North Kesteven Rural District
Doddington and Whisby	North Kesteven	Formerly North Kesteven Rural District
Dunston	North Kesteven	Formerly North Kesteven Rural District
Eagle and Swinethorpe	North Kesteven	Formerly North Kesteven Rural District
Harmston	North Kesteven	Formerly North Kesteven Rural District
Heighington	North Kesteven	Formerly North Kesteven Rural District
Leadenham	North Kesteven	Formerly North Kesteven Rural District
Metheringham	North Kesteven	Formerly North Kesteven Rural District
Navenby	North Kesteven	Formerly North Kesteven Rural District
Nocton	North Kesteven	Formerly North Kesteven Rural District
North Hykeham (town)	North Kesteven	Formerly North Kesteven Rural District
North Scarle	North Kesteven	Formerly North Kesteven Rural District
Norton Disney	North Kesteven	Formerly North Kesteven Rural District
Potter Hanworth	North Kesteven	Formerly North Kesteven Rural District
Skellingthorpe	North Kesteven	Formerly North Kesteven Rural District
South Hykeham	North Kesteven	Formerly North Kesteven Rural District
Stapleford	North Kesteven	Formerly North Kesteven Rural District
Swinderby	North Kesteven	Formerly North Kesteven Rural District
Thorpe on the Hill	North Kesteven	Formerly North Kesteven Rural District
Thurlby	North Kesteven	Formerly North Kesteven Rural District
Waddington	North Kesteven	Formerly North Kesteven Rural District
Washingborough	North Kesteven	Formerly North Kesteven Rural District
Welbourn	North Kesteven	Formerly North Kesteven Rural District
Wellingore	North Kesteven	Formerly North Kesteven Rural District
Witham St Hughs	North Kesteven	Formerly North Kesteven Rural District
Skegness (town)	East Lindsey	Formerly Skegness Urban District
Sleaford (town)	North Kesteven	Formerly Sleaford Urban District
Aslackby and Laughton	South Kesteven	Formerly South Kesteven Rural District
Barholm and Stowe	South Kesteven	Formerly South Kesteven Rural District
Baston	South Kesteven	Formerly South Kesteven Rural District
Billingborough	South Kesteven	Formerly South Kesteven Rural District
Braceborough and Wilsthorpe	South Kesteven	Formerly South Kesteven Rural District
Careby Aunby and Holywell	South Kesteven	Formerly South Kesteven Rural District
Carlby	South Kesteven	Formerly South Kesteven Rural District
Castle Bytham	South Kesteven	Formerly South Kesteven Rural District
Corby Glen	South Kesteven	Formerly South Kesteven Rural District
Counthorpe and Creeton	South Kesteven	Formerly South Kesteven Rural District
Deeping St James	South Kesteven	Formerly South Kesteven Rural District
Dowsby	South Kesteven	Formerly South Kesteven Rural District
Dunsby	South Kesteven	Formerly South Kesteven Rural District
Edenham	South Kesteven	Formerly South Kesteven Rural District
Folkingham	South Kesteven	Formerly South Kesteven Rural District
Greatford	South Kesteven	Formerly South Kesteven Rural District
Grantham (town)	South Kesteven	Formerly Grantham Municipal Borough
Haconby	South Kesteven	Formerly South Kesteven Rural District
Horbling	South Kesteven	Formerly South Kesteven Rural District
Irnham	South Kesteven	Formerly South Kesteven Rural District
Kirkby Underwood	South Kesteven	Formerly South Kesteven Rural District
Langtoft	South Kesteven	Formerly South Kesteven Rural District
Little Bytham	South Kesteven	Formerly South Kesteven Rural District
Market Deeping (town)	South Kesteven	Formerly South Kesteven Rural District
Morton and Hanthorpe	South Kesteven	Formerly South Kesteven Rural District
Pointon and Sempringham	South Kesteven	Formerly South Kesteven Rural District
Rippingale	South Kesteven	Formerly South Kesteven Rural District
Swayfield	South Kesteven	Formerly South Kesteven Rural District
Swinstead	South Kesteven	Formerly South Kesteven Rural District
Tallington	South Kesteven	Formerly South Kesteven Rural District
Thurlby	South Kesteven	Formerly South Kesteven Rural District
Toft with Lound and Manthorpe	South Kesteven	Formerly South Kesteven Rural District
Uffington	South Kesteven	Formerly South Kesteven Rural District
West Deeping	South Kesteven	Formerly South Kesteven Rural District
Witham on the Hill	South Kesteven	Formerly South Kesteven Rural District
Cowbit	South Holland	Formerly Spalding Rural District
Crowland	South Holland	Formerly Spalding Rural District
Deeping St Nicholas	South Holland	Formerly Spalding Rural District
Donington	South Holland	Formerly Spalding Rural District
Gosberton	South Holland	Formerly Spalding Rural District
Pinchbeck	South Holland	Formerly Spalding Rural District
Quadring	South Holland	Formerly Spalding Rural District
Surfleet	South Holland	Formerly Spalding Rural District
The Moultons	South Holland	Formerly Spalding Rural District
Weston	South Holland	Formerly Spalding Rural District
Addlethorpe	East Lindsey	Formerly Spilsby Rural District
Anderby	East Lindsey	Formerly Spilsby Rural District
Ashby with Scremby	East Lindsey	Formerly Spilsby Rural District
Aswardby	East Lindsey	Formerly Spilsby Rural District
Bilsby	East Lindsey	Formerly Spilsby Rural District
Bolingbroke	East Lindsey	Formerly Spilsby Rural District
Bratoft	East Lindsey	Formerly Spilsby Rural District
Brinkhill	East Lindsey	Formerly Spilsby Rural District
Burgh le Marsh (town)	East Lindsey	Formerly Spilsby Rural District
Candlesby with Gunby	East Lindsey	Formerly Spilsby Rural District
Carrington and New Bolingbroke	East Lindsey	Formerly Spilsby Rural District
Chapel St Leonards	East Lindsey	Formerly Spilsby Rural District
Claxby St Andrew	East Lindsey	Formerly Spilsby Rural District
Croft	East Lindsey	Formerly Spilsby Rural District
Cumberworth	East Lindsey	Formerly Spilsby Rural District
Dalby	East Lindsey	Formerly Spilsby Rural District
East Keal	East Lindsey	Formerly Spilsby Rural District
East Kirkby	East Lindsey	Formerly Spilsby Rural District
Eastville	East Lindsey	Formerly Spilsby Rural District
Farlesthorpe	East Lindsey	Formerly Spilsby Rural District
Firsby	East Lindsey	Formerly Spilsby Rural District
Friskney	East Lindsey	Formerly Spilsby Rural District
Frithville and Westville	East Lindsey	Formerly Spilsby Rural District
Great Steeping	East Lindsey	Formerly Spilsby Rural District
Halton Holegate	East Lindsey	Formerly Spilsby Rural District
Harrington	East Lindsey	Formerly Spilsby Rural District
Hogsthorpe	East Lindsey	Formerly Spilsby Rural District
Hundleby	East Lindsey	Formerly Spilsby Rural District
Huttoft	East Lindsey	Formerly Spilsby Rural District
Ingoldmells	East Lindsey	Formerly Spilsby Rural District
Irby in the Marsh	East Lindsey	Formerly Spilsby Rural District
Langriville	East Lindsey	Formerly Spilsby Rural District
Langton by Spilsby	East Lindsey	Formerly Spilsby Rural District
Little Steeping	East Lindsey	Formerly Spilsby Rural District
Markby	East Lindsey	Formerly Spilsby Rural District
Mavis Enderby	East Lindsey	Formerly Spilsby Rural District
Midville	East Lindsey	Formerly Spilsby Rural District
Mumby	East Lindsey	Formerly Spilsby Rural District
New Leake	East Lindsey	Formerly Spilsby Rural District
Orby	East Lindsey	Formerly Spilsby Rural District
Partney	East Lindsey	Formerly Spilsby Rural District
Raithby	East Lindsey	Formerly Spilsby Rural District
Rigsby with Ailby	East Lindsey	Formerly Spilsby Rural District
Sausthorpe	East Lindsey	Formerly Spilsby Rural District
Sibsey	East Lindsey	Formerly Spilsby Rural District
Skendleby	East Lindsey	Formerly Spilsby Rural District
South Ormsby cum Ketsby	East Lindsey	Formerly Spilsby Rural District
South Thoresby	East Lindsey	Formerly Spilsby Rural District
Spilsby (town)	East Lindsey	Formerly Spilsby Rural District
Stickford	East Lindsey	Formerly Spilsby Rural District
Stickney	East Lindsey	Formerly Spilsby Rural District
Thornton le Fen	East Lindsey	Formerly Spilsby Rural District
Thorpe St Peter	East Lindsey	Formerly Spilsby Rural District
Toynton All Saints	East Lindsey	Formerly Spilsby Rural District
Toynton St Peter	East Lindsey	Formerly Spilsby Rural District
Ulceby with Fordington	East Lindsey	Formerly Spilsby Rural District
Wainfleet All Saints (town)	East Lindsey	Formerly Spilsby Rural District
Wainfleet St Mary	East Lindsey	Formerly Spilsby Rural District
Well	East Lindsey	Formerly Spilsby Rural District
Welton le Marsh	East Lindsey	Formerly Spilsby Rural District
West Fen	East Lindsey	Formerly Spilsby Rural District
West Keal	East Lindsey	Formerly Spilsby Rural District
Willoughby with Sloothby	East Lindsey	Formerly Spilsby Rural District
Stamford (town)	South Kesteven	Formerly Stamford Municipal Borough
Aisthorpe	West Lindsey	Formerly Welton Rural District
Apley	West Lindsey	Formerly Welton Rural District
Bardney	West Lindsey	Formerly Welton Rural District
Barlings	West Lindsey	Formerly Welton Rural District
Brattleby	West Lindsey	Formerly Welton Rural District
Broxholme	West Lindsey	Formerly Welton Rural District
Bullington	West Lindsey	Formerly Welton Rural District
Burton	West Lindsey	Formerly Welton Rural District
Caenby	West Lindsey	Formerly Welton Rural District
Cammeringham	West Lindsey	Formerly Welton Rural District
Cherry Willingham	West Lindsey	Formerly Welton Rural District
Cold Hanworth	West Lindsey	Formerly Welton Rural District
Dunholme	West Lindsey	Formerly Welton Rural District
Faldingworth	West Lindsey	Formerly Welton Rural District
Fiskerton	West Lindsey	Formerly Welton Rural District
Friesthorpe	West Lindsey	Formerly Welton Rural District
Fulnetby	West Lindsey	Formerly Welton Rural District
Goltho	West Lindsey	Formerly Welton Rural District
Grange de Lings	West Lindsey	Formerly Welton Rural District
Greetwell	West Lindsey	Formerly Welton Rural District
Hackthorn	West Lindsey	Formerly Welton Rural District
Holton cum Beckering	West Lindsey	Formerly Welton Rural District
Ingham	West Lindsey	Formerly Welton Rural District
Nettleham	West Lindsey	Formerly Welton Rural District
Newball	West Lindsey	Formerly Welton Rural District
Normanby by Spital	West Lindsey	Formerly Welton Rural District
North Carlton	West Lindsey	Formerly Welton Rural District
Owmby-by-Spital	West Lindsey	Formerly Welton Rural District
Rand	West Lindsey	Formerly Welton Rural District
Reepham	West Lindsey	Formerly Welton Rural District
Riseholme	West Lindsey	Formerly Welton Rural District
Saxby	West Lindsey	Formerly Welton Rural District
Saxilby with Ingleby	West Lindsey	Formerly Welton Rural District
Scampton	West Lindsey	Formerly Welton Rural District
Scothern	West Lindsey	Formerly Welton Rural District
Snarford	West Lindsey	Formerly Welton Rural District
Snelland	West Lindsey	Formerly Welton Rural District
South Carlton	West Lindsey	Formerly Welton Rural District
Spridlington	West Lindsey	Formerly Welton Rural District
Stainfield	West Lindsey	Formerly Welton Rural District
Stainton by Langworth	West Lindsey	Formerly Welton Rural District
Sudbrooke	West Lindsey	Formerly Welton Rural District
Thorpe in the Fallows	West Lindsey	Formerly Welton Rural District
Welton	West Lindsey	Formerly Welton Rural District
West Firsby	West Lindsey	Formerly Welton Rural District
Wickenby	West Lindsey	Formerly Welton Rural District
Allington	South Kesteven	Formerly West Kesteven Rural District
Ancaster	South Kesteven	Formerly West Kesteven Rural District
Barkston	South Kesteven	Formerly West Kesteven Rural District
Barrowby	South Kesteven	Formerly West Kesteven Rural District
Belton and Manthorpe	South Kesteven	Formerly West Kesteven Rural District
Bitchfield and Bassingthorpe	South Kesteven	Formerly West Kesteven Rural District
Boothby Pagnell	South Kesteven	Formerly West Kesteven Rural District
Braceby and Sapperton	South Kesteven	Formerly West Kesteven Rural District
Burton Coggles	South Kesteven	Formerly West Kesteven Rural District
Carlton Scroop	South Kesteven	Formerly West Kesteven Rural District
Caythorpe	South Kesteven	Formerly West Kesteven Rural District
Claypole	South Kesteven	Formerly West Kesteven Rural District
Colsterworth	South Kesteven	Formerly West Kesteven Rural District
Denton	South Kesteven	Formerly West Kesteven Rural District
Easton	South Kesteven	Formerly West Kesteven Rural District
Fenton	South Kesteven	Formerly West Kesteven Rural District
Foston	South Kesteven	Formerly West Kesteven Rural District
Fulbeck	South Kesteven	Formerly West Kesteven Rural District
Great Gonerby	South Kesteven	Formerly West Kesteven Rural District
Great Ponton	South Kesteven	Formerly West Kesteven Rural District
Gunby and Stainby	South Kesteven	Formerly West Kesteven Rural District
Harlaxton	South Kesteven	Formerly West Kesteven Rural District
Heydour	South Kesteven	Formerly West Kesteven Rural District
Honington	South Kesteven	Formerly West Kesteven Rural District
Hough-on-the-Hill	South Kesteven	Formerly West Kesteven Rural District
Hougham	South Kesteven	Formerly West Kesteven Rural District
Ingoldsby	South Kesteven	Formerly West Kesteven Rural District
Lenton, Keisby and Osgodby	South Kesteven	Formerly West Kesteven Rural District
Little Ponton and Stroxton	South Kesteven	Formerly West Kesteven Rural District
Londonthorpe and Harrowby Without	South Kesteven	Formerly West Kesteven Rural District
Long Bennington	South Kesteven	Formerly West Kesteven Rural District
Marston	South Kesteven	Formerly West Kesteven Rural District
Normanton	South Kesteven	Formerly West Kesteven Rural District
North Witham	South Kesteven	Formerly West Kesteven Rural District
Old Somerby	South Kesteven	Formerly West Kesteven Rural District
Pickworth	South Kesteven	Formerly West Kesteven Rural District
Ropsley and Humby	South Kesteven	Formerly West Kesteven Rural District
Sedgebrook	South Kesteven	Formerly West Kesteven Rural District
Skillington	South Kesteven	Formerly West Kesteven Rural District
South Witham	South Kesteven	Formerly West Kesteven Rural District
Stoke Rochford	South Kesteven	Formerly West Kesteven Rural District
Stubton	South Kesteven	Formerly West Kesteven Rural District
Syston	South Kesteven	Formerly West Kesteven Rural District
Welby	South Kesteven	Formerly West Kesteven Rural District
Westborough and Dry Doddington	South Kesteven	Formerly West Kesteven Rural District
Woolsthorpe by Belvoir	South Kesteven	Formerly West Kesteven Rural District
Wyville cum Hungerton	South Kesteven	Formerly West Kesteven Rural District

== Sources ==
1. Formerly Alford Urban District
2. Formerly Barton upon Humber Urban District
3. Formerly Boston Municipal Borough
4. Formerly Boston Rural District
5. Formerly Bourne Urban District
6. Formerly Brigg Urban District
7. Formerly Caistor Rural District
8. Formerly Cleethorpes Municipal Borough
9. Formerly East Elloe Rural District
10. Formerly East Kesteven Rural District
11. Formerly Gainsborough Rural District
12. Formerly Gainsborough Urban District
13. Formerly Glanford Brigg Rural District
14. Formerly Goole Rural District
15. Formerly Grantham Municipal Borough
16. Formerly Grimsby County Borough
17. Formerly Grimsby Rural District
18. Formerly Horncastle Rural District
19. Formerly Horncastle Urban District
20. Formerly Isle of Axholme Rural District
21. Formerly Lincoln County Borough
22. Formerly Louth Municipal Borough
23. Formerly Louth Rural District
24. Formerly Mablethorpe and Sutton Urban District
25. Formerly Market Rasen Urban District
26. Formerly Newark Rural District
27. Formerly North Kesteven Rural District
28. Formerly Scunthorpe Municipal Borough
29. Formerly Skegness Urban District
30. Formerly Sleaford Urban District
31. Formerly South Kesteven Rural District
32. Formerly Spalding Rural District
33. Formerly Spalding Urban District
34. Formerly Spilsby Rural District
35. Formerly Stamford Municipal Borough
36. Formerly Welton Rural District
37. Formerly West Kesteven Rural District
38. Formerly Woodhall Spa Urban District

== See also ==
- List of civil parishes in England
