= Spilsby Rural District =

Former local government area in the UK

Coordinates: 53.17°N 0.10°E

Spilsby
- Spilsby Rural District shown within Parts of Lindsey in 1970.
- Area
  - 1901: 128,211 acres (518.9 km^{2})
  - 1961: 145,660 acres (589.5 km^{2})
- Population
  - 1901: 20,506
  - 1971: 22,459
- History
  - Created: 1894
  - Abolished: 1974
  - Succeeded by: East Lindsey
- Status: Rural district
  - HQ: Spilsby

Spilsby was a rural district in Lincolnshire, parts of Lindsey from 1894 to 1974.

It was created by the Local Government Act 1894 from the Spilsby rural sanitary district. Due to growth in other areas, it was reduced three times: in 1896 when Alford was constituted an urban district; in 1925 when the civil parish of Sutton in the Marsh became part of Mablethorpe and Sutton Urban District; and in 1926, when the neighbouring Skegness Urban District was extended. In 1936 a County Review Order enlarged the district when it absorbed the former Sibsey Rural District.

It survived until 1974. Under the Local Government Act 1972, it was merged with other districts to form the new East Lindsey district.

== Civil parishes ==
The rural district contained the following civil parishes:

- Addlethorpe
- Alford until 1896, when it was constituted a separate urban district.
- Anderby
- Ashby by Partney
- Aswardby
- Bilsby
- Bolingbroke
- Bratoft
- Brinkhill
- Burgh le Marsh
- Calceby
- Carrington (from 1936)
- Chapel St Leonards (from 1896: formed from part of Mumby CP)
- Claxby
- Croft
- Cumberworth
- Dalby
- Driby
- East Keal
- East Kirkby
- Eastville
- Farlesthorpe
- Frisby
- Friskney
- Frithville (from 1936)
- Great Steeping
- Gunby
- Hagnaby
- Halton
- Holegate
- Hareby
- Harrington
- Hogsthorpe
- Hundleby
- Huttoft
- Ingoldmells
- Irby in the Marsh
- Langriville (from 1936)
- Langton by Spilsby
- Little Steeping
- Markby
- Mavis Enderby
- Midville
- Mumby
- New Leake
- Orby
- Partney
- Raithby
- Rigsby with Ailsby
- Sausthorpe
- Scremby
- Sibsey (from 1936)
- Skendleby
- South Ormsby cum Ketsby
- Spilsby
- Stickford
- Stickney
- Sutterby (until 1936: absorbed by Langton by Spilsby CP)
- Sutton in the Marsh (until 1925: became part of Mablethorpe and Sutton Urban District)
- Thornton le Veal (from 1936)
- Thorpe St Peter
- Toynton All Saints
- Toynton St Peter
- Ulceby with Fordington
- Wainfleet All Saints
- Wainfleet St Mary
- Welton le Marsh
- West Fen
- West Keal
- Westville (from 1936)
- Willoughby with Sloothby
- Winthorpe (until 1926: absorbed by Addlesthorpe CP and Skegness Urban District)
