= Toynton =

Toynton may refer to:

== Places ==
- High Toynton, a village and civil parish in the East Lindsey district of Lincolnshire, England
- Low Toynton, a hamlet and civil parish in the East Lindsey district of Lincolnshire, England
- Toynton All Saints, a village and civil parish in the East Lindsey district of Lincolnshire, England
- Toynton Fen Side, a hamlet and linear settlement on Fenside Road in the East Lindsey district of Lincolnshire, England
- Toynton St Peter, a village and civil parish in the East Lindsey district of Lincolnshire, England

== People ==
- Ian Toynton (born 1946), British-American television director, producer and editor
- Norman Toynton (1939–2025), British abstract painter
