= Sibsey Rural District =

Former local government area in the UK

Coordinates: 53.05°N 0.06°W

Sibsey was a rural district in Lincolnshire, Parts of Lindsey from 1894 to 1936. It was formed in 1894 from that part of the Boston rural sanitary district which in Lindsey (the Holland part forming the Boston Rural District). It included the parishes of Sibsey, Carrington, Frithville, Langriville, Seven Acres, Thornton le Fen, and Westville. The district was abolished in 1936 under a County Review Order. The bulk became part of Spilsby Rural District with part of a couple of parishes going to Boston Rural District.
