= Ulceby =

Ulceby is the name of two villages in England:

- Ulceby, East Lindsey, Lincolnshire, and the hamlet of Ulceby Cross
  - Ulceby with Fordington civil parish
- Ulceby, North Lincolnshire
  - Ulceby railway station

== See also ==
- Ulceby Skitter
