= List of road junctions in the United Kingdom: U-V =

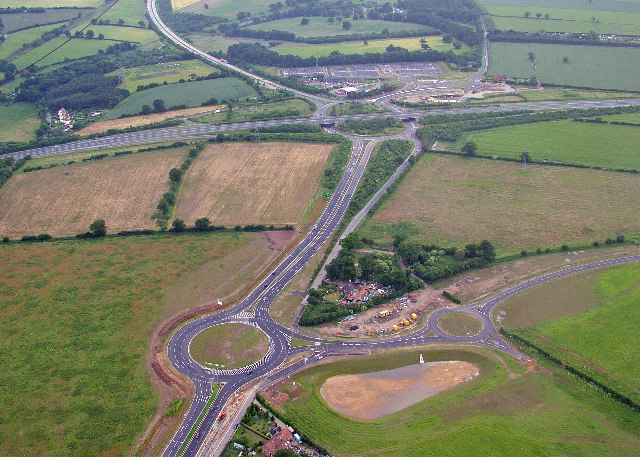
Thickthorn Interchange

This is part of the list of road junctions in the United Kingdom.

Many road junctions are named after pubs. For more information regarding the derivation of pub names see pub names.

== U ==
Junction Name	Type	Location	Roads	Grid Reference	Notes
Ulceby Cross		Ulceby, Lincolnshire	A16; A16 Bluestone Heath Road; A1028 Bluestone Heath Road; A1104	TF412737	
Umberslade Interchange	Grade Separated Fork Interchange	Hockley Heath, West Midlands	M42 J3a; M40	SP131723	
University Roundabout		Kents Hill, Milton Keynes	V10 Brickhill Street; Hammerwood Gate	52°01′30″N 0°42′16″W	

== V ==
Junction Name	Type	Location	Roads	Grid Reference	Notes
Vauxhall Cross		Vauxhall, LB Lambeth	A202; A203; A3024; A3036	51°29′10″N 0°07′26″W	
Venland Cross	Crossroads	near Liskeard, Cornwall	unclass.; unclass.	SX257679	
Vernigo Cross	Crossroads	St Mellion, Cornwall	unclass.; unclass.	SX386667	
Vickers Roundabout	Roundabout	Swindon, Wiltshire	A361 Highworth Road; unclass.	SU184896	Accesses South Marston Park ind. est.
Victoria House Roundabout		Hadleigh, Essex	A13; A129; B1014	TQ803875	
Victoria Interchange		Victoria, Cornwall	A30; unclass. (former A30)	SW997624	
Victoria Park Interchange		Glasgow	A739; A814	NS544669	
Victory Roundabout		Worle, North Somerset	B3440 Bristol Road; B3440 New Bristol Road; Commercial Way; Paddock Park	51°21′36.38″N 2°54′33.74″W	
