= Scampton =

Village and civil parish in Lincolnshire, England

Coordinates: 53.3022°N 0.5767°W

- Village and civil parish
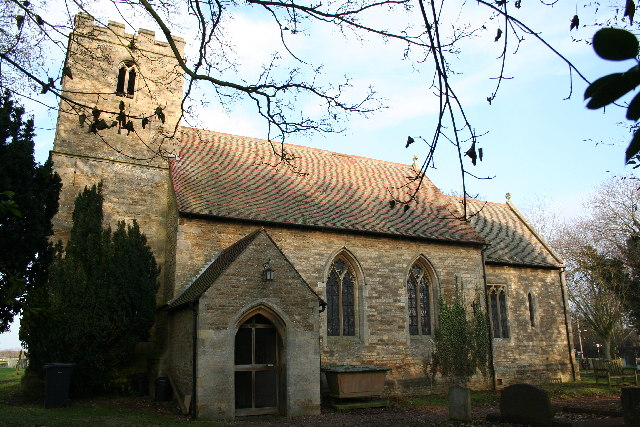
- Church of St John the Baptist, Scampton

- Location within Lincolnshire
- Population: 1,358 (2011)
- OS grid reference: SK949793
  - London: 130 mi (210 km) S
- Civil parish: Scampton
- District: West Lindsey
- Shire county: Lincolnshire
- Region: East Midlands
- Country: England
- Sovereign state: United Kingdom
- Post town: Lincoln
- Postcode district: LN1
- Police: Lincolnshire
- Fire: Lincolnshire
- Ambulance: East Midlands
- UK Parliament: Gainsborough

Scampton is a village and civil parish in the West Lindsey district of Lincolnshire, England. The population of the civil parish including Brampton and Broadholme at the 2011 census was 1,358. It is situated 5 mi (8 km) north of Lincoln, 10 mi (16 km) south-east of Gainsborough, and immediately west of the A15.

== Geography ==
In the civil parish, between the village and the A15, is RAF Scampton, to which the parish lends its name. The airfield first opened in 1916 as Home Defence Flight Station Brattleby, becoming Scampton the following year, and then closing in 1919; it re-opened in 1936 as RAF Scampton.

== History ==
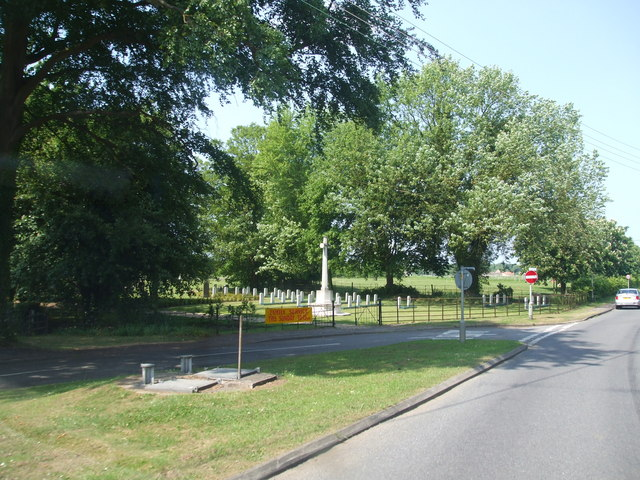
Scampton churchyard at St John's

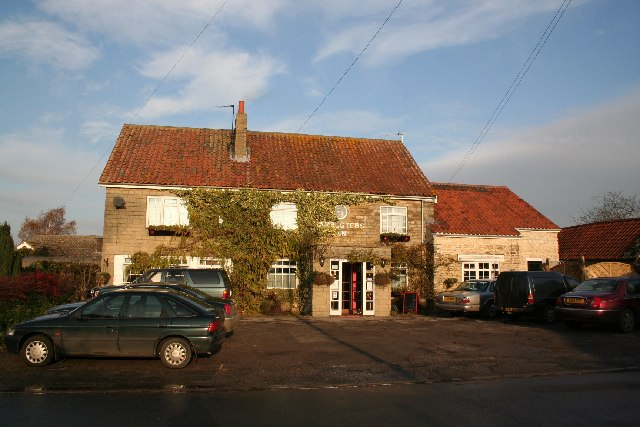
Dambusters Inn

Scampton church dedicated to St John the Baptist is mainly from the 18th century, with parts from the 17th century. Many war dead are buried in its churchyard, including 64 British Commonwealth personnel, eight German Luftwaffe airmen, and a further 43 personnel who died on active service. Commonwealth airmen include those who flew from RAF Scampton with the Royal Air Force, Royal Canadian Air Force, Royal Australian Air Force, and Royal New Zealand Air Force. In the early months of the war, a plot of land lying to the right of the church entrance was set aside for the burial of servicemen, but by 1941, it became necessary to reserve further ground in an extension of the churchyard north of the church. This is why the war graves are in two sections, linked by a footpath. Every year, Scampton Church receives hundreds of visitors.

The eight German graves are from two Junkers Ju 88 crews that crashed in Scampton.

The first group was Junkers Ju 88 No. 5168 Bomber Training Wing 4 from Greifswald, Germany, loaded with 50 kg of bombs, 23 kg of which was found in the wreckage. This plane was on a mission to bomb RAF Hemswell, about 11 km (7 mi) directly north of Scampton, but was picked up on radar, tracked, and shot down by RAF Scampton ground defences at 1:35 am on 12 May 1941. The tail was seen to break off as the plane burst into flames and dived into the ground. The wreckage hit the land belonging to a farmer, Mr Miller. He and his wife were quick to arrive at the site when they heard the explosion, with the pilot Lieutenant Kurt Hanning dying in the arms of Mrs Miller, after all three others of the four-man crew had been killed in the crash.

However, the discovery of a fifth body five days later by Mr Miller spawned several local conspiracy theories, including that of a top secret spy mission, and that the pilot had given his girlfriend a joy ride over England. In reality, it was discovered that a ground crewman, E H Reidel, took an illegal joy ride when he was reported AWOL from his base the next day. This is the reason for two of the German names sharing a gravestone.

The second Ju 88 of Nachtjagdgeschwader 5 met its end on 4 March 1945, known as the 'night of the intruders'. As part of Operation Gisela, a force of 200 Ju 88s of the Luftwaffe Night Fighter Destroyer Group flew at wave top height, making landfall at around midnight between the Thames estuary and North Yorkshire, undetected by radar. They targeted the 450 heavy bombers of RAF Bomber Command returning from a raid on the synthetic oil plants at Kamen, in the Ruhr, and the Dortmund-Ems Canal.

This Ju 88, piloted by 25-year-old Sgt Heinrich Conze, started the night well by intercepting a Lancaster over Langworth and shooting it down. He then proceeded to look for other targets, getting away from Langworth, knowing RAF Mosquito night fighters could now be on their way. Over Hackthorn Road in nearby Welton, he spotted a car's headlights, even though they were hooded, and dived to strafe it. Not realising that there were telegraph poles and wires at the side of the road, the plane hit them and then collided with the car, throwing it two fields over. The car driver and the crew of the plane were killed instantly at around 1:45 am on 4 March. They joined at least 24 bombers that had been shot down, and a further 20 damaged, within just two hours of the raid's beginning.

The car driver, Observer Jack P Kelway, was on duty when he was killed, making him the only member of the Royal Observer Corps to be killed on active service, later buried at Newport Cemetery in Lincoln.

In town, the Dambusters Inn on High Street contains RAF and Second World War memorabilia.

== Education ==
The village school is the modest Scampton Church of England Primary School which was opened in 1876 by the Church of England to serve the children of the local area whatever their background and needs. Nowadays, most of the 62 current four-to-eleven-year-old pupils do not live in the town. The school also runs a blog on their website, and their motto is "The Best for Every Child". The most recent Ofsted inspection on 16 July 2021 affirmed that it continued to be a good school.

Prince Philip, Duke of Edinburgh visited the primary school, flying into the airfield, later visiting Whisby on Monday 26 March 2001.

== Climate ==
Scampton

Climate chart (precipitation, max. and min. temperature)
J	F	M	A	M	J	J	A	S	O	N	D
49 7 1	39 8 1	36 10 2	45 13 4	46 16 7	65 19 10	59 22 12	57 21 12	53 18 10	58 14 7	60 10 4	54 7 1
- █ Average max. and min. temperatures in °C
- █ Precipitation totals in mm
- Source: Met Office
Imperial conversion
J	F	M	A	M	J	J	A	S	O	N	D
1.9 44 34	1.5 46 34	1.4 50 36	1.8 56 39	1.8 61 45	2.6 66 50	2.3 71 54	2.3 71 54	2.1 65 50	2.3 57 45	2.4 50 38	2.1 45 34
- █ Average max. and min. temperatures in °F
- █ Precipitation totals in inches

As with the rest of the British Isles, Scampton has a temperate oceanic climate (Köppen: Cfb) with cool summers and mild winters. The nearest official Met Office weather station for which online records are available is at RAF Scampton, less than 5 km (3 mi) to the south of the town centre.

In a typical year, the warmest day should reach a high temperature of at least 21.62 °C (70.92 °F), whereas the coldest day should always reach a low temperature of 1.02 °C (33.84 °F).

The record high at RAF Scampton peaked at 39.9 °C (103.8 °F) in the afternoon of 19 July 2022 during the 2022 United Kingdom heat wave, beating not only the previous local record of 35.1 °C (95.2 °F) from a three-day heatwave on 26 July 2019, but also the former national record of 38.7 °C (101.7 °F) also from July 2019.

The absolute minimum temperature of −15.6 °C (3.9 °F) was recorded on 7 December 2010 at RAF Scampton, during the record-breaking winter of 2010–11 in Great Britain and Ireland. A former nearby weather station holds the record for the lowest daytime maximum temperature recorded in England in the month of December at −9.0 °C (15.8 °F) on 17 December 1981. In a year, 48.98 nights should register an air frost.

The length of the day varies extremely over the course of the year in Scampton. The shortest day may have 7 hours and 30 minutes of daylight, and the longest as much as 10 hours more, with 17 hours of daylight. The earliest sunrise is at around 4:30 am in June, and the latest sunrise is 4 hours later at 8:30 am in December. The earliest sunset is at 3:30 pm in December, and the latest is 6 hours later at 9:30 pm in June. Daylight saving time (DST) is observed in Scampton, starting in the spring, lasting about 7 months, and ending in the autumn.

Winters are generally cool with little temperature variation. Heavy snow is rare, but snow usually falls at least once each winter. Spring and autumn can be pleasant.

Climate data for RAF Scampton, elevation: 57 m (187 ft), 1991–2020 normals
Month	Jan	Feb	Mar	Apr	May	Jun	Jul	Aug	Sep	Oct	Nov	Dec	Year
Mean daily maximum °C (°F)	6.86 (44.35)	7.74 (45.93)	10.24 (50.43)	13.19 (55.74)	16.22 (61.20)	19.10 (66.38)	21.62 (70.92)	21.42 (70.56)	18.37 (65.07)	14.11 (57.40)	9.79 (49.62)	7.02 (44.64)	13.84 (56.91)
Mean daily minimum °C (°F)	1.05 (33.89)	1.02 (33.84)	2.26 (36.07)	4.11 (39.40)	6.97 (44.55)	9.95 (49.91)	12.05 (53.69)	11.96 (53.53)	9.82 (49.68)	7.04 (44.67)	3.55 (38.39)	1.12 (34.02)	5.93 (42.67)
Average rainfall mm (inches)	48.91 (1.93)	38.62 (1.52)	35.87 (1.41)	44.54 (1.75)	45.80 (1.80)	64.96 (2.56)	58.79 (2.31)	57.38 (2.26)	52.96 (2.09)	58.15 (2.29)	59.90 (2.36)	53.52 (2.11)	619.40 (24.39)
Average precipitation days	8.7	6.8	7.3	6.7	7.6	7.8	7.3	7.9	7.2	8.6	8.4	8.6	92.9
Average rainy days (≥ 1.0 mm)	10.63	9.49	8.79	8.97	8.90	9.61	9.58	9.38	9.44	10.41	11.86	11.04	118.10
Mean daily daylight hours	8.2	9.9	12.0	14.1	15.9	16.9	16.4	14.7	12.6	10.5	8.6	7.6	12.3
Source 1: Met Office
Source 2: Weather Spark (daylight hours and precipitation days), World Weather Online
