= Toynton Fen Side =

Hamlet and linear settlement in Lincolnshire, England

Coordinates: 53.1374°N 0.0851°E

Toynton Fenside
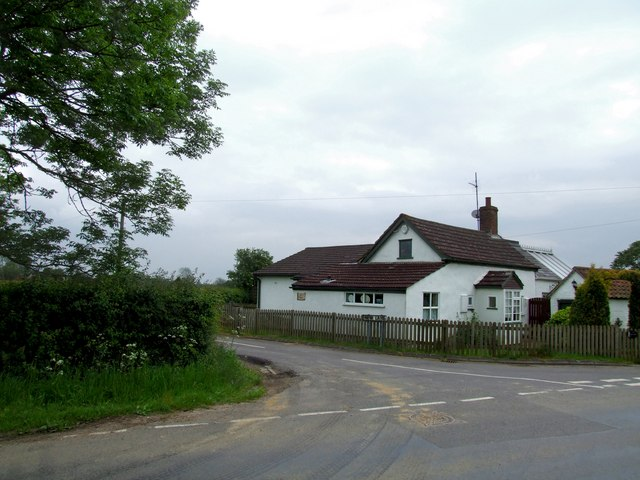
- New Lane

- Location within Lincolnshire
- OS grid reference: TF395620
  - London: 115 mi (185 km) S
- District: East Lindsey
- Shire county: Lincolnshire
- Region: East Midlands
- Country: England
- Sovereign state: United Kingdom
- Post town: SPILSBY
- Postcode district: PE23
- Police: Lincolnshire
- Fire: Lincolnshire
- Ambulance: East Midlands
- UK Parliament: Louth and Horncastle

Toynton Fen Side is a hamlet and linear settlement on Fenside Road in the East Lindsey district of Lincolnshire, England. The hamlet is partly in the civil parish of Toynton St Peter, and that of Toynton All Saints. Toynton Fen Side is situated 12 miles (19 km) north from Boston and 11 miles (18 km) west from Skegness. The East Fen Catchwater Drain crosses west to east at the south of the hamlet. Bus services connect Toynton Fen Side with Horncastle, Partney, Wainfleet, Boston, Mablethorpe, and Spilsby.

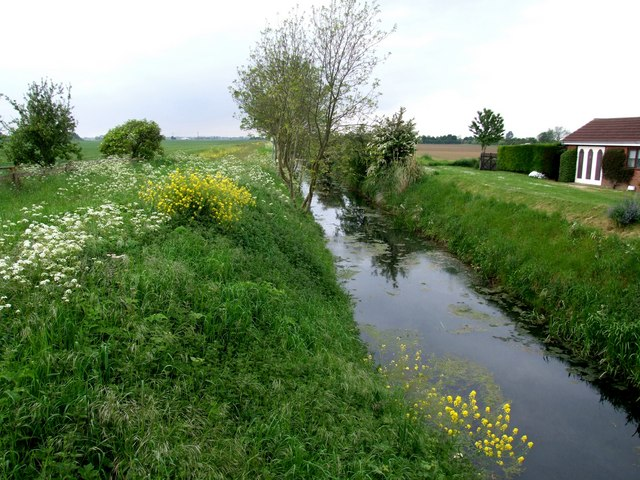
East Fen Catchwater Drain, Toynton Fen Side

According to trade directories Toynton Fen Side is a centre for growing wheat, barley, potatoes and beans, and has rich pasture land. Other businesses include garage services and a fencing suppliers.

== History ==
The settlement was historically under the lordship of the Willoughby de Eresby Barony; in 1855, Peter Drummond-Burrell; in 1885, Clementina Drummond-Willoughby. There was a publican of The Wheatsheaf public house in 1855. A farmer and a publican was mentioned in 1872, where the publican was also a grocer. In 1933 there were two farmers, a smallholder, and a shopkeeper.

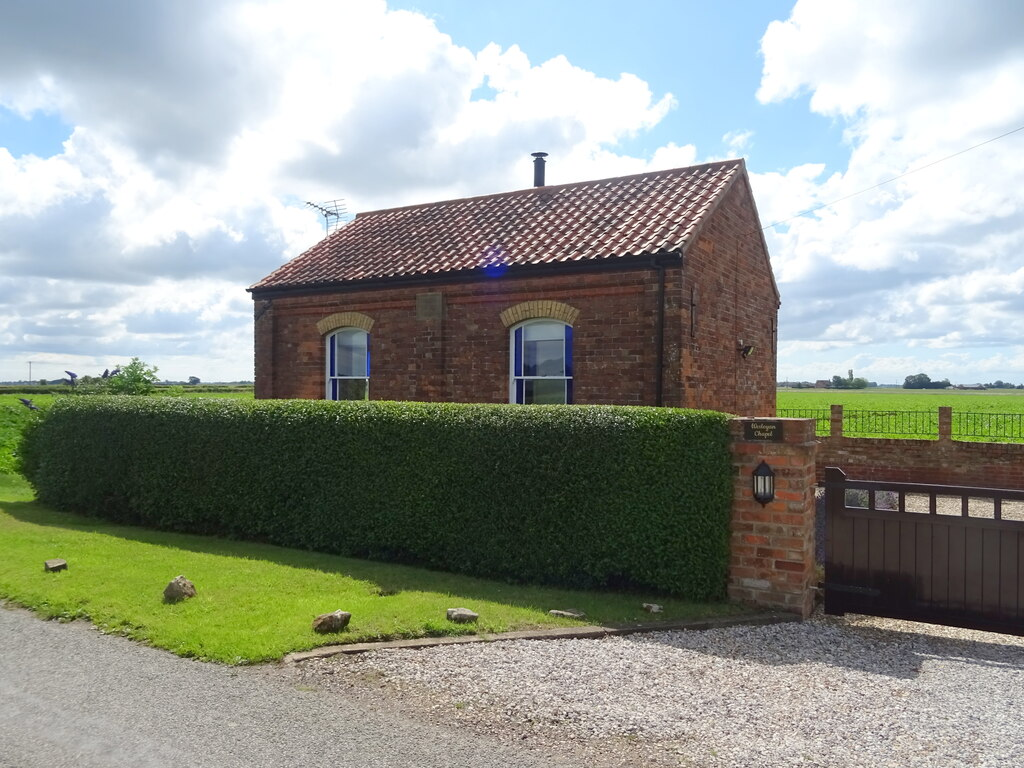
Former Wesleyan Methodist Chapel

There was a Primitive Methodist Chapel, dating to 1867, in the Toynton All Saints part of the hamlet. The chapel was variously in the Louth, Spilsby, and Leake Circuits.
