= Aston Sandford =

Village in Buckinghamshire, England

Coordinates: 51.764°N 0.905°W

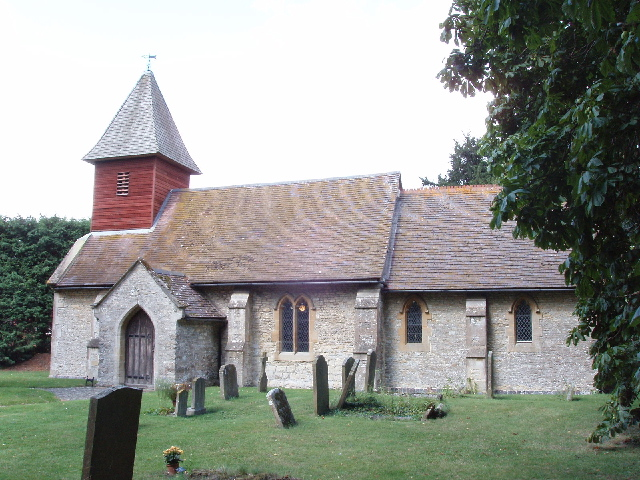
- St Michael and All Angels parish church

- Location within Buckinghamshire
- Population: 43 (Mid-2010 pop est)
- OS grid reference: SP7507
- Civil parish: Aston Sandford
- Unitary authority: Buckinghamshire
- Ceremonial county: Buckinghamshire
- Region: South East
- Country: England
- Sovereign state: United Kingdom
- Post town: Aylesbury
- Postcode district: HP17
- Dialling code: 01296
- Police: Thames Valley
- Fire: Buckinghamshire
- Ambulance: South Central
- UK Parliament: Mid Buckinghamshire

Aston Sandford is a small village and civil parish in Buckinghamshire, England, about 1 mile (1.6 km) east of Haddenham and 4 miles (6.4 km) northwest of Princes Risborough. It is in the civil parish of Kingsey within the Buckinghamshire Council unitary authority area.

The "Aston" part of the toponym is derived from the Old English for "Eastern Estate". At the time of the Domesday Book in 1086 the village was known as Cold Aston, and both it and Haddenham were owned by the same manor, suggesting that Aston got its name from being the farming estate to the east of Haddenham. The owner of both places in 1086 was listed as Manno the Breton.

By 1199 the estate had been annexed by the Norman rulers and was placed into the extensive estates belonging to the heirs of Odo, Bishop of Bayeux: the Sandfords. It was from this time that the village became known as Aston Sandford.

The Church of England parish church of Saint Michael and All Angels is one of the smallest in England. The nave is probably 12th century and the chancel is probably 13th century. The chancel arch is also 13th century. The northeast window and blocked north doorway are probably 14th century and a buttress on the west wall is probably 15th century. However, the building was so extensively restored and reworked in 1878 that it is difficult to date any of its features with certainty.

The parish's rector from 1803 to 1821 was the biblical commentator Revd. Thomas Scott, who trained the first missionaries of the Church Missionary Society here.

== Sources ==
- Page, William, ed. (1927). Victoria County History: A History of the County of Buckingham, Volume 4. pp. 8–9.
- Pevsner, Nikolaus (1973) [1960]. The Buildings of England: Buckinghamshire. Harmondsworth: Penguin Books. p. 53. ISBN 0-14-071019-1.
