= Thomas Scott (commentator) =

English preacher and author (1747–1821)

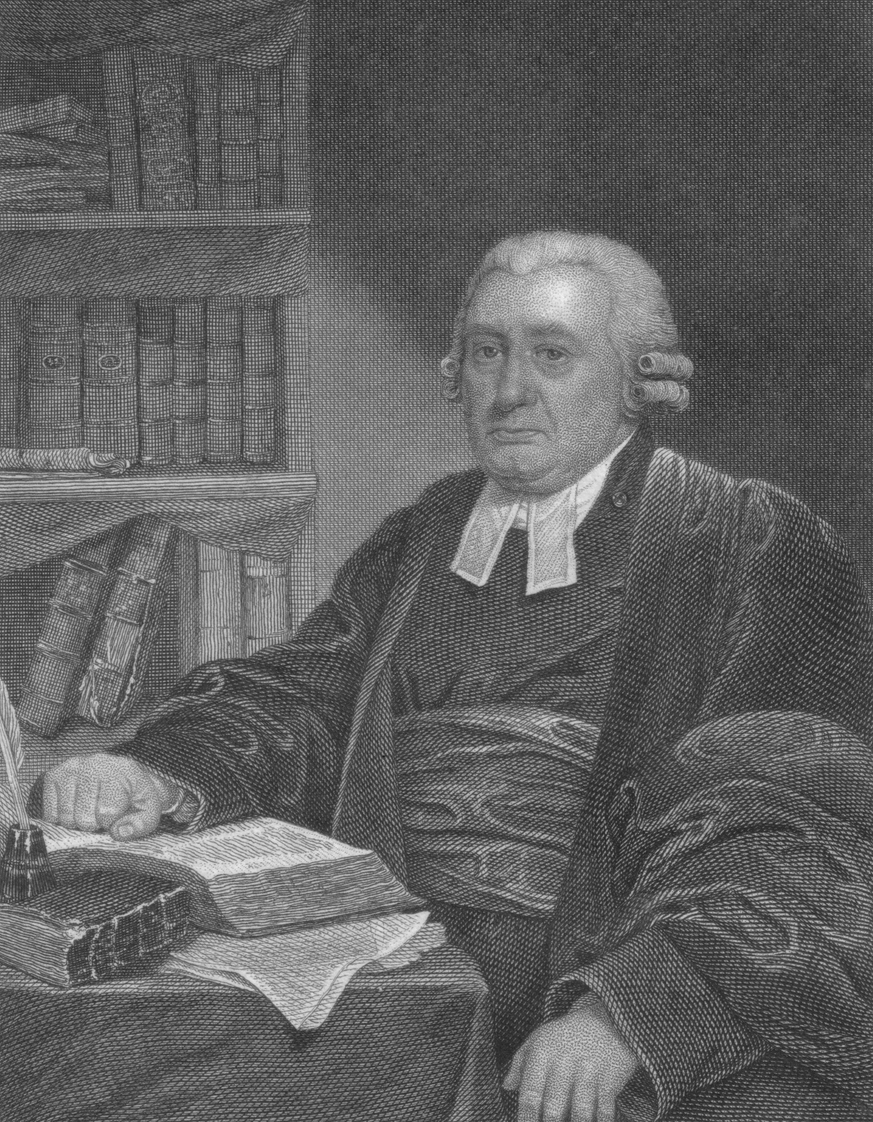
Thomas Scott

Thomas Scott (1747–1821) was an influential English preacher and author. He is principally known for his widespread work A Commentary On The Whole Bible, for The Force of Truth, and as one of the founders of the Church Missionary Society.

== Life ==
Thomas Scott was born in 1747 at Bratoft in Lincolnshire, the son of a grazier (cattle farmer), the 11th of 13 children. His mother was better educated than his father and taught Thomas to read. He went to various small local private schools before being sent at the age of ten to a school in Scorton in Richmondshire, 150 miles away from home. Returning in 1762, he was apprenticed at 15 to a surgeon in nearby Alford, but was soon dismissed for bad conduct. He returned to the family farm in disgrace and he was reduced to working as a labourer for his father, enduring this for ten years before finally leaving home in 1772 to become ordained as an Anglican priest at the age of 25. As he afterwards admitted, he went into the ministry for a comfortable career, and did not believe in most of the doctrine he was required to preach.

He was admitted to Clare College, Cambridge in 1773, as a ten-year man.

Scott was first a curate in Buckinghamshire in 1772, and was appointed to the adjacent parishes of Stoke Goldington and Weston Underwood. In December 1774 he married Jane Kell, housekeeper to a local family. From 1775 to 1777 Scott served as curate of nearby Ravenstone, through an exchange with the curate there.

During that period, Scott began a friendship and correspondence with the hymn writer John Newton, who was curate of neighbouring Olney. This instigated an examination of his conscience and study of the Holy Scriptures that would convert him into an evangelical Christian, as related in his spiritual autobiography The Force of Truth published in 1779.

In 1781, Scott transferred to the curacy of Olney, Newton having gone to London, and in 1785 Scott also moved to London to take up a post as a hospital chaplain at the Lock Hospital for syphilis sufferers. He would walk 14 miles every Sunday, preaching and taking services at various churches, including St. Mildred, Bread Street, and St. Margaret, Lothbury, in addition to his work at the hospital chapel. While in London he started publishing the Commentary On the Whole Bible that was to make his name.

His wife died in 1790 and he remarried on 4 November that year to a non-conformist writer, Mary Egerton (died 1840). During his time in London, Scott was, with Newton, one of the founders of the Church Missionary Society, and its first secretary (1799–1802).

In 1803, Scott left the Lock Hospital to become Rector of Aston Sandford in Buckinghamshire, where he remained until his death in 1821. He kept up his involvement with the Church Missionary Society, taking in trainee missionaries for instruction.

== Publications ==
The Force of Truth (1779) is still available as a paperback reprint. It went through twelve editions in his lifetime.

Scott's Commentary On The Whole Bible originally appeared in 174 weekly numbers starting in January 1788, and went into multiple editions. By the time of his death in 1821 nearly £200,000 worth of copies had been sold in England and America (where it was particularly popular), but Scott made only £1,000 profit from the work, having sold the copyright in around 1810.

Scott published various other religious essays, but none was as successful as his Commentary, and by 1813 he was in debt to his publishers for £1,200. He successfully persuaded relatives to buy up unsold copies of his works at a reduced price to clear the debt.

During his lifetime his Theological Works, Published at different times, and now collected into volumes (1808) were published in five volumes.

His son John Scott published in twelve volumes The Works of the Late Rev. Thomas Scott, Rector of Aston Sandford, Bucks (1823–24). These volumes included The Force of Truth, John Scott's Life of the Rev. Thomas Scott and unpublished letters and papers, but excluded the Commentary.

John Henry Newman wrote of Scott as "the writer who made a deeper impression on my mind than any other, and to whom (humanly speaking) I almost owe my soul – Thomas Scott of Aston Sandford." He also wrote that Scott's works "show him to be a true Englishman, and I deeply felt his influence; and for years I used almost as proverbs what I considered to be the scope and issue of his doctrine, 'Holiness before peace,' and 'Growth is the only evidence of life.'"

== Descendants ==
Scott had two daughters and three sons, all three of whom went into the Anglican ministry. They were with his first wife, Jane Kell, whom he married on 5 December 1774. Jane died in 1790. Less than two months later, with a young family to look after, Scott married Mary Egerton. (Note: Mary is mentioned in the biography of Thomas Scott by his son John, but not by name, because she is still living. p 297-8) After Scott's death, Mary married astronomer William Rutter Dawes in 1824.

His eldest son John Scott (1777–1834) edited and published both his father's life and his papers after his death. He became vicar of St Mary's, Kingston upon Hull, as did his son and grandson after him, both also called John Scott. There is a pub in Hull named after them The Three John Scotts.

The middle son, Thomas Scott (1780–1835), became rector of Wappenham in Northamptonshire, where he was succeeded by his son, another Thomas Scott. He was also the father of the architect George Gilbert Scott, some of whose early works can be found in Wappenham. A 20th-century descendant of the second Thomas Scott was the radio comedian Richard Murdoch.

The third son Benjamin Scott (1788–1830) was curate to Edward Burn. He married Anne and had four children, and in 1828 became vicar of Bidford and of Priors Salford, Warwickshire. Anne died in 1829 and Benjamin married his second wife, Frances Bingley, on 12 January 1830, but shortly afterwards became ill and died while staying at the Burton Arms Inn in Llandegley, Radnorshire, Wales. Frances was pregnant at the time of his death, and their son Benjamin John Scott was born later the same year, being baptised on 4 December 1830 in their home town of Bidford-on-Avon.

His daughters were Anne, born 29 October 1775, baptised at Ravenstone, Buckinghamshire and Elizabeth, baptised 15 September 1785 at Olney, Buckinghamshire.
