= Ashby by Partney =

Hamlet in the East Lindsey district of Lincolnshire, England

Coordinates: 53.177340°N 0.13575°E

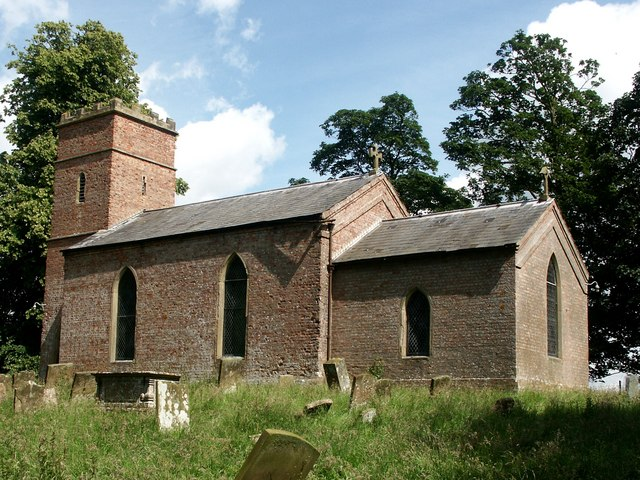
- Church of St Helen, Ashby by Partney

- Location within Lincolnshire
- OS grid reference: TF428666
  - London: 115 mi (185 km) S
- Civil parish: Ashby with Scremby
- District: East Lindsey
- Shire county: Lincolnshire
- Region: East Midlands
- Country: England
- Sovereign state: United Kingdom
- Post town: Spilsby
- Postcode district: PE23
- Police: Lincolnshire
- Fire: Lincolnshire
- Ambulance: East Midlands
- UK Parliament: Louth and Horncastle

Ashby by Partney is a village and former civil parish, now in the parish of Ashby with Scremby, in the East Lindsey district of Lincolnshire, England. It is situated to the south of the A158 road, and 2 miles (3 km) east from the town of Spilsby. It neighbours the village of Partney. In 1961 the parish had a population of 64. On 1 April 1987 the parish was abolished and merged with Scremby to form "Ashby with Scremby".

The settlement is recorded in the Domesday Book as consisting of 26 households, with Earl Hugh of Chester as Lord of the manor.

The church, dedicated to Saint Helen, was built of pale orange brick in 1841, on the site of an earlier church. C. Hodgson Fowler restored the interior in 1892, retaining the 14th-century font. It is a Grade II listed building.
