= Ashby with Scremby =

Civil parish in Lincolnshire, England

Coordinates: 53.190300°N 0.157842°E

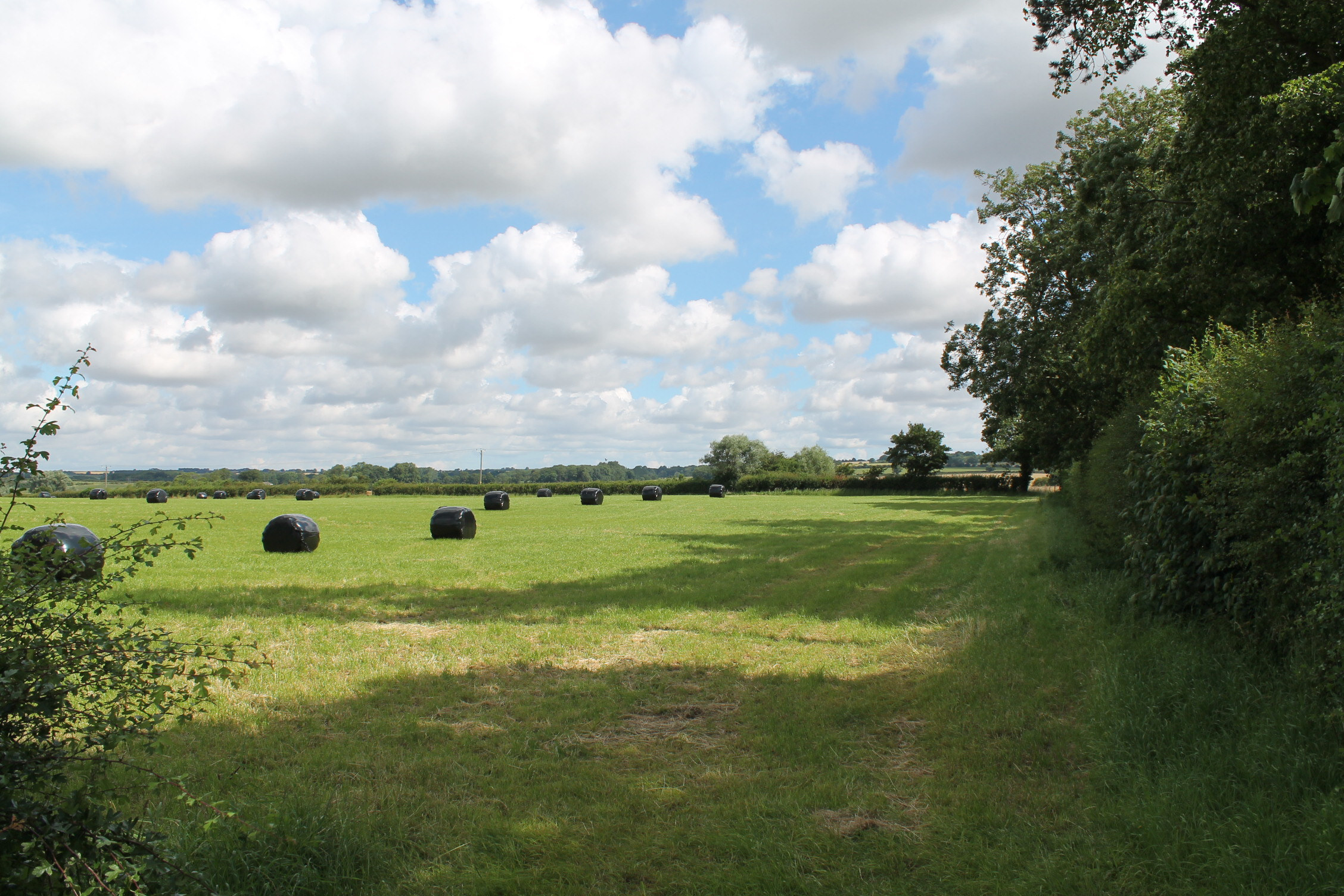
- Footpath north from Ashby Road

- Location within Lincolnshire
- Population: 179 (2011 Census)
- OS grid reference: TF442680
- Civil parish: Ashby with Scremby
- District: East Lindsey
- Shire county: Lincolnshire
- Region: East Midlands
- Country: England
- Sovereign state: United Kingdom
- Post town: Spilsby
- Postcode district: PE23
- Dialling code: 01754; 01790
- Police: Lincolnshire
- Fire: Lincolnshire
- Ambulance: East Midlands
- UK Parliament: Louth and Horncastle

Ashby with Scremby is a civil parish in the East Lindsey district of Lincolnshire, England, with a population of 147 (2001 census), increasing to 179 at the 2011 census. The parish includes the village of Scremby, along with the hamlets of Ashby by Partney and Grebby.

Rather than an elected parish council, local democracy is served by a Parish meeting.

The parish is bisected by the A158 road from Lincoln to Skegness, and the Bluestone Heath Road (A1020) forms a short part of the North-eastern parish boundary. The South-western boundary is in the valley of the Steeping River.
