= Brampton, Lincolnshire =

Hamlet and civil parish in Lincolnshire, England

Coordinates: 53°18′17″N 0°43′56″W

Brampton
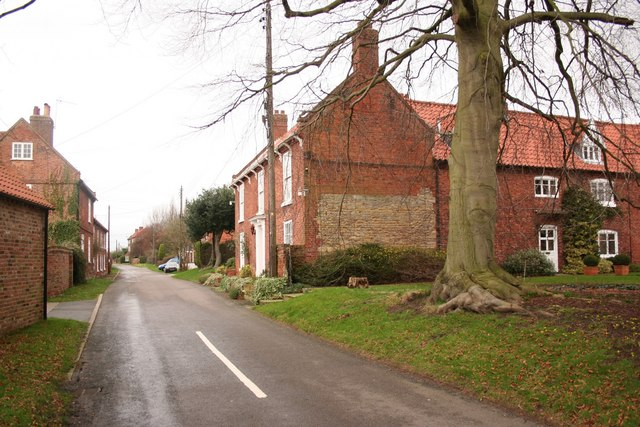
- The main street in Brampton. On the right is the grade II listed Hermitage.

- Location within Lincolnshire
- OS grid reference: SK845794
  - London: 125 mi (201 km) S
- Civil parish: Brampton
- Unitary authority: West Lindsey
- Ceremonial county: Lincolnshire
- Region: East Midlands
- Country: England
- Sovereign state: United Kingdom
- Post town: Lincoln
- Postcode district: LN1
- Police: Lincolnshire
- Fire: Lincolnshire
- Ambulance: East Midlands
- UK Parliament: Sleaford and North Hykeham

Brampton is a hamlet and civil parish in the West Lindsey district of Lincolnshire, England. It is situated approximately 9 miles (14 km) north-west from the city and county town of Lincoln and less than 1 mile (1.6 km) north-east from Torksey and Torksey Castle.
