= Roxholm =

Hamlet and civil parish in Lincolnshire, England

Coordinates: 53.037°N 0.418°W

- Civil parish
- Roxholm Hall

- Location within Lincolnshire
- Interactive map of Roxholm
- Area: 1.461 sq mi (3.78 km^{2})
- Population: 60 (2021)
  - Density: 41/sq mi (16/km^{2})
- OS grid reference: TF061502
- District: North Kesteven
- Shire county: Lincolnshire
- Region: East Midlands
- Country: England
- Sovereign state: United Kingdom
- Post town: SLEAFORD
- Postcode district: NG34
- Dialling code: 01526, 01529
- Police: Lincolnshire
- Fire: Lincolnshire
- Ambulance: East Midlands
- UK Parliament: Sleaford and North Hykeham
- Website: leasingham.parish.lincolnshire.gov.uk

Roxholm is a small hamlet and civil parish in the North Kesteven district of Lincolnshire, England. It is located 3 miles (4.8 km) north of Sleaford and 12 miles (19 km) south of Lincoln. At the 2021 census, the parish had a population of 60.

== Geography ==
Roxholm is situated on the low-lying agricultural limestone plateau of the Lincoln Cliff edge, surrounded primarily by arable farmland, native hedgerows, and linear woodland stands. The parish lies at a general elevation of approximately 24 metres (79 ft), reaching a high point of around 44 metres (144 ft) in the west of the parish. The area forms the rural western portion of the joint parish community, lacking a formally defined settlement layout. It is accessed via local minor roads linking Leasingham to Ruskington and Cranwell.

== History ==
=== Toponymy ===
The place-name "Roxholm" derives from Old Norse or Old English, recorded in early records as Roches Ham or Roxham, meaning the homestead or estate associated with a person named *Hrókr or *Hrocc.

=== Events ===
The settlement was recorded in the 1086 Domesday Book as belonging to Alfred of Lincoln and Geoffrey Alselin, recording a minimum population of 8 villeins. The original medieval village, now considered a deserted settlement, leaves faint earthwork traces representing potential late medieval crofts south of Old Hall Farm. Historical taxation and census assessments chart the community's size over time: the Diocesan Return of 1563 recorded 11 resident families, and by the 19th century, population peaked before declining in the early 20th century.

Historically, Roxholm was a township and chapelry in the ancient parish of Leasingham within the Flaxwell wapentake of the Parts of Kesteven. It became an independent civil parish under the Extra-Parochial Places Act, and although it was temporarily merged into the civil parish of Leasingham in 1931, it remains an established civil parish in modern administrative boundaries. Two pilots died during a WWII-era mid-air collision over the hamlet on December 11, 1941.

The historic centre of the settlement is Roxholm Hall, a country house dating back in parts to the 18th century with subsequent 19th-century additions. The hall and its surrounding estate historically formed the principal focus of agricultural employment in the hamlet. In the late 20th century, the hall was converted into a residential care facility.

=== Religious sites ===
Early antiquarian sources record the unlocated site of a medieval church dedicated to St John the Baptist, which was demolished during the early Reformation period.

Nonconformist worship was served by a Congregational chapel and a Wesleyan Methodist chapel constructed in 1871 by John Montague Cole of Roxholm Hall for estate workers. The red-brick Wesleyan chapel contained a main sanctuary and attached Sunday school cell; it closed in 2005, after which it was converted into a private residence.

== Governance ==
Although Roxholm is a standalone civil parish, it shares a parish council with Leasingham for administrative purposes.

For local government purposes, the parish falls within the shire district of North Kesteven and the shire county of Lincolnshire. At the district level, it forms part of the Cranwell, Leasingham & Wilsford electoral ward. At the national level, Roxholm is part of the Sleaford and North Hykeham parliamentary constituency.

== Demographics ==
At the 2021 UK census, the civil parish of Roxholm recorded a population of 60 residents.

Historical population
Year	1881	1891	1901	1911	1921	2021
Population	95	81	82	91	86	60

== Economy ==
The economy of Roxholm is predominantly agricultural, with much of the parish consisting of arable farmland. Agricultural infrastructure includes Old Hall Farm (also known as Roxholm Old Hall), a 19th-century courtyard farmstead built around a regular layout of working buildings with a detached farmhouse.

Local commercial and institutional activities include healthcare services provided at Roxholm Hall Care Centre, a specialized residential care facility located in the converted historic hall. Additionally, local light manufacturing is represented within the parish by companies such as Haborn Products Ltd, which manufactures specialized pet enclosures and kennel equipment on Roxholm Road.

== Community ==
Being substantially rural, Roxholm has few community facilities or amenities, with retail, education, and leisure accessed via surrounding villages or larger settlements such as Sleaford.

== Landmarks ==
=== Listed buildings ===
The parish contains one Grade II listed building:

- Dovecote close to Roxholm Hall: A historic dovecote located 15 metres (49 ft) northwest of Roxholm Hall on Roxholm Hall Lane. The structure is designated at Grade II for its architectural and historic significance.

=== War memorial ===
Roxholm historically shared civil and ecclesiastical ties with neighboring Leasingham, and men from Roxholm are also commemorated on the principal Leasingham War Memorial. Located on Captain's Hill at the entrance to the churchyard of the Church of St Andrew, this 15-foot (4.5 m) stone calvary cross was erected and dedicated in 1921 to honour local casualties of the First World War, with additional tablets added at its base for Second World War casualties.
