= Boston Rural District =

Former rural district in Holland, Lincolnshire, England

Coordinates: 52.95°N 0.00°E

Boston was a rural district in Holland, Lincolnshire from 1894 to 1974. It was formed from the Boston rural sanitary district by the Local Government Act 1894 and did not include the municipal borough of Boston. The part of Boston RSD which was in Lindsey formed the Sibsey Rural District. In 1974, under the Local Government Act 1972, it was merged with Boston in a new borough of Boston.
