= Leasingham =

Village and civil parish in the North Kesteven district of Lincolnshire, England

Coordinates: 53.023947°N 0.422025°W

- Civil parish
- Location within Lincolnshire
- Interactive map of Leasingham
- Area: 3.2 sq mi (8.3 km^{2})
- Population: 1,494 (2021)
  - Density: 467/sq mi (180/km^{2})
- OS grid reference: TF059485
  - London: 110 mi (180 km) S
- District: North Kesteven
- Shire county: Lincolnshire
- Region: East Midlands
- Country: England
- Sovereign state: United Kingdom
- Post town: Sleaford
- Postcode district: NG34
- Police: Lincolnshire
- Fire: Lincolnshire
- Ambulance: East Midlands
- UK Parliament: Sleaford and North Hykeham

Leasingham is a village and civil parish in the North Kesteven district of Lincolnshire, England.

== Geography ==
It is situated less than 2 miles (3 km) north from Sleaford, and just off the A15. The hamlet of Roxholm lies to the north. There are a total of 727 households as of 2021. The population of the civil parish at the 2021 census was 1,494, a reduction from the 2011 census count of 1,584.

The B1209 passes through the village to join the A153 further east, passing across Leasingham Moor. Close by to the west is RAF Cranwell. The A15 used to run through the village on Captain's Hill until the 1950s.

The A15 Bypass began construction in August 1955, to cost £30,000. It opened on Monday 30 April 1956. The autumn of 1955 had been good weather.

On Sunday August 12 1984, the daughter of John Crichton-Stuart, 6th Marquess of Bute, Caroline (21 February 1957-1984), when driving a Volkswagen Scirocco on the A15, was killed instantly by a stolen car. 18 year old unemployed Simon Goulding, of West Yorkshire, was charged at Sleaford magistrates with taking a Ford Cortina without the owner's consent in Boston. On 29 August 1984 he was charged with causing death by dangerous driving, and was refused bail. On December 10 1984, at Lincoln court, he pleaded guilty and received four and half years in youth custody. In June 1989 Mr Goulding received his driving licence back, six months early, after a judge at Lincoln court believed that he had somehow 'reformed his life'.

== History ==
Captain's Hill takes its name from the local landowner, Captain Richard Wharton-Myddleton, who had been an ensign at the battle of Waterloo. He lived in Leasingham Hall (built about 1836) now a Grade II listed house. On 4 January 2022, this hall had a renovation to transform it into 6 flats, however work could not begin initially due to safety concerns over tree preservation.

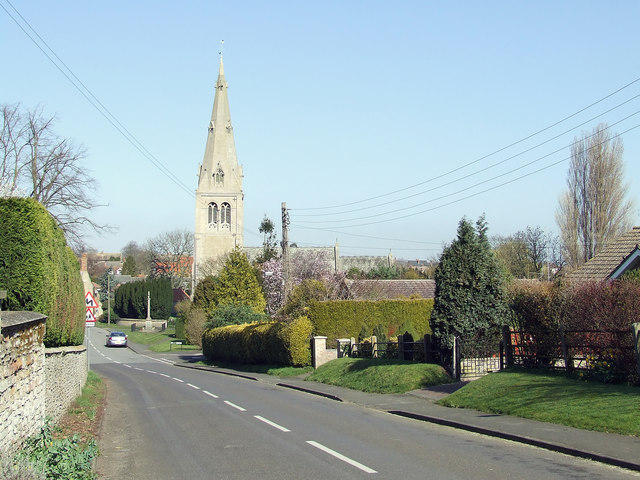
Captain's Hill, Leasingham, with St Andrew's church

Other buildings in the village include the church of St Andrews, a Wesleyan chapel, manor house, village hall and a row of alms houses. The local school is St Andrew's C.E. Primary School, which partners with Carre's Grammar School using its Outreach programme. The playing fields include a bowls club and cricket pitch.

== Amenities ==
Amenities include the Duke of Wellington public house, Busy Bees Preschool, a post office shop, corner shop, farm shop, and two hairdressers.

A local bus service runs every hour to Sleaford, with links to Lincoln, Grantham, Nottingham and Skegness.

== Scout Group ==
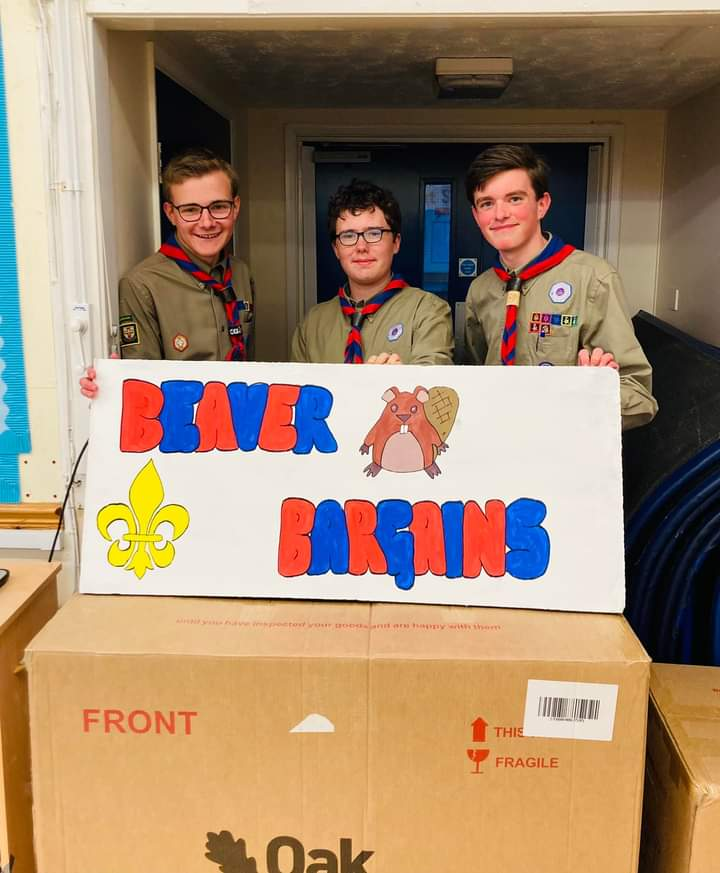
3 young leaders holding a sign for 1st Leasingham Beaver Scouts. (2022)

The local scout group is 1st Leasingham Scouts and is held in St Andrew's Primary School's main hall. The group is run by a selection of leaders and young leaders, split into beavers, cubs and scouts. The necker colours are red and blue.

The group takes part in remembrance service in Leasingham and St George's Day parades in Sleaford. The beavers on 17 April 2016 were invited round Sleaford Tesco Superstore to learn how their food is prepared as part of their farm2fork programme. And as part of Poacher 2022, both the beavers and cubs were invited to take part in Junior Poacher 2022 which involved a more limited version of the main event but still including activities like water zorbs and climbing walls. Whereas the scouts section took part in the whole event.
