= Scremby =

Village in Lincolnshire, England

Coordinates: 53.190300°N 0.157842°E

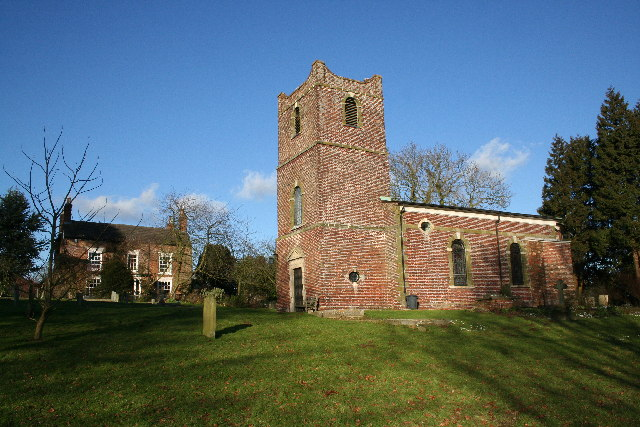
- Church of St Peter and St Paul, Scremby

- Location within Lincolnshire
- OS grid reference: TF442680
  - London: 120 mi (190 km) S
- Civil parish: Ashby with Scremby
- District: East Lindsey
- Shire county: Lincolnshire
- Region: East Midlands
- Country: England
- Sovereign state: United Kingdom
- Post town: Spilsby
- Postcode district: PE23
- Police: Lincolnshire
- Fire: Lincolnshire
- Ambulance: East Midlands
- UK Parliament: Louth and Horncastle

Scremby is a village in the civil parish of Ashby with Scremby, in the East Lindsey district of Lincolnshire, England. It is situated about 4 miles (6.4 km) north-east from Spilsby. In 1971 the parish had a population of 57. On 1 April 1987 the parish was abolished and merged with Ashby by Partney to form "Ashby with Scremby".

Scremby's red-brick church was built in 1733, and is dedicated to Saint Peter and Saint Paul. It is a Grade II* listed building.

Scremby Hall was home to the Brackenbury family, although the last resident family member left to live in Wimbledon, Surrey in 1937. It was demolished in the 1970s.

Scremby Manor was a 16th-century building with alterations in the 18th, 19th and 20th centuries. It is Grade II listed.

Scremby's C of E school – known as Scremby and Ashby C of E School from 1903 to 1935 – closed in 1960.

== Local archaeology ==
The deserted medieval village (DMV) of Laysingthorpe (or Laisintorp), was probably in or near Scremby.

Between 2017 and 2019, archaeological excavations near Scremby revealed a 5th-6th century AD high status Anglo-Saxon cemetery, with a range of grave goods that included jewellery, combs, shields and other weapons; in total 49 graves containing the remains of men and women were recovered. The site was initially discovered by a local metal detectorist; subsequent excavations were carried out by Dr Hugh Willmott from the University of Sheffield Archaeology Department, together with members of the Royal Air Force, and regional and international volunteers.
