= Irby in the Marsh =

Village and civil parish in Lincolnshire, England

Coordinates: 53.150365°N 0.194635°E

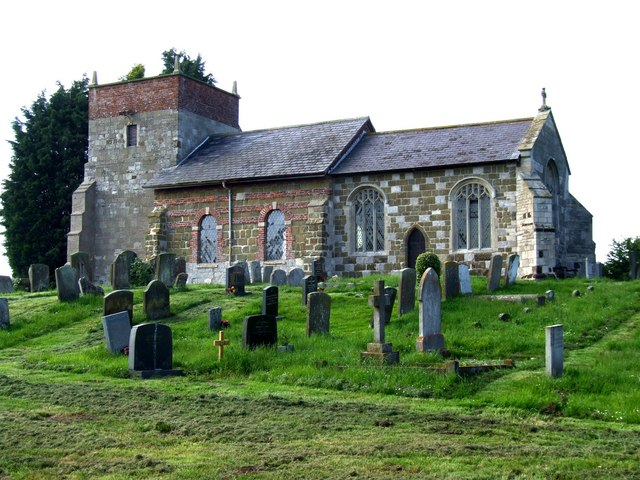
- All Saints Church, Irby in the Marsh

- Location within Lincolnshire
- Population: 187 (2011)
- OS grid reference: TF468637
  - London: 120 mi (190 km) S
- District: East Lindsey
- Shire county: Lincolnshire
- Region: East Midlands
- Country: England
- Sovereign state: United Kingdom
- Post town: SKEGNESS
- Postcode district: PE24
- Police: Lincolnshire
- Fire: Lincolnshire
- Ambulance: East Midlands
- UK Parliament: Louth and Horncastle

Irby in the Marsh is a village and civil parish in the East Lindsey district of Lincolnshire, England. It is situated on the B1195 road, geographically 4.5 miles (7 km) east from Spilsby and 6 miles (10 km) west from Skegness.

== Community ==
Irby has a population of 150 inhabitants in 72 households. Village houses are situated on the B1195 Spilsby Road, Pinfold Lane, and along local lanes and bridleways. Most residential properties are detached and date from late 18th-century farms and cottages to late 20th-century bungalows and individual houses. There has been barn conversions, and early 21st-century new-build properties on Pinfold Lane. At the southern edge of the village is the previous Prince Albert public house, now a private house.

Local recreation includes fishing, golf and cycling. The nearest local shops and public houses are at Burgh le Marsh, 4.5 miles (7 km) away by road. The small market towns of Spilsby, and Wainfleet All Saints lie in either direction along the B1195.

Irby's small Grade II* listed Anglican parish church is dedicated to All Saints, and seats approximately 95 people. Medieval in origin, it is constructed in greenstone and brick, and was re-detailed in 1770, with a new chancel added in 1886.

The Irby and Bratoft Village Hall is off Brambleberry Lane, close to the village boundary with Bratoft. The village hall is a community centre for social and group activities, and was refurbished in 2010. Planning permission was granted for the addition of a village shop and library at the hall in early 2012, with completion expected in 2013.
