= New Leake =

Village and civil parish in the East Lindsey district of Lincolnshire, England

Coordinates: 53.091512°N 0.078396°E

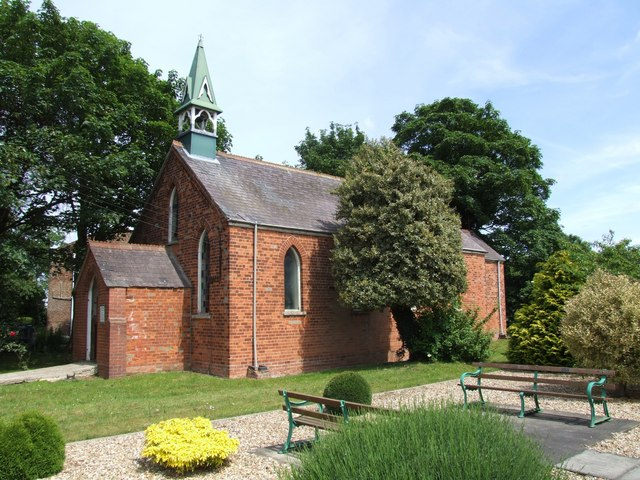
- St Jude's Mission Church, New Leake

- Location within Lincolnshire
- Population: 323 (2011 Census)
- OS grid reference: TF392569
  - London: 110 mi (180 km) S
- Civil parish: New Leake
- District: East Lindsey
- Shire county: Lincolnshire
- Region: East Midlands
- Country: England
- Sovereign state: United Kingdom
- Post town: Boston
- Postcode district: PE22
- Dialling code: 01205
- Police: Lincolnshire
- Fire: Lincolnshire
- Ambulance: East Midlands
- UK Parliament: Boston and Skegness

New Leake is a village and civil parish in the East Lindsey district of Lincolnshire, England. The population of the civil parish at the 2011 census was 323. It is situated 9 miles (14 km) north from Boston, and 10 miles (16 km) east from Coningsby.

St Judes Mission church lies within the village of New Leake. It appears to have been built and opened around 1896. It is part of the Stickney Group of churches

East Fen Chapel was a Primitive Methodist chapel originally built in 1831, but was replaced by a new building in 1855. It closed in 1969.

New Leake primary school was built in 1890, originally as the New Leake Board School, by the United School Board of the parishes of Old and New Leake (1881–1903).
