= West Fen =

Civil parish in Lincolnshire, England

Coordinates: 53.09°N 0.017°W

- Civil parish
- Ostler's Farm

- Location within Lincolnshire
- Interactive map of West Fen
- Area: 3.19 sq mi (8.3 km^{2})
- Population: 103 (2021)
  - Density: 32/sq mi (12/km^{2})
- OS grid reference: TF328569
- District: East Lindsey
- Shire county: Lincolnshire
- Region: East Midlands
- Country: England
- Sovereign state: United Kingdom
- Settlements: Revesby Bridge; Stickney
- Post town: BOSTON
- Postcode district: PE22
- Dialling code: 01205
- Police: Lincolnshire
- Fire: Lincolnshire
- Ambulance: East Midlands
- UK Parliament: Boston and Skegness

West Fen is a civil parish in the East Lindsey district of Lincolnshire, England. It is a sparsely populated Fenland parish located approximately 9 miles (14 km) north of Boston and east of Coningsby, lying between the villages of Carrington, Medlam, New Bolingbroke, Revesby and Stickney. At the 2021 census, the parish had a population of 103.

== Geography ==
West Fen occupies low-lying, flat agricultural land typical of the Lincolnshire Fens, with elevations generally around 1 to 3 metres (3.3 to 9.8 ft) above sea level. The landscape is dominated by arable farmland, drainage channels and dykes resulting from historic fen drainage schemes. The West Fen Catchwater Drain and the Medlam Drain form the principal eastern and western boundaries of the parish.

It forms part of the broader East and West Fens area, drained in the early 19th century under schemes involving engineer John Rennie. There is no nucleated village bearing the parish name, but there is a linear settlement extension of Stickney along the West Fen road which runs between it and the B1183. Revesby Bridge, an outlying village of Revesby, is partially enveloped by the far left corner of the parish.

== History ==
Archaeological remains in and around the parish include Mesolithic and later prehistoric flint scatters adjacent to Stickney Island, a possible prehistoric cursus on the edge of Wildmore Fen overlooking West Fen, and (in the wider West Fen area) Roman-British settlement and saltmaking sites.

West Fen was a township from 1812 to 1880. The civil parish was created in 1880 and consisted of detached fen allotments previously belonging to then parishes of Mavis Enderby, Hareby, Hundleby, West Keal, Raithby, Freiston and Leverton. It lay within the ancient Bolingbroke Soke in the Parts of Lindsey.

It is not an ancient parish of Lincolnshire and has never possessed its own Anglican parish church; residents historically attended churches in Carrington, New Bolingbroke or Stickney.

Two Wesleyan Methodist chapels formerly existed in the parish (near Hagnaby Lock and at West Houses).

The area historically had two brickyards. One of these, known as Stickney Brick Pit, was hand-dug for clay in the 19th century and later flooded to become a private carp fishing lake that retains over 150 years of industrial and angling history. Evidence of further post-medieval brick-making activity has also been recorded close to Hagnaby Park.

== Governance ==
West Fen is a civil parish within the East Lindsey district of Lincolnshire. Residents have elected not to have a formal parish council, instead holding periodic parish meetings to discuss local issues. It forms part of the Sibsey & Stickney electoral ward and the Boston and Skegness parliamentary constituency.

== Demographics ==
At the 2021 census the parish had 103 residents. The population is predominantly White British, with a high proportion of older residents.

Historical population figures show a gradual decline:

Historical population
Year	1881	1891	1901	1911	1921	1971	2001	2011	2021
Population	322	261	245	255	229	145	105	102	103

== Economy ==
The economy is almost entirely agricultural, focused on arable farming typical of the drained fenland. Limited local enterprises include holiday accommodation and camping at New Farm Holidays, farm-based leisure activities (including fishing) associated with Dyson Farming, hypnotherapy and holistic therapies, metal fabrication, and local fisheries/fishing lakes. Residents rely on nearby villages such as Stickney, Sibsey and Carrington, or the town of Boston, for most shops, services and wider employment.

== Transport ==
West Fen is a rural parish with limited public transport. The principal road access is via the B1183 route, which runs north from Boston through the area between Frithville and Carrington. Local minor roads and droves serve individual farms and scattered dwellings.

There is no railway station within the parish. The nearest stations are at Boston or further afield. Bus services, where available, connect to surrounding villages and Boston.

== Landmarks ==
The parish contains one listed building: Musgrave's Bridge (Grade II), a single-span red-brick accommodation bridge of c.1805 designed by John Rennie the Elder as part of the West Fen drainage scheme. It carries West Fen Lane over the West Fen Catchwater Drain near Musgrave's Farm.

There are no Grade I or II* listed buildings or major scheduled monuments specifically recorded within the modern parish boundaries. The landscape is characterised by the extensive network of 19th-century drainage channels associated with the East and West Fens drainage scheme. Isolated 19th-century farmsteads, such as West Fen Farm near Stickney, are typical of the area.

== Community ==
As a small, dispersed rural parish, West Fen has minimal community facilities. Residents use amenities in neighbouring settlements for education, worship, shopping and recreation.
