= Ulceby with Fordington =

Civil parish in Lincolnshire, England

Coordinates: 53.233°N 0.129°E

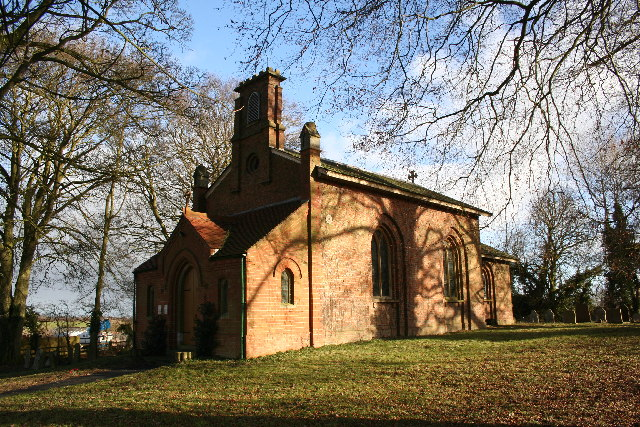
- All Saints Church, Ulceby

- Location within Lincolnshire
- Population: 147 (2011)
- OS grid reference: TF4272
  - London: 120 mi (190 km) S
- Unitary authority: East Lindsey
- Shire county: Lincolnshire
- Region: East Midlands
- Country: England
- Sovereign state: United Kingdom
- Post town: Alford
- Postcode district: LN13
- Dialling code: 01507
- Police: Lincolnshire
- Fire: Lincolnshire
- Ambulance: East Midlands

Ulceby with Fordington is a civil parish in the East Lindsey district of Lincolnshire, England. The parish is situated 27 miles (43 km) east from the city and county town of Lincoln and 3 miles (5 km) south-west from Alford. The A1028 road runs through the parish.

Also known as Ulceby by Alford and Ulceby cum Fordington, the principal settlements are Ulceby, a village, and Fordington, a small hamlet, which was once a Roman Camp.

== History ==
In the early 1870s John Marius Wilson described the parish as:

Ulceby, a parish in Spilsby district, Lincoln; 2½ miles SW of Alford r. station. Post town, Alford. Acres, 2,220. Real property, £1,622. Pop., 212. Houses, 38. The manor belongs to Capt. Mansell. The living is a rectory in the diocese of Lincoln. Value, £650.* Patron, the Rev. W. A. Peacock. The church is good.

From 1894 to 1974 Ulceby with Fordington parish was part of Spilsby Rural District.

Within the All Saints Church in Ulceby, there are various memorials dedicated to soldiers from the First and Second World Wars. The First World War memorial is a plaque bearing seven names, which was unveiled in May 1920. The Second World War memorial holds two names and is a similar but smaller plaque located in the All Saints Church. There is also an individual memorial plaque to the memory of Captain George Mansel, who died in September 1884. There is also an RAF war memorial made of granite at the junction of the A16 road. It was placed there on the 50th anniversary of the Lancaster PB 476 (PHY) aircraft which crashed near the placement of the memorial due to a Luftwaffe intruder. Before 1921 the children of Ulceby with Fordington attended a school in Well, a parish situated 1.5 miles (2.4 km) south-west from Alford. In 1912 the parish built a County Council School which most children from the parish now attend. There was once an Anglican church in the hamlet of Fordington, however no trace of it remains.

== Parish ==
Population Graph of Ulceby with Fordington

The main place of worship in Ulceby with Fordington is named All Saints Church, of which registers have been recorded since 1749 and a chapel was built here by Wesleyan Methodists in 1863. All Saints Church is an Anglican parish church located in Ulceby village. Seating approximately 120, the church was rebuilt in 1826 and restored in 1885. Ulceby with Fordington is one of 189 parishes within the district of East Lindsey. A hill named "The Bull's Head" is a noted landmark in the parish.

== Demographics and housing ==
Industry of Ulceby with Fordington in 1881 and 2011

Between 1801 and 1911, the population has varied only by 58 people, having a minimum of 160 residents in 1891 and maximum of 218 in 1831. Census data of March 2011 highlights that the population was at 147 with 61 dwellings, noting that this parish is not very populated. Census data further states that 102 of these inhabitants class themselves as Christian and 2 are another religion. The other 13 did not state their religion and 30 of these people are not religious. Of 147 inhabitants in 2011, 144 lived in a whole house or a bungalow, with the other 3 inhabitants living in caravans or other temporary housing. The majority of houses in the Parish have three to four bedrooms. Approximately 90 were listed as detached, 44 were semi-detached and 10 were terraced. None of these dwellings were shared, possibly highlighting that the population of Ulceby with Fordington is a more affluent area due to this housing trend.

== Industry and economy ==
In the 1801 census, the industry in the parish was divided into four sectors; agriculture, trade, manufacturing or handicraft. From 1841 onwards, the detail of occupations was more intricate and specifically recorded, listing over 3,000 job titles. As the pie charts show, in 1881, the most popular trades were agriculture, domestic services and working with animals. In 2001, 61 inhabitants were employed but the most common occupation was in manufacturing In the 2011 census data, it shows that out of 117 residents of working age or over, 77 were employed. The data shows that 15 worked part-time, 46 worked full-time, 13 were self-employed, 3 were unemployed and 21 were retired.
