= Addlethorpe =

Village in Lincolnshire, England

Coordinates: 53.195°N 0.317°E

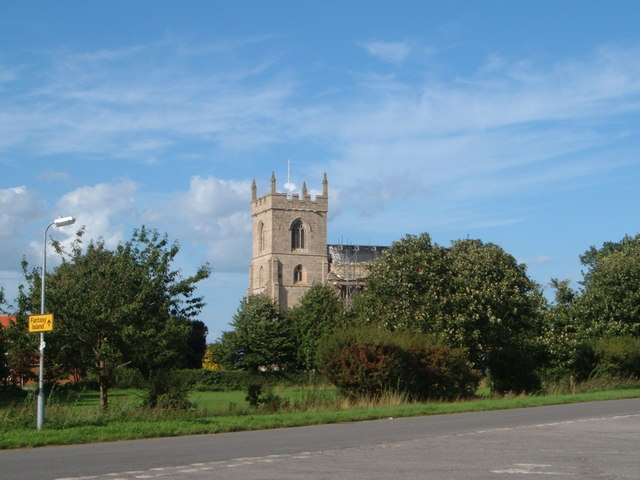
- St Nicholas Church, Addlethorpe

- Location within Lincolnshire
- Population: 333 (2011)
- OS grid reference: TF549689
  - London: 143 mi (230 km) SSW
- Civil parish: Addlethorpe
- District: East Lindsey
- Shire county: Lincolnshire
- Ceremonial county: Lincolnshire
- Region: East Midlands
- Country: England
- Sovereign state: United Kingdom
- Post town: Skegness
- Postcode district: PE24
- Dialling code: 01754
- Police: Lincolnshire
- Fire: Lincolnshire
- Ambulance: East Midlands
- UK Parliament: Boston and Skegness

Addlethorpe is a small village situated just off the A52 west of Ingoldmells in the East Lindsey district of Lincolnshire, England.

Addlethorpe is recorded in the 1086 Domesday Book with 102 households and two churches.

The parish church is dedicated to Saint Nicholas and is a Grade I listed building dating from the 15th century, being restored in 1875. Both the tower and the font are 15th-century, and the pulpit is early 18th-century. It lost its chancel in 1706. In the churchyard is the lower half of a 14th-century churchyard cross, which is both Grade II listed, and a scheduled monument.

The Wesleyan Methodists built a chapel here in 1837, which was rebuilt in 1968. It is now part of the Skegness Coast Methodist Churches group, with services every Sunday.

Addlethorpe Windmill was built about 1830 to replace an earlier post mill, and was constructed of tarred red brick. It ceased working in 1944, and today is missing its cap. It is a Grade II listed building.

The golf course is 6,400 yards (5,900 m) from the white competition tees, and has an unusually-high par of 74 across two laps of its 9-hole layout. Village includes two caravan sites.

Year	1801	1811	1821	1831	1841	1851	1881	1891	1901	1911	1921	1931	1941	1951	1961	2001	2011
Population	190	192	176	175	238	288	243	224	211	213	201	285	n/a	300	282	377	333

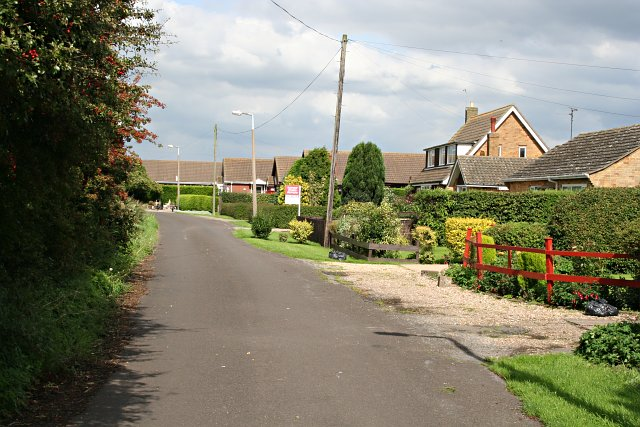
Addlethorpe Village

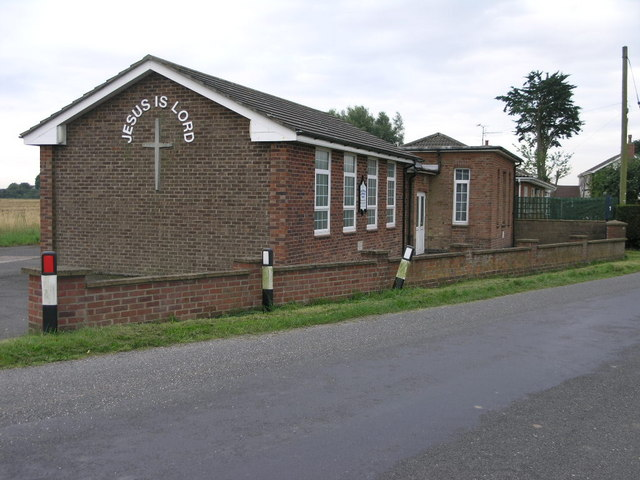
Addlethorpe Methodist Church

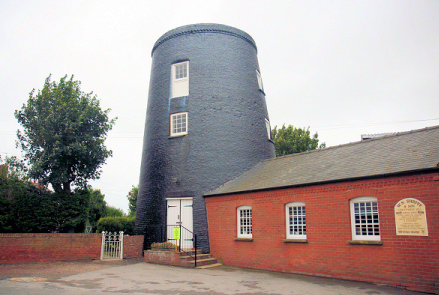
Addlethorpe Mill
