= Ulceby, East Lindsey =

Village in Lincolnshire, England

Coordinates: 53.232674°N 0.12923°E

Ulceby
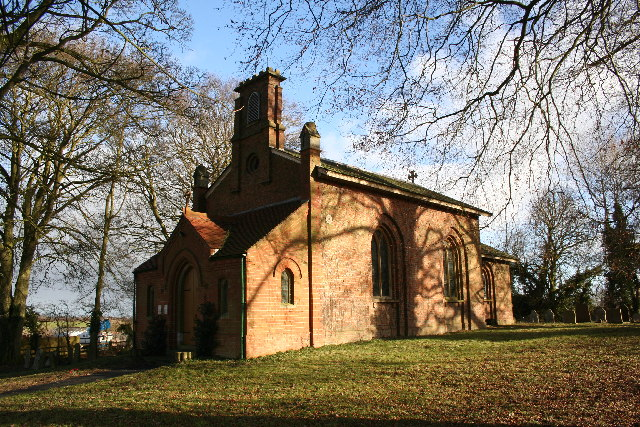
- Church of All Saints, Ulceby

- Location within Lincolnshire
- OS grid reference: TF422727
  - London: 120 mi (190 km) S
- Civil parish: Ulceby with Fordington
- District: East Lindsey
- Shire county: Lincolnshire
- Region: East Midlands
- Country: England
- Sovereign state: United Kingdom
- Post town: ALFORD
- Postcode district: LN13
- Police: Lincolnshire
- Fire: Lincolnshire
- Ambulance: East Midlands
- UK Parliament: Boston and Skegness

Ulceby is a village in the East Lindsey district of Lincolnshire in England. It is situated next to the A1028 road, it is located 11 miles (18 km) east from Horncastle and 3 miles (4.8 km) south-west from Alford, and forms part of Ulceby with Fordington civil parish (where the population is listed).

The hamlet of Ulceby Cross lies at the intersection of the A16, A1028 and A1104 roads about 1 mile (1.6 km) north-west of the village at grid reference TF412736.
