= Markby =

Village and civil parish in the East Lindsey district of Lincolnshire, England

Coordinates: 53.285655°N 0.228115°E

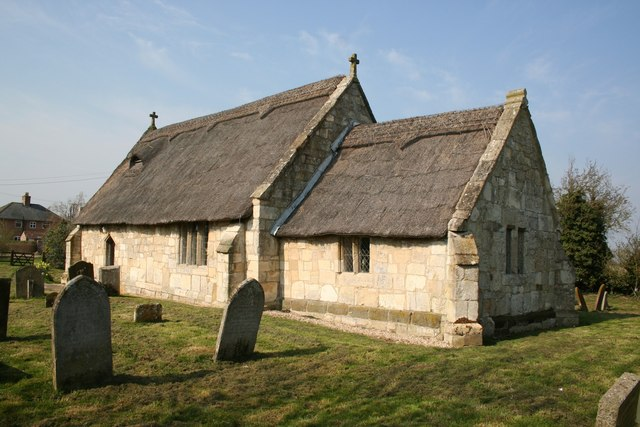
- The thatched Church of St Peter, Markby

- Location within Lincolnshire
- OS grid reference: TF486788
  - London: 120 mi (190 km) S
- District: East Lindsey
- Shire county: Lincolnshire
- Region: East Midlands
- Country: England
- Sovereign state: United Kingdom
- Post town: Alford
- Postcode district: LN13
- Police: Lincolnshire
- Fire: Lincolnshire
- Ambulance: East Midlands
- UK Parliament: Louth and Horncastle

Markby is a village and civil parish in the East Lindsey district of Lincolnshire, England. It is situated approximately 4 miles (6 km) north-east from Alford.

== Church ==
The Anglican church of St Peter is one of England's few thatched churches, and the only one in Lincolnshire. Its interior fittings and structural beams were perhaps made locally. The font is from an older church on the same site, with box pews and pulpit from the 19th century. The church bell might be the earlier Priory refectory bell. Within the church is Norman decoration. Before the 16th-century dissolution of the monasteries local worshippers used the priory church, and after the Dissolution, other parts of the priory by permission. A further corrugated iron church was built in the late 19th century, to take the place of the stone and thatch church which was in poor repair. As of 1916, the church was used only for burials. This later iron church became unusable in the 1960s, so consequently the earlier church was renovated.
