= Westville, Lincolnshire =

Hamlet in the East Lindsey district of Lincolnshire, England

Coordinates: 53.0760°N 0.0940°W

Westville
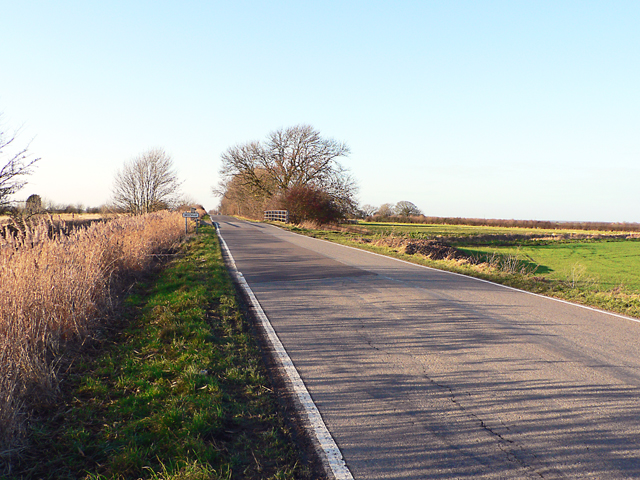
- Westville Road

- Location within Lincolnshire
- OS grid reference: TF277548
  - London: 110 mi (180 km) S
- Civil parish: Frithville and Westville
- District: East Lindsey
- Shire county: Lincolnshire
- Region: East Midlands
- Country: England
- Sovereign state: United Kingdom
- Post town: LINCOLN
- Postcode district: PE22
- Police: Lincolnshire
- Fire: Lincolnshire
- Ambulance: East Midlands
- UK Parliament: Boston and Skegness (UK Parliament constituency)

Westville is a hamlet in the civil parish of Frithville and Westville, in the East Lindsey district of Lincolnshire, England. It is situated 7 miles (11 km) north from Boston. Westville lies in the fen country close to the village of Frithville.

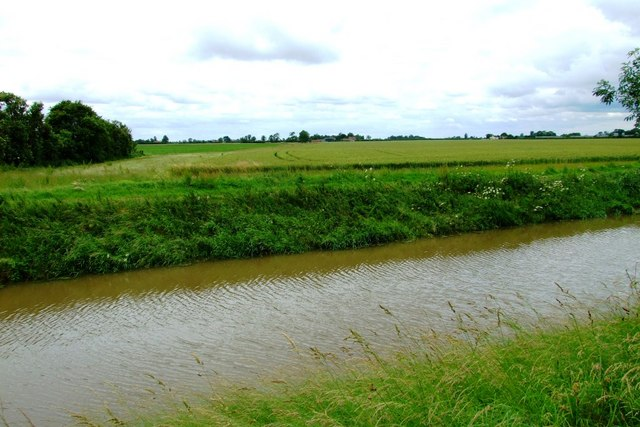
West Fen Drain at Westville

Westville consists of Westville Farm and a couple of houses including the original Farmhouse, (Home Farm). Home Farm's barn was sold off and has now been converted into a barn conversion.

Westville was created a township after the draining of the West Fen in 1812, in 1866 Westville became a separate civil parish, on 1 April 2005 the parish was abolished and merged with Frithville to form "Frithville and Westville". In 1971 the parish had a population of 55.

John Rennie directed the building of an early-19th-century bridge over the Twenty Foot Drain at Westville; it is Grade II listed.
