= Orby =

Village and civil parish in the East Lindsey district of Lincolnshire, England

Coordinates: 53.182217°N 0.231062°E

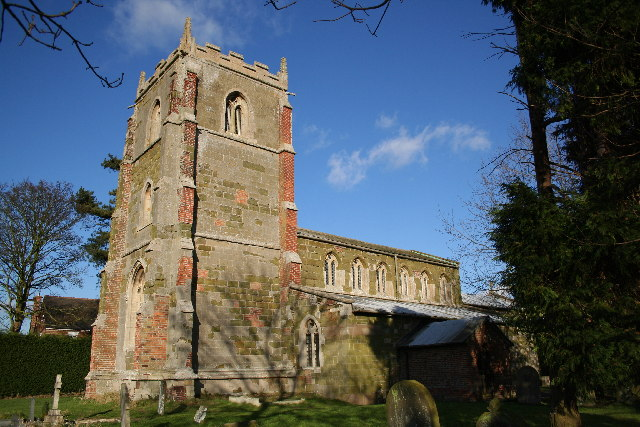
- All Saints' Church, Orby

- Location within Lincolnshire
- Population: 353 (2011)
- OS grid reference: TF491673
  - London: 115 mi (185 km) S
- District: East Lindsey
- Shire county: Lincolnshire
- Region: East Midlands
- Country: England
- Sovereign state: United Kingdom
- Post town: SKEGNESS
- Postcode district: PE24
- Police: Lincolnshire
- Fire: Lincolnshire
- Ambulance: East Midlands
- UK Parliament: Louth and Horncastle

Orby is a village and civil parish in the East Lindsey district of Lincolnshire, England. It is situated approximately 9 miles (14 km) east from the town of Spilsby, and 5 miles (8 km) west from the seaside resort of Skegness. The civil parish includes the hamlet of Habertoft, 1.5 miles (2.4 km) to the north-west. Orby lies within the Lincolnshire coast marshes.

== History ==
Orby is listed in the 1086 Domesday Book as "Heresbi", and in 1115 it was recorded as "Orreby". However, this unusual citation does not relate to any described settlement within the parish itself, but is used instead, as a reference point to help locate lands held by the Bishop of Durham in neighbouring Addlethorpe.

The church, which is dedicated to All Saints, is a Grade II* listed building dating from the 13th century with later alterations and additions. The chancel was rebuilt in 1888.

Manor House Farm is a Grade II listed farmhouse dating from 1660, of red brick, which replaced an earlier medieval moated manor, the site of which is an ancient scheduled monument.

Orby County Primary School was originally built in 1837 as a National School. It was rebuilt in 1874 but closed only three years later. In 1878 it was reopened as the Orby Board School, after the formation of the Orby School Board that year. The School Boards were abolished in 1903, and the school underwent name changes before becoming Orby County Primary School in 1963. It closed on 22 July 1981.
