= Cumberworth =

Village in Lincolnshire, England

Coordinates: 53.238332°N 0.255788°E

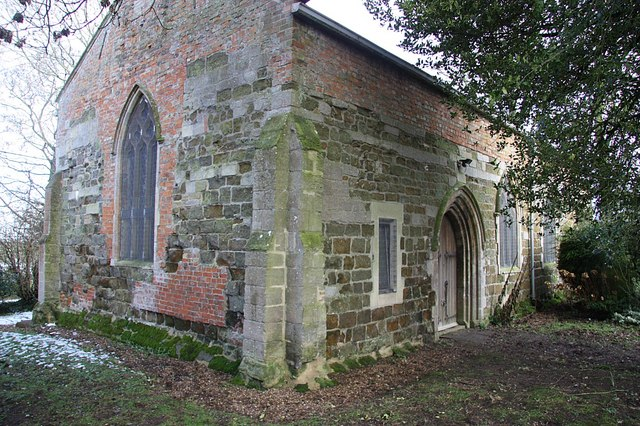
- Church of St Helen, Cumberworth

- Location within Lincolnshire
- Population: 128 (2011)
- OS grid reference: TF506736
  - London: 120 mi (190 km) S
- Civil parish: Cumberworth
- District: East Lindsey
- Shire county: Lincolnshire
- Region: East Midlands
- Country: England
- Sovereign state: United Kingdom
- Post town: Alford
- Postcode district: LN13
- Police: Lincolnshire
- Fire: Lincolnshire
- Ambulance: East Midlands
- UK Parliament: Boston and Skegness

Cumberworth is a small village and civil parish in the East Lindsey district of Lincolnshire, England. It is situated approximately 3.5 miles (6 km) south-east from the town of Alford.

The village is listed in the 1086 Domesday Book with 9 households and 20 acres (8.1 ha) of meadow. After the Domesday survey Rainer of Brimeaux became Lord of the manor.

Cumberworth church was dedicated to St Helen and is a Grade II Listed Building. Parts of the church date from the 13th century, but it was largely rebuilt in 1838. It was declared redundant in 1987 and sold in 1989.
