= Frithville =

Village and civil parish in the East Lindsey district of Lincolnshire, England

Coordinates: 53.033368°N 0.028576°W

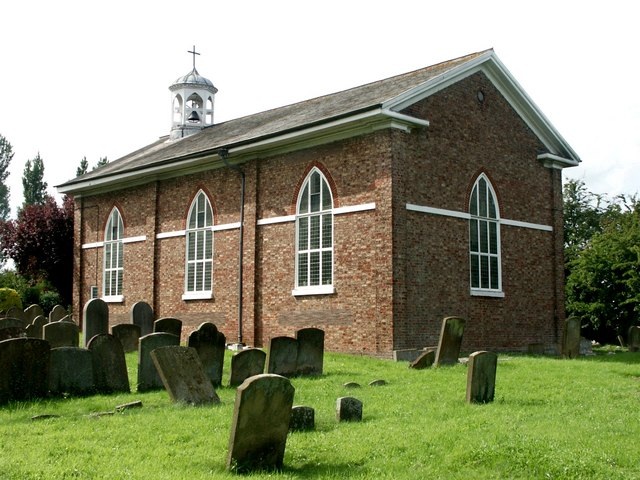
- St Peter's Church, Frithville

- Location within Lincolnshire
- Population: 568 (2011)
- OS grid reference: TF322502
  - London: 100 mi (160 km) S
- Civil parish: Frithville and Westville
- District: East Lindsey
- Shire county: Lincolnshire
- Region: East Midlands
- Country: England
- Sovereign state: United Kingdom
- Post town: Boston
- Postcode district: PE22
- Police: Lincolnshire
- Fire: Lincolnshire
- Ambulance: East Midlands
- UK Parliament: Boston and Skegness

Frithville is a village and former civil parish, now in the parish of Frithville and Westville in the East Lindsey district of Lincolnshire, England. The population of Frithville and Westville was 549 in 2001, increasing at the 2011 census to 568. It is served by the B1183 road, and is approximately 4 miles (6 km) north of Boston, in the West Fen fenland area.

== History ==
The name Frith comes from the Old English fyrhoe, meaning wood or woody pasture. The first mention of Frith in historical records is in 1323 when it was called Le Frith; in 1512 it was referred to as "The Kings Frith beside Boston". Formerly extra-parochial land, Frithville was enclosed in 1802. This was one of seven new townships north of Boston that were organized in 1812.

The civil townships were organized at the same time as this remote area had major projects in the three fens for installing drains to claim the land for agricultural development. This continues to be a rural area with an economy based on agriculture. Chief crops in the late 19th century were wheat and beans.

The Anglican church of Saint Peter was built in 1821, much later than many churches in Lincolnshire. It is among those built after 1810, known as Fens chapels or the Georgian group, for their style of architecture. Numerous churches in the shire predate the Protestant Reformation. St. Peter's is a Grade II listed building. It is in the hamlet of Mount Pleasant, which was included in the township of Frithville when the latter was organized. It is one of several churches built in the area under the Fen Churches Act 1816. In 1885 Kelly's Directory reported that the brick-built church and the vicarage were erected simultaneously. The parish also had a Wesleyan chapel.

Frithville has a primary school and an agricultural shop.

Because of repeated flooding in the Fens, several drains were constructed through this area in the 19th century to reduce water damage to agriculture and settlements. Before the drains, the land was used largely for seasonal pasture. Those projects crossing Frithville include the West Fen Drain, the Twenty Foot Drain, and the Medlam Drain. In the 21st century, summer boaters travel the waterways for recreation.

== Governance ==
There is a Frithville electoral ward. The population of this ward at the 2011 census was 1,920.

In 1961 the parish of Frithville had a population of 627. On 1 April 2005 the parish was abolished and merged with Westville to form "Frithville and Westville".
