= Bratoft =

Small hamlet in the East Lindsey district of Lincolnshire, England

Coordinates: 53.161747°N 0.203146°E

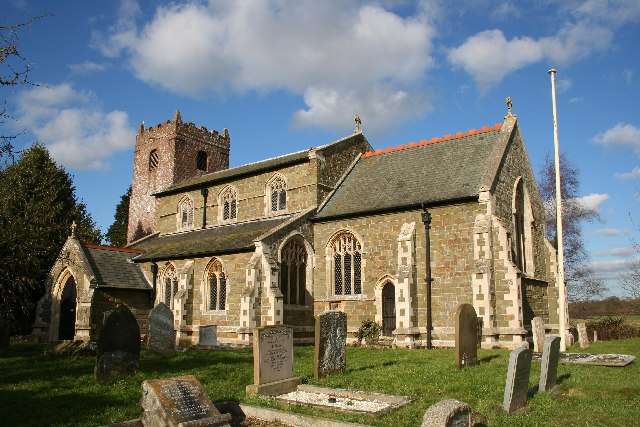
- St Peter and St Paul's church, Bratoft

- Location within Lincolnshire
- Population: 143 (2011)
- OS grid reference: TF473650
  - London: 115 mi (185 km) S
- District: East Lindsey
- Shire county: Lincolnshire
- Region: East Midlands
- Country: England
- Sovereign state: United Kingdom
- Post town: Skegness
- Postcode district: PE24
- Police: Lincolnshire
- Fire: Lincolnshire
- Ambulance: East Midlands
- UK Parliament: Boston and Skegness

Bratoft is a small hamlet in the East Lindsey district of Lincolnshire, England. It is situated approximately 5 miles (8 km) east from Spilsby, 2 miles (3 km) west from Burgh Le Marsh, and south from the A158 road.

Bratoft Grade II listed Anglican church is dedicated to St Peter and St Paul. The church was completely restored in 1890. The octagonal font dates from the early 15th century, and the chancel screen and parclose screens date from about 1460. On the north wall of the tower interior hangs a picture of the Armada, signed "Robert Stephenson". Between pictorial elements for England, Scotland, Ireland and France is depicted the Armada as a red dragon. The text beneath states:

Spaine's proud Armado with great strength and power
Great Britain's state came gapeing to devour,
This Dragon's guts, like Pharaos scattered hoast,
Lay splitt and drowned upon the Irish coast.
For of eight score save two ships sent from Spaine
But twenty-five scarce sound return'd again.
Non nobis Domine

In 1747 the preacher and biblical commentator Thomas Scott was born in Bratoft.

Near Bratoft is Gunby Hall, a National Trust property open to the public, a red-brick house, dating from 1700, with Victorian walled gardens, which Tennyson described as a "haunt of ancient peace", It is alleged that Sir William Massingberd's daughter tried to elope with one of his postilion riders but her father shot the man dead. Sir William was sentenced to appear in London annually at which time the family coat of arms was smeared with blood. It proved too much so Sir William demolished the family seat at Bratoft Castle and built Gunby Hall in 1700. It is said the ghosts of his daughter and the man walk on the path near the hall. Also within the village is Whitegates Cottage, a small thatched cottage dating from c.1770.

Bratoft Meadow is an area of semi-natural species rich grassland. In 1970 a fertilizer experiment was set up to examine the effect of different forms and rates of fertilizer application on the conservation value of this type of old meadow. The particular species of interest in this study was the Green-winged Orchid Orchis morio.
