= Toynton All Saints =

Village and civil parish in the East Lindsey district of Lincolnshire, England

Coordinates: 53.156561°N 0.080865°E

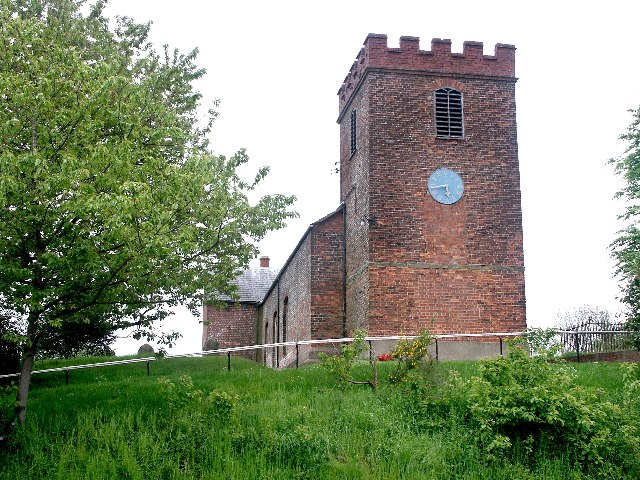
- Church of All Saints, Toynton All Saints

- Location within Lincolnshire
- Population: 452 (2021)
- OS grid reference: TF392641
  - London: 120 mi (190 km) S
- District: East Lindsey
- Shire county: Lincolnshire
- Region: East Midlands
- Country: England
- Sovereign state: United Kingdom
- Post town: Spilsby
- Postcode district: PE23
- Police: Lincolnshire
- Fire: Lincolnshire
- Ambulance: East Midlands
- UK Parliament: Louth and Horncastle

Toynton All Saints is a village and civil parish in the East Lindsey district of Lincolnshire, England, about 1.5 miles (2.4 km) south of the town of Spilsby.

== Geography ==
Toynton All Saints, and its neighbours, the village of Toynton St Peter and the hamlet of Toynton Fen Side, which lies directly south of Toynton All Saints, are listed three times in the Domesday Book of 1086, jointly as "Toantun" so it is not possible to distinguish which entry referred to which place. As a whole, "Toantun" consisted of 78 households and had a church.

Toynton All Saints has a primary school.

== History ==
A medieval pottery kiln and clay pits were recorded during excavations at The Roses, a field in Toynton All Saints, during the 1950s. The kiln was archaeomagnetically dated from 1275 to 1300. Jugs, tiles, water pipes and varieties of domestic pots were found.

The parish church is Grade II listed and dedicated to All Saints. It dates from the 18th century and built of red brick, with late 19th-century alterations. The octagonal font is 14th-century with a 19th-century restored base.

A Wesleyan Methodist chapel was built in 1860, extended in 1939 and again in 2001.

A tower windmill was built in the early 19th century, and is Grade II listed. It was converted to a house and extended in the 20th century.

A rectory, built in 1872, was owned by The Bishop of Lincoln.

Two parachute mines were dropped in early May 1941, near Chapel Lane.

The village was the home of folklorist, Ethel Rudkin, in the latter part of her life. Rudkin was a collector, as well as an archaeologist and writer, her most notable work is the book Lincolnshire Folklore.
