= Toynton St Peter =

Village and civil parish in the East Lindsey district of Lincolnshire, England

Coordinates: 53.147986°N 0.099301°E

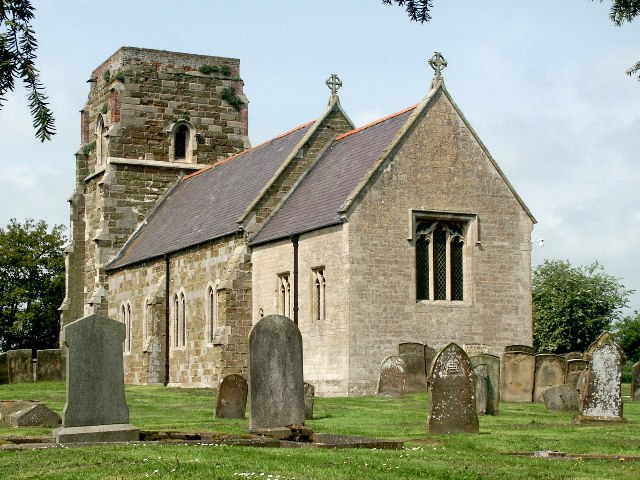
- St Peter's Church, Toynton St Peter

- Location within Lincolnshire
- Population: 256 (2011)
- OS grid reference: TF404632
  - London: 115 mi (185 km) S
- District: East Lindsey
- Shire county: Lincolnshire
- Region: East Midlands
- Country: England
- Sovereign state: United Kingdom
- Post town: SPILSBY
- Postcode district: PE23
- Police: Lincolnshire
- Fire: Lincolnshire
- Ambulance: East Midlands
- UK Parliament: Louth and Horncastle

Toynton St Peter is a village and civil parish in the East Lindsey district of Lincolnshire, England, approximately 2 miles (3 km) south from the town of Spilsby.

Toynton St Peter, and its neighbours Toynton All Saints, and Toynton Fenside are listed three times in the Domesday Book of 1086, jointly as "Toantun" so it is not possible to distinguish which entry referred to which place. As a whole, "Toantun" consisted of 78 households and had a church.

The parish church is a Grade II listed building dedicated to Saint Peter and dating from the 14th century, although it was rebuilt in 1876 by James Fowler of Louth. It was built of greenstone and limestone with some brick patching. It has a 15th-century tower and a 14th-century font.

In the churchyard is the base of a 14th-century churchyard cross which is both Grade II listed and a scheduled monument.

A Wesleyan Methodist chapel was built in 1811. The chapel is now closed and an application for planning permission to convert it into a dwelling was refused.

The parish has a village hall.
