= The Tofts =

Landform of the Lincolnshire coast, England

The Tofts is a 0.8–1 km-wide band of raised ground along part of the Lincolnshire coast, running between Wainfleet All Saints and Wrangle parallel to the Wash.

== Description ==
The Tofts rise to 8m above Ordnance Datum at Sailholme, 7m at Wainfleet All Saints and 5–6m along much of the rest of the feature's length. This is considerably higher than the Low Grounds to the north (often 2–3m above Ordnance Datum), and the Marsh which separates the Tofts from the seafront and sits at 3–4m above Ordnance Datum. While the name the Tofts refers to the structure as a whole, parts of it are known as Wainfleet Tofts, Friskney Tofts and Wrangle Tofts, after the main villages which occupy its length.

== History ==
=== Origin ===
The origin of the Tofts is unclear. It is probable that in the Roman period of occupation, the terrain between Sibsey and East and West Keal represented the edge of a basin which contained fenland, salt marshes and tidal flats. The British Geological Survey states that the sea-facing edge of the Tofts is made of storm beach deposits. Scholars working on the Fenland Project have suggested that the tidal system present in the Wash would not usually produce a barrier island and that the Tofts was therefore likely created through human processes. Regardless, by c. AD 500 a sand bar running the length of the Tofts was in place.

=== Human habitation ===
There is limited evidence for human settlement at the site before the 11th century. By the 11th century Friskney, Wolmersty and Wrangle were established on the raised ground, while Wainfleet had formed on a roddon by the north-eastern end. The Tofts acted as a sea defence; the former path running along the length of the Tofts (variously called High Street, Highgate and Saltersgate) is described as a sea-dyke by H. E. Hallam. Salt-making took place in the proximity during the Middle Ages; between Leake and Wainfleet, there were 56 salterns mentioned in the Domesday Book of 1086 and there are many subsequent documentary references to salt-production among the medieval inhabitants. The long strips of land occupied by salters (tofts) provide the name for the feature. The process of producing salt from salt marsh also gradually led to the accretion of wastes in the havens at Wrangle, Wainfleet and Friskney, as well as along the estuaries at the havens and along the Tofts's seaward side. The geographer Ian Simmons has argued that this process and the presence of salterns along much of the coast led to the "seawards movement" of a coastline composed of salterns. The top 2–3m of the Tofts, which are composed of silt and sands, are probably human deposits and the remnants waste from these salt-making activities.

Gradually, the mounds of salt waste atop The Tofts were turned into flat farming land, but the timing is not known. The salt-making industry suffered under storms in the late 16th century and stopped in the area in the early 17th century; the sea-facing Marsh was also gradually extended as reclamation took place from the 17th century. 19th-century maps show many long, thin field boundaries which likely reflect the location of former salterns; in some areas, the former medieval salt-cotes have been replaced with farms and houses.
