= A16 road (England) =

Road in Lincolnshire, England

A16

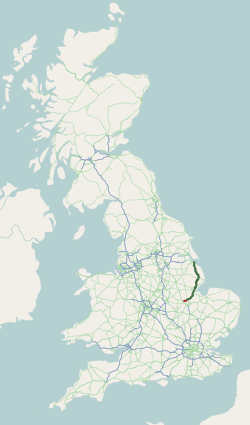

Route information
- Length: 78.3 mi (126.0 km)

Major junctions
- South end: A47 in Peterborough
- A151 near Spalding A17 in Sutterton; A52 in Boston A158 near Partney A18 near Ludborough

- North end: A180 in Grimsby

Location
- Country: United Kingdom
- Constituent country: England
- Primary destinations: Spalding; Boston

Road network
- Roads in the United Kingdom; Motorways; A and B road zones
| ← A15 | → A17 |

The A16 road is a principal road of Lincolnshire in the East Midlands region of England, connecting the port of Grimsby and Peterborough, where it meets the A1175, A47 & A1139 then on to the A1 and the A605; the latter, in turn, giving a through route to Northampton and the west, and south west of England. Its length is 78 miles (126 km). The road was "de-trunked", with responsibility largely returned to Lincolnshire County Council from the Highways Agency in 2002.

== Settlements on route ==
From north to south its route is:

- Grimsby
- Utterby
- Louth (now bypassed)
- Burwell
- Walmsgate
- Dalby
- Partney (now bypassed)
- Spilsby
- East Keal
- Keal Cotes
- Stickford (now bypassed)
- Stickney
- Sibsey
- Hilldyke
- Boston
- Wyberton (now bypassed)
- Kirton (now bypassed)
- Surfleet (now bypassed)
- Pinchbeck (now bypassed)
- Spalding (now bypassed)
- Crowland (bypassed)
- Peterborough

The road is a Primary Route for its entire length. Most of the A16 is single carriageway.

== History ==
=== Ludborough Bypass opening ===
The 1-mile (1.6 km) £1.2 million Ludborough Bypass opened on 25 October 1992.

=== Fotherby Bypass opening ===
The 1-mile (1.6 km) Fotherby Bypass opened in 2004.

=== Louth Bypass opening ===
3-mile (4.8 km) £6.6 million Louth Bypass opened in August 1991.

=== Partney Bypass opening ===
The 1-mile (1.6 km) Partney Bypass opened in August 2005.

=== Stickford Bypass opening ===
The 1-mile (1.6 km) £1 million Stickford Bypass opened in October 1992.

=== Boston Inner Relief Road opening ===
The £1.4 million Boston Inner Relief Road opened in early 1978.

=== Boston-Algarkirk Diversion opening ===
The 6-mile (9.7 km) £11.5 million Boston-Algarkirk Diversion opened in October 1991.

=== Spalding Bypass opening ===
The 11-mile (18 km) £23 million Spalding-Sutterton Improvement (the Spalding Bypass) opened in August 1995.

== Junction list ==
| County | Location | mi | km | Destinations | Notes |
|---|---|---|---|---|---|
| Cambridgeshire | Peterborough | 0.0 | 0.0 | A47 (Eye Road) / Welland Road to A1 / A15 / A605 – Wisbech, Peterborough, Leicester, Dogsthrope, The North, London, Sleaford, Northampton, Eye, Eye Green, Thorney | Southern terminus |
| Lincolnshire | Cowbit–Spalding boundary | 13.1 | 21.1 | A1175 south-west / B1173 (Barrier Bank) to A15 – Stamford, Spalding town centre, Bourne, Deeping St Nicholas, Market Deeping | North-eastern terminus of A1175 |
| Lincolnshire | Spalding | 16.2 | 26.1 | A151 (Holbeach Road) to A17 – Spalding, Holbeach, King's Lynn, Weston, Moulton | |
| Lincolnshire | Surfleet | 19.8 | 31.9 | A152 north-west – Surfleet, Gosberton, Donington | South-eastern terminus of A152 |
| Lincolnshire | Sutterton | 23.2 | 37.3 | A17 / Station Road to A52 – King's Lynn, Sleaford, Grantham, Sutterton, Fosdyke, Wigtoft | |
| Lincolnshire | Boston | 29.7 | 47.8 | A52 west (Liquorport Road) to A1121 – Grantham, Sleaford | Southern terminus of A52 concurrency |
| Lincolnshire | Boston | 29.9 | 48.1 | A1138 south (South End) – Fishtoft | Fishtoft signed northbound only; northern terminus of A1138 |
| Lincolnshire | Boston | 30.4 | 48.9 | Horncastle Road (A1137 west) / Wide Bargate / B1183 – Horncastle | Eastern terminus of A1137 |
| Lincolnshire | Boston | 31.2 | 50.2 | A52 east (Wainfleet Road) – Wainfleet, Fishtoft | Fishtoft signed southbound only; northern terminus of A52 concurrency |
| Lincolnshire | West Keal–East Keal boundary | 43.4 | 69.8 | A155 west (Main Road) to A153 – Sleaford, West Keal, East Kirkby | Eastern terminus of A155 |
| Lincolnshire | Partney | 47.5 | 76.4 | A158 – Skegness, Lincoln, Partney, Scremby, Burgh le Marsh, Sausthorpe, Horncastle | |
| Lincolnshire | Ulceby with Fordington | 51.4 | 82.7 | A1028 south-east (Main Road) / A1104 north-east to A158 – Skegness, Mablethorpe, Ulceby, Alford, Bilsby | Ulceby signed northbound only; north-western terminus of A1028; south-western terminus of A1104 |
| Lincolnshire | Raithby cum Maltby | 60.4 | 97.2 | A157 east (Station Road) / B1520 (London Road) – Mablethorpe, Louth, Manby, Saltfleetby | Southern terminus of A157 concurrency |
| Lincolnshire | Elkington | 62.6 | 100.7 | A157 west / B1200 to A631 – Lincoln, Louth, Gainsborough, Market Rasen, Wragby | Northern terminus of A157 concurrency |
| Lincolnshire | Utterby–Ludborough boundary | 67.9 | 109.3 | A18 west – Immingham, Humber Bridge, Ludborough, North Ormsby | Eastern terminus of A18 |
| Lincolnshire | New Waltham | 74.6 | 120.1 | Louth Road (A1243 north) / Becklands Avenue – Scartho | Southern terminus of A1243 |
| Lincolnshire | New Waltham | 75.3 | 121.2 | A1098 north (Hewitt's Avenue) – Cleethorpes | Southern terminus of A1098 |
| Lincolnshire | Grimsby | 76.9 | 123.8 | A46 (Weelsby Road) – Cleethorpes, Lincoln | |
| Lincolnshire | Grimsby | 77.8 | 125.2 | Ellis Way / Frederick Ward Way (A1136) - Town centre | |
| Lincolnshire | Grimsby | 78.3 | 126.0 | A180 (Cleethorpe Road / Westgate) / Lockhill / M180 – Cleethorpes, Immingham | Northern terminus |
1.000 mi = 1.609 km; 1.000 km = 0.621 mi

== Future ==
=== Boston Distributor Road ===
There are demands for Boston to be bypassed. Therefore, Lincolnshire County Council have 'safeguarded' the corridor for the Boston Distributor Road.

== Incidents ==
There are multiple crashes on the A16, especially near Louth and Crowland.

== Spalding-Peterborough route change ==
=== Old route of the A16 ===
The route of the A16 changed following the completion of the new Spalding−Peterborough link road. The section between Spalding to the south of Crowland only, opened in August 2010; the remainder was completed in October 2011. The new route has taken the number A16, effectively linking the route with Peterborough, with the current road from Spalding to Stamford becoming the A1175.

=== A1073 road ===
This new section replaced the A1073 road, a road that ran between the former A16 at 52°45.5262′N 0°9.6174′W 0.81 miles (1.3 km) south of Spalding in Lincolnshire and the A47 between Eye and Eye Green at 52°36.7206′N 0°11.1378′W near Peterborough.

The A1073 route had become increasingly dangerous over the years because traffic usage had increased. It was narrow with many blind corners and slopes, and much of it was on an embankment with deep ditches either side and no run-off areas. There were dangerous junctions, particularly with the B1443 between Peakirk and Thorney, which formed a staggered crossroads. The road was a principal route servicing the food-processing industry in Spalding, bringing in supplies and moving products to the supermarket distribution system to the south.

An upgrade to the route had been under discussion for many years. The main hold-up was arguments over funding between the administrative counties of Lincolnshire, Cambridgeshire and the Department for Transport, exacerbated by the actions of a former Leader of Lincolnshire County Council who went to jail for seeking to influence the route to his own financial advantage. Eventually a route was agreed, avoiding Cowbit and Crowland and joining the A47 west of Eye, and in 2008 construction work began, originally due to be completed by Autumn 2010.

The Northern 8.3 miles (13.4 km) of the new route opened between Spalding and the roundabout south of Crowland in Autumn 2010, with the opening of the Southern 4.8 miles (7.7 km) delayed due to structural problems at the embankment at Car Dyke Bridge. On completion of remedial repairs and the opening of the Southern portion on 16 October 2011, the new road was renumbered to form part of the A16; the original A1073 alignment between Spalding and Eye Green became an unclassified local road.
