= Stickney, Lincolnshire =

Linear village and civil parish in the East Lindsey district of Lincolnshire, England

Coordinates: 53°5′24.64″N 0°0′18.21″E

Stickney
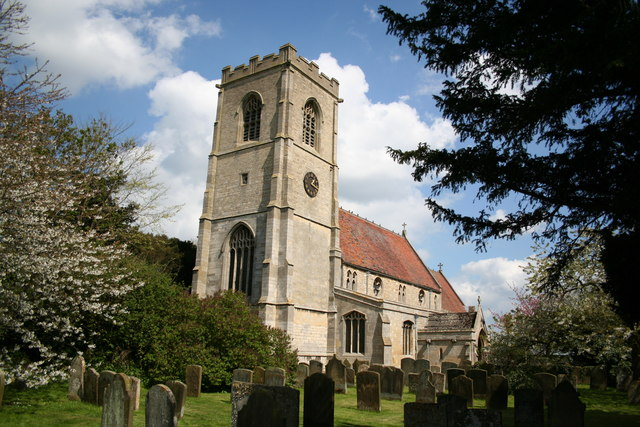
- St Luke's Church, Stickney

- Location within Lincolnshire
- Population: 1,127 (2011)
- OS grid reference: TF343566
  - London: 110 mi (180 km) S
- District: East Lindsey
- Shire county: Lincolnshire
- Region: East Midlands
- Country: England
- Sovereign state: United Kingdom
- Post town: BOSTON
- Postcode district: PE22
- Dialling code: 01205
- Police: Lincolnshire
- Fire: Lincolnshire
- Ambulance: East Midlands
- UK Parliament: Boston and Skegness

Stickney is a linear village and civil parish in the East Lindsey district of Lincolnshire, England. It was an ancient parish in the county. Its population has increased since late 20th-century immigration and is 1,127 as of 2011.

== Governance ==
An electoral ward in the same name exists. This ward stretches east to Eastville with a total population taken at the 2011 census of 2,357.

== Location and transport ==
Stickney is situated at the centre of the Lincolnshire Fens, 8 miles (13 km) north of Boston and 10 miles (16 km) south-east of Horncastle. The A16 road runs through it. The village postal address is Boston, although Stickney is not situated within Boston Borough.

The village is on a main bus route between Spilsby and Boston, which runs along the A16. It used to be served by an east–west railway line, but this closed in 1970. A transmitting station is located near Stickney Camp Site to the north.

== History ==
The place-name 'Stickney' is first attested in the Domesday Book of 1086, where it appears as Stichenai. The name means 'stick island', and is thought to refer to the linear shape of the village between two streams. The nearby Stickford similarly means 'stick ford'.

Stickney has been chiefly an agricultural community. The ancient 13th-century Anglican parish church is dedicated to Saint Luke and is a Grade II listed building. The parish dates to 1564 . A new chancel was built in 1853 and the rest of the church was restored in 1855. The tower was partly taken down in 1887 because of deterioration, but rebuilt in 1900.

Donations to the poor house and for care of the poor have been recorded since 1552 when William Hardy left a yearly rent charge of £1 6s. 8d. for the poor of the parish.

Stickney Church of England Primary School serves local children. Some progress to regional grammar schools, and others to the William Lovell Church of England Academy, the former William Lovell Secondary School, on Main Road. Lovell had established a free school in the parish in 1678. After the school was enlarged in 1879, pupils began paying an annual fee of £1 in 1881.

Local amenities have included a public house, the Rose and Crown House on the main road, which operated for about 100 years. As of 2012 it had closed and was for sale.

The Stickney War Memorial is dedicated to men from the village killed during World War I; their names are listed on the memorial. A photo of the memorial is shown at Genweb.

== Notable people ==
The French poet Paul Verlaine taught French and drawing for several months in 1875 at William Lovell's School before moving to Boston.
