= Æthelwine of Lindsey =

7th-century Bishop of Lindsey and saint

Æthelwine
- Bishop of Lindsey
- Appointed: c. 680
- Term ended: c. 700
- Predecessor: Eadhæd
- Successor: Edgar

Orders
- Consecration: c. 680

Personal details
- Died: c. 700
- Denomination: Christian

Sainthood
- Feast day: 3 May or 20 June

Æthelwine (Note: Or Ethelwine or Elwin) (died c. 700) was the second bishop of Lindsey from around 680, and is regarded as a saint.

Other than a couple of references in Bede's Historia to Æthelwine and his family, very little is known of him. One brother, named Edilhun (i.e. Æthelhun), a "youth of great capacity of the English nobility", is said by Bede to have died of the plague while visiting a monastery in Ireland in the year 664. Another brother, Aldwin, was abbot at Partney, and a sister, Æthelhild, was an abbess. Bede tells of her visiting Queen Osthryth at Bardney Abbey in about 697. She was still alive when Bede was writing in the 720s.

Æthelwine probably died around 700. His feast day is 3 May or 29 June. The even less well evidenced Saint Aldwyn is sometimes identified with his brother.

== Citations ==
Christian titles
Preceded by Eadhæd	Bishop of Lindsey c. 680-c. 700	Succeeded by Edgar
