= Sibsey railway station =

Former railway station in Lincolnshire, England

Coordinates: 53.0349°N 0.0262°E

Sibsey
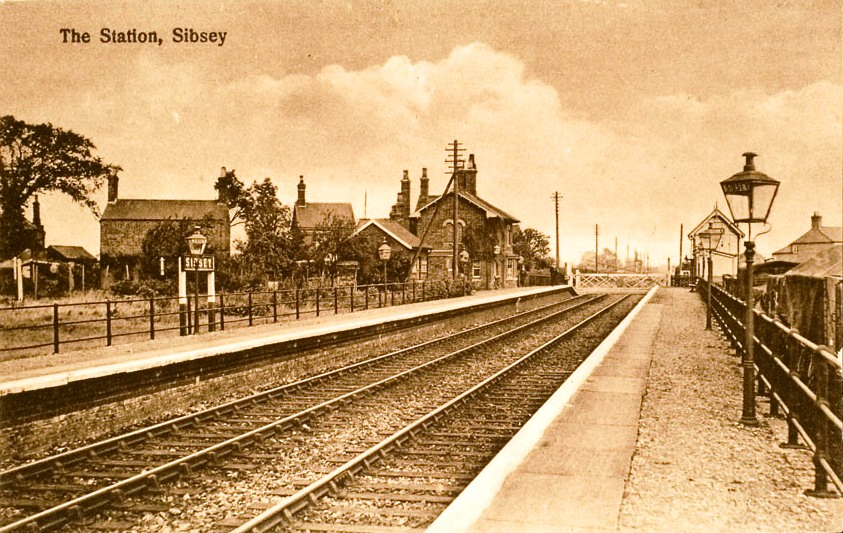

General information
- Location: Sibsey, Boston; England
- Platforms: 2

Other information
- Status: Disused

History
- Original company: East Lincolnshire Railway
- Pre-grouping: Great Northern Railway
- Post-grouping: London and North Eastern Railway; Eastern Region of British Railways

Key dates
- 2 October 1848: Opened
- 11 September 1961: Closed to passenger traffic
- 15 June 1964: Closed to goods traffic
Location

Sibsey was a railway station on the East Lincolnshire Railway which served the village of Sibsey in Lincolnshire between 1848 and 1964. Withdrawal of passenger services took place in 1961, followed by goods facilities in 1964. The line through the station remains in use as part of the Poacher Line between Boston and Skegness.

== History ==
The station was opened on 2 October 1848. It was constructed by Peto and Betts civil engineering contractors who, in January 1848, had taken over the contract to construct the section of the East Lincolnshire Railway between Louth and Boston from John Waring and Sons. This section was the last to be completed in September 1848 at an agreed cost of £123,000 (equivalent to £15,600,000 in 2023). The village of Sibsey lay to the north-west of the line; at the time, it was a small settlement on the Horncastle Road. A four-road goods yard facing Boston was provided and this was extended by the mid-1920s to seven roads, later eight. The Great Northern Railway acquired extra land around the station to facilitate the expansion, which was necessary to cope with the increasing potato and sugar beet traffic.

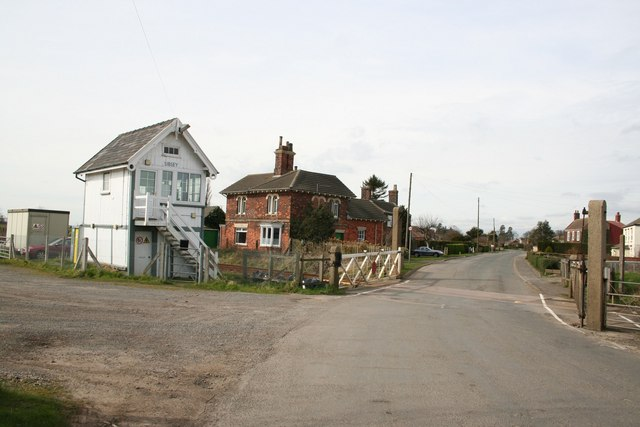
Station in 2007.

During the interwar period, Sibsey dealt with up to 80 wagons of potatoes or beet a day. A goods service drawn by a Class K2 or J6 departed Skegness at 3.30pm and collected potato and beet wagons from Havenhouse, Wainfleet and Thorpe Culvert. They were brought to Sibsey to be marshalled with existing wagons before being despatched to Boston at 4.45pm. During the 1920s, two potato trains ran at night from Sibsey: one to Bradford and the other to Ardsley. At the time, five up and down passenger services, and one Sunday service each way, called at Sibsey. The station was closed to passengers on 11 September 1961 and to goods traffic on 15 June 1964.

Preceding station	Historical railways	Following station
Old Leake; Line open, station closed	Great Northern Railway; East Lincolnshire Line	Boston; Line and station open

== Present day ==
The line through the station continues to be used by services on the Poacher Line between Grantham and Skegness. Sibsey Station house was sold in 1964 and partly converted to a private house, and remained in the same hands until 2017 when it was sold again, and completely renovated. The goods office remains largely untouched. The platforms have been demolished.

== Sources ==
- Butt, R. V. J. (October 1995). The Directory of Railway Stations: details every public and private passenger station, halt, platform and stopping place, past and present (1st ed.). Sparkford: Patrick Stephens Ltd. ISBN 978-1-85260-508-7. OCLC 60251199. OL 11956311M.
- Clinker, C.R. (October 1978). Clinker's Register of Closed Passenger Stations and Goods Depots in England, Scotland and Wales 1830-1977. Bristol: Avon-Anglia Publications & Services. ISBN 0-905466-19-5.
- Ludlam, A.J. (1991). The East Lincolnshire Railway (Locomotive Papers No. 82). Headington, Oxford: The Oakwood Press. ISBN 0-85361-416-4.
- Conolly, W. Philip (2004) [1958]. British Railways Pre-Grouping Atlas and Gazetteer. Hersham, Surrey: Ian Allan Ltd. ISBN 978-0-7110-0320-0.
