= Fotherby Halt railway station =

Former railway station in Lincolnshire, England

Coordinates: 53.4048°N 0.0156°W

Fotherby Halt
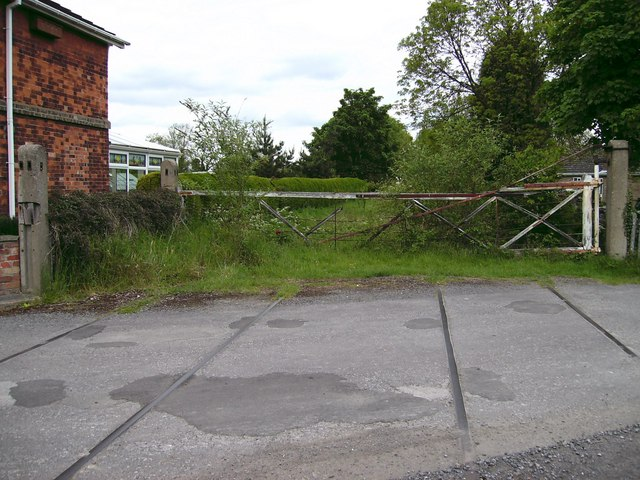
- Station site in 2007.

General information
- Location: Fotherby, East Lindsey; England
- Platforms: 2

Other information
- Status: Disused

History
- Original company: East Lincolnshire Railway
- Pre-grouping: Great Northern Railway
- Post-grouping: London and North Eastern Railway; Eastern Region of British Railways

Key dates
- February 1853: Opened as Fotherby Gate House
- 28 June 1872: Closed
- 11 December 1905: Reopened and renamed
- 11 September 1961: Closed
- December 1980: Closure of line
Location

Fotherby Halt was a railway halt on the East Lincolnshire Railway which served the village of Fotherby in Lincolnshire between 1905 and 1961. The station was opened on the site of a previous station named Fotherby Gate House which had closed in 1872. The second station closed in 1961, but the line through it remained open for freight until December 1980. The line through the station could be reopened by the Lincolnshire Wolds Railway as part of its extension south from Ludborough to Louth.

== History ==
The station was opened in February 1853 as Fotherby Gate House, some five years after the East Lincolnshire Railway between Grimsby and Louth had opened on 1 March 1848. The origins of the station's name lay in the gatehouse constructed in 1847 by contractor John Waring and Sons of Rotherham to control the crossing over Peppin Lane near Fotherby, to the south of which the station lay. It was served by a twice-weekly passenger service restricted to market days. This reduced its patronage to such an extent that it was closed on 28 June 1872, but remained in public timetables until October 1872.

The station was reopened on 11 December 1905 as Fotherby Halt to coincide with the introduction of a motor train service by the Great Northern Railway. It consisted of two low parallel halt platforms to the south of the level crossing; a crossing box (the block section being Ludborough-Louth North) was sited at the northern end of the up platform next to the crossing and opposite Fotherby gatehouse which served as the crossing keeper's cottage. Passenger services called at the station upon request only. The station closed on 11 September 1961, the same day as Utterby Halt.

Historical railways
Utterby Halt; Line and station closed	Great Northern Railway; East Lincolnshire Line	Louth; Line and station closed
Preceding station	Heritage railways	Following station
Planned extensions
Ludborough towards North Thoresby	Lincolnshire Wolds Railway	Louth North Terminus

== Present day ==
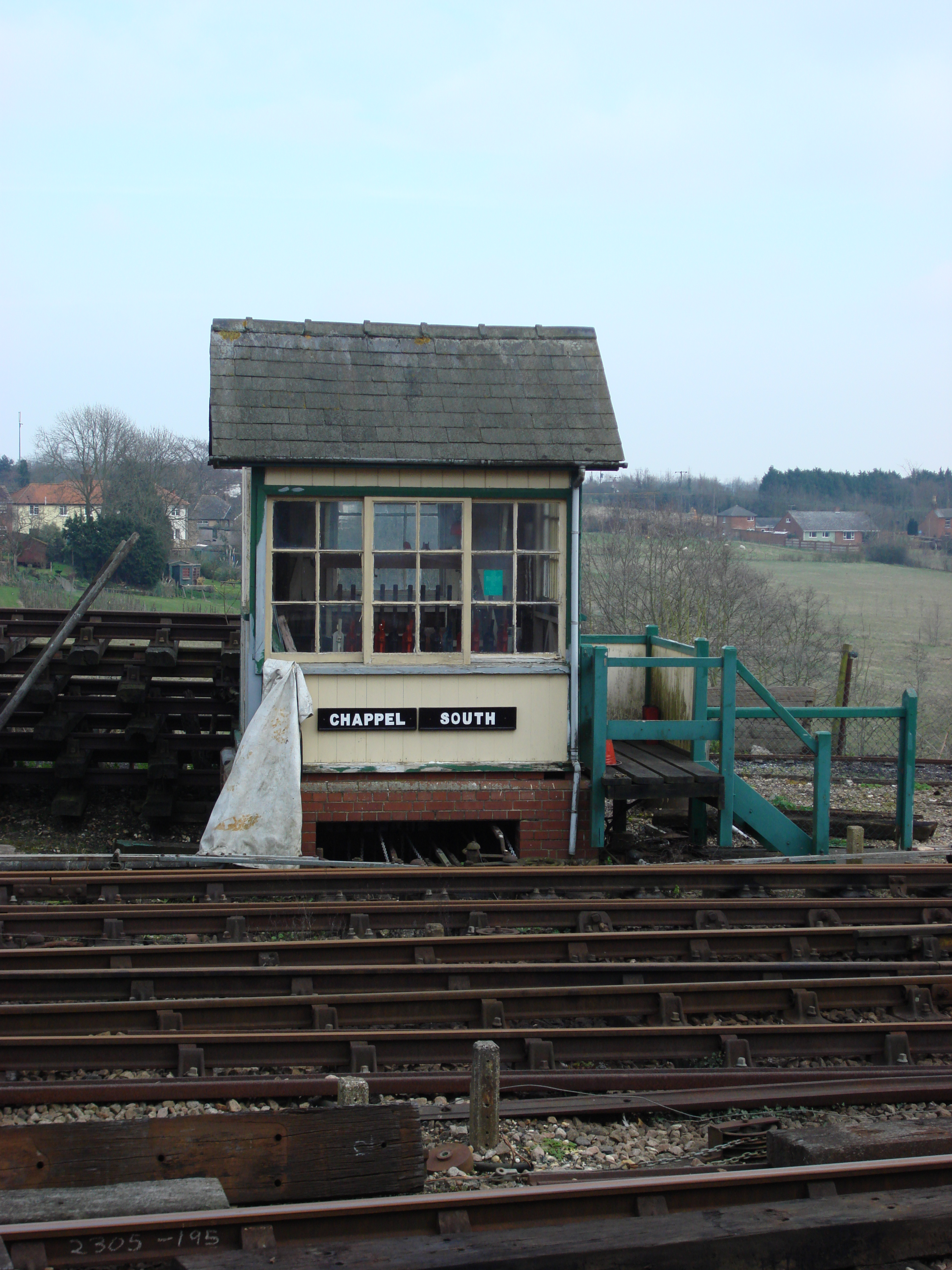
Former Fotherby gate box, now at the East Anglian Railway Museum.

The halt was demolished by British Rail long before final closure of the line in December 1980 and little remains of it today. The crossing keeper's cottage survives in good condition as a private residence, but the original windows have given way to upvc replacements. The rails remain embedded in the tarmac over Peppin Lane and an old signal stands over the trackbed to the south towards Louth. The gate box was moved to Chappel and Wakes Colne railway station in 1985 as part of the East Anglian Railway Museum.

On 28 September 1991, the Lincolnshire Wolds Railway obtained the Grimsby and Louth Light Railway Order 1991 (SI 1991/2210) authorising the reinstatement of the East Lincolnshire Railway between Waltham and the former Keddington Road level crossing near Louth, which would include the line through Fotherby.

== Sources ==
- Butt, R. V. J. (October 1995). The Directory of Railway Stations: details every public and private passenger station, halt, platform and stopping place, past and present (1st ed.). Sparkford: Patrick Stephens Ltd. ISBN 978-1-85260-508-7. OCLC 60251199. OL 11956311M.
- Clinker, C.R. (October 1978). Clinker's Register of Closed Passenger Stations and Goods Depots in England, Scotland and Wales 1830-1977. Bristol: Avon-Anglia Publications & Services. ISBN 0-905466-19-5.
- Ludlam, A.J. (1991). The East Lincolnshire Railway (OL82). Headington, Oxford: The Oakwood Press. ISBN 0-85361-416-4.
- Conolly, W. Philip (2004) [1958]. British Railways Pre-Grouping Atlas and Gazetteer. Hersham, Surrey: Ian Allan Ltd. ISBN 978-0-7110-0320-0.
- Stennett, Alan (2007). Lost Railways of Lincolnshire. Newbury, Berkshire: Countryside Books. ISBN 978-1-84674-040-4.
