= Sibsey =

Village, civil parish, and electoral ward in Lincolnshire, England

Coordinates: 53.037137°N 0.016272°E

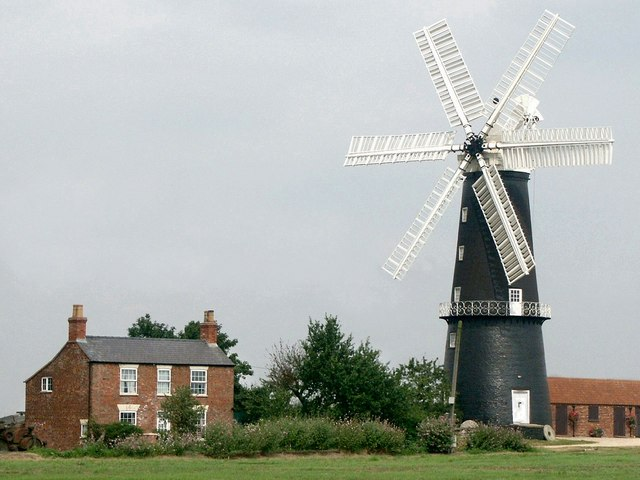
- Sibsey Trader Mill

- Location within Lincolnshire
- Population: 1,979 (2011)
- OS grid reference: TF352507
  - London: 110 mi (180 km) S
- District: East Lindsey
- Shire county: Lincolnshire
- Region: East Midlands
- Country: England
- Sovereign state: United Kingdom
- Post town: Boston
- Postcode district: PE22
- Dialling code: 01205
- Police: Lincolnshire
- Fire: Lincolnshire
- Ambulance: East Midlands
- UK Parliament: Boston and Skegness

Sibsey is a village, civil parish and electoral ward in the East Lindsey district of Lincolnshire, England. It is situated at the junction of the A16 and B1184 roads, 4 miles (6.4 km) north from Boston. Sibsey Northlands is to the north of the village. The Prime Meridian passes just to the west of Sibsey, crossing the Stone Bridge Drain canal. At the 2001 census, Sibsey had a population of 1,996, reducing to 1,979 at the 2011 Census.

Set in the fens of Lincolnshire, Sibsey is a focus of the farming community. The village is surrounded by farmland. The village won an award for best-kept village in 1989. The village has a village hall, a post office with shop, and a public house, the White Hart, on Main Road. Although the postal address for residences includes nearby Boston, it is not in that borough.

== History ==
The earliest mention of Sibsey is in the Domesday Book of 1086, where it is called Sibolci. It had a total of 77 households, 6 ploughlands (approximately 720 acres), 120 acres of meadow, and a church. Ivo Tallboys (or Taillebois) was lord and tenant-in-chief in 1086. In 1066, the lord was Stori of Bolingbroke.

== Geography ==
On the A16 near High Ferry Lane, on Sunday September 19 1999, a white 2-litre Ford Sierra was being driven erratically. A motorist phoned Lincolnshire Police, who followed the car for four minutes. The Ford Sierra was driven at high speeds of 90mph, and ploughed straight into an articulated truck in the opposite direction, at around 5.50am. The 14 year old driver, Graham Bellamy of Capmartin Road in Radford who attended Barr's Hill School, was killed instantly. It was his mother's car. Billy Loudon, of Radford Road who attended President Kennedy School, died in the Pilgrim Hospital. There were six other boys aged 11-14, from Coventry, who had visited the Lincolnshire coast, including Graham's 11 year old brother Gary. The inquest took place in May 2000.

== Demography ==
Population of Sibsey Civil Parish
Year	1801	1811	1821	1831	1841	1851	1881	1891	1901	1911	1921	1931	1961	2001	2011	2021
Population	948	1,151	1,354	1,364	1,431	1,316	1,204	1,101	1,029	1,004	1,063	1,026	1,023	1,996	1,979	2,014

== Landmarks ==
=== The Sibsey Trader Mill ===
Sibsey's most prominent feature is the Grade I listed and scheduled Sibsey Trader Mill. This six-storey windmill, which was built to replace an earlier post mill, has six sails and was completed in 1877 by Sanderson and Son of Louth. In 1954 it ceased working under wind-power, and fell into disuse. It was restored to working order with engine-driven mill stones in 1981, and is under the guardianship of English Heritage. It operated until 2018 when it was damaged in gales, necessitating a further restoration project including replacement of the cap, fantail and sails, and remains closed.

The mill should not be confused with a non-working red brick Grade II listed windmill on the eastern side of the A16.

=== St Margaret's Church ===
The medieval church, made up of work from the 12th to 16th centuries, is a Grade I listed building, and is dedicated to Saint Margaret. The church has a square, Early English Period tower at the western end. It was completely restored in 1840, and the chancel rebuilt and nave and aisles partly rebuilt in 1855. The remains of the churchyard cross, located near the porch, is Grade II listed, and a scheduled monument. Today it is part of a group of parishes, Sibsey with Frithville, with a varied pattern of worship and community activity across three parish churches. The churchyard has an avenue of lime trees and parts are set aside as wildlife sanctuary.

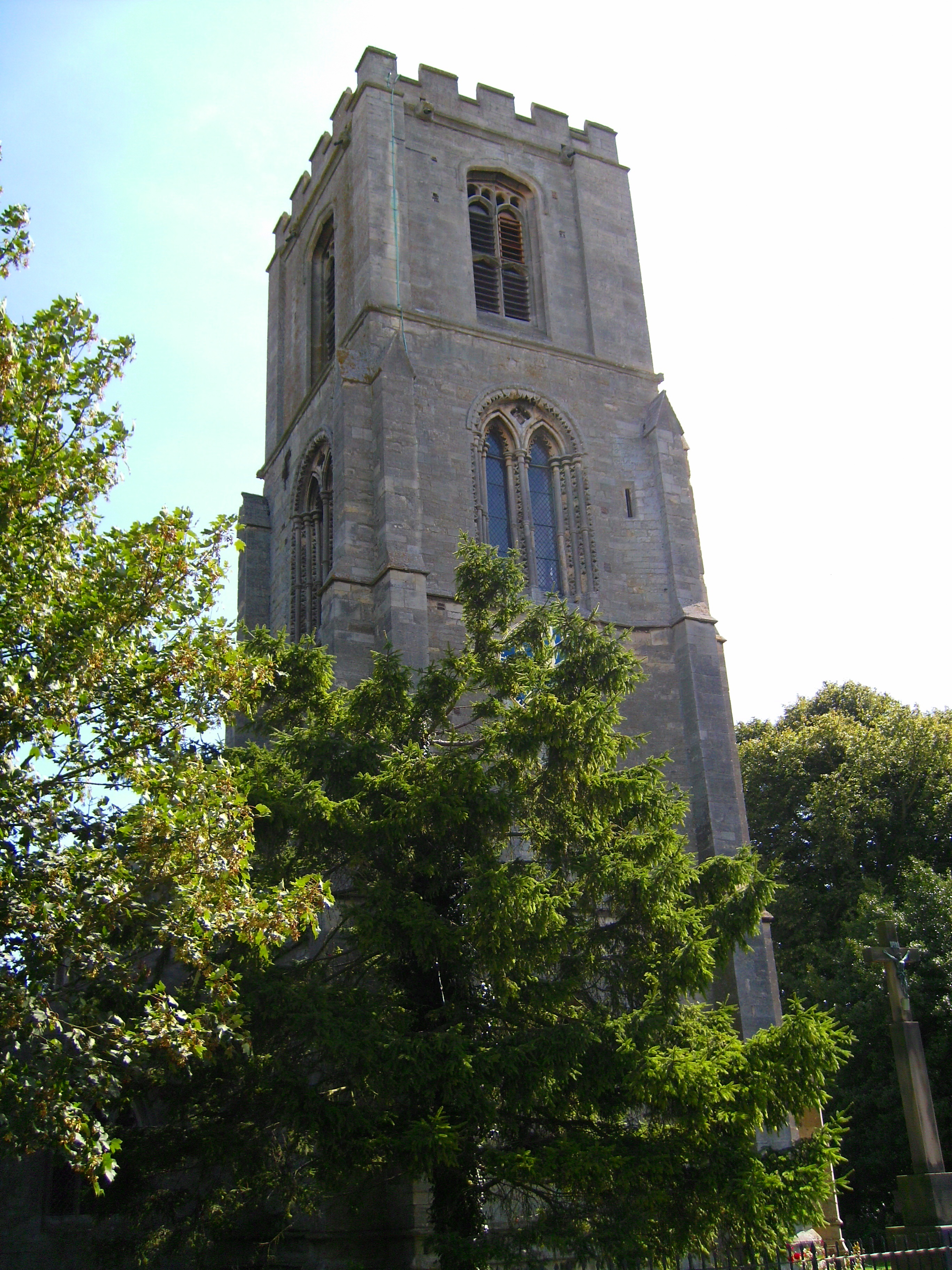
Western tower of the church.

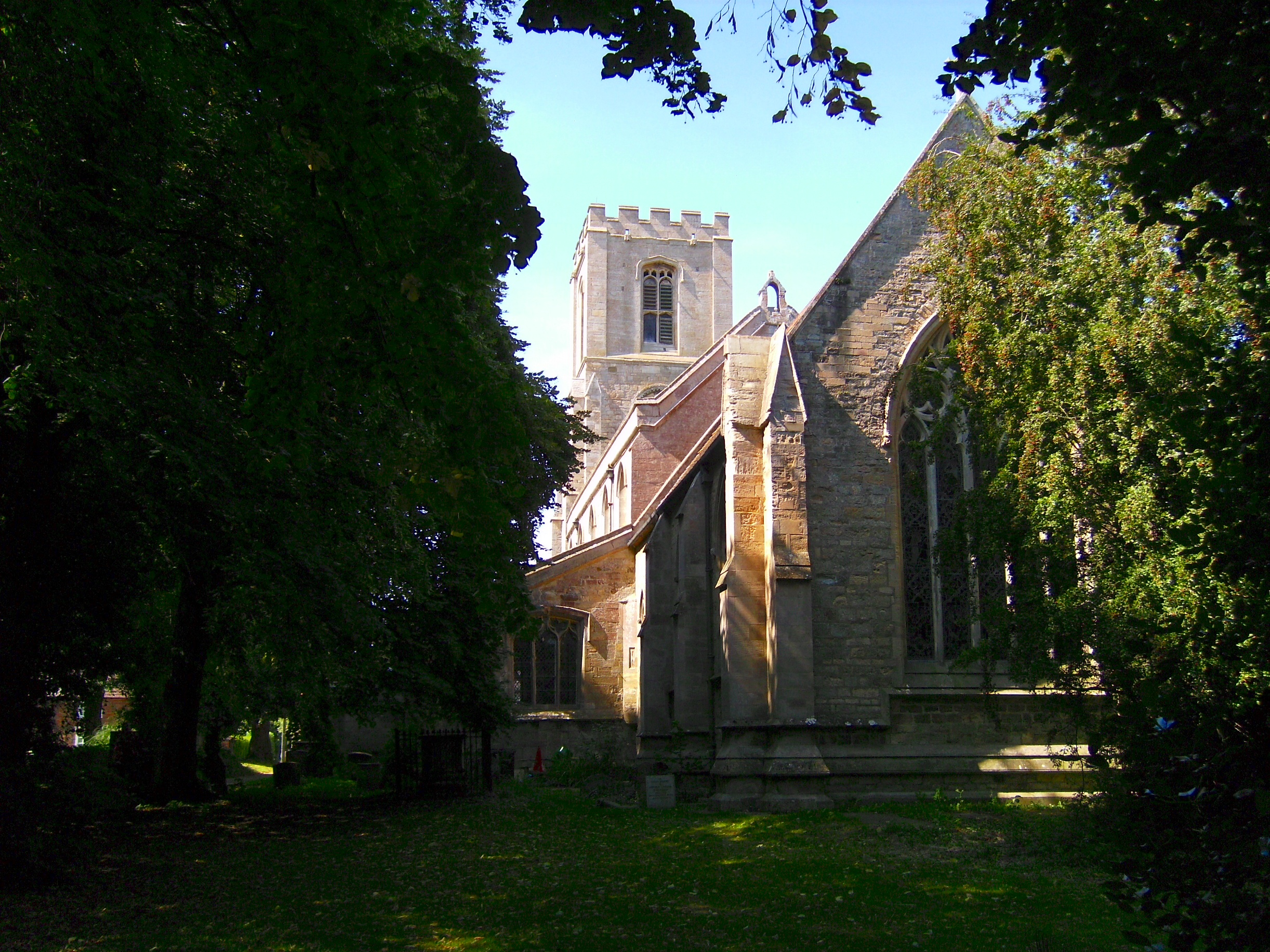
View of church from east, through the edge of its lime avenue.

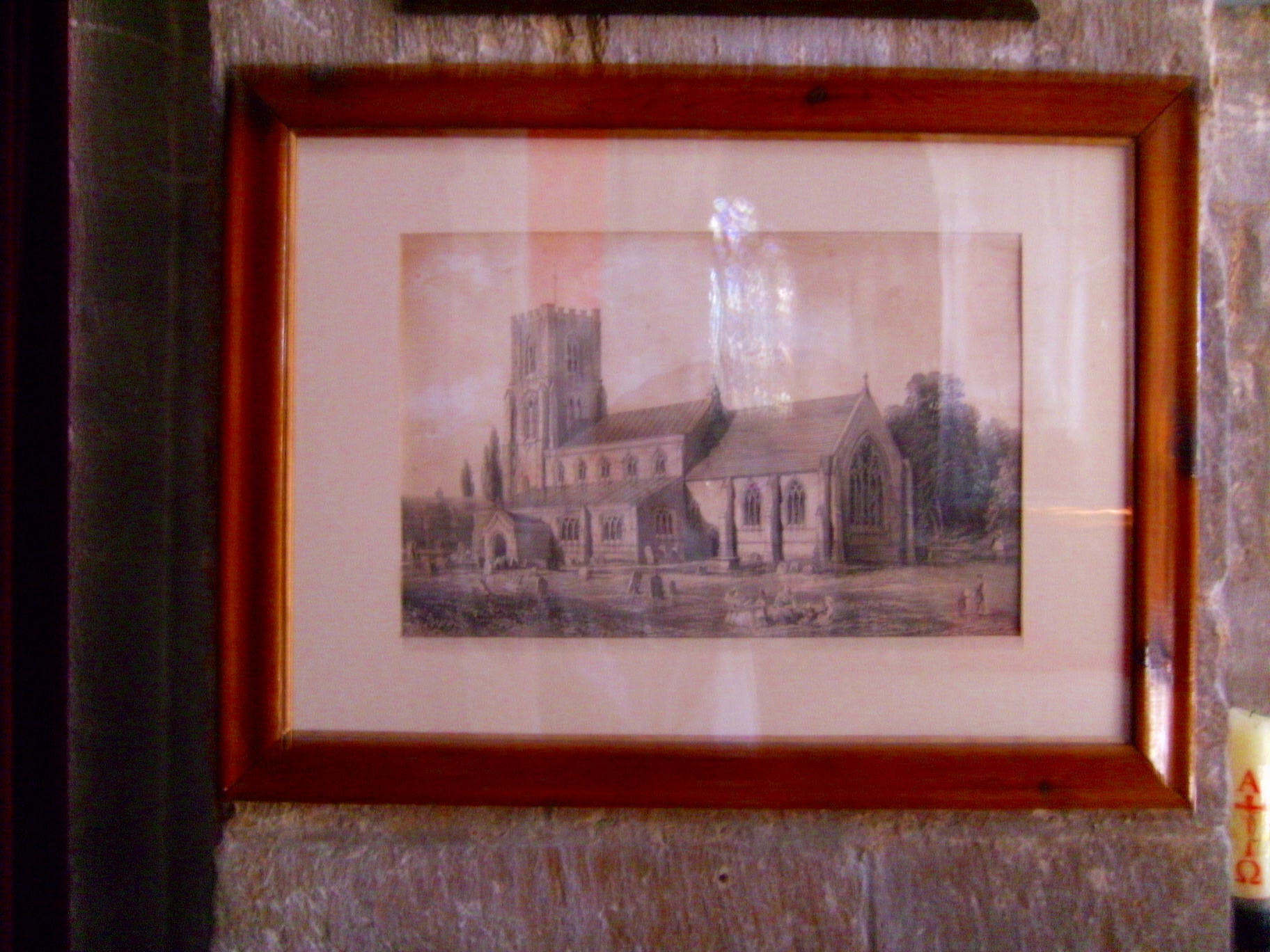
Sketch, perhaps Victorian, showing church before more recent tree planting.

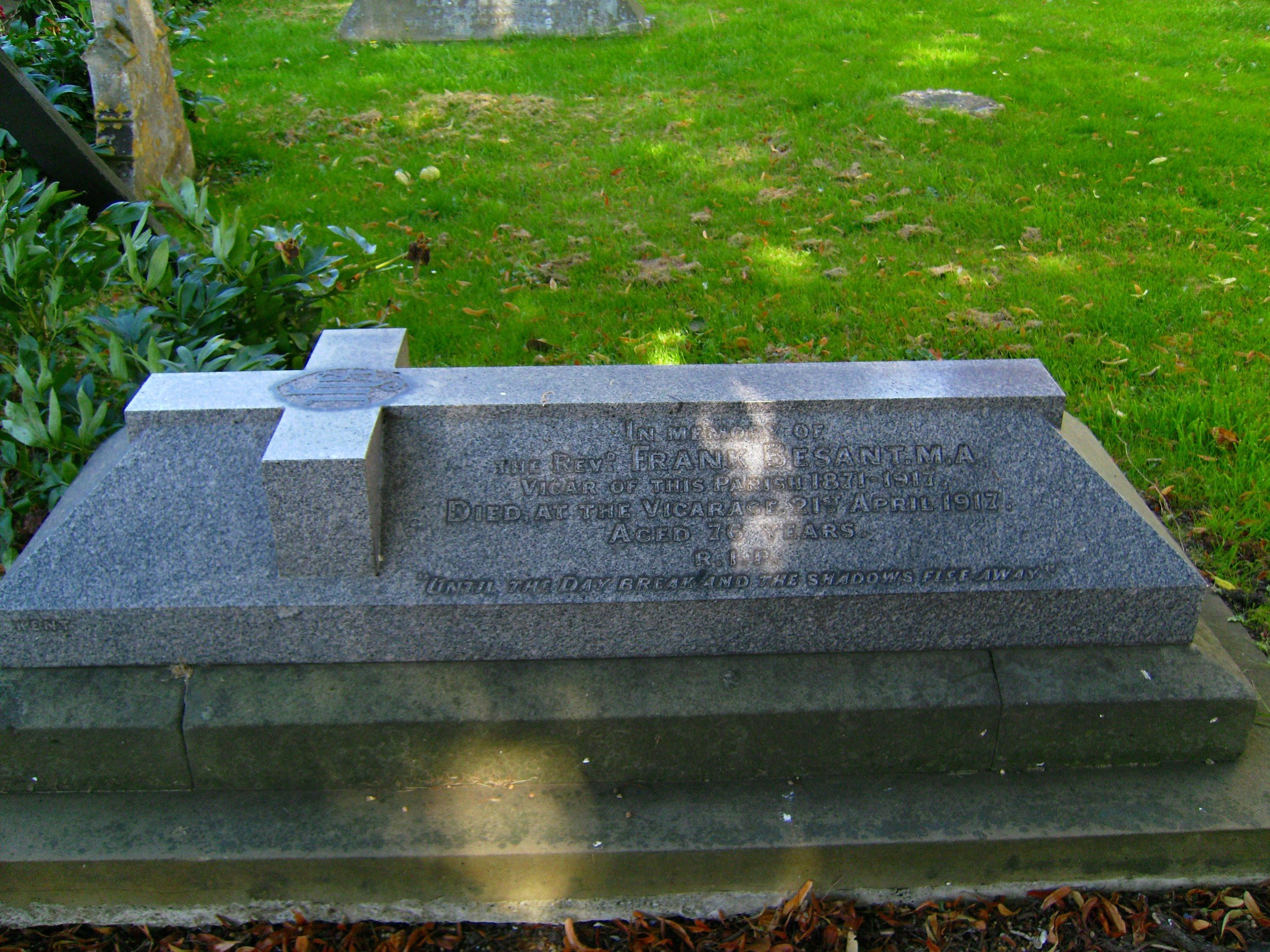
Grave of Frank Besant, by the west entrance to the churchyard.

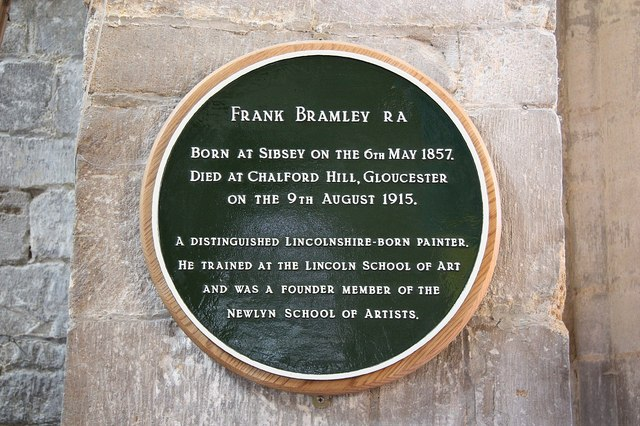
Frank Bramley plaque.

== Transport ==
In 1848 the East Lincolnshire Railway opened Sibsey railway station, which closed in 1961. The Grantham to Skegness Line passes still close to the south-east of the village with level crossings over the B1184 and A16.

== Education ==
Although now maintained by Lincolnshire County Council, the primary school had a long history as an independent, locally supported institution. Founded in 1733, the school spent a century in leased accommodation before being rebuilt in 1869 – a structure that lasted until the school was largely rebuilt in 1996.

== Notable people ==
Frank Bramley, the post-impressionist artist, and Arthur Lucan, comic actor, were born at Sibsey. Annie Besant, the social reformer and Theosophist lived at Sibsey during her marriage to Rev. Frank Besant. Alec Brader, professional footballer, schoolteacher and youth athletics coach lived at Sibsey.

== See also ==
- Hilldyke, Lincolnshire
- Sibsey Rural District
