= Old Leake railway station =

Former railway station in Lincolnshire, England

Old Leake
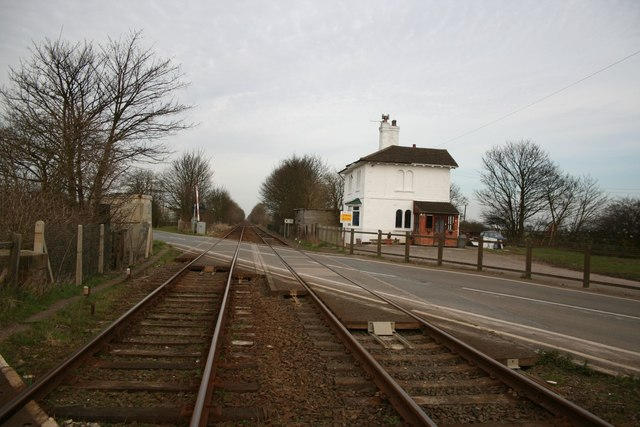
- Station in 2007

General information
- Location: Old Leake, Boston; England
- Coordinates: 53.0542°N 0.0519°E
- Platforms: 2

Other information
- Status: Disused

History
- Original company: East Lincolnshire Railway
- Pre-grouping: Great Northern Railway
- Post-grouping: London and North Eastern Railway; Eastern Region of British Railways

Key dates
- 2 October 1848: Opened as Hob Hole
- November 1848: Renamed Leake and Wrangle
- 1 October 1849: Renamed Old Leake and Wrangle
- October 1852: Renamed Old Leake
- 17 September 1956: Closed to passenger traffic
- 15 June 1964: Closed to goods traffic
Location

Old Leake was a railway station on the East Lincolnshire Railway which served the village of Old Leake in Lincolnshire between 1848 and 1964. It originally opened as Hob Hole and was renamed three times within the first five years of opening. Withdrawal of passenger services took place in 1956, followed by goods facilities in 1964. The line through the station remains in use as the Poacher Line.

== History ==
The station was opened on 2 October 1848 as Hob Hole, but was renamed one month later as Leake and Wrangle. The name changed again less than one year later in October 1849 to Old Leake and Wrangle, before becoming simply Old Leake in October 1852. The village of Old Leake lay to the east of the line, whilst Wrangle is 1½ miles to the north-west. The station was constructed by Peto and Betts civil engineering contractors who, in January 1848, had taken over the contract to construct the section of the East Lincolnshire Railway between Louth and Boston from John Waring and Sons. This section was the last to be completed in September 1848 at an agreed cost of £123,000 (£15.6 million in 2023). At the time, Old Leake village consisted of little more than an inn and the station itself. The July 1922 timetable saw five up and four down services, and one Sunday service each way, call at Old Leake. The station was closed to passengers on 17 September 1956 and to goods traffic on 15 June 1964.

Preceding station	Historical railways	Following station
East Ville; Line open, station closed	Great Northern Railway; East Lincolnshire Line	Sibsey; Line open, station closed

== Present day ==
The line through the station continues to be used by services on the Poacher Line between Grantham and Skegness.

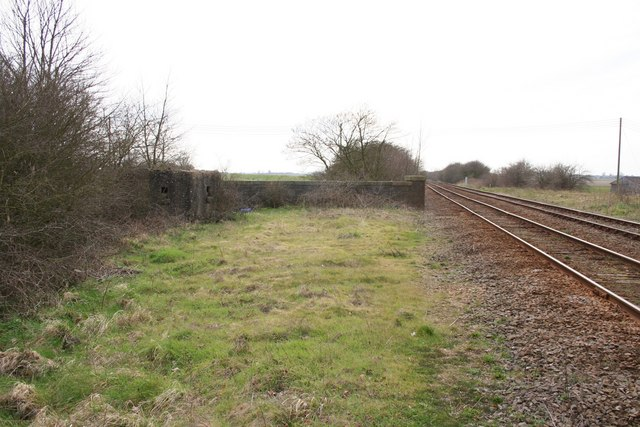
The original station name was taken from the Hob Hole Drain, which the line crosses south of the station

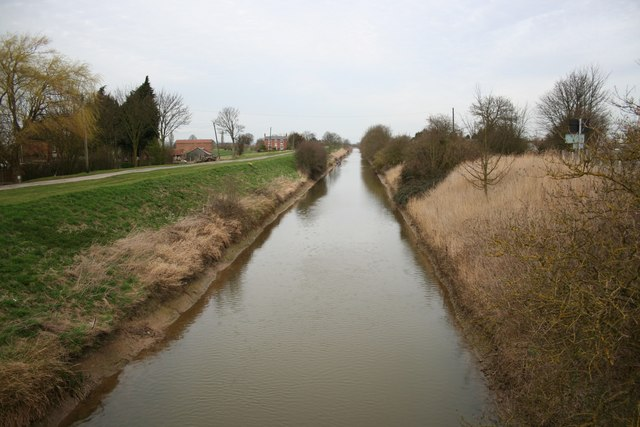
Hobhole drain seen from the railwaybridge

== Sources ==
- Butt, R. V. J. (October 1995). The Directory of Railway Stations: details every public and private passenger station, halt, platform and stopping place, past and present (1st ed.). Sparkford: Patrick Stephens Ltd. ISBN 978-1-85260-508-7. OCLC 60251199. OL 11956311M.
- Clinker, C.R. (October 1978). Clinker's Register of Closed Passenger Stations and Goods Depots in England, Scotland and Wales 1830-1977. Bristol: Avon-Anglia Publications & Services. ISBN 0-905466-19-5.
- Ludlam, A.J. (1991). The East Lincolnshire Railway (Locomotive Papers No. 82). Headington, Oxford: The Oakwood Press. ISBN 0-85361-416-4.
- Conolly, W. Philip (2004) [1958]. British Railways Pre-Grouping Atlas and Gazetteer. Hersham, Surrey: Ian Allan Ltd. ISBN 978-0-7110-0320-0.
