= Eadhæd =

7th-century Bishop of Lindsey and Bishop of Ripon

- Bishop of Ripon
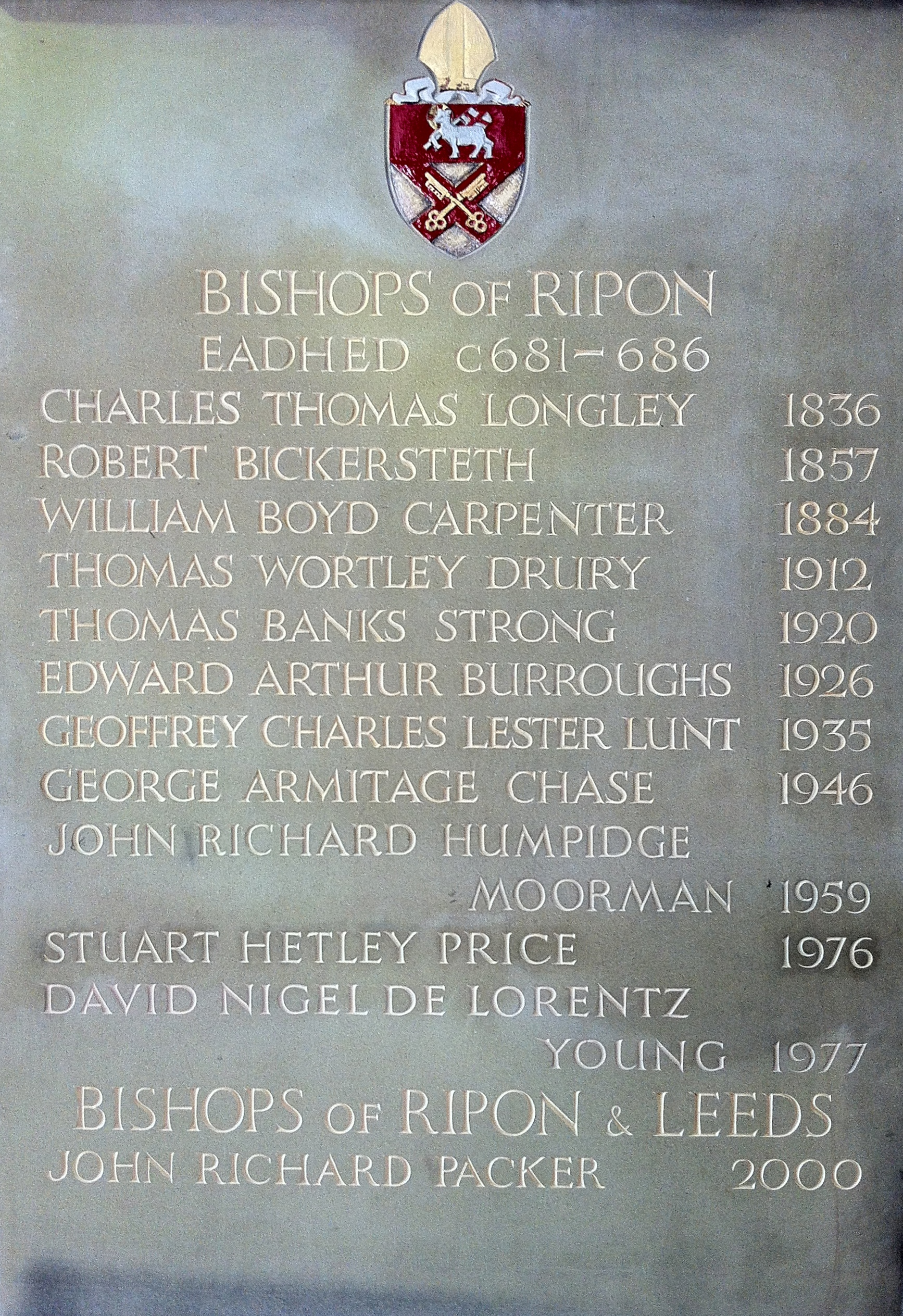
- List of bishops at Ripon Cathedral
- In office: c. 679
- Predecessor: new foundation
- Successor: united to York
- Previous post: Bishop of Lindsey

Orders
- Consecration: 678

Personal details
- Denomination: Chalcedonian Christianity

Eadhæd (Note: Also attested in the Latinized Eadhedus, or Eadheath or Eadhaed.) was a medieval Bishop of Lindsey, and the sole Bishop of Ripon in the medieval era.

Eadhæd was a companion of Chad of Mercia. He was consecrated in 678. He was expelled from Lindsey and was made Bishop of Ripon around 679. This was part of the process whereby Bishop Wilfrid of York's large diocese was broken into three parts, with new bishoprics established at York, Hexham and Ripon. Along with Eadhæd, Bosa was appointed to York and Eata was appointed to Hexham. The medieval chronicler Bede, in his work Historia ecclesiastica gentis Anglorum, barely mentions Eadhæd outside of the division of the diocese. It appears that the see of Ripon was especially created to find a place for Eadhæd after his expulsion from Lindsey, for bishops were not usually appointed to that see.

== Citations ==
Church of England titles
New title New foundation	Bishop of Lindsey; 678–c. 679	Succeeded by Æthelwine
New title new foundation	Bishop of Ripon; 679–?	united to York
