= Walmsgate =

Hamlet in Lincolnshire, England

Coordinates: 53.284499°N 0.045612°E

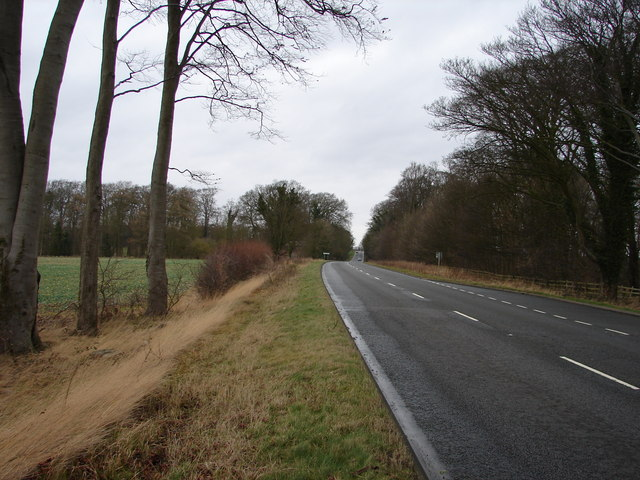
- Approaching Walmsgate on the A16

- Location within Lincolnshire
- Population: 21 (2021 census)
- OS grid reference: TF364783
  - London: 120 mi (190 km) S
- Civil parish: Walmsgate
- District: East Lindsey
- Shire county: Lincolnshire
- Region: East Midlands
- Country: England
- Sovereign state: United Kingdom
- Post town: Louth
- Postcode district: LN11
- Police: Lincolnshire
- Fire: Lincolnshire
- Ambulance: East Midlands
- UK Parliament: Louth and Horncastle (UK Parliament constituency)

Walmsgate is a settlement and civil parish, in the East Lindsey district of Lincolnshire, England. It is situated on the A16 road, 6 miles (10 km) south-east from Louth. In 2021 the parish had a population of 21.

The name 'Walmsgate' means 'point of land of a man named Waldmaer'.

The lost village of Walmsgate is mentioned in 1377. A priest was last instituted about 1435, and eight families remained in 1563. The small church was still standing in the early 17th century. The walls of the church still stand to a maximum height of 6 feet (1.8 m) and are covered with a dense growth of ivy. The limestone ruins of the church are Grade II listed.
