= Utterby =

Village and civil parish in the East Lindsey district of Lincolnshire, England

Coordinates: 53.420786°N 0.031543°W

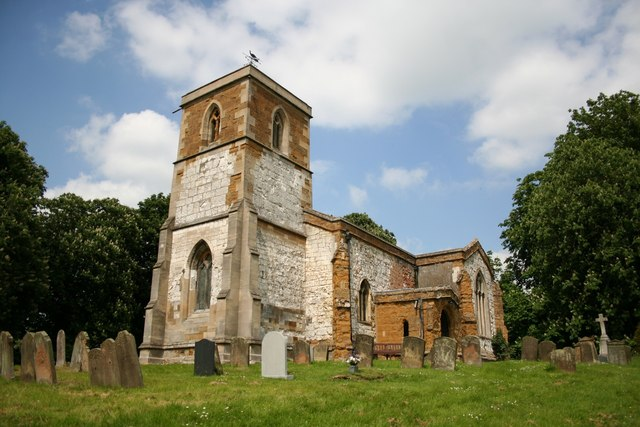
- St Andrew's Church, Utterby

- Location within Lincolnshire
- Population: 293 (2011)
- OS grid reference: TF309933
  - London: 140 mi (230 km) S
- District: East Lindsey
- Shire county: Lincolnshire
- Region: East Midlands
- Country: England
- Sovereign state: United Kingdom
- Post town: LOUTH
- Postcode district: LN11
- Dialling code: 01472
- Police: Lincolnshire
- Fire: Lincolnshire
- Ambulance: East Midlands
- UK Parliament: Louth and Horncastle

Utterby is a village and civil parish in the East Lindsey district of Lincolnshire, England. It is situated on the A16 road, 10 miles (16 km) south from Grimsby and 4 miles (6 km) north from Louth.

Utterby railway station (or Utterby Halt), on the line between Grimsby and Louth, closed in 1961. Near to the Village is the site of a former Gilbertine priory. It is believed that the monks of this priory built the village's Packhorse bridge in the fourteenth century.

The Greenwich Meridian passes to the east of Utterby.

== Toponymy ==
The name Utterby comes from the Scandinavian 'by' which means village, and is a common place name suffix in the area. The 'utter' comes from the Old English 'uttera', cognate with the modern English word 'outer', or remote, and not the modern Swedish 'utter' which means otter. Therefore, to the Vikings this was 'the remote village'. This is a common construction also seen in Itterby, one of the parishes which formed Cleethorpes, and also Ytterby in Sweden, which is relatively frequent in Scandinavia and from which derive the names of the Chemical elements Yttrium, Ytterbium, Terbium and Erbium.
