= Aldwyn of Coln =

Anglo-Saxon saint

Aldwyn is an Anglo-Saxon saint. The village of Coln St Aldwyn in Gloucestershire is generally supposed to be named after him.

In Bede's Historia ecclesiastica gentis Anglorum, an Aldwyn is mentioned who was abbot of Partney. According to Bede he was the brother of Saint Æthelwine, who became bishop of Lindsey from around 680, and of Æthelhild, abbess of a monastery nearby. There is no indication that this is the saint of Coln, but it is possible.
