= William Lovell Church of England Academy =

Location
- Main Road; Stickney, Lincolnshire, PE22 8AA; England; 53.09109°N 0.00291°E

Information
- Type: Academy
- Religious affiliation: Church of England
- Department for Education URN: 138756 Tables
- Ofsted: Reports
- Gender: Coeducational
- Age: 11 to 16
- Website: http://www.williamlovell.co.uk

William Lovell Church of England Academy (formerly William Lovell Church of England School, William Lovell Secondary School) is a coeducational Church of England secondary school with academy status, located in Stickney in the English county of Lincolnshire.

== History ==
William Lovell Secondary Modern opened in July 1959, costing £96,000 It was officially opened by Bishop of Lincoln, Kenneth Riches, on Thursday 31 March 1960.

It was previously a voluntary controlled school administered by Lincolnshire County Council, William Lovell Church of England School converted to academy status on 1 September 2012 and was renamed William Lovell Church of England Academy. However, the school continues to coordinate with Lincolnshire County Council for admissions.

It is a branch of the school provided for by a trust set up under the terms of William Lovell's will in 1678. The revised trust deed (dating from 1926) states that "the School of the Foundation shall continue to be maintained as a Public Elementary School, and religious instruction in accordance with the doctrines of the Church of England shall be given therein". Today the school is supported by the Church of England Diocese of Lincoln.

== Partnerships ==
The William Lovel Secondary-School was a partner school of the Staatliche Realschule Annweiler in Annweiler am Trifels, Rhineland-Palatinate, Germany.

== Notable staff members ==
- The poet Paul Verlaine taught French and art at William Lovell's school in 1875.
- Alec Brader was an English professional footballer and youth athletics coach taught PE, Geography, European Studies, and served as Deputy Headmaster.
