= Keal Cotes =

Small linear village in East Lindsey district of Lincolnshire, England

Coordinates: 53.125°N 00.038°E

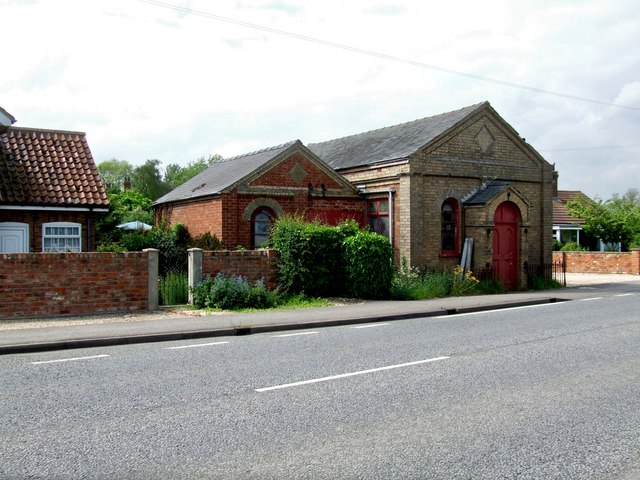
- Former Wesleyan Chapel, Keal Cotes in 2007

- Location within Lincolnshire
- Population: 327 (2011)
- OS grid reference: TF365611
  - London: 110 mi (180 km) S
- Civil parish: West Keal
- District: East Lindsey
- Shire county: Lincolnshire
- Region: East Midlands
- Country: England
- Sovereign state: United Kingdom
- Post town: SPILSBY
- Postcode district: PE23
- Dialling code: 01790
- Police: Lincolnshire
- Fire: Lincolnshire
- Ambulance: East Midlands
- UK Parliament: Boston and Skegness

Keal Cotes, forming part of West Keal parish, is a small linear village in the East Lindsey district of Lincolnshire, England. It is situated on the A16 road, 1 mile (1.6 km) south of West Keal and 1 mile north of Stickford. The nearest market town is Spilsby, about 6 miles (10 km) to the north. Keal Cotes market day is on Mondays.

The village is at the southern edge of the Lincolnshire Wolds north of the Fenlands, and approximately 25 miles (40 km) east from the city and county town of Lincoln, 11 miles (18 km) north-east from the market town of Boston, and 12 miles (19 km) west from the holiday resort of Skegness.

The remains of a substantial Roman villa or high status Romano-British farmhouse, the only one found in Lincolnshire, are in a large field at the south end of the village.

The name of the village is occasionally spelt on some maps as "Keal Coates".

== History ==
=== Early history ===
The area has been occupied by man since pre-historic times. Evidence for this can be found at nearby West Keal where an Iron Age hill fort and defensive terraced earthworks stood at the tip of the Wolds promontory overlooking the present village. The early fortified stronghold had a commanding view of the Wash and almost as far as modern day Spalding across the flat marsh and boglands below.

The Keal Cotes area was visited and occupied by the Romans during the 1st century until the 4th century AD. An archeological dig and field walk in the village, during the 1960s, over a large field to the south of the village (in the corner where the A16 meets the Hagnaby Lane), discovered many tessellated mosaic floor tiles and roof tiles indicating that a substantial Roman villa or high status Romano-British farmhouse had once stood on the site. Several centuries of agricultural activity had plowed out any possibility of further excavations although the cropmark outlines of an extensive dwelling can be clearly seen on several aerial photographs.

With the fens drained by the Romans the area and the village settled down to 1,500 years of rural agriculture on land ideally suited to cereal crops.

=== Later development ===
Until the inclosure acts between 1750 and 1860 the village consisted of a scattered collection of small crofts and farmhouses. In the Victorian era several substantial houses and cottages were built in the village under the stewardship of the Weston-Craecroft-Amcotts family as Lords of the Manor.

The coaching inn originally known as The Ship Inn, with its spare teams of mail coach horses stabled in a coach house, was built in the late 18th century. The Inn was later renamed as The Vanguard in 1876 to commemorate the sinking of HMS Vanguard. In 1993 the public house's name was changed for the third time and is now called The Coach House although the actual coach house building was sold separately and converted as a family home. A Victorian style conservatory was added to the pub for use as a restaurant.

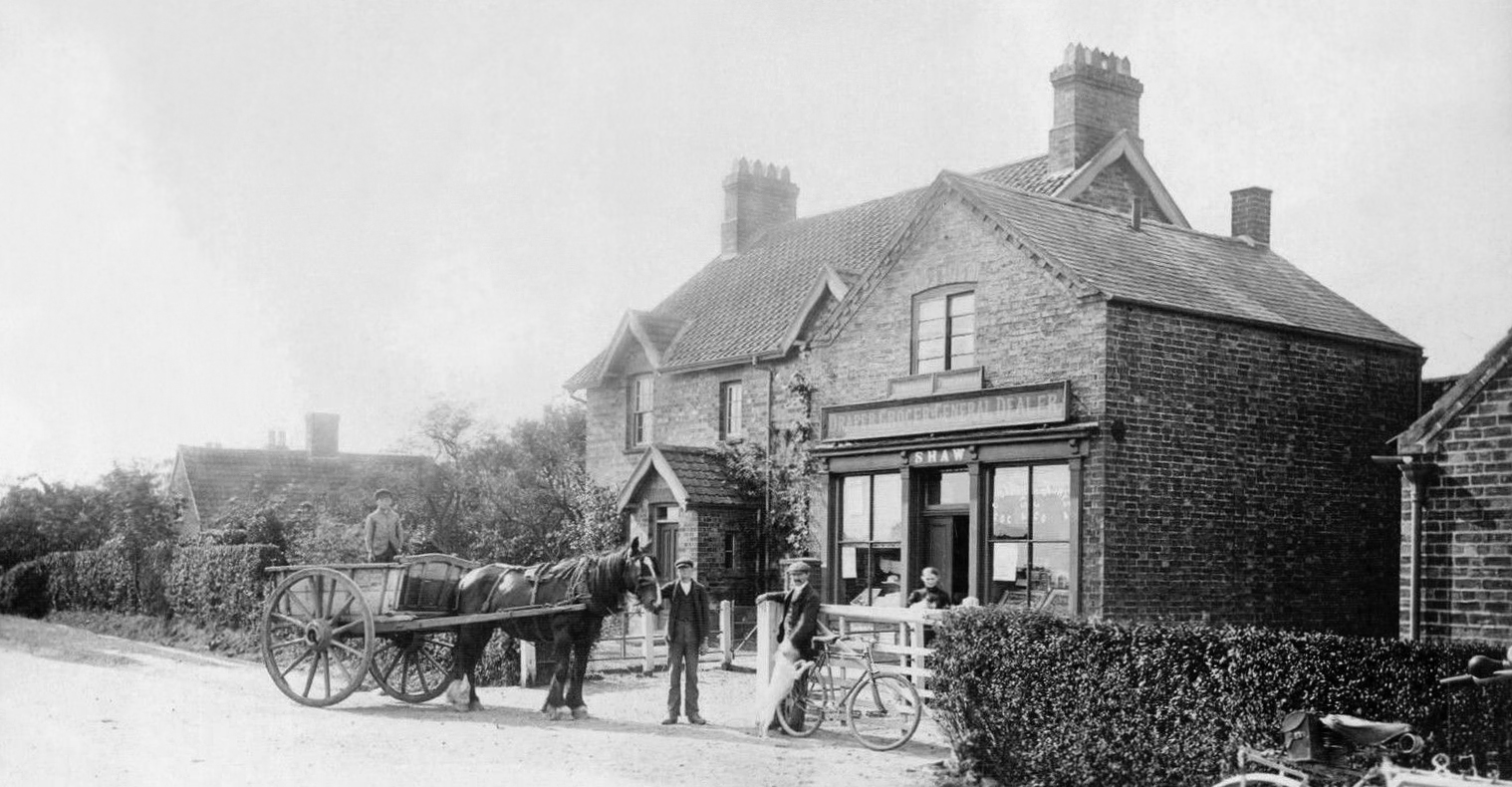
Shaw's general store and post office

Keal Cotes Post Office and village stores opened in 1795 on the same site as the village well and a 16th-century farmhouse, the oldest standing building in the village. The shop and post office was run by several generations of the local Shaw family for most of its existence. In 1923 the village telephone box was erected on a new layby outside the post office at a time when only the post office and the village blacksmith had a private telephone. The post office's telephone number was originally Spilsby 20 and later became Keal Cotes 200. The original shop and post office closed in 1995 after being downgraded to an unprofitable part-time community office, with the previous shop premises being absorbed by its adjoining house now known as 'Orchard View'. The principal factor causing the traditional levels of trade to drop was the building of the M18 motorway and the M180 motorway in the 1970s, diverting the previously busy A16 traffic. The post office franchise moved to a small house annex at the other end of the village for several years before moving yet again to the Coach House public house where it remained until it was eventually closed by Post Office Counters Ltd as a cost-saving exercise in 2005.

A Wesleyan Chapel and Sunday school was built in the village in 1891. Closed in the 1950s the building still stands and is now used as general storage facility by a local farmer. The village windmill, built in the 18th century, fell into decay and disuse before being demolished in 1949 and is only remembered by the naming of Mill Lane.

West Keal Primary School closed in the 1960s after the school roll fell below a sustainable level. After a fund raising campaign half of the school building was bought by the combined villages of Keal Cotes and West Keal and established as a community village hall, renamed as the "Craecroft Hall", with the other half of the building used as a private residence.

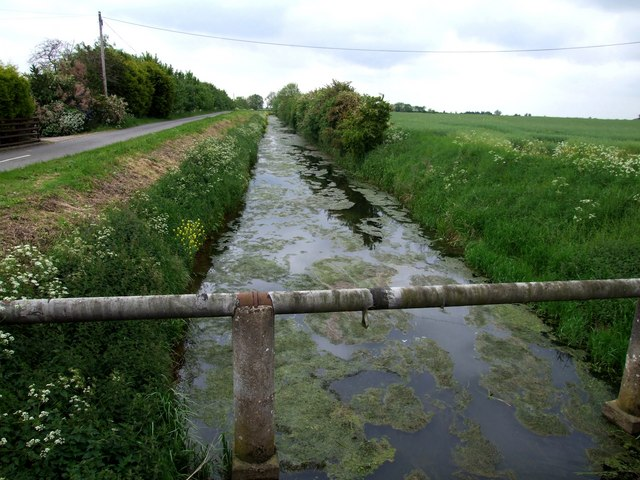
East Fen Catchwater Drain, from the Vanguard Bridge in Keal Cotes. Site of the Keal Cotes Wharf for the "Spilsby to Boston Steam Packet" former mail and passenger boat service

Between 1845 and 1930 the most commonly used route between Keal Cotes and Boston was by the daily Steam Packet passenger vessel that travelled between Spilsby and Boston several times a day, also carrying the mail. The Keal Cotes wharf on the East Fen Catchwater Drain was alongside the Vanguard Bridge, with further stops in Stickford and Sibsey the route joined up with the River Trader, past Boston Golf Course to a wharf near the windmill on the Maud Foster waterway through the centre of Boston. After a final stop near the Old Blue Anchor waterside public house on Windsor Bank the steam packet turned round and headed back to Spilsby.

There was a historic footpath through the fields connecting West Keal and Keal Cotes formalised by the Enclosure Act of 1750, much used by villagers heading for the West Keal Parish Church. The footpath was annexed for its entire length by the Air Ministry in 1941, as it passed across the perimeter track of RAF East Kirkby, with a firm undertaking that the footpath's right of way would be reinstated as and when the airfield ever closed. However, an administrative error by a junior Air Ministry clerk in 1965 resulted in the footpath being sold as several parcels of land by tender to a number of local farmers and subsequently ploughed up for agriculture. Several campaigns to reopen the original footpath for public leisure use over the last 40 years, but opposed by the influential landowners, have so far failed as no local residents were still alive to attest they had regularly walked the path before 1941. Law changes regarding countryside access encompassed by the Countryside and Rights of Way Act 2000 mean that unless the path can be included on the definitive map by 1 January 2026 it will cease to be a right of way in perpetuity.

Mains sewerage provision finally arrived in the village during 1994 although a mains gas supply has never been available, despite the high-pressure Boston to Spilsby gas main pipeline passing within 50 metres of the village centre. In 2005 a speed limit of 50 miles per hour was imposed on the A16 main road through the village after 40 years of campaigning by the villagers and the parish council.

=== Poor lands ===
The parish had several plots of land set aside as Poor Land, owning two adjoining cottages in the village, the Triangle Field opposite the chapel and several assorted fields. Annual revenues from these rented properties and the sale of hay cropped from the 15 metre wide verges each side of the West Keal footpath, totalling £3 11s 8d (£3.59) in 1865, were distributed annually on Lady Day (25 March) among any poor in the parish by the Parish Council. As a result of the 1834 Poor Law Amendment Act, the parish became part of the Spilsby Poor Law union which covered thirty-three local parishes.

In 1919 a village general meeting agreed to sell the two cottages into private ownership, as annual maintenance costs were making them uneconomic. During the Second World War several of the land plots, including the verges enclosing the West Keal to Keal Cotes footpath, were compulsorily annexed by the Air Ministry to form part of RAF East Kirkby which adjoined the village. Over the next twenty years all of the remaining plots, with the sole exception of the triangle field, were also sold. The combined sales produced a unified cash fund that is currently invested, with the annual interest income still distributed by the commissioners of West Keal Parish Charity Fund to deserving parishioners each Christmas.

Any Keal Cotes homeless poor were housed in the Spilsby Poor Law Union Workhouse at nearby Hundleby. The workhouse was recorded in 1870 as having 280 residents. Inmates were free to enter and leave as they liked and would receive free food and accommodation. However, the concern was that too liberal a regime would lead to many people who could easily work taking it easy in the workhouse. This would lead not only to an excessive charge on charitable funds but a dilution of the work ethic. To counter this the principle of less eligibility was developed. Workhouse life was deliberately made as harsh and degrading as possible so that only the truly destitute would apply. Attempts were also made to provide moral guidance, training and education to the poor but it would be fair to say that the principle of less eligibility combined with the ever-present desire to save money scuppered any real chance of success in this area. The workhouse was later converted into Spilsby's Gables Hospital that was demolished in 2004 to provide land for the building of new private housing.

== Governance ==
=== Westminster ===
Keal Cotes and West Keal fall within Boston and Skegness Constituency and the current MP is Mark Simmonds a Conservative.

=== Parish Council ===
Keal Cotes has no parish council of its own and is combined with West Keal as West Keal Parish Council. Keal Cotes provides three councillors to the Parish Council through elections every four years, or co-options if no candidates are nominated. The parish council meets monthly at the village hall.

== Geography ==
The village is situated on flat ground at the southwestern rim of the rolling Lincolnshire Wolds. Keal Cotes is at the northern edge of a tract of marsh and fen land, bounded by Boston deeps and the North Sea and is within seventeen miles inland from the holiday centre of Skegness, on the Lincolnshire coast.

The Wolds comprise a series of low hills and steep valleys underlain by calcareous chalk, green limestone and sandstone rock, laid down in the Cretaceous period under a shallow warm sea. The characteristic open valleys of the Wolds were created during the last ice age through the action of glaciation and meltwater.

Geographically, the Lincolnshire Wolds are a continuation of the Yorkshire Wolds which run up through the East Riding of Yorkshire, the Wolds as a whole having been bisected by the tremendous erosive power of the waters of the Humber. The Fenlands that stretch down as far as Norfolk are former wetlands consisted both of peat bogs and tidal silt marshes which were virtually all drained by the end of the 19th century when Keal Cotes had its longest period of Victorian expansion. The former peat fens and silt marshes provided a rich loamy soil that was ideal for the growing of cereal and vegetable crops and gave Lincolnshire its reputation as being the 'bread basket' of England. The resulting flatlands also made an ideal environment for the later mechanisation of farming in the mid 20th century. The soil in the village is a rich brown loamy earth over a heavy clay subsoil.

The drainage of the wetlands was organised into a combination of river and man-made drainage, aiding the passing of upland water through the region with internal drainage of the land between existing rivers. The internal drainage was designed to be organized by levels or districts each of which includes the fen parts of one or several parishes. The details of the organisation varies with the history of their development, but Keal Cotes falls within the Witham Fourth District: (East, West and Wildmore Fens and the Townland from Boston to Wainfleet). The manmade East Fen Catchwater Drain passes close to Keal Cotes ensuring that, although low lying, the possibility of flooding is almost non-existent. Minor problems have occurred in recent years through farmers and householders failing to properly complete the expected annual clearing of minor feeder drains around their properties. Additionally, many householders have chosen to pipe the drains through and around their gardens, greatly reducing their ability to handle higher levels of land drainage in heavy rain.

== Demography ==
There are no separately published demographic figures for Keal Cotes. The only figures available from the 2001 census combine Keal Cotes and West Keal, with West Keal being the slightly larger part.

Total Population: 333 of which 49.8% were male and 50.2% were female

Average age: 43

Married or remarried: 66.2%, Single and never married 16.2% with the remainder divided between divorced, separated and widowed.

With regard to ethnicity 99.1% of the combined population is white European and 0.9% Chinese.

Christians account for 75.1%, 0.9% are Buddhist and the remainder have no stated religion.

== Economy ==
The village economy is predominantly agricultural. There are few major employers in the area and the majority of employed residents commute to the commercial centres of Lincoln, Boston and Skegness. In recent years a number of commercial fishing lakes developed in the village, one of which has existed for nearly twenty years. The village has a public house and a shop. The local blacksmith's workshop closed in the 1990s. In 1994 the travelling Circus Harlequin relocated its winter quarters to Hagnaby Manor at the south end of the village, now renamed Kasanga Manor after the male African lion that died there in 1995. The manor is now home to a large collection of camels, reindeer and llamas.

== Landmarks ==
- The Coach House
- Keal Cotes Fishing Lake
- Keal Cotes Farm Shop
- Bolingbroke Castle - birthplace of King Henry IV on 3 April 1367
- Gunby Hall, a national trust stately home, open on selected days during summer months
- Battle of Britain Memorial Flight at nearby RAF Coningsby with its historic flying collection of an Avro Lancaster bomber plus five Supermarine Spitfires and two Hawker Hurricane fighters plus a DC47 Dakota transport and two Chipmunk trainers.
- Lincolnshire Aviation Heritage Centre is in East Kirkby, Spilsby on the site of RAF East Kirkby. The museum, which is open daily except Sundays, commemorates the RAF's presence in Lincolnshire during the Second World War, with notable airfields such as RAF Scampton being in the flat Lincolnshire countryside. The museum contains one of the world's three remaining Lancaster bombers still capable of flying (although it does not fly, as the privately run museum cannot afford the £2,000,000 cost of an air worthiness certificate).
- Spilsby Show takes place on the town playing fields on Ancaster Avenue off Boston Road. The event is held every July and proceeds support several local charities.
- Northcote Heavy Horse Centre
- Snipedales Nature Reserve and Country Park next to the historic Civil War battlefield at nearby Winceby

== Education ==
There are no schools in the village. Village children attend junior schools in Stickney, Toynton All Saints and Spilsby.

Secondary age children attend Grammar schools, Comprehensive Schools or Secondary modern schools that are in Spilsby, Boston, Skegness, Horncastle and Stickney. School bus transport is available from the layby outside The Coach House.

== Religious sites ==
The Anglican church in West Keal is dedicated to St Helen. The original church was consecrated in 1186, though little Norman work remains. The current church was built of Spilsby green sandstone and brick on a rise above the village in 1623 in the Early English and Perpendicular style, with buttresses and corners faced with Ancaster stone. The nave, with north and south aisles and clerestory, has five-bay arcades with double chamfered arches supported on hexagonal pillars. The tall tower, with battlements, pinnacles and grotesques, carries a peal of six bells.

Part of the church was rebuilt in 1866 due to the porous nature of the green sandstone that had deteriorated over two hundred years. The church tower fell down on 18 Sep 1881, but was quickly rebuilt and completed in 1884. The church clock stopped working in the 1980s and several early attempts to repair it proved to be failures. The clock was finally returned to working order just after 2001.

The former Wesleyan Chapel in the village is deconsecrated and closed.

== Notable people ==
- Martin Lacey – UK breeder of tigers who provided most of the Esso tigers for TV adverts from the 1950s to the 1990s lives in the village.
- Elizabeth Shaw - centenarian. She was born 22 April 1683, and was living at Keal Cotes in 1800. A life portrait of her by R. Sheardown was published in 1800.
