= East Ville railway station =

Former railway station in Lincolnshire, England

Coordinates: 53.0907°N 0.0979°E

East Ville
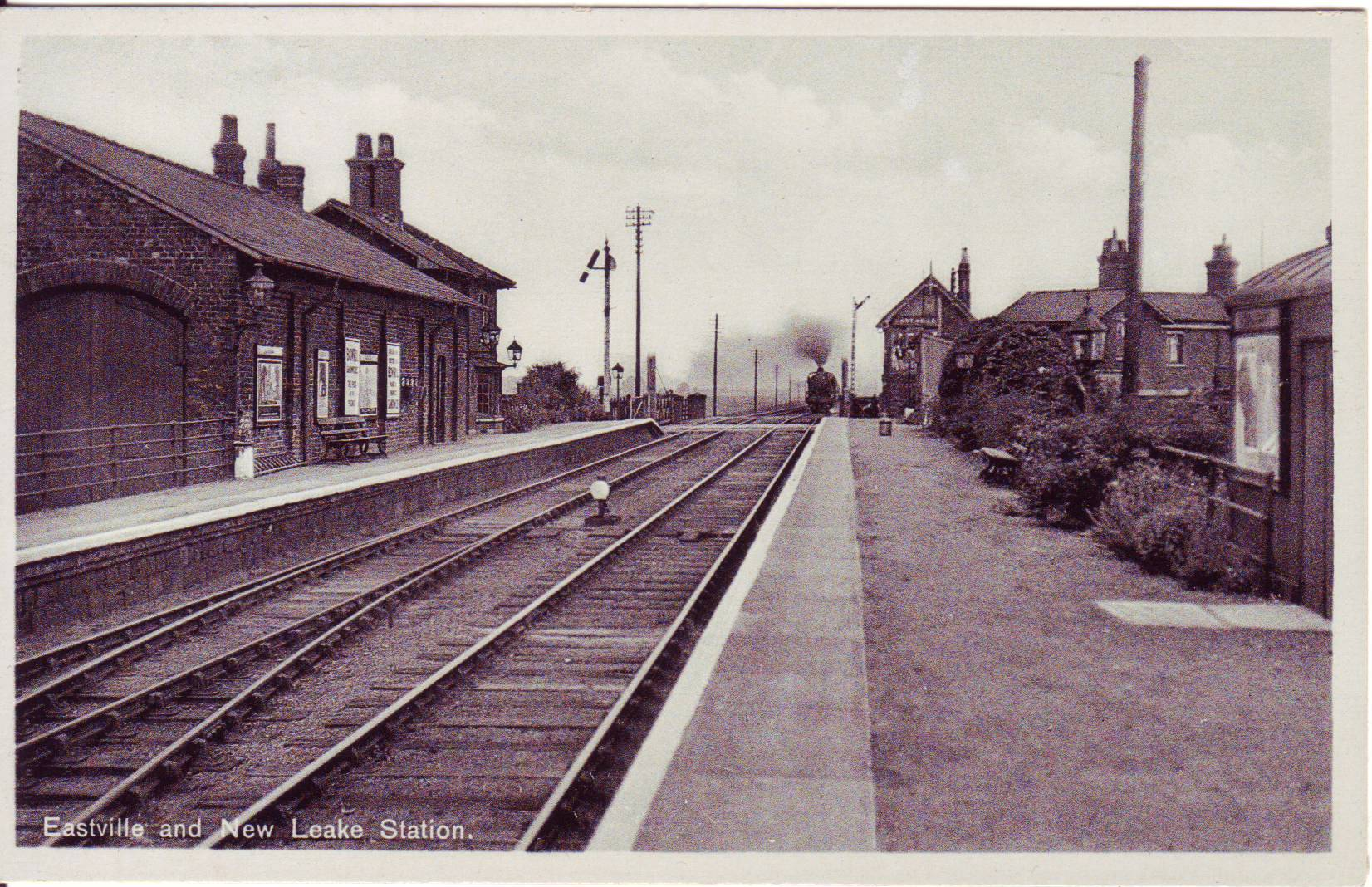

General information
- Location: Eastville, East Lindsey; England
- Platforms: 2

Other information
- Status: Disused

History
- Original company: East Lincolnshire Railway
- Pre-grouping: Great Northern Railway
- Post-grouping: London and North Eastern Railway; Eastern Region of British Railways

Key dates
- 2 October 1848: Opened as East Ville and New Leake
- October 1852: Renamed East Ville
- 11 September 1961: Closed to passenger traffic
- 15 June 1964: Closed to goods traffic
Location

East Ville was a railway station on the East Lincolnshire Railway which served the village of Eastville in Lincolnshire between 1848 and 1964. It originally opened as East Ville and New Leake, but was renamed in 1850. Withdrawal of passenger services took place in 1961, followed by goods facilities in 1964. The line through the station remains in use as the Poacher Line

== History ==
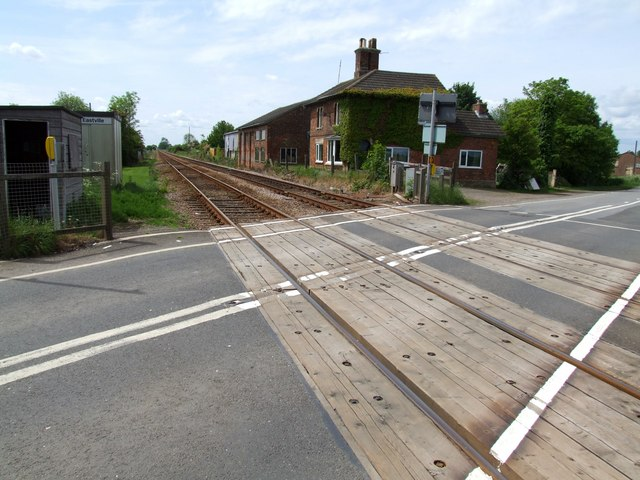
Station in 2007.

The station was opened on 2 October 1848 as East Ville and New Leake after the nearby settlements of Eastville and Leake, and later renamed in 1852 to simply East Ville. It was constructed by Peto and Betts civil engineering contractors who, in January 1848, had taken over the contract to construct the section of the East Lincolnshire Railway between Louth and Boston from John Waring and Sons. This section was the last to be completed in September 1848 at an agreed cost of £123,000 (equivalent to £15,600,000 in 2023). The station was situated in the middle of Eastville and was provided with two long sidings on the up side and a small goods yard, warehouse and long headshunt on the down side. To the north of parallel platforms was a signal box and level crossing, with the main station building located on the down platform. Goods traffic was always more important than passenger receipts and the goods yard handled large amounts of sugar beet in block loads, which were manually transferred to waiting wagons. The 1922 timetable saw five up and four down services, and one Sunday service each way. The station was closed to passengers on 11 September 1961 and to goods traffic on 15 June 1964.

Preceding station	Historical railways	Following station
Little Steeping; Line open, station closed	Great Northern Railway; East Lincolnshire Line	Old Leake; Line open, station closed

== Present day ==
The line through the station continues to be used by services on the Poacher Line between Grantham and Skegness.

== Sources ==
- Butt, R. V. J. (October 1995). The Directory of Railway Stations: details every public and private passenger station, halt, platform and stopping place, past and present (1st ed.). Sparkford: Patrick Stephens Ltd. ISBN 978-1-85260-508-7. OCLC 60251199. OL 11956311M.
- Conolly, W. Philip (2004) [1958]. British Railways Pre-Grouping Atlas and Gazetteer. Hersham, Surrey: Ian Allan Ltd. ISBN 978-0-7110-0320-0.
- Clinker, C.R. (October 1978). Clinker's Register of Closed Passenger Stations and Goods Depots in England, Scotland and Wales 1830-1977. Bristol: Avon-Anglia Publications & Services. ISBN 0-905466-19-5.
- Ludlam, A.J. (1991). The East Lincolnshire Railway (Locomotive Papers No. 82). Headington, Oxford: The Oakwood Press. ISBN 0-85361-416-4.
