= Henry Stubbe =

Henry Stubbe or Stubbes (1632–12 July, 1676) was an English royal physician, Latinist, historian, dissident, writer and scholar. He published An Essay in Defence of the Good Old Cause; or a discourse concerning the rise and extent of power of the civil magistrate in reference to spiritual affairs (1659) outlining ideas on religious toleration, which influenced John Locke.

== Life ==
He was born in Partney, Lincolnshire, and educated at Westminster School. Given patronage as a child by the Puritan, Henry Vane the Younger, he obtained a scholarship to Christ Church, Oxford, from which he graduated in 1653. This being the time of the English Civil War, he fought for Oliver Cromwell from then until 1655.

Described as a "most noted Latinist and Grecian of his age, a singular mathematician, and thoroughly read in all political matters, councils, ecclesiastical and profane histories." He was appointed second keeper to the Bodleian Library, but in 1659 his friendship with Henry Vane led to his being removed from this employment. His work A Light Shining Out Of Darkness did not help, being seen as an attack on the clergy.

He became a physician in Stratford-upon-Avon, and after the Restoration was confirmed in the Church of England. In 1661 was appointed His Majesty's Physician for Jamaica. The Jamaican climate disagreeing with him, he returned to England in 1665. He developed medical practices in both Bath and Warwick.

In 1673 he wrote against the Duke of York and Mary of Modena in the Paris Gazette. He was arrested and threatened with hanging. He drowned in an accident in Bristol and was buried in Bath.

== Writings ==
Stubbe was considered by Anthony Wood to be the most noted Latin and Greek scholar of his age, as well as a great mathematician and historian.

Following the Restoration he wrote polemical pieces against the Royal Society. They have been interpreted as showing a change in his political and religious views. Recent scholarship suggests, however, that the main theme in his life is continuity and his attacks on the Royal Society are a part of his veiled attack on the clerical and monarchical powers, of which the Royal Society was seen to be supportive. Connected with his assault on the Royal Society was criticism of Francis Bacon: Stubbe taxed the early Royal Society with being "Bacon-faced". Stubbe also supported Thomas Hobbes in his dispute with the mathematician and founding member of the Royal Society, John Wallis.

In 1671 he wrote An Account of the Rise and Progress of Mahometanism, and a Vindication of him and his Religion from the Calumnies of the Christians. He was unable to publish this book, considered the first work in English sympathetic to Islamic theology; it circulated privately. He tried to demonstrate the similarity between the beliefs of Islam and Unitarian Christianity. Stubbe can also be seen as part of a growing tradition at this time which expressed a dissatisfaction with intellectual inconsistencies of trinitarianism and sought to discover unitarian roots of the Christian tradition in the Middle East. Relative to Judaism, Stubbe in common with John Toland and Edward Stillingfleet followed the lead of John Selden and James Harrington, arguing for religious toleration. Hafiz Mehmood Khan Shirani eventually published An Account of the Rise and Progress of Mahometanism in 1911 under the auspices of the Islamic Society. Stubbe and other Socinians synthesized a form of Muhammadan Christianity.

His diverse interests and sense of genuine intellectual breadth are revealed in his authorship of a book celebrating chocolate, which he refers to as the Indian nectar, and in which he criticised those who refused it on puritanical grounds.

He has been the subject of three biographies: Peter Malcolm's "A Seventeenth-century Defender of Islam: Henry Stubbe", James R. Jacob's "HENRY STUBBE, radical Protestantism and the early Enlightenment", Nabil Matar's "Henry Stubbe and the Beginnings of Islam: The Originall & Progress of Mahometanism."

== Works ==
- Clamor, Rixa, Joci, Mendacia, Furta, Cachiny; or a Severe Enquiry into the Late Oneirocritica Published by John Wallis, Grammar-Reader in Oxon. (1657)
- Vindication of that Prudent and Honourable Knight Sir Henry Vane (1659)
- Essay in Defence of the Good Old Cause (1659)
- A Light Shining Out Of Darkness (1659)
- The Indian nectar, or, A discourse concerning chocolate (1662)
- The Plus Ultra Reduced to a Non Plus (1670)
- Legends No Histories (1670)
- Campanella Revived (1670)
- An Epistolary Discourse Concerning Phlebotomy and The Lord Bacons Relation of the Sweating-Sickness Examined (1671)
- A Justification of the Present War against the United Netherlands (1672)
- An Account of the Rise and Progress of Mahometanism, and a Vindication of him and his Religion from the Calumnies of the Christians (written sometime between 1668 and 1676) (apparently three of the six manuscript copies were held by John Disney, the early Unitarian minister)
