= Utterby Halt railway station =

Former railway station in Lincolnshire, England

Coordinates: 53.4355°N 0.0271°W

Utterby Halt
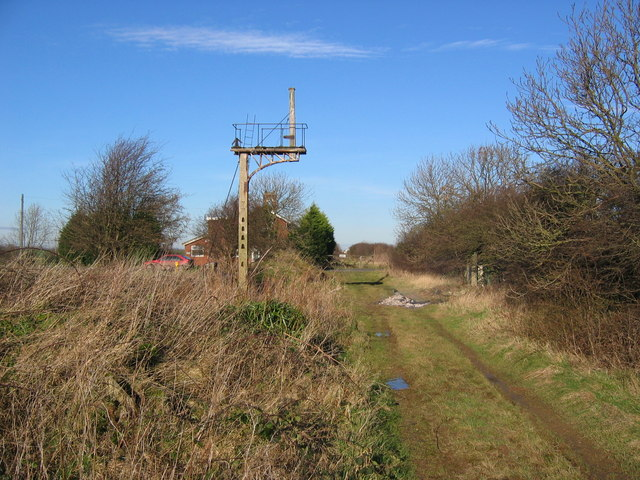
- Station site in 2007.

General information
- Location: Utterby, East Lindsey; England
- Platforms: 2

Other information
- Status: Disused

History
- Original company: Great Northern Railway
- Post-grouping: London and North Eastern Railway; Eastern Region of British Railways

Key dates
- 11 December 1905: Opened
- 11 September 1961: Closed
- December 1980: Closure of line
Location

Utterby Halt was a railway halt on the East Lincolnshire Railway which served the village of Utterby in Lincolnshire between 1905 and 1961. The station, which opened as part of a new motor train service between Grimsby Town and Louth, is reputed to be haunted by the ghost of a ganger killed on the level crossing in 1953. The line through Utterby remained open for freight until December 1980.

== History ==
The station was opened on 11 December 1905 to coincide with the introduction of a motor train service by the Great Northern Railway. It consisted of two low parallel halt platforms to the south of the level crossing over Pear Tree Lane; lamps were provided on both platforms, but only the down platform had a waiting shelter for passengers: a small wooden hut equipped with a heating stove. A crossing keeper's cottage lay to the north of the crossing on the down side which was of standard East Lincolnshire Railway design similar to that seen at Fotherby Halt, Grainsby Halt, Holton Village Halt and Weelsby Road Halt, all of which pre-dated the opening of the respective halts. Passenger services called at the station upon request only. The station closed on 11 September 1961, the same day as Fotherby Halt to the south which had also opened on the same day as part of the rail motor service.

The site of the halt is reputed to be haunted by the ghost of John Edward Lancaster, a local length ganger, who was fatally struck on the adjacent level crossing in dense fog by an oncoming Grimsby-Louth freight working in January 1953.

Preceding station	Heritage railways	Following station
Ludborough	Lincolnshire Wolds Railway (Future Extension)	Fotherby Halt
	Historical railways	
Ludborough; Line and station open	Great Northern Railway; East Lincolnshire Line	Fotherby Halt; Line and station closed

== Present day ==
The halt was demolished by British Rail long before final closure of the line in December 1980 and little remains of it today. The crossing keeper's cottage survives in good condition as a private residence. Ludborough's old down distant signal post stands over the trackbed to the south towards Louth.

On 28 September 1991, the Lincolnshire Wolds Railway obtained the Grimsby and Louth Light Railway Order 1991 (SI 1991/2210) authorising the reinstatement of the East Lincolnshire Railway between Waltham and the former Keddington Road level crossing near Louth, which would include the line through Utterby.

== Future ==
The Lincolnshire Wolds railway is currently extending towards Utterby Halt. The extension will be opened as soon as time and money permit. A run round loop operated by a two lever ground frame will eventually be installed here and will form the southern end of the railway for some time.

However it will be some time before the level crossing will be re-instated. It is also very unlikely that a Halt will be built here as in BR days it never justified its own existence. The crossing again like Grainsby halt will probably end up being automatically worked. The old signal post will eventually be removed and restored for future use elsewhere on the railway.

Eventually once the railway reaches Louth, a passing loop might be installed here to allow two train working. This would enable one train to pass another and allow greater scope for train running.

== Sources ==
- Butt, R. V. J. (October 1995). The Directory of Railway Stations: details every public and private passenger station, halt, platform and stopping place, past and present (1st ed.). Sparkford: Patrick Stephens Ltd. ISBN 978-1-85260-508-7. OCLC 60251199. OL 11956311M.
- Clinker, C.R. (October 1978). Clinker's Register of Closed Passenger Stations and Goods Depots in England, Scotland and Wales 1830-1977. Bristol: Avon-Anglia Publications & Services. ISBN 0-905466-19-5.
- King, P.K.; Hewins, D.R. (1998) [1989]. The Railways around Grimsby, Cleethorpes, Immingham & North-East Lincolnshire. Romiley, Stockport: Foxline Publishing. ISBN 978-1-870119-04-7.
- Ludlam, A.J. (1991). The East Lincolnshire Railway (OL82). Headington, Oxford: The Oakwood Press. ISBN 0-85361-416-4.
- Conolly, W. Philip (2004) [1958]. British Railways Pre-Grouping Atlas and Gazetteer. Hersham, Surrey: Ian Allan Ltd. ISBN 978-0-7110-0320-0.
- Stennett, Alan (2007). Lost Railways of Lincolnshire. Newbury, Berkshire: Countryside Books. ISBN 978-1-84674-040-4.
