= Hilldyke, Lincolnshire =

Hamlet in Lincolnshire, England

Coordinates: 53.008842°N 0.001283°W

Hilldyke
- Location within Lincolnshire
- OS grid reference: TF344475
  - London: 100 mi (160 km) S
- District: Boston, East Lindsey
- Shire county: Lincolnshire
- Region: East Midlands
- Country: England
- Sovereign state: United Kingdom
- Post town: BOSTON
- Postcode district: PE22
- Police: Lincolnshire
- Fire: Lincolnshire
- Ambulance: East Midlands
- UK Parliament: Boston and Skegness

Hilldyke is a hamlet, lying partly in East Lindsey, and partly in the Borough of Boston, in Lincolnshire, England. It is situated approximately 2 miles (3 km) north from the town of Boston, and on the A16 road.

Hilldyke is within an area of arable farmland, and contains a few small businesses. Population figures have reduced over the past 30 years, and now numbers about 12.

Hilldyke's public house, the Pied Bull, closed in the 1960s, although the site of the pub is still named as a local landmark for directions.

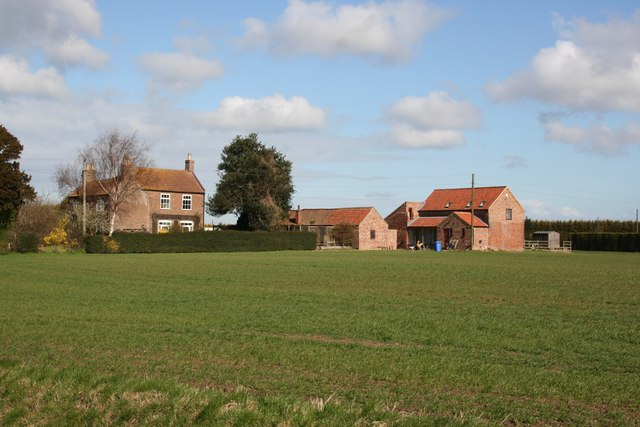
Hilldyke
