= Eastville, Lincolnshire =

Village in the East Lindsey district of Lincolnshire, England

Coordinates: 53.090725°N 0.093859°E

Eastville
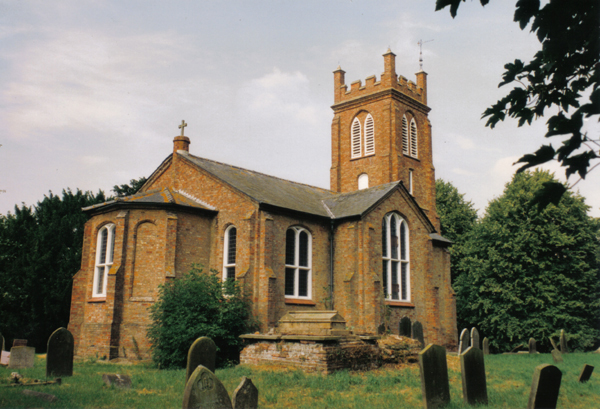
- Eastville parish church

- Location within Lincolnshire
- Population: 257 (2011)
- OS grid reference: TF403568
  - London: 110 mi (180 km) S
- District: East Lindsey
- Shire county: Lincolnshire
- Region: East Midlands
- Country: England
- Sovereign state: United Kingdom
- Post town: Boston
- Postcode district: PE22
- Police: Lincolnshire
- Fire: Lincolnshire
- Ambulance: East Midlands
- UK Parliament: Boston and Skegness

Eastville is a village in the East Lindsey district of Lincolnshire, England. It is situated approximately 9 miles (14 km) north-east from Boston and 6 miles (10 km) south from Spilsby.

== History ==
Eastville was an extra-parochial allotment of the East Fen, which was drained between 1802 and 1813. It was one of seven new settlements constituted as townships by an Act of Parliament passed in 1812 to deal with the drainage of the East, West and Wildmore Fens, and is not dependent on any parish. The other townships created at the same time from the drained fen lands include Midville, Frithville, and Langriville. Eastville was organised as a civil parish in 1866.

Following the Poor Law Amendment Act 1834, Eastville became part of the Spilsby Poor Law Union.

By the early 1870s the civil parish covered 1,260 acres, with a population of 246 persons in 44 houses. The land was described as fenny and the property divided among a few owners.

The Anglican parish church in Eastville was dedicated to Saint Paul and built at the same time as the parsonage, house and school. The Victorian Gothic church was consecrated in 1840 by John C. Carter, and was probably built shortly beforehand. It is a Grade II listed building and is notable for its unusual north–south orientation, which departs from the conventional east–west alignment of Anglican churches. The church has been closed since 2007 because of structural problems and ground shrinkage making it unstable; officials have applied to demolish it because there are no funds for restoration. In October 2013, the judge of the Consistory Court urged the diocese to study alternatives for saving the church, as he did not agree that it should be demolished.

The first Eastville school was condemned by an HM Inspector of Schools. A new school was built on the same site by the Eastville School Board (formed in 1895), and opened in 1897 as the Eastville Board School. By 1981, when it finally closed, it was known as the Eastville County Primary School. The last head teacher was Mrs M B Hands, who retired when the school closed. The last school secretary was Mrs Dawber.

=== Rail connections ===
East Ville was a railway station on the East Lincolnshire Railway which served the village of Eastville in Lincolnshire between 1848 and 1964. It originally opened as East Ville and New Leake, but was renamed in 1850. Withdrawal of passenger services took place in 1961, followed by goods facilities in 1964. The line through the station remains in use as the Poacher Line

== Economy ==
There is a composting plant here, producing bagged garden compost.
