= Fotherby =

Village and civil parish in the East Lindsey district of Lincolnshire, England

Coordinates: 53.407688°N 0.02202°W

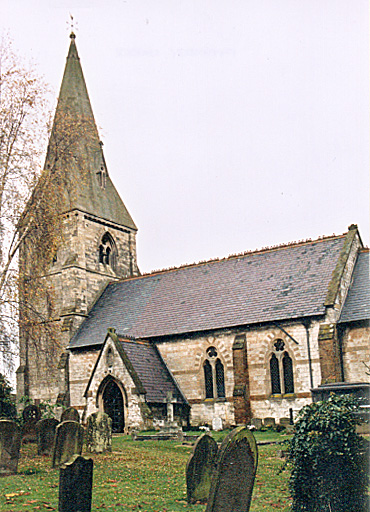
- St Mary's Church Fotherby

- Location within Lincolnshire
- OS grid reference: TF315919
  - London: 135 mi (217 km) S
- District: East Lindsey
- Shire county: Lincolnshire
- Region: East Midlands
- Country: England
- Sovereign state: United Kingdom
- Post town: Louth
- Postcode district: LN11
- Police: Lincolnshire
- Fire: Lincolnshire
- Ambulance: East Midlands
- UK Parliament: Louth and Horncastle

Fotherby is a village and civil parish in the East Lindsey district of Lincolnshire, England. It is situated just east from the A16 road, 13 miles (21 km) east from Market Rasen, and 10 miles (16 km) south from Cleethorpes.

In the Domesday account Fotherby is written as "Fodrebi". Before the Conquest lordship was held by Thorgot Lag, and after, Berengar of Tosny, with Robert of Tosny as Tenant-in-chief.

In 1885 Kelly's noted six almshouses, built in 1866 for the benefit of six poor people by James Fowler, on the site of an older glebe house. Parish area was 1,400 acres (5.7 km^{2}) with chief agricultural production of wheat, barley, oats, turnips, seeds and beans, and an 1881 population of 1881.

Fotherby Grade II listed Anglican church is dedicated to St Mary. It was entirely rebuilt by James Fowler in 1863, in Early English style with chancel, nave, south porch, and western tower with a broach spire containing three bells originally cast in 1608.

Further listed buildings are Mawers Farm on Peppin Lane, and a Sunday School building on Church Lane.
