= West Keal =

Village in Lincolnshire, England

Coordinates: 53.149215°N 0.042394996°E

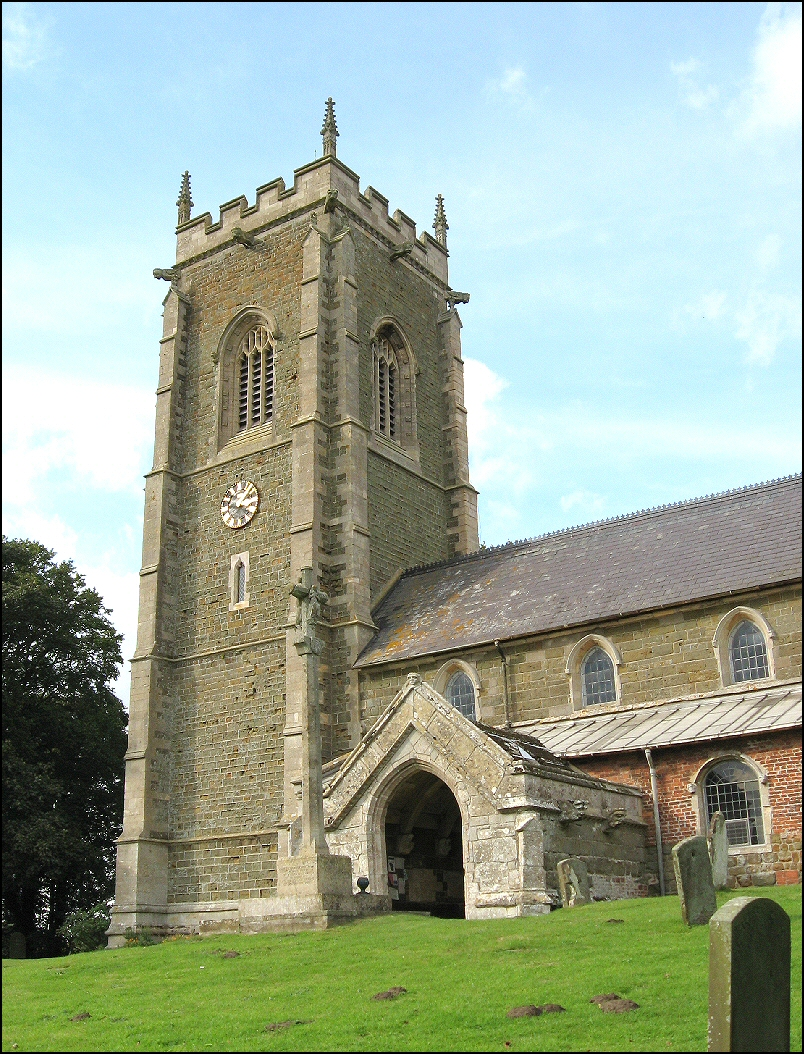
- St Helen's Church

- Location within Lincolnshire
- Area: 8.10 km^{2} (3.13 sq mi)
- Population: 327 (2011 census)
  - Density: 40/km^{2} (100/sq mi)
- Civil parish: West Keal
- District: East Lindsey
- Shire county: Lincolnshire
- Region: East Midlands
- Country: England
- Sovereign state: United Kingdom
- Police: Lincolnshire
- Fire: Lincolnshire
- Ambulance: East Midlands
- Website: http://parishes.lincolnshire.gov.uk/WestKeal/index.asp

West Keal is a village and civil parish 25 miles (40 km) east of Lincoln, in the East Lindsey district, in the county of Lincolnshire, England. The parish includes the hamlet of Keal Cotes. In 2011 the parish had a population of 327. The parish touches Bolingbroke, East Keal, East Kirkby, Mavis Enderby, Raithby and Stickford.

== Landmarks ==
There are 7 listed buildings in West Keal. West Keal has a church called St Helen's Church.

== History ==
The name "Keal" means 'Ridge(s)'. West Keal was recorded in the Domesday Book as Cale/Westrecale.
