= East Keal =

Village and civil parish in the East Lindsey district of Lincolnshire, England

Coordinates: 53.152160°N 0.057528°E

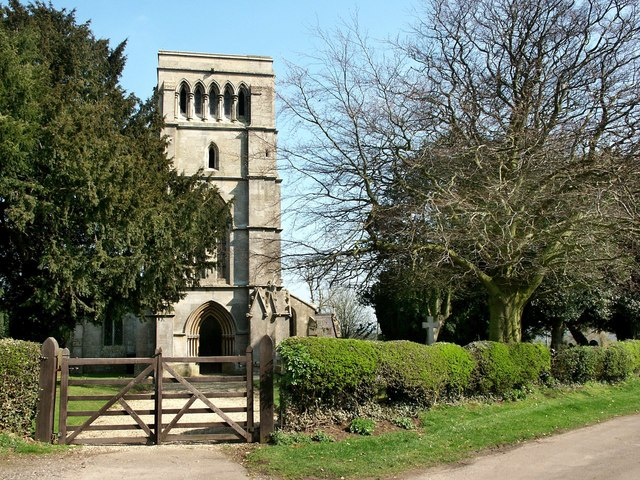
- Church of St Helen, East Keal

- Location within Lincolnshire
- Population: 366 (2011 census)
- OS grid reference: TF376636
  - London: 115 mi (185 km) S
- Civil parish: East Keal
- District: East Lindsey
- Shire county: Lincolnshire
- Region: East Midlands
- Country: England
- Sovereign state: United Kingdom
- Post town: Spilsby
- Postcode district: PE23
- Police: Lincolnshire
- Fire: Lincolnshire
- Ambulance: East Midlands
- UK Parliament: Louth and Horncastle

East Keal is a village and civil parish in the East Lindsey district of Lincolnshire, England. It is situated approximately 13 miles (21 km) north from the town of Boston, 2 miles (3 km) south from the town of Spilsby, and is located on the southern most edge of the Lincolnshire Wolds, an National Landscape and marks the point where the Wolds gives way to the flat Lincolnshire Fens.

East Keal church is dedicated to Saint Helen, dates from the 13th and 14th centuries, and is built in Early English and Perpendicular styles. It was extensively rebuilt in 1853–54 by Stephen Lewin but retains many of its original features. It is a Grade II* listed building. Edmund de Grimsby, later a prominent judge and Crown official, was parish priest here in the 1320s.

East Keal CE School was built as a parochial school in 1848. It reopened in 1874 as the East Keal National School, became a Junior School in 1950, and closed in 1968.

The small village of Keal Cotes lies on the border of East Keal and West Keal.

The East Keal brickworks site was partially excavated by the archaeologist and folklorist Ethel Rudkin.
