= Ludborough =

Village and civil parish in the East Lindsey district of Lincolnshire, England

Coordinates: 53.44062°N 0.05007°W

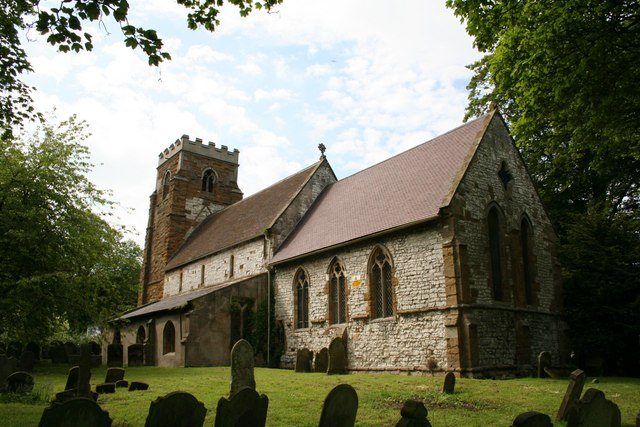
- St Mary’s Church, Ludborough

- Location within Lincolnshire
- Population: 191 (2011)
- OS grid reference: TF296955
  - London: 135 mi (217 km) S
- District: East Lindsey
- Shire county: Lincolnshire
- Region: East Midlands
- Country: England
- Sovereign state: United Kingdom
- Post town: GRIMSBY
- Postcode district: DN36
- Police: Lincolnshire
- Fire: Lincolnshire
- Ambulance: East Midlands

Ludborough is a village and civil parish in the East Lindsey district of Lincolnshire, England. It is situated approximately 5 miles (8 km) north from Louth, and at the eastern end of the A18 road. Ludborough has a population of 191 people. The Prime Meridian of the world passes to the east of the village.

== History ==
Evidence of Neolithic activity in the area was confirmed by a find, in the 1970s, of a stone axe believed to be of the Langdale type. Aerial photographs in 2010 led to the identification of a rectangular enclosure dating to the Iron Age or Roman period from cropmarks.

In A Dictionary of British Place Names, A.D. Mills interprets Ludborough's name to mean a 'fortified place' that may be associated in some way with the Lincolnshire town of Louth.

In the Domesday Book of 1086, Ludborough had 38 freeman and was considered 'very large'. Before the Norman Conquest of 1066, lordship was held by Thorgot Lag, and afterwards by Berengar of Tosny, with Robert of Tosny as tenant-in-chief and the head of the manor at Binbrook.

On 4 May 1297, King Henry III granted the manor holders, Richard de Breuse and his wife Alic, the right to hold a market in the village.

The parish church, dedicated to St Mary, retains elements from the 13th to the 15th century but was substantially renovated by James Fowler in 1858. Following the lengthy closure for renovation the church was re-opened on 1 May 1860.

In 1821, the parish had a population of 281, and had 45 homes. Around this time, part of the south aisle of St Mary's Church was used as a school.

== Geography ==
Work started on the bypass on 3 February 1992, by Shepherd Hill of Chesterfield, the same day as the A16 Stickford bypass. It cost £1.2m, and was 1.4 miles, and took 11 months to construct. The bypass opened on Sunday 25 October 1992, also the same day as Stickford.

== Community ==
Ludborough is noted for its railway station, the base for the heritage Lincolnshire Wolds Railway.
