= Alec Brader =

English footballer (1942–2024)

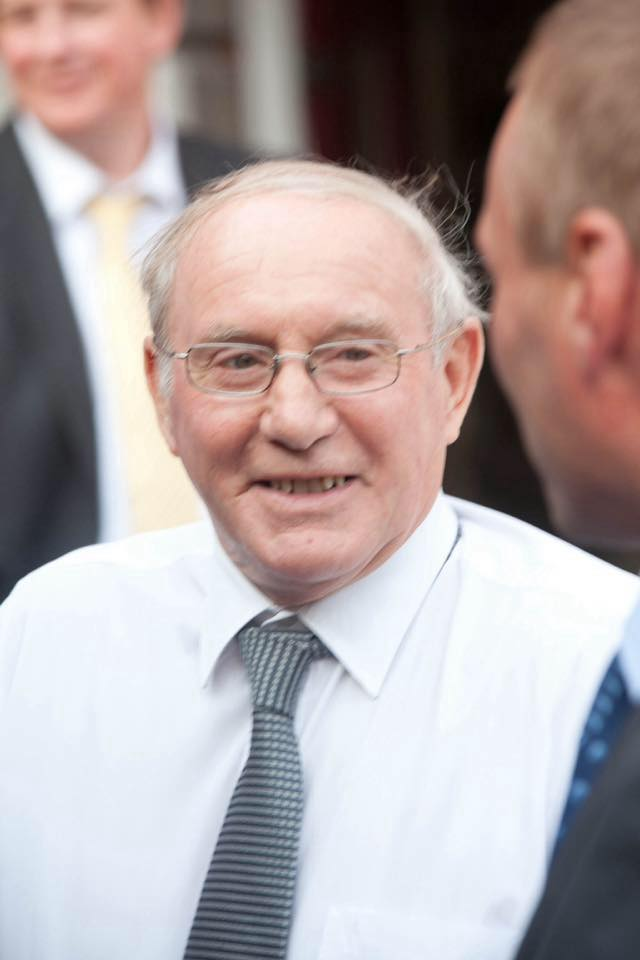
- Brader in 2017

Personal information
- Date of birth: 6 October 1942
- Place of birth: Horncastle, Lincolnshire, England
- Date of death: 27 October 2024 (aged 82)
- Place of death: Lincoln, Lincolnshire, England
- Position: Inside forward

Senior career*
Years	Team	Apps	(Gls)
1955–1956	Horncastle United		
1956–1963	Grimsby Town	2	(0)
1963–19??	Skegness Town		
- * Club domestic league appearances and goals

Alec Brader, MBE (6 October 1942 – 27 October 2024) was an English professional footballer, schoolteacher and youth athletics coach who played as an inside forward. Following his football career he became a schoolteacher teaching Physical Education, Geography, and European Studies, spending most of his career at William Lovell Academy where he eventually became Deputy Headmaster. He also volunteered as a youth athletics coach for Lincolnshire teams for over 40 years. For the Easter time he organized and went on tour with the Lincs Schools F.A. to the triborder area of the Netherlands, Germany, and Belgium. The youth football players took part in international tournaments and friendly matches.

For his services to "young people" he was made a Member of the Order of the British Empire in the 2009 New Years Honours list.

Brader died from kidney disease in Lincoln, on 27 October 2024, at the age of 82.

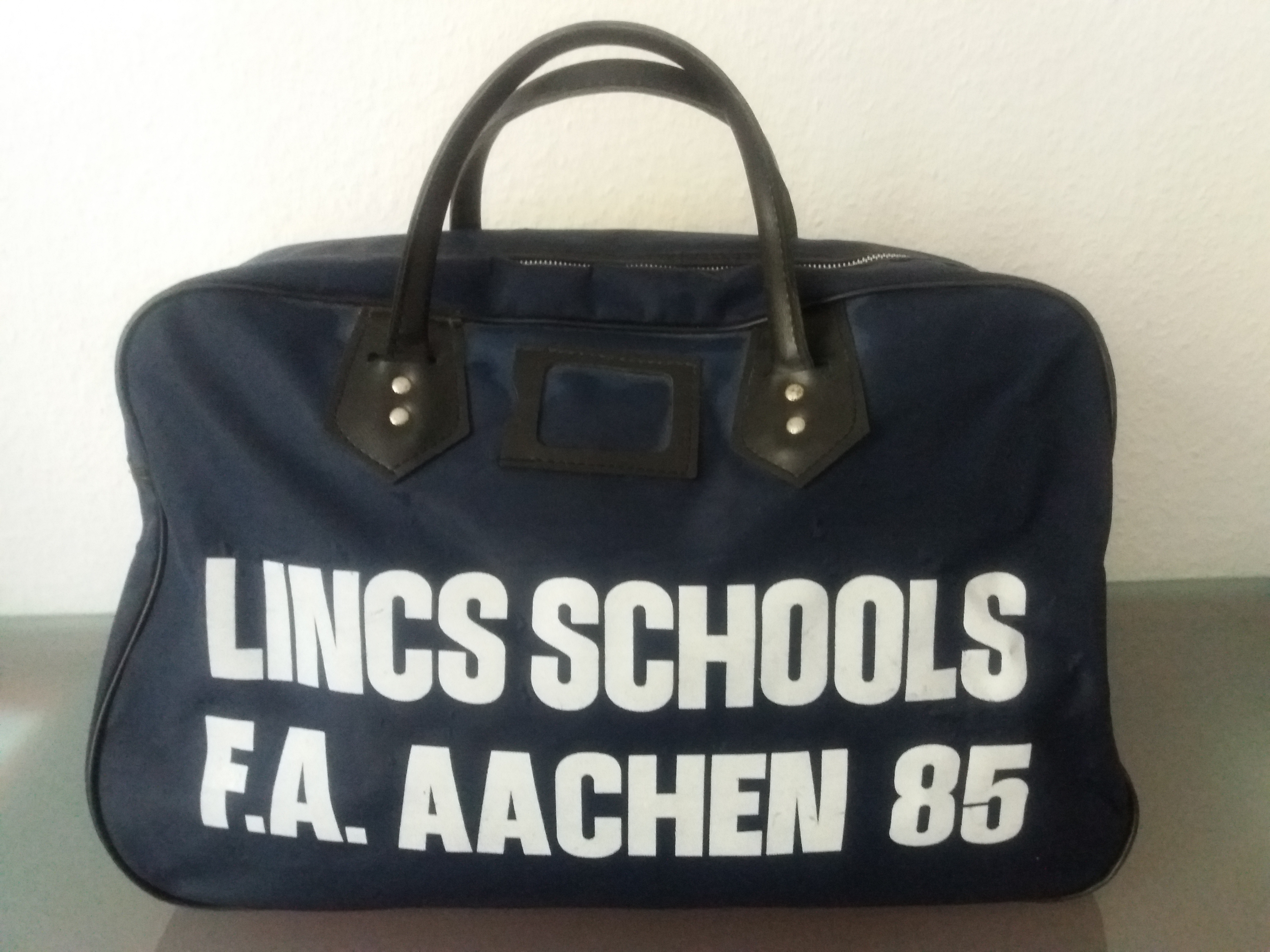
Sports bag Easter tour 1985 Aachen
