= Partney =

Village in Lincolnshire, England

Coordinates: 53.193987°N 0.109657°E

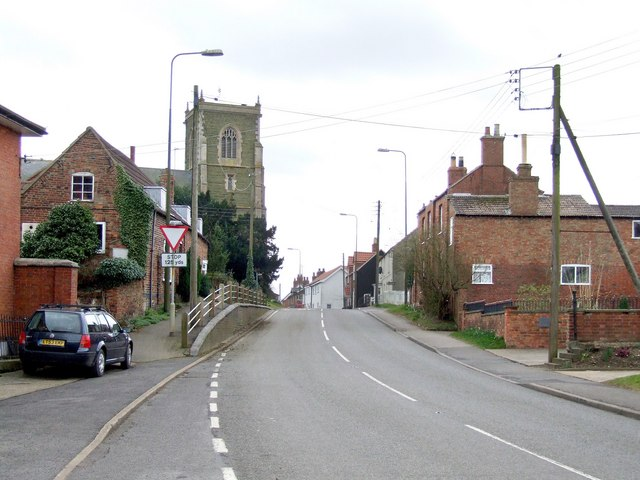
- Former A16, Partney village

- Location within Lincolnshire
- Population: 237 (2011)
- OS grid reference: TF410684
  - London: 115 mi (185 km) S
- District: East Lindsey
- Shire county: Lincolnshire
- Region: East Midlands
- Country: England
- Sovereign state: United Kingdom
- Post town: Spilsby
- Postcode district: PE23
- Police: Lincolnshire
- Fire: Lincolnshire
- Ambulance: East Midlands
- UK Parliament: Louth and Horncastle

Partney is a small village and civil parish in the East Lindsey district of Lincolnshire, England. It is situated 3 miles (4.8 km) north of Spilsby, and in the Lincolnshire Wolds. The village was the birthplace of Henry Stubbe, the noted 17th-century Intellectual.

Partney is at the intersection of the A16 and A158 roads. A village bypass diverts the road to Skegness, Ingoldmells, Chapel St. Leonards and Louth. Public transport is provided by the Stagecoach bus service number 56 which runs from Lincoln to Skegness.

== History ==
=== Partney Monastery ===
The existence of a Saxon Monastic house in Partney is known only from two references in Bede's Historia ecclesiastica gentis Anglorum (The Ecclesiastical History of the English People) of 731.

In Bowyer's History of the Mitred Parliamentary Abbies and other 18th- and 19th-century authors Bede's placename Peartenau is identified with Bardney. But Bede mentions Peartenau and Beardeneu in adjacent paragraphs, and the link to Bardney is now discredited. Pearteneau is likely to be Partney. The monastery is thought to have been destroyed by Viking raids around 870. No archaeological trace is known, but some burials confirm Saxon occupation at that time.

==== Abbots of Peartenau ====
- Deda, occurs 730
- Aldwin (mentioned by Bede without date)

=== Dig at Partney ===
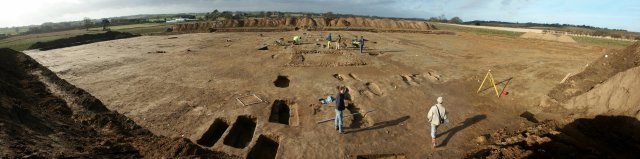

Work on the town's bypass was preceded by a major archaeological investigation, which concentrated on a Romano-British settlement and the 10th century monastic hospital. Apparently unrelated to the lost Saxon monastery, the later Benedictine medieval abbey of Bardney established a hospital at Partney, run as a cell of the abbey. The hospital was dedicated to St Mary Magdalene. The chapel survived only as wall foundations as the above-ground remains have been entirely robbed out. The foundations suggest a modest rectangular stone building measuring 13.8 yards long by 7.2 yards wide with external buttresses.

=== Domesday ===
Partney appears twice in the Domesday Book, as part of the Manor of Bardney. It is rendered as "Partenai" or "Partene",

== Community ==
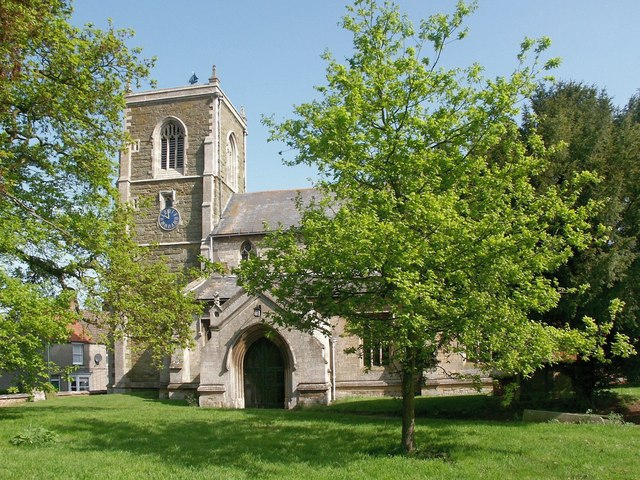
Church of St Nicholas

Partney church is dedicated to St Nicholas. It is built of greenstone in Perpendicular style and dates from the 14th century. The brick chancel was built in 1828. The porch was constructed, and the nave and aisles rebuilt, by C. E. Giles, c. 1862. The tower was partly rebuilt in 1910. In the churchyard stands a stone commemorating the marriage of Matthew Flinders within the church. The ecclesiastical parish of Partney is part of the Partney Group of the Deanery of Bolingbroke.

Victory Hall, next to the church, is an amenity for local clubs and groups.

The small village primary school is Church of England aided.

In the past Partney held a sheep fair. Today an annual summer fair is held to raise money for local causes.

== Notable people ==
Henry Stubbe and the actor Stephen Murray were born in the village.
