= Stickford =

Village and civil parish in the East Lindsey district of Lincolnshire, England

Coordinates: 53.121905°N 0.026400°E

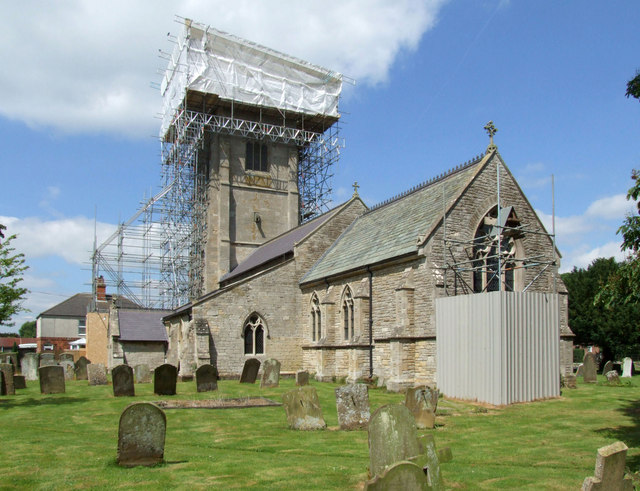
- Church of St Helen, Stickford

- Location within Lincolnshire
- Population: 497 (2011 Census)
- OS grid reference: TF357602
  - London: 110 mi (180 km) S
- District: East Lindsey
- Shire county: Lincolnshire
- Region: East Midlands
- Country: England
- Sovereign state: United Kingdom
- Post town: Boston
- Postcode district: PE22
- Dialling code: 01205
- Police: Lincolnshire
- Fire: Lincolnshire
- Ambulance: East Midlands
- UK Parliament: Boston and Skegness

Stickford is a village and civil parish in the East Lindsey district of Lincolnshire, England. The village is situated near the A16 road and approximately 6 miles (10 km) south-west from the town of Spilsby. In 2011 the parish had a population of 497.

== History ==
Stickford is first recorded in the Domesday Book of 1086, where it appears as Stichesforde, meaning 'stick ford' (cf. the nearby Stickney).

Stickford church is dedicated to Saint Helen and is a Grade II* listed building. It dates from the 13th century although it has been much restored.

Stickford County Primary School finally closed in 1987. It had opened as a National School in 1846, and was a Board School between 1872 and 1903 when those were abolished.

Shaws Windmill is a three-storey red-brick tower mill dating from 1820, which ceased working in 1952, and is now Grade II listed.

== Geography ==
The A16 bypass was started on 3 February 1992, the same day as the A16 Ludborough bypass, which was also built by Shepherd Hill of Chesterfield. It cost £1.35m and is 1.1 miles long. It was opened on Sunday 25 October 1992.
