= Carrington and New Bolingbroke =

Civil parish in Lincolnshire, England

Coordinates: 53.080°N 0.045°W

- Civil parish
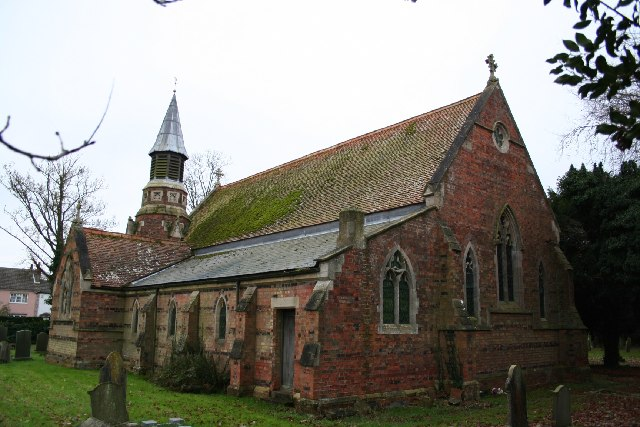
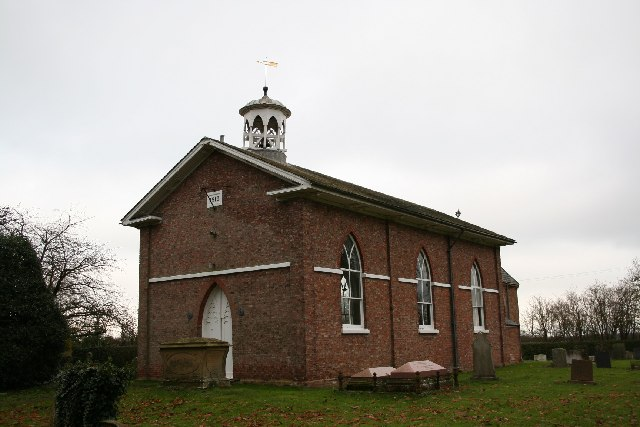
- St Peter's Church, New Bolingbroke St Paul's Church, Carrington

- Location within Lincolnshire
- Interactive map of Carrington and New Bolingbroke
- Area: 6.37 sq mi (16.5 km^{2})
- Population: 516 (2021)
  - Density: 81/sq mi (31/km^{2})
- OS grid reference: TF310554
- District: East Lindsey
- Shire county: Lincolnshire
- Region: East Midlands
- Country: England
- Sovereign state: United Kingdom
- Settlements: Carrington; New Bolingbroke; Medlam; Short's Corner
- Post town: BOSTON
- Postcode district: PE22
- Dialling code: 01205
- Police: Lincolnshire
- Fire: Lincolnshire
- Ambulance: East Midlands
- UK Parliament: Boston and Skegness
- Website: carrington-new-bolingbroke.parish.lincolnshire.gov.uk

Carrington and New Bolingbroke is a civil parish in the East Lindsey district of Lincolnshire, England. It lies in the Lincolnshire Fens approximately 7 miles (11 km) north of Boston and east of Coningsby. The parish comprises the villages of Carrington and New Bolingbroke together with the hamlets of Medlam and Short's Corner. At the 2021 census it had a population of 516.

== Geography ==
The parish occupies low-lying drained fenland typical of the West Fen, with elevations generally only a few metres above sea level. It is characterised by arable farmland, straight drainage channels and scattered farmsteads. The principal settlements are Carrington (to the south) and New Bolingbroke (about 1.5 miles (2.4 km) to the north). Medlam is a hamlet north of Carrington, Short's Corner is by a crossroads to the south of the parish. The Medlam Drain runs along part of the parish boundary, and the Twenty Foot Drain is a significant local watercourse within the drainage network.

== History ==
Archaeological evidence within the parish is limited owing to the late reclamation of the fen. Recorded finds include a small Neolithic polished stone axe (exact findspot uncertain, reported as Carrington or Boston area) and a late Anglo-Saxon or Viking hexagonal gold ring found near Carrington during the Second World War.

The area was largely uninhabited marsh until the early 19th century. Drainage of the West Fen began in 1802 under schemes associated with Sir Joseph Banks and engineer John Rennie. In 1812 a township named Carrington was created from drained land and named after Robert Smith, 1st Baron Carrington, the principal landowner. It became a civil parish in 1858.

New Bolingbroke was founded in the 1820s by John Parkinson (steward to Sir Joseph Banks) as a planned industrial settlement intended to grow into a market town; it featured a weaving factory, workers’ housing and a “Town Hall”. Watkinson's Mill (also known as the windmill next to Watkinson's Bridge), a tower mill built in 1821, survives as a truncated stump.

A WWII-era pillbox was built at Short's Corner. A German Luftwaffe Dornier Do 17 bomber crashed south-east of Carrington on 8 May 1941 after being shot down by a Beaufighter of 25 Squadron; the three crew bailed out, though one was killed.

New Bolingbroke formerly had a railway station on the Kirkstead and Little Steeping Railway (the “New Line”), which opened in 1913, closed temporarily in 1915, reopened in 1923 and closed permanently to passengers in 1970. The station buildings survive and are now used as an antiques and architectural salvage yard.

The modern civil parish was formed by the merger of Carrington and New Bolingbroke. In November 2022 the parish was formally renamed “Carrington and New Bolingbroke” and the council adopted town-council status.

== Governance ==
The parish is administered by Carrington and New Bolingbroke Town Council. It forms part of the Sibsey & Stickney electoral ward and the Boston and Skegness parliamentary constituency. Historically it lay within the ancient Bolingbroke Soke in the Parts of Lindsey.

== Demographics ==
The 2021 census recorded a population of 516. Earlier figures were 612 (2001) and 554 (2011). The population is predominantly White British and rural in character.

== Economy ==
The local economy is dominated by arable agriculture on the drained fenland. Limited local enterprises include farm-based businesses and small-scale services serving the villages. Residents travel to Boston, Coningsby or Stickney for most shopping and employment. The historic industrial ambitions of New Bolingbroke (weaving and market functions) did not fully materialise.

== Landmarks ==
The parish contains 13 Grade II listed buildings, reflecting its early-19th-century planned character:

- Church of St Paul, Carrington – red-brick church built in 1816 under the Fen Chapel Act; chancel added 1872.
- Church of St Peter, New Bolingbroke – designed by S. S. Teulon and built in 1854; red brick with blue-brick and ashlar dressings.
- New Bolingbroke Town Hall (Village Hall) – early-1820s building erected by John Parkinson as part of his planned market town; still used for community and council meetings.
- The Crescent, New Bolingbroke – curved terrace of red-brick houses and former shops built in 1823 to house weaving-factory workers.
- Other listed structures include two mid-19th-century windmills (one known as Rundle’s Mill / Watkinson's Mill), Teulon House, Carrington House, Sykes Farm Cottage, a bridge over the Twenty Foot Drain, and the war memorial at Carrington.

Carrington War Memorial (also Grade II listed) stands opposite the Church of St Paul and overlooks Carrington Park. Unveiled in April 1920, the 15-foot (4.5 m) Portland stone Latin cross on a stepped base commemorates those who served and died in both World Wars; it was restored in 2011.

== Transport ==
The parish is served by minor roads linking to the A16 and B1183. There is no railway station currently in use; the nearest stations are at Boston. Limited bus services connect the villages to Boston and surrounding settlements.

== Community ==
=== Amenities ===
Community facilities centre on the two parish churches, the Town Hall / village hall in New Bolingbroke, and Carrington Park (a historic parkland area associated with Carrington House and still extant). Primary education was historically provided at Carrington (formerly Medlam School); children now attend schools in nearby Stickney. Residents use amenities in neighbouring towns and villages for secondary education, shopping and healthcare.

=== Events ===
The Carrington Rally (Carrington Rally – Steam & Heritage Show) is an annual steam, tractor and heritage event held over the late May bank holiday weekend. Originating in 1961 and run by volunteers, it features steam engines, working displays, craft and trade stalls, and attracts thousands of visitors.
