= Spilsby railway station =

Former railway station in Lincolnshire, England

Spilsby
- Spilsby railway station c.1890.

General information
- Location: Spilsby, East Lindsey, Lincolnshire; England
- Coordinates: 53.16969°N 0.09690°E
- Grid reference: TF401657
- Platforms: 1

Other information
- Status: Disused

History
- Original company: Spilsby and Firsby Railway
- Pre-grouping: Great Northern Railway
- Post-grouping: London and North Eastern Railway; Eastern Region of British Railways

Key dates
- 1 May 1868: Opened
- 10 Sep 1939: Closed to passengers
- 1958: Closed to goods
Location

Spilsby railway station was a railway station in the market town of Spilsby, Lincolnshire, England. The station stood on a four mile long branch line between Spilsby and Firsby Junction, where it connected with the main line from Cleethorpes to London, and was opened on 1 May 1868. However, traffic on the line soon slumped, and the line was bought by the Great Northern Railway in 1890. In 1939 passenger services on the line were suspended, leaving only a goods service which itself ceased in 1958, when the railway station and line were closed.

Former Services

Preceding station	Disused railways	Following station
Terminus	Great Northern Railway; Spilsby branch	Halton Holegate

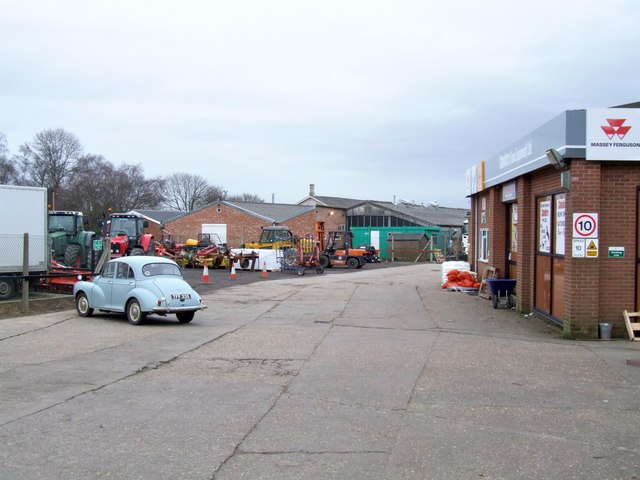
Modern view of the site of the station
