= Stickney railway station =

Former railway station in Lincolnshire, England

Coordinates: 53.09878°N 0.00454°E

Stickney
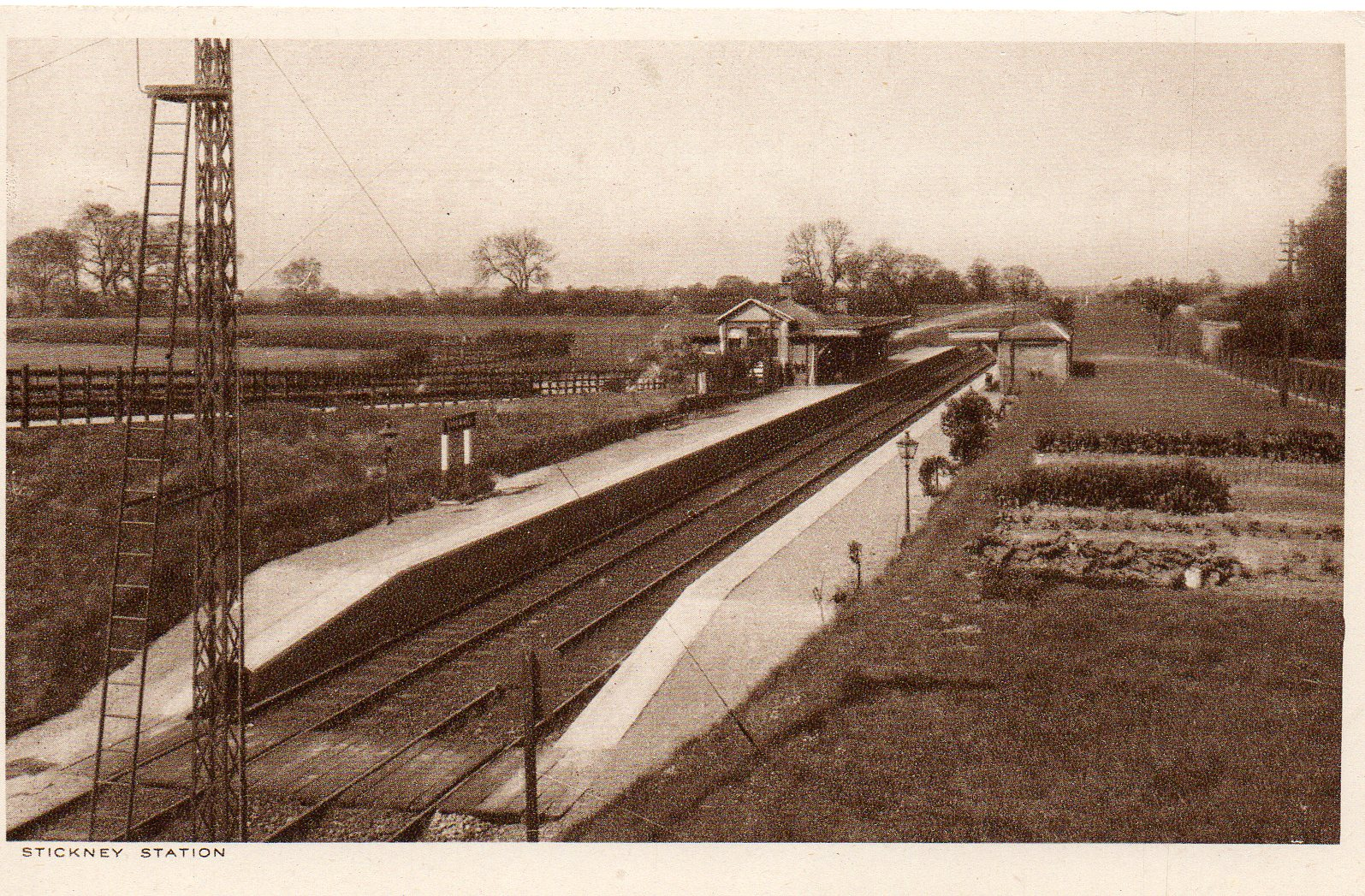
- Stickney station in the 1900s

General information
- Location: Stickney, East Lindsey, Lincolnshire; England
- Platforms: 2

Other information
- Status: Disused

History
- Pre-grouping: GNR
- Post-grouping: LNER; Eastern Region of British Railways

Key dates
- 1913: Opened
- 1915: Closed
- 1923: Opened
- 1970: Closed
Location

Stickney railway station is a former station that served the village of Stickney, in Lincolnshire, England. The station was on the Kirkstead and Little Steeping Railway which ran between Lincoln and Firsby. The line was sometimes called the "New Line". It was opened in 1913 and closed in 1970. The site has since been redeveloped with nothing left of the station.

Preceding station	Disused railways	Following station
New Bolingbroke; Line and station closed	Great Northern Railway; Kirkstead and Little Steeping Railway	Midville; Line and station closed
