= Coningsby railway station =

Former railway station in Lincolnshire, England

Coordinates: 53.10853°N 0.16329°W

Coningsby
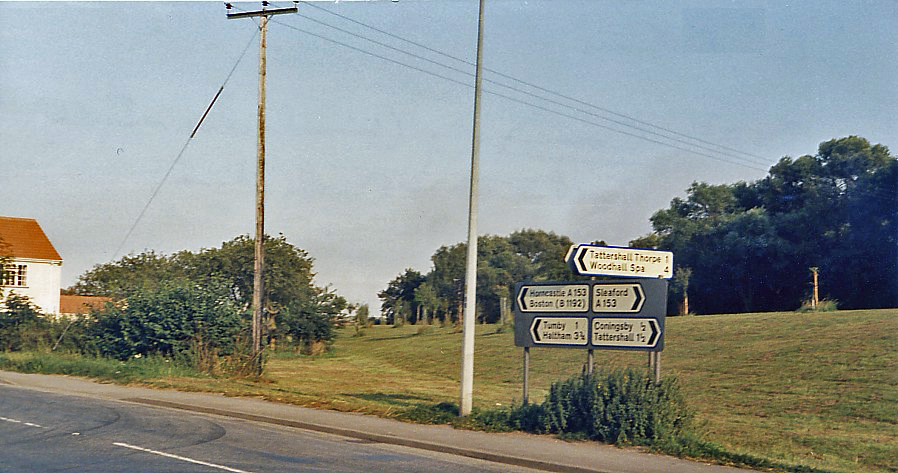
- Site of Coningsby station in 1983

General information
- Location: Coningsby, East Lindsey, Lincolnshire; England
- Platforms: 2

Other information
- Status: Disused

History
- Pre-grouping: GNR
- Post-grouping: LNER; Eastern Region of British Railways

Key dates
- 1913: Opened
- 1915: Closed
- 1923: Opened
- 1970: Closed
Location

Coningsby railway station was a station in Coningsby, Lincolnshire, England on the Kirkstead and Little Steeping Railway which ran between Lincoln and Firsby. The site has been landscaped with no trace of the station left. The station masters house survives as a private residence.

Preceding station	Disused railways	Following station
Woodhall Junction; Line and station closed	Great Northern Railway; Kirkstead and Little Steeping Railway	Tumby Woodside; Line and station closed
