= Tumby =

Tumby may refer to the following places:

== In Australia ==
- Tumby Bay, South Australia (previously known as Tumby), a town
- Tumby Island, an island in Tumby Bay in South Australia

== In England ==
- Tumby, Lincolnshire
- Tumby Moorside, Lincolnshire
- Tumby Woodside, Lincolnshire
