= New Bolingbroke Town Hall =

Municipal building in New Bolingbroke, Lincolnshire, England

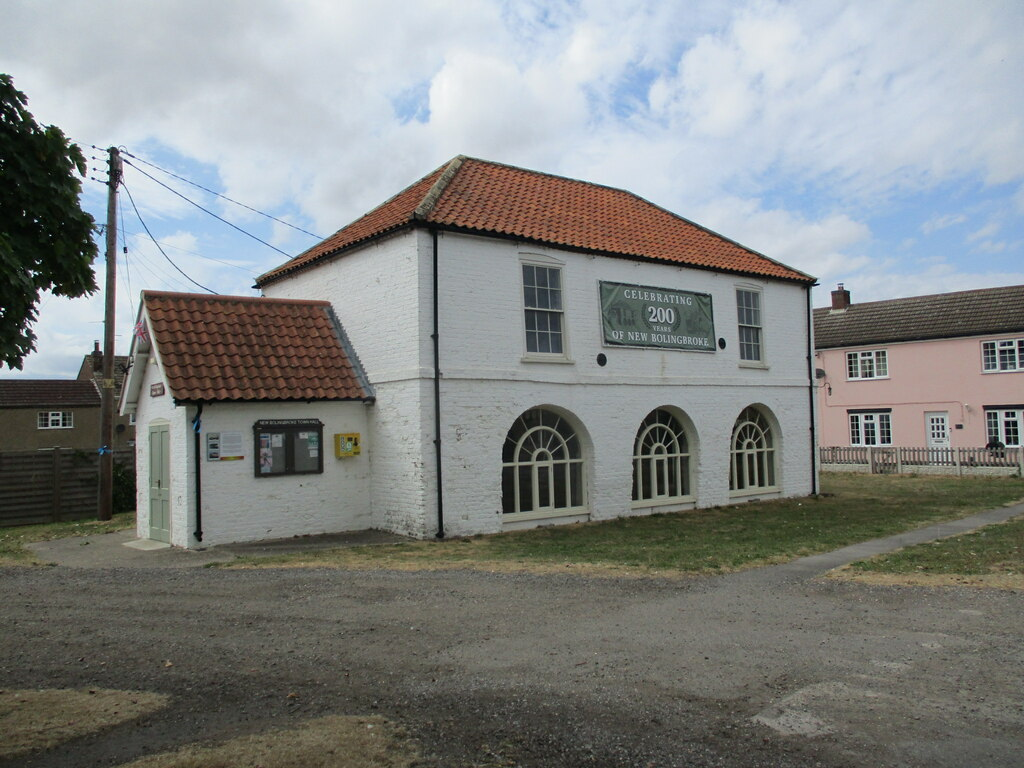
- The building in 2022

- Shown in Lincolnshire
- 53.1034°N 0.0477°W
- Location: Seven Mile Straight, New Bolingbroke

History
- Built: 1823

Site notes
- Architectural style: Neoclassical style

Listed Building – Grade II
- Official name: Village hall
- Designated: 2 June 1987
- Reference no.: 1063565

New Bolingbroke Town Hall is a historic building on Seven Mile Straight in New Bolingbroke, part of the town of Carrington and New Bolingbroke in Lincolnshire, in England. The structure, which currently operates as a meeting place for Carrington and New Bolingbroke Town Council, is a Grade II listed building.

== History ==
The building was commissioned as a butter market by the founder of New Bolingbroke, John Parkinson, who was the proprietor of a local factory manufacturing crepes and bombazines. Parkinson had three ambitions: (i) To sink a coal mine (ii) To plant a forest and (iii) To found a city. His intention was that New Bolingbroke would grow into a sizable town, and ideally a major city, and so he named the building the "Town Hall". The site he selected, on the west side of Seven Mile Straight, was owned by the principal landowner in the area, the Duchy of Lancaster.

The building was designed in the neoclassical style, built in brick and was completed in or soon after 1823. It was arcaded on the ground floor, so that markets could be held, with an assembly room on the first floor. The assembly room was initially used by the local school. Parkinson arranged for the weekly markets to be transferred from Old Bolingbroke to New Bolingbroke to assist the development of the area. The settlement remained a small village, but the name "Town Hall" was retained.

The building was also used for church services until St Peter's Church was completed in 1854. In 1918, the Duchy of Lancaster sold the building together with much of the rest of the village. The arches on the ground floor were bricked up, and a porch was added to the south end of the building.

New Bolingbroke Parish was absorbed into Carrington Parish in around 1990. An extensive programme of exterior refurbishment works, which involved white-washing the outside of the building, unbricking the arches and inserting round headed windows, was completed in 2016, and a further programme of internal refurbishment works, which involved the redecoration of the rooms, was completed with financial support from the National Lottery Community Fund in 2019.

Carrington Parish Council was renamed Carrington and New Bolingbroke Town Council in March 2023. The building remains one of the meeting places of the newly named town council.

== Architecture ==
The two-storey building is constructed of colour washed red brick, and has a hipped pantile roof. It is three bays long, and the ground floor has three openings, which have been infilled with windows. There are two sash windows on first floor. The building was grade II listed in 1987.
