= Halton Holegate railway station =

Former railway station in Lincolnshire, England

Coordinates: 53.1586°N 0.1172°E

Halton Holegate
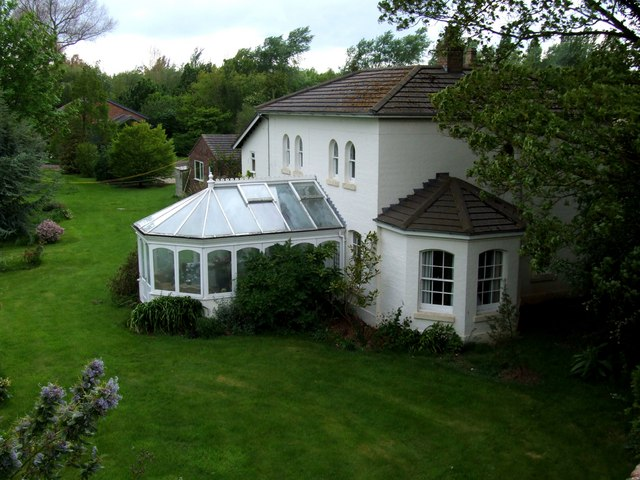
- Former railway station at Halton Holegate

General information
- Location: Halton Holegate, East Lindsey, Lincolnshire; England
- Platforms: 1

Other information
- Status: Disused

History
- Original company: Spilsby and Firsby Railway
- Pre-grouping: Great Northern Railway
- Post-grouping: London and North Eastern Railway; Eastern Region of British Railways

Key dates
- 1 May 1868: Opened
- 10 Sep 1939: Closed to passengers
- 1958: Closed to goods
Location

Halton Holegate Railway Station is a former station in Halton Holegate, Lincolnshire. It was on a short branch from Firsby to Spilsby.

== History of the branch line ==
A small private local railway company built a branch line from Firsby junction to Spilsby, which opened on 1 May 1868. The branch was just over four miles (6 km) long and connected Spilsby to the Kings Cross London to Cleethorpes main line. The necessary parliamentary permission had been obtained by an Act in July 1865 which incorporated the Spilsby & Firsby Railway Company with an authorised capital of £20,000 and loans of £8,333 for the construction of the four-mile (6 km) long, single-track branch.

Construction of the railway began in March 1867. The ceremonial cutting of the first turf was performed by a local rector, The Reverend Rawnsley, who was standing in for the railway company's chairman Lord Willoughby de Eresby the 25th Baron. The Railway was expected to be opened quickly but disputes with the contractors arose over the quality of their work, and several lengths of track had to be replaced. The Great Northern Railway bought out the Spilsby & Firsby Railway Company for £20,000 through an Act of Parliament on 25 July 1890. Halton Holegate was the only other intermediate station on the short branch line.

Passenger services were suspended in 1939. A goods service for grain, potatoes, livestock and other agricultural products continued for nearly 20 years. Goods including petrol, paraffin and coal continued to come into Spilsby via the rail link up to its final closure on 30 November 1958.

== Halton Holegate station ==
Halton Holegate station had a single platform on the upside and the main station building included the station master's residence, a booking office and a small waiting room. Other buildings had a signal box, an engine shed and a cattle pen alongside a loop siding.

The station has been sold into private ownership and the original station building extended as a private residence. The engine shed remains in good condition and the track bed has been infilled to the platform level.

Former Services

Preceding station	Disused railways	Following station
Spilsby	Great Northern Railway; Spilsby branch	Firsby
