= Tumby Woodside railway station =

Former railway station in England

Coordinates: 53.1027°N 0.1022°W

Tumby Woodside
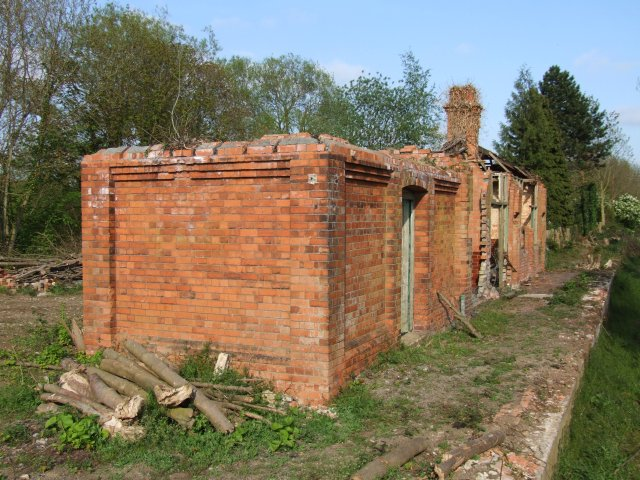
- Remains of the station building in 2007

General information
- Location: Tumby Woodside, East Lindsey, Lincolnshire; England
- Grid reference: TF270578
- Platforms: 2

Other information
- Status: Disused

History
- Pre-grouping: GNR
- Post-grouping: LNER; Eastern Region of British Railways

Key dates
- 1 July 1913: Opened
- 1915: Closed
- 1923: Opened
- 5 October 1970: Closed
Location

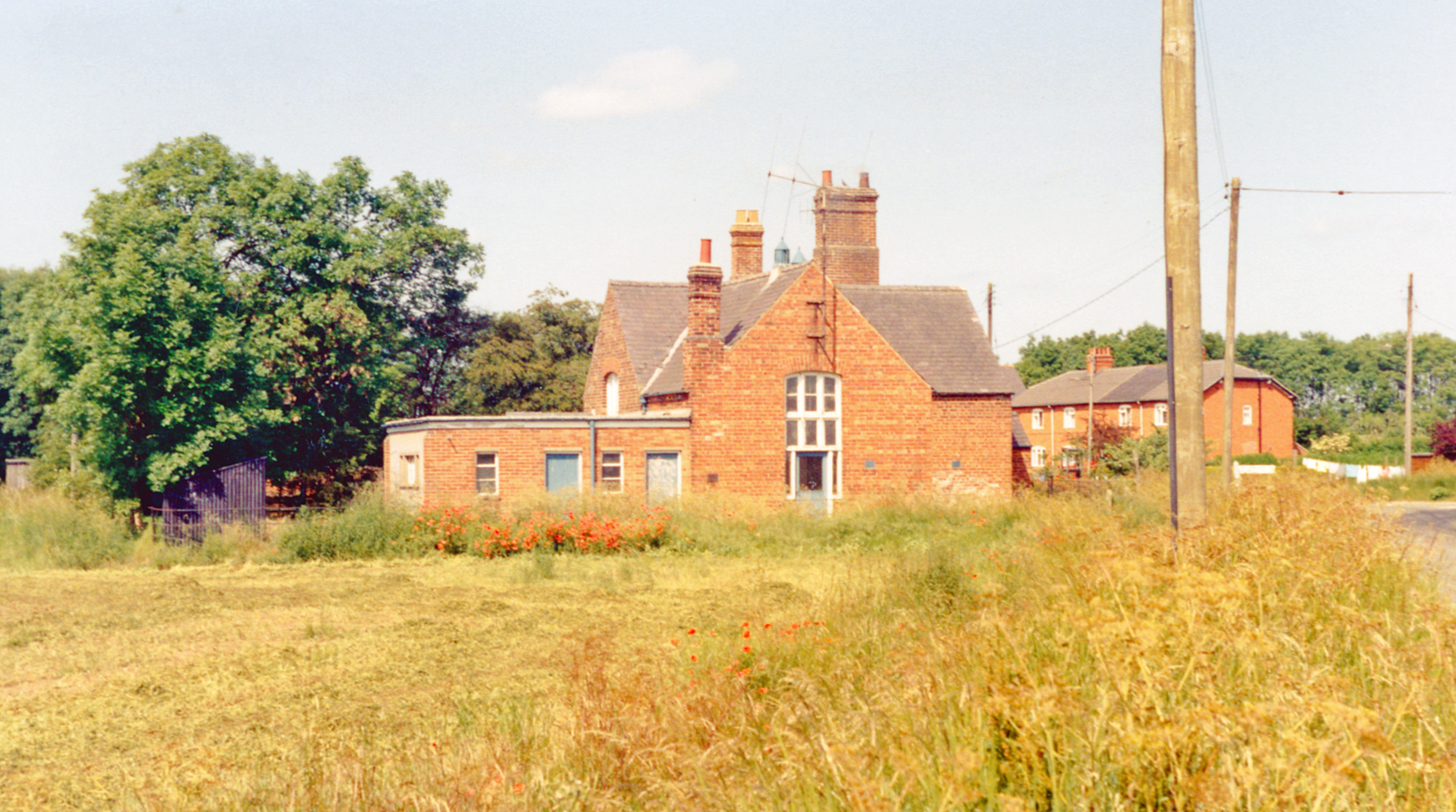
Remains of the station in 1992

Tumby Woodside railway station was a station in Tumby Woodside, Lincolnshire, England on the Kirkstead and Little Steeping Railway which ran between Lincoln and Firsby. The site is now left in an overgrown and unkempt state. The station masters house survives as a private residence. It served the village until closure in 1970 and was immortalised in 1964 in the song "Slow Train" by Flanders and Swann.

Preceding station	Disused railways	Following station
Coningsby; Line and station closed	Great Northern Railway; Kirkstead and Little Steeping Railway	New Bolingbroke; Line and station closed
