= Midville railway station =

Former railway station in Lincolnshire, England

Coordinates: 53.0974°N 0.0687°E

Midville
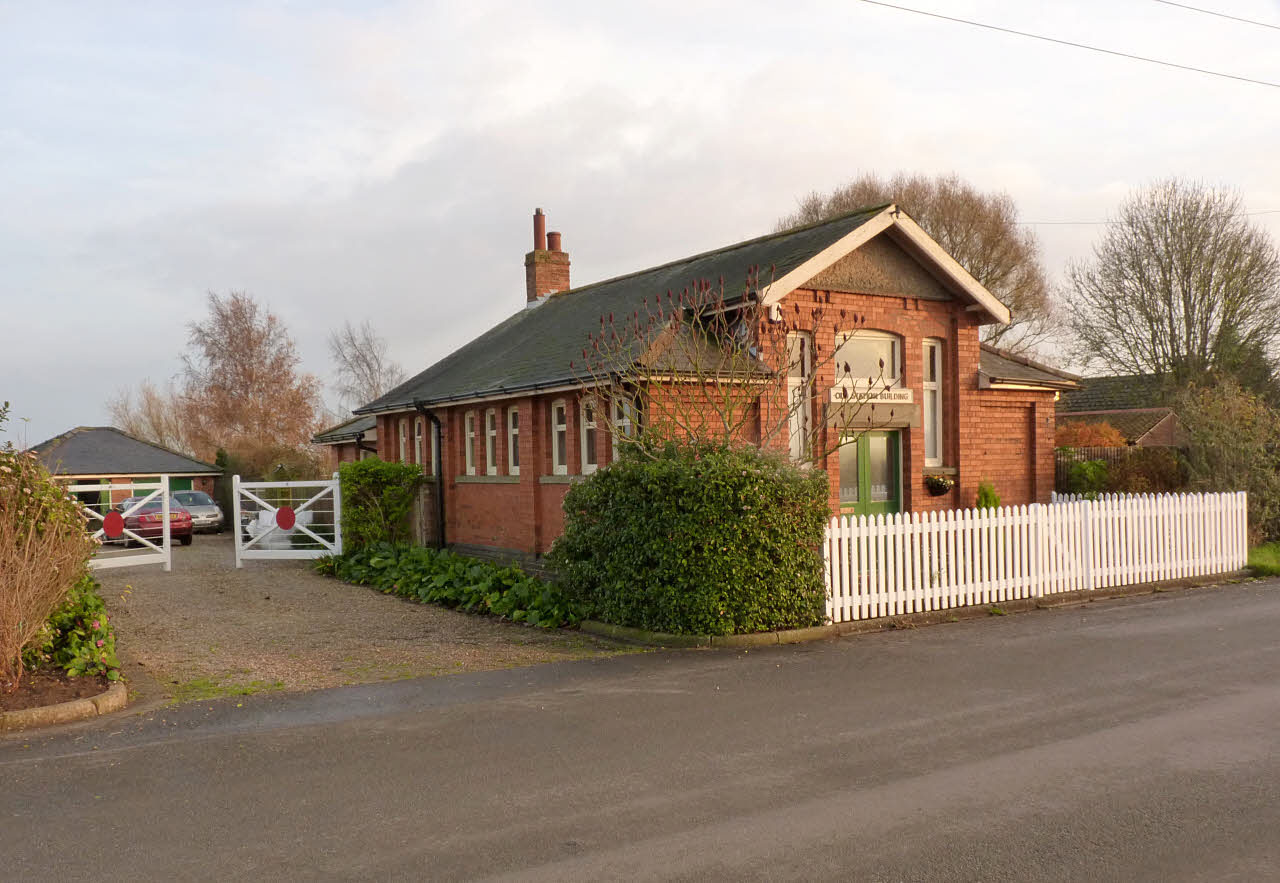
- The station building in 2014, now a private residence

General information
- Location: Midville, East Lindsey, Lincolnshire; England
- Platforms: 2

Other information
- Status: Disused

History
- Pre-grouping: GNR
- Post-grouping: LNER; Eastern Region of British Railways

Key dates
- 1913: Opened
- 1915: Closed
- 1923: Opened
- 1970: Closed
Location

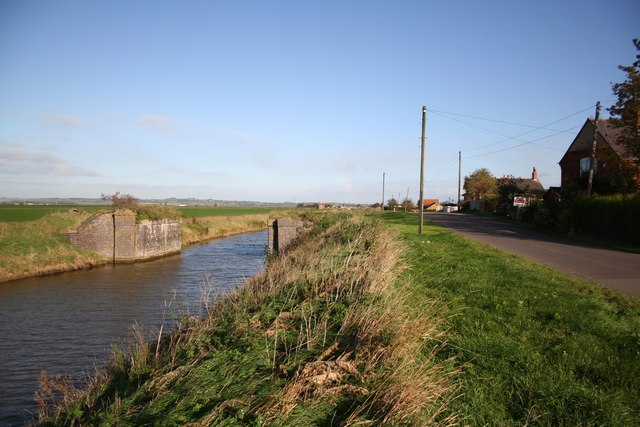
The remains of Station Bridge

Midville railway station was a station in Midville, Lincolnshire, England. It was on the line between Lincoln and Firsby. The station opened in 1913 and closed along with the line in 1970. The station building and masters house are now in private ownership.

Preceding station	Disused railways	Following station
Stickney; Line and station closed	Great Northern Railway; Kirkstead and Little Steeping Railway	Little Steeping; Line and station closed
