= Barnes Wallis Academy =

Location
- Butts Lane; Tattershall, Lincolnshire, LN4 4PN; England
- Coordinates: 53.1063°N 0.1811°W

Information
- Type: Academy
- Local authority: Lincolnshire
- Trust: David Ross Education Trust
- Department for Education URN: 141166 Tables
- Ofsted: Reports
- Headteacher: Charlotte Dunsford
- Gender: Coeducational
- Age: 11 to 16
- Enrolment: 544
- Capacity: 560
- Houses: Dakota; Hurricane; Lancaster; Spitfire
- Website: http://www.barneswallisacademy.co.uk/

Barnes Wallis Academy (formerly Gartree Community School) is a coeducational secondary school located in the village of Tattershall in Lincolnshire, England.

== History ==
In 1950, Woodhall Spa Urban District proposed the idea of a school in Woodhall Spa. Approval for the new school was granted by the Lindsey Education Committee in July 1951, with an estimated cost of £63,659.

The school was designed by architect Denis Clarke Hall (son of Edna Clarke Hall) of the architectural practice Denis Clarke Hall, Scorer & Bright. Construction was carried out by J.T. Barber & Son of Boston, with structural steel-work provided by Robert Stevenson of Norwich. Named after the former Gartree wapentake, the school was built on a 12-acre site with six classrooms and a two-form entry system, designed as the initial phase of a larger development. The final cost was approximately £70,000.

With a capacity for 320 students, the school accommodated 260 students from areas including Mareham-le-Fen, Revesby, Tumby Woodside, Wildmore, and Woodhall Spa. It opened in April 1954.

The official opening ceremony took place on 7 October 1954, attended by Lincolnshire MP Harry Crookshank (Minister of Health from 1951 - 1952). Other attendees included Lt-Col Sir Weston Cracroft-Amcotts (Chairman of the Lindsey County Council), and Frederick Birkbeck (Director of Education for Lindsey). The school’s first headmaster was Mr. D. Parkin.

In July 1955, Douglas Valder Duff spoke at the school's prize day. The following year, Sir John Maitland, the local Conservative MP and former Royal Navy Commander, addressed students during speech day, noting that secondary modern schools were in an experimental phase but noted the progress made at Gartree.

In 1970, additional buildings were constructed to accommodate 150 more students in response to the expansion of RAF Coningsby as a key fighter station. The new facilities included a hall, two art and crafts rooms, a metalwork room, a technical drawing room, two house craft rooms, and three science laboratories, along with upgraded dining facilities, costing £100,904.

In July 1973, Sir Lawrence Byford, Chief Constable of Lincolnshire Police (1973–1977), spoke at the prize day.

== Governance ==
Gartree Community School, formerly administered by Lincolnshire County Council as a foundation school, transitioned to academy status on 1 September 2014 and was renamed Barnes Wallis Academy. The school is sponsored by the David Ross Education Trust and continues to collaborate with Lincolnshire County Council for admissions.

== Curriculum ==
Students are grouped for core subjects based on Key Stage 2 data, with groupings reviewed periodically to balance comfort and challenge.

=== Key Stage 3 ===
Key Stage 3 subjects studied include; English, Mathematics, Science (Biology, Chemistry, and Physics), Geography, History, French, Information Technology, Music, Art, Design and Technology, Food Preparation and Nutrition, PSYCHE, Religious Studies, and Physical Education.

=== Key Stage 4 ===
Compulsory Key Stage 4 subjects are; English (Language and Literature), Mathematics, Science (Combined or specified options), and a Humanities subject (History or Geography). French is commonly studied, alongside three or four additional subjects chosen for GCSE, BTEC, or NCFE qualifications.

== Ofsted inspections and rating ==
Following a full inspection on 5 July 2017, Ofsted rated the academy as "Good."

The most recent inspection on 6 December 2022 reaffirmed the "Good" rating.
