= Little Steeping railway station =

Former railway station in Lincolnshire, England

Little Steeping
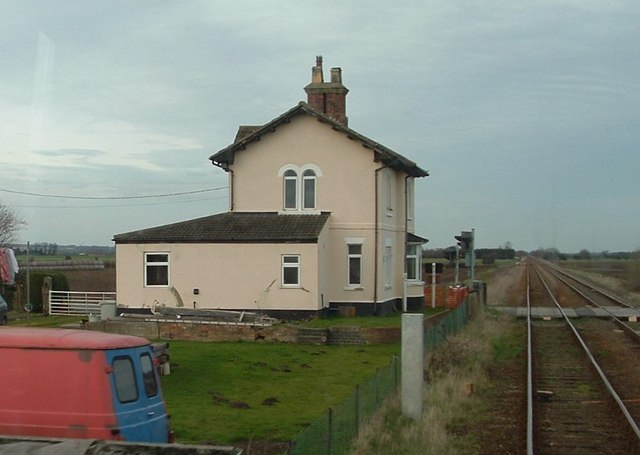

General information
- Location: Little Steeping, East Lindsey; England
- Coordinates: 53.12804°N 0.14557°E
- Platforms: 2

Other information
- Status: Disused

History
- Original company: East Lincolnshire Railway
- Pre-grouping: Great Northern Railway
- Post-grouping: London and North Eastern Railway; Eastern Region of British Railways

Key dates
- 2 October 1848: Opened
- 1 June 1913: Becomes junction station
- 11 September 1961: Closed to passenger traffic
- 15 June 1964: Closed to goods traffic
- 5 October 1970: Closure of the Kirkstead and Little Steeping Line
Location

Little Steeping was a railway station on the East Lincolnshire Railway which served the hamlet of Little Steeping in Lincolnshire between 1848 and 1964. It became a junction station in June 1913 when the Kirkstead and Little Steeping Railway was opened to provide a more direct route to Skegness for East Midlands holidaymakers. Withdrawal of passenger services took place in 1961, followed by goods facilities in 1964. The line through the station remains in use as the Poacher Line, although the Kirkstead and Little Steeping Railway closed throughout on 5 October 1970.

== History ==
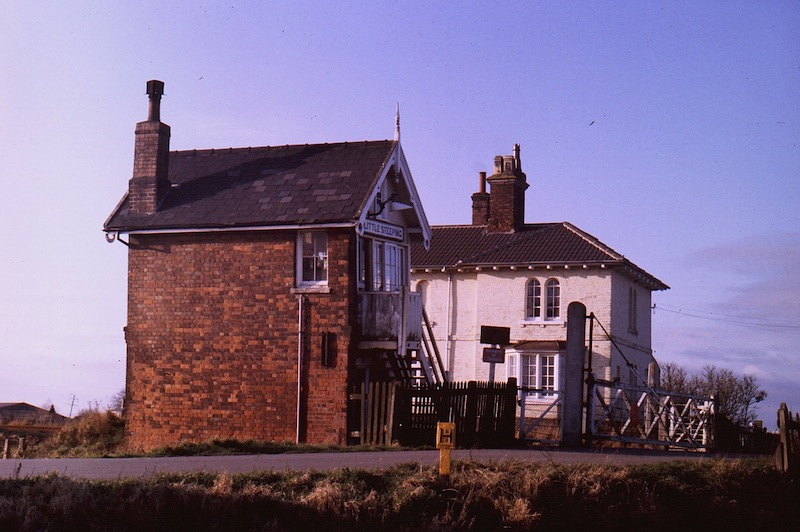
Little Steeping station, January 1984

The station was opened on 2 October 1848 to serve the hamlet of Little Steeping. It was constructed by Peto and Betts civil engineering contractors who, in January 1848, had taken over the contract to construct the section of the East Lincolnshire Railway between Louth and Boston from John Waring and Sons. This section was the last to be completed in September 1848 at an agreed cost of £123,000 (equivalent to £15,600,000 in 2023). The station was provided with two platforms: a signal box was built on the up platform and the main station buildings were on the down platform. The signal box was situated near the level crossing over a minor road linking Little Steeping with Great Steeping to the north. A farm crossing at Ings Lane to the north of the station at grid reference TF445623 was the location of a fatal accident in November 1897 when Tom Odlin was killed whilst crossing the line in foggy weather with a corn wagon drawn by two horses, the wagon being pushed down the line for some distance.

The Kirkstead and Little Steeping Railway between Woodhall Junction to Little Steeping opened to goods traffic on 1 June 1913 and to passengers one month later. This saw four trains each way between Lincoln and Skegness travel through Little Steeping, together with an express service from Sheffield. This added to the five up and four down services and one Sunday service each way on the East Lincolnshire Line. A new 25-lever Saxby & Farmer signal box was opened at Bellwater Junction to the south of Little Steeping station where what became known as the "New Line" joined the East Lincolnshire Line; this replaced a four-lever ground frame next to what had been an occupation crossing with a crossing keeper's cottage. The station was closed to passengers on 11 September 1961 and to goods traffic on 15 June 1964. The last day of operation of the New Line was Saturday 3 October 1970.

Preceding station	Historical railways	Following station
Firsby; Line partly open, station closed	Great Northern Railway; East Lincolnshire Line	East Ville; Line open, station closed
	Disused railways	
Midville; Line and station closed	Great Northern Railway; Kirkstead and Little Steeping Railway	Terminus

== Present day ==
The station building still remains as a house while the line through the station continues to be used by services on the Poacher Line between Grantham and Skegness.

== Sources ==
- Butt, R. V. J. (October 1995). The Directory of Railway Stations: details every public and private passenger station, halt, platform and stopping place, past and present (1st ed.). Sparkford: Patrick Stephens Ltd. ISBN 978-1-85260-508-7. OCLC 60251199. OL 11956311M.
- Clinker, C.R. (October 1978). Clinker's Register of Closed Passenger Stations and Goods Depots in England, Scotland and Wales 1830-1977. Bristol: Avon-Anglia Publications & Services. ISBN 0-905466-19-5.
- Ludlam, A.J. (1997). Railways to Skegness including Kirkstead to Little Steeping (Locomotive Papers No. 205). Usk, Mon.: The Oakwood Press. ISBN 0-85361-518-7.
- Ludlam, A.J. (1991). The East Lincolnshire Railway (Locomotive Papers No. 82). Headington, Oxford: The Oakwood Press. ISBN 0-85361-416-4.
- Conolly, W. Philip (2004) [1958]. British Railways Pre-Grouping Atlas and Gazetteer. Hersham, Surrey: Ian Allan Ltd. ISBN 978-0-7110-0320-0.
