= Midville, Lincolnshire =

Village in Lincolnshire, England

Coordinates: 53.091550°N 0.067529°E

Midville
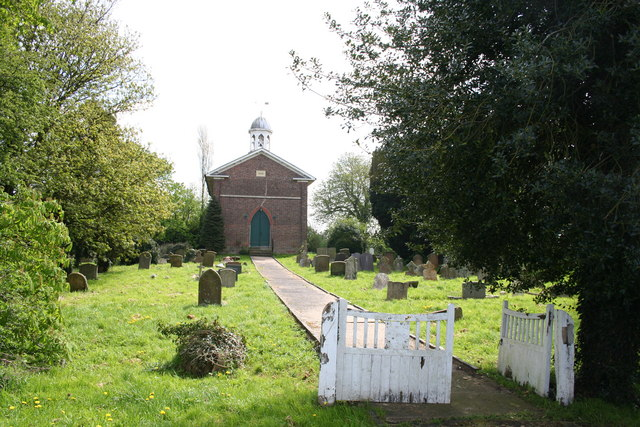
- Church of St Peter, Midville

- Location within Lincolnshire
- Population: 153 (2011)
- OS grid reference: TF385569
  - London: 110 mi (180 km) S
- District: East Lindsey
- Shire county: Lincolnshire
- Region: East Midlands
- Country: England
- Sovereign state: United Kingdom
- Post town: Boston
- Postcode district: PE22
- Police: Lincolnshire
- Fire: Lincolnshire
- Ambulance: East Midlands
- UK Parliament: Boston and Skegness

Midville is a small village and civil parish in the East Lindsey district of Lincolnshire, England. It is situated about 10 miles (16 km) north from Boston.

The village was an extra-parochial allotment of the East Fen, which was drained between 1802 and 1813, and was constituted as a parochial township by an act of Parliament passed in 1885. The East Fen is between Boston and Spilsby.

Midville church was built in 1819–20 and is a plain edifice of Georgian brick.

Midville railway station opened in 1913, and closed in 1970.
