= New Bolingbroke railway station =

Former railway station in Lincolnshire, England

Coordinates: 53.1001°N 0.0484°W

New Bolingbroke
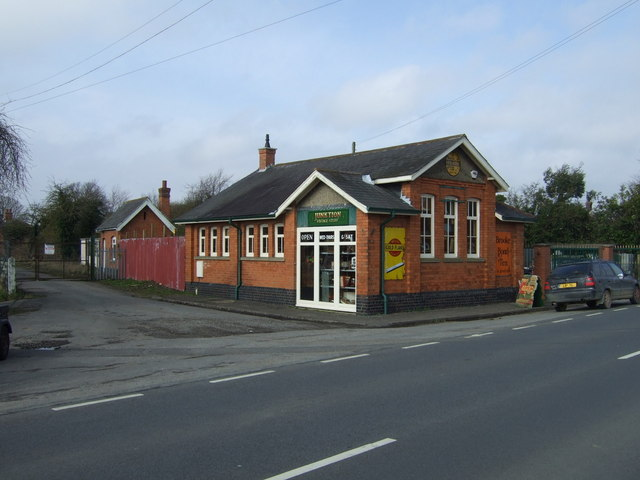
- New Bolingbroke station in 2014, now in use for antiques and reclaimers yard known as "Junktion Antiques".

General information
- Location: New Bolingbroke, East Lindsey, Lincolnshire; England
- Platforms: 2

Other information
- Status: Disused

History
- Pre-grouping: GNR
- Post-grouping: LNER; Eastern Region of British Railways

Key dates
- 1913: Opened
- 1915: Closed
- 1923: Opened
- 1970: Closed
Location

New Bolingbroke railway station was a station which served the village of New Bolingbroke in East Lindsey, Lincolnshire, England. The station was on the Kirkstead and Little Steeping Railway which ran between Lincoln and Firsby. The branch line was sometimes called the "New Line". The station and line opened in 1913 and closed in 1970. The site is now occupied by a reclaimers and antiques yard.

Preceding station	Disused railways	Following station
Tumby Woodside; Line and station closed	Great Northern Railway; Kirkstead and Little Steeping Railway	Stickney; Line and station closed
