= William Macbride Childs =

English academic administrator and historian

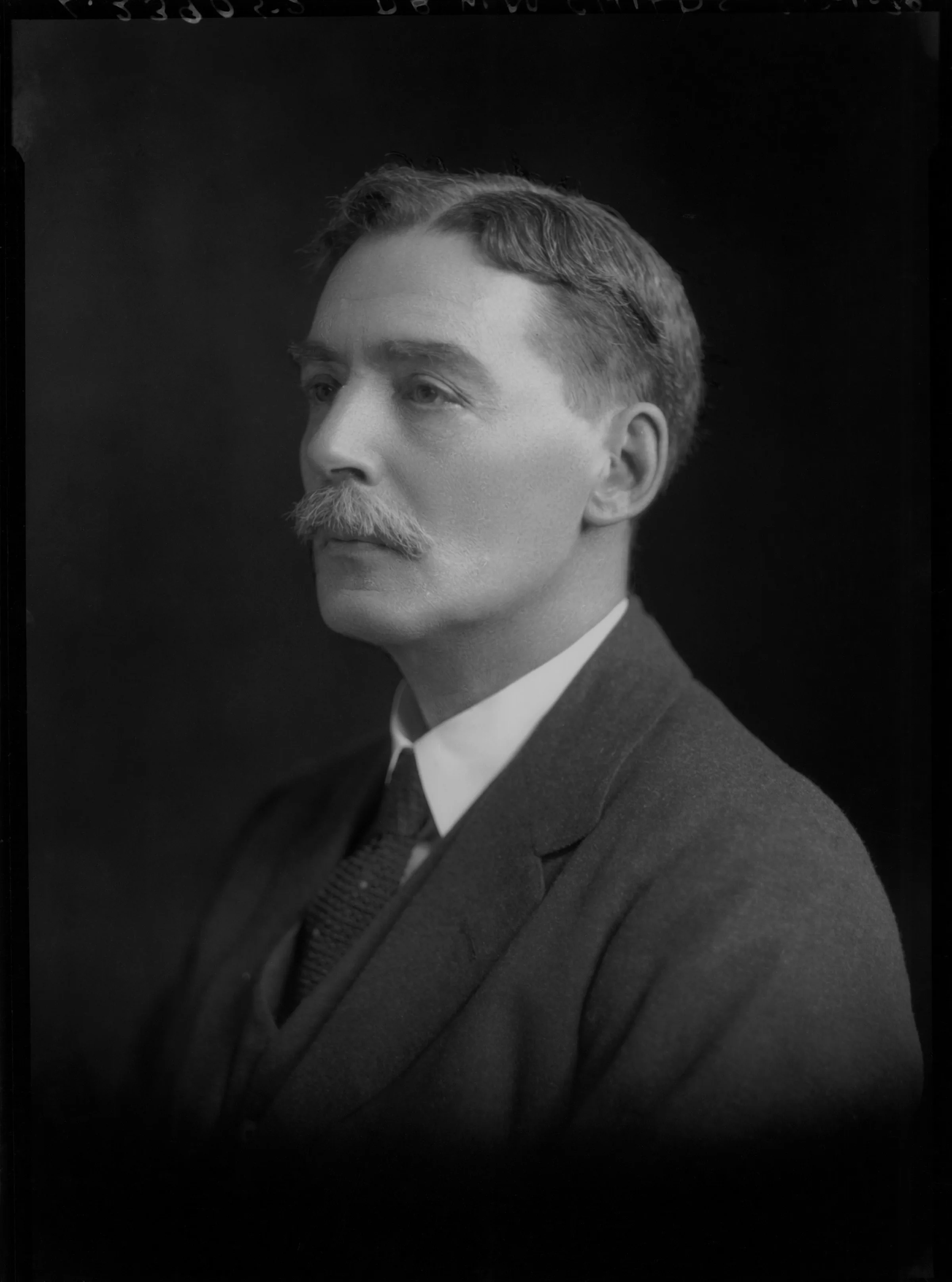
Childs in 1929

William Macbride Childs (1869–1939) was an English academic administrator and historian, who was involved in the foundation of the University of Reading and who served briefly as its first vice-chancellor.

== Biography ==
Childs was born, on 3 January 1869, in the village of Carrington, situated some 8 miles (13 km) north of Boston in Lincolnshire. He was the son of the Revd William Linington Childs, vicar of Carrington, and his second wife, Henrietta Fowles Bell. He had no brothers or sisters, but had a half-brother and two half-sisters by his father's first marriage. He attended Portsmouth Grammar School and graduated from Keble College of the University of Oxford in 1891.

In 1892 Childs served briefly as a secretary to Sir Arthur Dyke Acland, who at the time was Vice-President of the Committee on Education, the cabinet post that then supervised education in the United Kingdom. In 1893 he became a lecturer in history at the University College in Reading, being promoted to vice-principal in 1900.

In 1897, Childs married Catherine Emma Pollard, alumna of Somerville College, Oxford where she obtained a first class Zoology. She became the first female lecturer at the University of Reading and was awarded an MBE for her work in running a hospital during the war.

In 1903 Childs succeeded Halford Mackinder as principal of the college. He made it his aim to turn the college into a University, working to this end by attracting students from a distance with hostels and, eventually, halls of residence. He also raised funds from prominent local residents, including George William Palmer and Alfred Palmer, both proprietors of Huntley & Palmers, and Harriet Loyd-Lindsay, wife of Robert, 1st Baron Wantage. His first application for a charter, in 1920, was turned down, but a second application, in 1925, succeeded. In 1926, when the University of Reading officially received that charter, Childs became the first vice-chancellor, being born aloft by his students and carried around the grounds.

Childs retired at the age of 60, in 1929. He died on 21 June 1939 at his home at Hermitage in Berkshire. Childs Hall, a hall of residence on the University of Reading's Whiteknights Park campus, is named in honour of William Macbride Childs.
