= New Bolingbroke =

Village in the East Lindsey district of Lincolnshire, England

Coordinates: 53.103713°N 0.047491°W

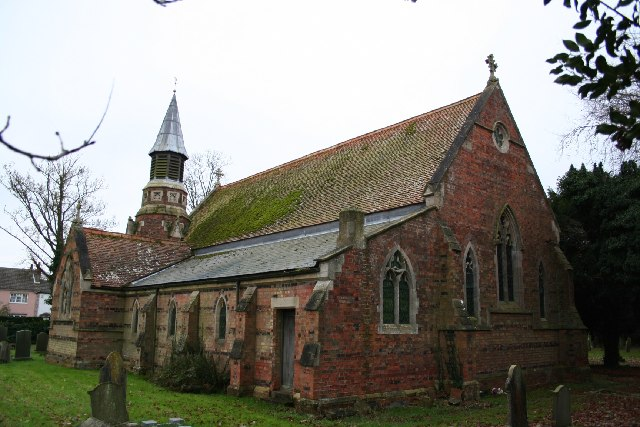
- St Peter's Church, New Bolingbroke

- Location within Lincolnshire
- OS grid reference: TF308580
  - London: 110 mi (180 km) S
- Civil parish: Carrington and New Bolingbroke
- District: East Lindsey
- Shire county: Lincolnshire
- Region: East Midlands
- Country: England
- Sovereign state: United Kingdom
- Post town: Boston
- Postcode district: PE22
- Police: Lincolnshire
- Fire: Lincolnshire
- Ambulance: East Midlands
- UK Parliament: Boston and Skegness

New Bolingbroke is a village in the civil parish of Carrington and New Bolingbroke, in the East Lindsey district of Lincolnshire, England. It is in the Lincolnshire Fens, and is about 6 miles (10 km) east from Coningsby. The village was established by John Parkinson, who was a steward to Sir Joseph Banks.

== Landmarks ==
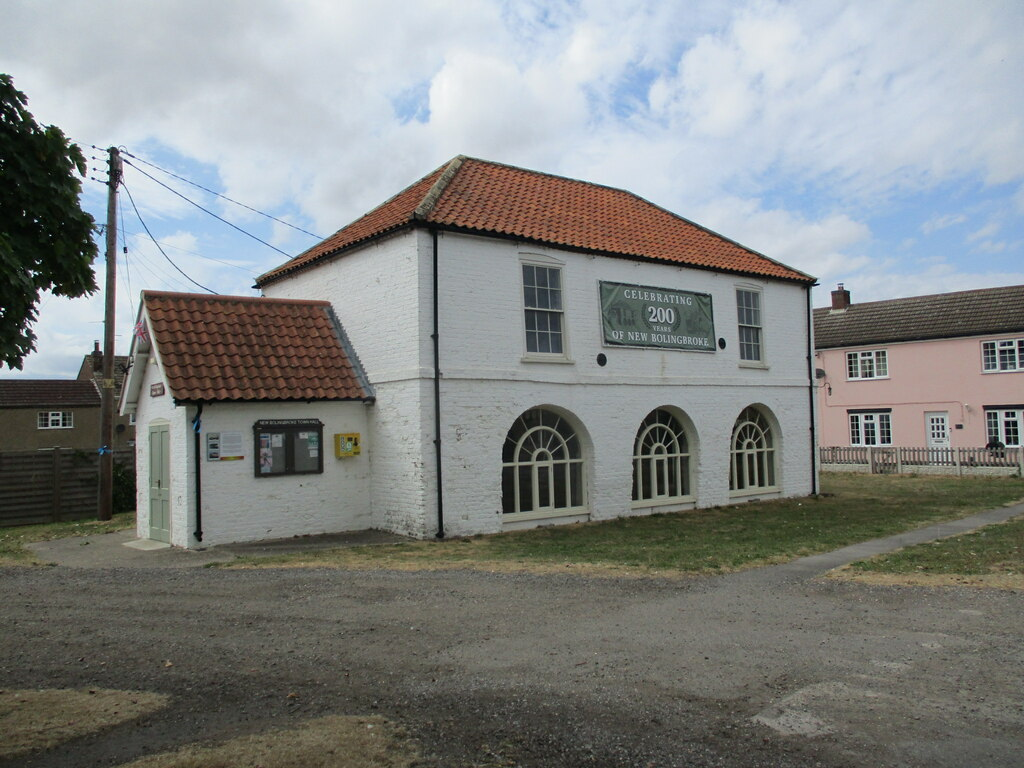
New Bolingbroke Town Hall

Built in the 1820s, the village hall continues to be called the New Bolingbroke Town Hall, the name it was given when John Parkinson established New Bolingbroke with the aspiration of it becoming a market town. It is a Grade II listed building.

New Bolingbroke Church, dedicated to St Peter, was built in 1854 by Samuel Sanders Teulon. It is a Grade II listed building.

The Crescent, a curved line of red-brick shops and houses, was built in 1823 by John Parkinson to house the workers of his weaving factory; the houses are now all privately owned. The Crescent is Grade II listed.

New Bolingbroke had two working windmills. One, Rundles Mill, is Grade II Listed and dates from the mid-19th century, and has been disused since at least 1906. Made of red brick, it is a tower mill. The other, Watkinsons Mill, dates from 1821 and is also Grade II listed. It was working until 1944 when the weather beam broke. It continued with an engine for a time, but today only the stump remains, which is used as a store.

New Bolingbroke railway station was sited here.

== See also ==
- New Bolingbroke railway station
