= Carrington, Lincolnshire =

Village and civil parish in Lincolnshire, England

Coordinates: 53.080290°N 0.044675°W

Carrington
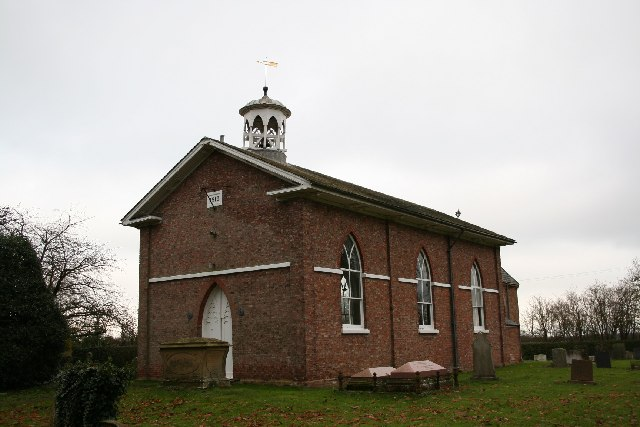
- Church of Saint Paul, Carrington

- Location within Lincolnshire
- Population: 554 (Including New Bolingbroke. 2011 census)
- OS grid reference: TF310554
  - London: 110 mi (180 km) S
- Civil parish: Carrington and New Bolingbroke
- District: East Lindsey
- Shire county: Lincolnshire
- Region: East Midlands
- Country: England
- Sovereign state: United Kingdom
- Post town: Boston
- Postcode district: PE22
- Police: Lincolnshire
- Fire: Lincolnshire
- Ambulance: East Midlands
- UK Parliament: Boston and Skegness

Carrington is a village in the civil parish of Carrington and New Bolingbroke, in the East Lindsey district of Lincolnshire, England. It is situated approximately 7 miles (11 km) north from the market town of Boston.

It lies within The Fens and was largely uninhabited marshland until the early nineteenth century. Drainage of an area known as West Fen began in 1802, and in 1812 a township called Carrington was created covering some of the drained land, named after Robert Smith, 1st Baron Carrington, the main landowner. The township became a civil parish in 1858. The civil parish of Carrington also included New Bolingbroke, 1.5 miles (2.4 km) to the north. The parish was renamed "Carrington and New Bolingbroke" in November 2022, at which point the parish council also declared the parish to be a town, allowing it to take the style "town council" and appoint a mayor. The parish also contains the hamlet of Medlam. The parish has a population of 564 according to the 2001 census, reducing slightly to 554 at the 2011 Census.

Carrington church is dedicated to St Paul, and was built of red brick in 1816 under the Fen Chapel Act (1816), with its chancel being added in 1872. It is a Grade II listed building. Carrington and New Bolingbroke were separate ecclesiastical parishes until 1961 when they were united.

Carrington's school, the Medlam School, was opened in February 1881 by the West Fen United District School Board which existed from 1879 to 1903. By the time of its closure in 1987 it was known as Carrington County Primary School. Children now attend school in nearby Stickney.

Carrington Rally is an annual event which has taken place each spring for over 50 years, and is a steam and tractor show which supports local charities.

The Carrington Glasshouse of Dyson Farming is based in Carrington. It is six hectares in size and 424 meters in length, with 700,000 strawberry plants.

== Notable people ==
Carrington was the birthplace of William Macbride Childs, the son of the Revd William Linington Childs, vicar of Carrington, and first vice-chancellor of the University of Reading.
