= Kirkstead and Little Steeping Railway =

UK railway line

Overview
- Locale: England
- Dates of operation: 1913–1970
- Successor: British Rail (Eastern Region)

Technical
- Track gauge: 4 ft 8 1/2 in (1,435 mm)
- Length: 15 mi (24 km)

The Kirkstead and Little Steeping Railway, locally known as the New Line, was a railway line in England built to shorten the route between Lincoln and Firsby in Lincolnshire, England.

It was built by the Great Northern Railway (GNR), and opened as a double track line in 1913. It was authorised under a light railway order, which simplified the legal process. Long distance holiday and excursion passenger trains to the east coast resorts were routed over the line, which also carried an ordinary rural passenger and goods service.

To support the war effort during World War One, in 1915 the line was closed and the materials from one track were lifted and sent to France for tactical use there. The track was reinstated and normal operation was resumed in 1923.

When the direct line from Lincoln to Boston was closed east of Coningsby Junction in 1960, some Lincoln stopping trains ran to Coningsby to terminate their journeys. The New Line itself was closed on 5 October 1970.

== Before the New Line ==
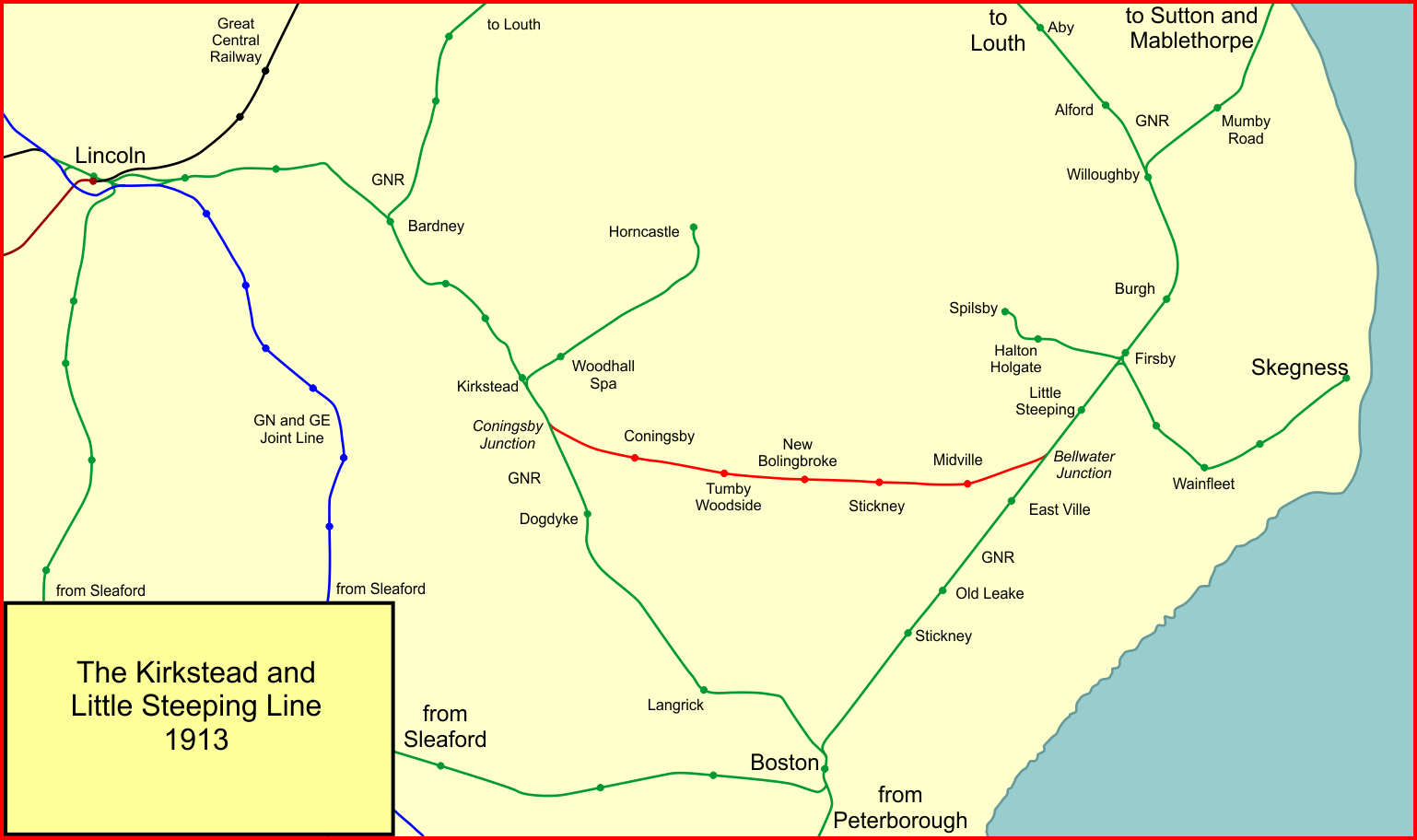
The Kirkstead New Line

In 1848 the Great Northern Railway opened two main lines: part of its Loop Line (or Lincolnshire Loop) from Boston to Lincoln, and the East Lincolnshire Line from Boston to Grimsby. The GNR leased the East Lincolnshire Line from the owning company. From the 1860s seaside holidays and excursions became increasingly popular, and a nominally independent branch line was opened from Firsby to Skegness in 1873. Mablethorpe was connected to the East Lincolnshire Line at Louth in 1877 and additionally at Willoughby further south, in 1888. The railway connections encouraged the huge popularity of the seaside, and the towns and the railways did excellent business in the season.

The approach to Skegness and Mablethorpe from the Midlands was rather circuitous, involving a sweep through Boston, reversing there in the case of trains running via Lincoln.

== Demand for a quicker route ==
Although the GNR thought it had treated Skegness well, the town council approached the GNR chairman in November 1910, asking for a better passenger train service from Manchester, Birmingham, and Leeds. They suggested a new line from Spilsby to or through Horncastle, shortening the journey to Lincoln and beyond. They said they would ask the Midland Railway, which ran to Lincoln from Nottingham, for help if the GNR would not do something. The GNR board undertook to investigate an alternative new line, and promised improved services. In the summer of 1911, the long-distance trains were indeed improved and accelerated.

In April, the board noted that a light railway from Kirkstead to Little Steeping would give a more direct route from the north, Manchester, Sheffield, and Lincoln, avoiding the Boston reversal. The estimated cost was £207,164; the board approved this scheme. The Light Railway Commissioners held an inquiry at Boston on 18 July, and granted the Great Northern (Kirkstead and Little Steeping) Light Railway Order 1911, and this was confirmed on 27 December 1911. The light railway authorisation did not impose any particular restrictions on the operation of the line when completed, but merely streamlined the legal authorisation process in non-controversial situations.

No time was lost in getting on with the construction of the line. A tender from a Mr Arnold for the earthworks and track in the amount of £93,993 was accepted in February 1912. McKenzie and Holland supplied the signals.

== Opening ==
The line was 15 miles in length; it was built as a double line. It opened for all traffic on 1 July 1913. (Note: Wrottesley says 1 August 1913.) There were stations at Coningsby, Tumby Woodside, New Bolingbroke, Stickney and Midville. In summer through carriages from Manchester and Sheffield, and the Leeds train, were diverted to the new route, besides services to Sutton-on-Sea and Mablethorpe. Local traffic was always slight, usually four trains each way daily between Lincoln and Skegness. It was immediately dubbed "The New Line" by railwaymen, and so it remained for all its life.

== World War I ==
During World War I heavy holiday traffic continued to the Lincolnshire coastal resorts in the 1915 and 1916 summers. The Kirkstead and Little Steeping line was less than two years old, and its passenger service was reduced to two each way by May 1915, but a daily Lincoln-Skegness through train continued throughout the war.

There was pressure to release track materials considered to be able to be spared, for use in France as part of the war effort. The GNR board decided to lift one of the two tracks on the Kirkstead-Little Steeping line for the purpose. Squires says that the line was "closed as part of the railway's effort to reduce their consumption of coal. Relaying of the missing track began in June 1922, and the line reopened the following year," and Leleux says that the line was "closed between 1915 and 1923 as a coal economy measure". These statements appear to be mistaken; the line seems never to have closed, merely to have been singled. Anderson says "every station remained open" and Quick, usually meticulous in temporary closures, does not show any suspension.

== After 1945 ==
After World War II the popularity of the seaside resorts at Skegness, Mablethorpe and Sutton on Sea was restored, and through holiday trains resumed in summer. Nevertheless, the ordinary traffic of the district declined as passenger and goods transport transferred to roads.

It was the line from Coningsby Junction to Boston that closed first, on 17 June 1963, due to an accumulated backlog of track and signalling renewals, the cost of which was considered insupportable in the context of the line's earnings. RAF Coningsby was still a busy RAF station generating a significant passenger traffic, and trains from Lincoln were diverted to Coningsby or Tumby Woodside to serve the RAF passengers, who would otherwise have used Dogdyke; there were three such trains daily. For the time being the Skegness ordinary passenger trains continued. Goods facilities were withdrawn on 30 March 1964. As an economy measure, the stations on the New Line became unstaffed halts from 7 October 1968; tickets were issued on the train by conductor guards. By 1970, Tumby Woodside was the terminus for three trains each way daily from Lincoln, the remainder of the branch served only by four Lincoln to Firsby trains, and three in the opposite direction.

The New Line closed on 5 October 1970, along with most of the rest of the East Lincolnshire network.

== Present day ==
Most of the stations along the line survive except for Stickney and Coningsby which have been demolished with Stickney being occupied by an industrial unit and Coningsby being left landscaped. Little Steeping survives as a private residence and the line remains in use. Midville is now under private ownership. New Bolingbroke is now in use as a reclaimers and antiques yard. Tumby Woodside has been left neglected and abandoned with the platforms still in situ as well as the decaying station building.Woodhall Junction is now in private ownership with the former line to Lincoln now in use for the Water Rail Way trail.

== Location list ==
All stations opened 1 July 1913, and closed 5 October 1970;

- Coningsby Junction;
- Coningsby;
- Tumby Woodside;
- New Bolingbroke;
- Stickney;
- Midville;
- Bellwater Junction.
