= Tumby, Lincolnshire =

Village in the East Lindsey district of Lincolnshire, England

Coordinates: 53°07′17″N 0°09′02″W

Tumby
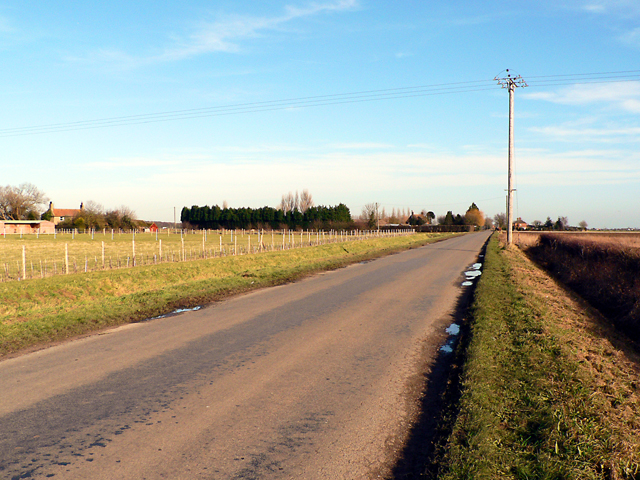
- Towards Tumby Woodside

- Location within Lincolnshire
- Population: 203 (2011)
- OS grid reference: TF242606
  - London: 115 mi (185 km) S
- Civil parish: Tumby
- District: East Lindsey
- Shire county: Lincolnshire
- Region: East Midlands
- Country: England
- Sovereign state: United Kingdom
- Post town: Boston
- Postcode district: PE22
- Police: Lincolnshire
- Fire: Lincolnshire
- Ambulance: East Midlands
- UK Parliament: Louth and Horncastle

Tumby is a village and civil parish in the East Lindsey district of Lincolnshire, England. It is situated approximately 2 miles (3.2 km) north from Coningsby and 6.5 miles (10.5 km) south from Horncastle. In 2011 the parish had a population of 203.

== Tumby Woodside ==
Tumby Woodside is a hamlet about 3 miles (4.8 km) south-east of the village of Tumby. The woods are of oak and larch. In the 15th century it belonged to Ralph, Lord Cromwell, and was also known as Tumby Chase.

Tumby Woodside railway station opened here in 1913 serving the Great Northern Railway, and closed in 1970.

A Wesleyan Methodist chapel was founded in Tumby Woodside in 1818 and was rebuilt in 1897. It closed in 2004. There was formerly an Anglican church dedicated to St Lawrence, in the neighbouring hamlet of Moorhouses, built by James Fowler in 1875. This is also closed.

The Tumby estate was owned by the Hawley baronets.

The murderer Ethel Major was daughter of the estate gamekeeper and was born and raised in a lodge on the estate.

== Tumby Moorside ==
Tumby Moorside is a hamlet about 2 miles (3.2 km) south of Tumby, and 1.5 miles (2.4 km) west of Tumby Woodside. In the 15th century it belonged to Lord Willoughby, who died leaving his estate to his wife, Maud, who then married Sir Thomas Neville, and later Sir Gervaise Clifton. In 1466 Gervaise and Maud Clifton granted Sir Anthony Wydville (or Wydevile), Lord Scales, the manor of Tumby, with the exception of Tumby Woodside which belonged to Ralph, Lord Cromwell.

High House Museum is at Tumby Moorside, and is a Grade II listed building dating from the 18th century. A 17th-century barn located at the farmhouse is also Grade II listed.

== Fulsby ==
Fulsby is a hamlet located on the River Bain north of Tumby. It was listed in Domesday Book of 1086 as having 4 households, 8 acres (32,000 m^{2}) of meadow and 120 acres (0.5 km^{2}) of woodland. Most of Fulsby Wood is classified as semi-natural woodland, with the rest as plantation.

In the seventeenth century Fulsby was the home of the Cressey family.

Tumby Wood is a nature reserve and Site of Special Scientific Interest. The rents on a small farm at Fulsby were used by the trustees of the will of Sir John Nelthorpe to maintain Brigg Grammar School, and two poor boys from Legsby or Fulsby were educated, clothed, and looked-after by the school.

== Gallery ==
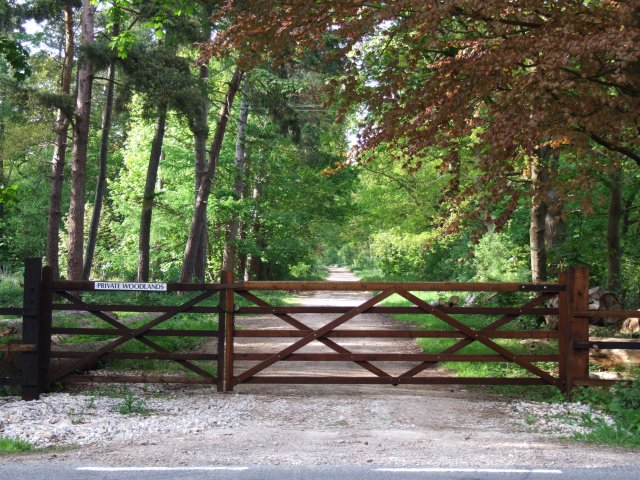
Fulsby Wood

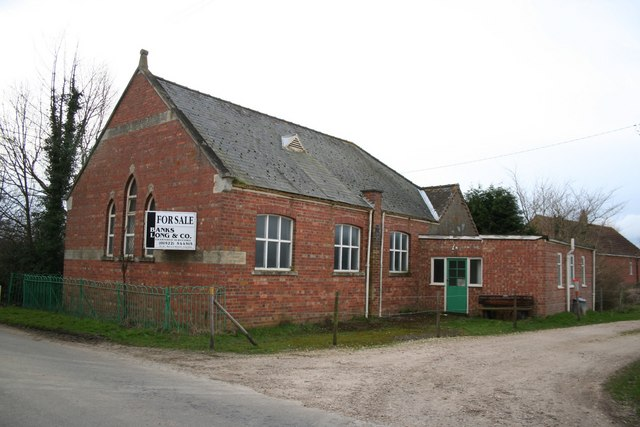
Disused Wesleyan Chapel

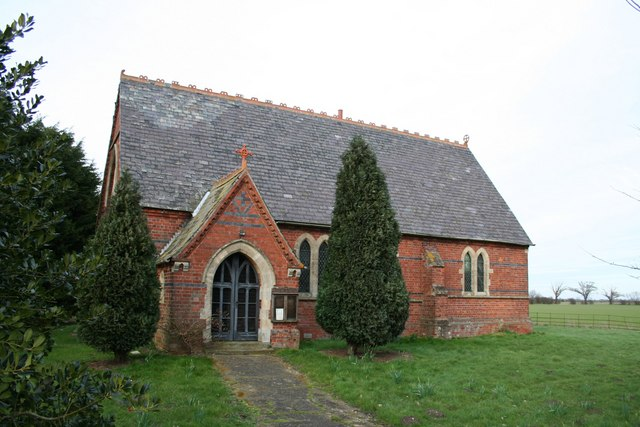
Disused St Lawrence's Church
