= Little Steeping =

Village and civil parish in Lincolnshire, England

Coordinates: 53.142780°N 0.148525°E

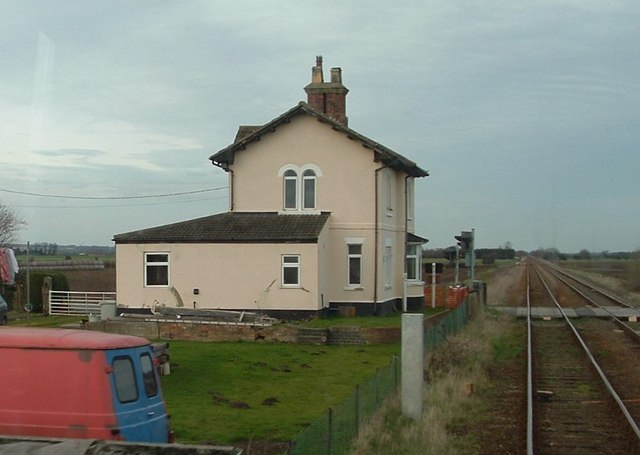
- Little Steeping railway station

- Location within Lincolnshire
- Population: 212 (2011 Census)
- OS grid reference: TF438627
  - London: 115 mi (185 km) S
- Civil parish: Little Steeping
- District: East Lindsey
- Shire county: Lincolnshire
- Region: East Midlands
- Country: England
- Sovereign state: United Kingdom
- Post town: Spilsby
- Postcode district: PE23
- Police: Lincolnshire
- Fire: Lincolnshire
- Ambulance: East Midlands
- UK Parliament: Boston and Skegness

Little Steeping is a village and civil parish in the East Lindsey district of Lincolnshire, England, about 3 miles (5 km) south-east from the town of Spilsby.

The parish church is dedicated to Saint Andrew, and is a Grade II* listed building. It dates from the 14th century, with alterations in 1638 and 1701, and later restorations. A cross in the churchyard is Grade II listed and a scheduled monument.

Little Steeping Parochial School opened in 1871 and was enlarged in 1904. It closed on 26 July 1963.

The Little Steeping railway station opened on 2 October 1848 for the Great Northern Railway, and closed 15 June 1964. It had two narrow platforms with the main station buildings on the down side of the line, and the signalbox opposite on the up side.
