= Firsby =

Village in Lincolnshire, England

Coordinates: 53.14703°N 0.17557°E

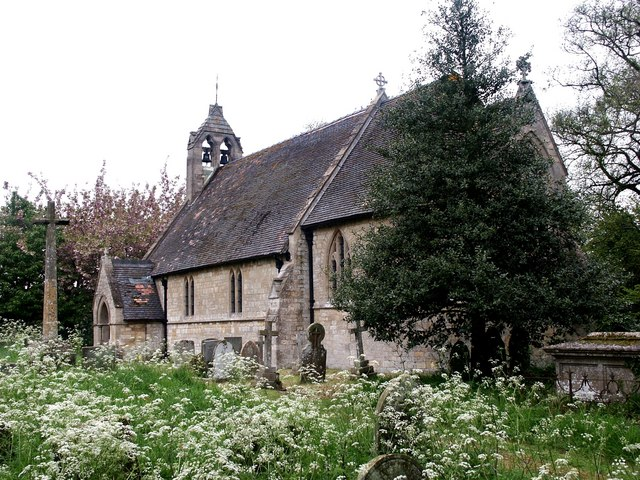
- St Andrew's Church, Firsby

- Location within Lincolnshire
- Population: 278
- OS grid reference: TF455633
  - London: 115 mi (185 km)
- Civil parish: Firsby
- District: East Lindsey
- Shire county: Lincolnshire
- Region: East Midlands
- Country: England
- Sovereign state: United Kingdom
- Post town: SPILSBY
- Postcode district: PE23
- Dialling code: 01754
- Police: Lincolnshire
- Fire: Lincolnshire
- Ambulance: East Midlands
- UK Parliament: Boston and Skegness

Firsby is a small rural linear village and civil parish in the East Lindsey district of Lincolnshire, England. It is situated 30 miles (48 km) east from the city and county town of Lincoln, 4 miles (6.4 km) south-east from the nearest market town of Spilsby, and 7 miles (11 km) inland from the holiday resort town of Skegness.

The village lies on the northern side of the waterway today known as the Steeping River, which is the lower element of the River Lymn that sources in the Lincolnshire Wolds. Firsby was once the location of one of the busiest railway stations on the East Coast of England.

The 2001 census recorded a village population of 276, increasing slightly at the 2011 census to 278.

== History ==
=== Early history ===
Historically, Firsby belonged to the Wold division of the Wapentake of Candleshoe and was in a part of ancient Lindsey.

In his History of the County of Lincolnshire written in 1834, historian Thomas Allen records that "Firsby is an obscure place on the north side of the River Limb _{(sic)} between Wainfleet and Spilsby, being five miles distant from each".

Allen further comments that "Firsby's St Andrew's Church is an ancient crumbling edifice in a state of great decay. The single aisled church is thatched and in front of the porch is a bare pillar of stone that may have at one time held a sundial". Before the Reformation the church belonged to the Abbey at Bardney and was presented to the village by the Norman Lord of the Manor Sir Gilbert de Gaunt (1048-1094). The rectory was valued in 1834 at £12 0s 7d (£12.03). The original Norman church was demolished and a new church building erected in 1856 on the same site.

There were once two public houses in the village although both are closed. One of the public houses had its own brewery, and the other serviced the railway and doubled as the Railway Hotel. There are other records that mention a third drinking establishment around 1852, Whyley's Beerhouse, that stood adjacent to Firsby railway station. The local beer houses were introduced by the 1830 Beer Act which permitted anybody to open a licensed beer and cider house in their front room for a licence fee of two guineas, but they were not permitted to sell spirits or fortified wines. Many beer houses went on to develop as full public houses to sell a range of drinks, and still exist; by 1885 those that hadn't become pubs had died out.

At the beginning of the 20th century the village had a football team, which played its fixtures on a field behind the Railway Hotel, with a clubhouse and changing rooms next to the field. A previous village hall was situated beside the main Spilsby to Wainfleet road.

=== Railway connections ===
The railway station at Firsby opened in 1848 and was a substantial structure for a country station, totally unlike the majority of small isolated rural halts. The station had three platforms each two hundred metres long, with buildings, booking offices, male, female and general waiting rooms, restaurants, toilets, baggage and goods halls, crew rooms, staff canteen and numerous railway offices. The main line tracks were crossed by a substantial passenger footbridge and most of the station was covered by an ornate cast-iron and glass canopy. The station also had signal boxes, water towers, goods sidings and engine repair sheds.

Firsby was a junction for the Skegness line and the Spilsby line on their short branches from the main GNR London to Cleethorpes railway. During the summer months holiday passenger traffic, from throughout the country alighting at Firsby for the connection to Skegness, was substantial with hundreds and sometimes thousands of passengers passing through the station at a weekend. In the Victorian era most holidaymakers travelled by train and Firsby was one of the busiest stations on the East Lincolnshire Railway. The station was the major employer in the area and between the station master and his assistants, ticket office staffs, ticket inspectors, signalmen, porters, catering staffs, drivers, firemen, guards and track maintenance staff for three separate railway companies, several hundred people worked at, or from, Firsby station on a daily basis.

Between 1943 and 1958 Firsby station was kept busy as the nearest railhead staging point for RAF and later USAF airmen travelling to and from the nearby RAF Spilsby airfield at Great Steeping.

The line was closed down in 1970 due to the Beeching cuts, and the majority of the station and the platforms were demolished. Only the most southerly section of the station building remains and is now a private residence. With the old east coast main line between Firsby and Cleethorpes removed a new direct link to Skegness was installed at the junction a few hundred metres south from the old Firsby station. A common call at the station was "Over the bridge for Skegness"as was "Boston, Spalding, Peterborough, London" for the twice daily express train to King's Cross.n

=== Firsby to Spilsby Railway ===
A small local railway company built a branch line from Firsby junction to Spilsby, which it opened on 1 May 1868. The branch was just over 4 miles (6.4 km) long and connected Spilsby to the King's Cross, London to Cleethorpes main line. The only other railway station on the branch line was Halton Holegate Halt. Necessary parliamentary permission was obtained by an Act in July 1865 which incorporated The Spilsby & Firsby Railway Company with an authorised capital of £20,000 and loans of £8,333 for the construction of the four-mile-long single-track branch.

Construction of the railway began in March 1867, with the ceremonial cutting of the first turf performed by local rector, the Reverend Rawnsley, who was standing in for the railway company's chairman Lord Willoughby de Eresby. The railway was expected to be opened quickly but disputes with the contractors arose over the quality of their work and several lengths of track had to be replaced. With these problems finally fixed, the official opening took place. Initial traffic levels and income were promising, however by 1885 rail traffic had slumped leading to the Great Northern Railway buying out the Spilsby & Firsby Railway Company for £20,000 through an Act of Parliament on 25 July 1890.

In 1920, there was a major accident when the Spilsby engine was derailed and passengers had to be transported by road. When the locomotive was returned to the tracks it managed to reach Firsby in a record eight and a half minutes instead of the normal thirteen minutes. A few days later, the train ran into the buffers of another stationary train at Firsby and several passengers were badly shaken. A 71-year-old local businessman, Mr. Welch, died the following day from the delayed effects of the accident.

Falling usage caused passenger services to be suspended in 1939, just as the Second World War began, and they were never reinstated. A goods train service for grain, potatoes, livestock and other agricultural products continued through Firsby for almost another twenty years. Goods including petrol, paraffin and coal continued into Spilsby via the rail link until its closure on 30 November 1958. The Spilsby station building has been demolished, but other buildings still stand and in recent years have been used by an agricultural suppliers as a shop and store, with new sections added. Between Firsby and Spilsby, most of the old track route can still be seen in aerial photographs, marked by the avenue of trees and bushes, with only 5% ploughed out into fields.

== Governance ==
=== Parish ===
Firsby is governed by the Firsby group Parish Council that covers the villages of Bratoft, Firsby, Great Steeping, Irby in the Marsh, and Little Steeping. The current (2013) chairman is Richard Kidd of Irby in the Marsh, and the vice chairman, Robert Heane of Great Steeping.

=== District ===
Firsby falls within East Lindsey District Council and in 2013 is represented by Pauline Cooper (Conservative).

=== County Council ===
Firsby's 2013 county councillor to Lincoln County Council is Neil Cooper (Conservative)

=== Westminster ===
Firsby falls within the Louth and Horncastle constituency.

== Geography ==
Firsby stands on the northern side of the River Steeping waterway, which is the lower part of the River Lymn, and to the east of the Lincolnshire Wolds on a tract of flat fenland, bounded by Boston Deeps and the North Sea. It is within 8 miles (12.9 km) inland by road from the holiday centre of Skegness on the Lincolnshire coast.

The Wolds comprise a series of low hills and steep valleys underlain by calcareous chalk, green limestone and sandstone rock, laid down in the Cretaceous period under a shallow warm sea. The characteristic open valleys of the Wolds were created during the last ice age through the action of glaciation and meltwater. Geographically, the Lincolnshire Wolds are a continuation of the Yorkshire Wolds which run through the East Riding of Yorkshire, the Wolds as a whole having been bisected by the erosive power of the waters of the Humber.

The fenlands, which stretch down as far as Norfolk, are former wetlands consisting both of peat bogs and tidal silt marshes that were virtually all drained by the end of the 19th century, when Firsby had its longest period of growth. The former peat fens and silt marshes provided a rich loamy soil that was ideal for the growing of cereal and vegetable crops, and gave Lincolnshire its reputation as being the "bread basket" of England. The resulting flat lands also made an ideal environment for the later mechanisation of farming in the mid-20th century. Firsby has always been an agriculturally based village with a dark and rich loamy soil over a heavy clay subsoil.

== Demography ==
The population in 1834 was recorded as 142. By 1921, that had risen to 231 and the population figure has remained reasonably constant ever since.

The 2001 census recorded the following information for Firsby:

Population: 276

52.5% male and 47.5% female. Average age 39.8

18.4% are single and never married, 64.2% married with the remainder split between separated, divorced or widowed.

98.9% are white and 1.1% of mixed race.

83% declared a Christian religion, 1.1% Buddhist and 15.9% stated no religion.

57% are employed, 18.7% retired, 2.6% unemployed and the remainder are disabled, full-time carers or students.

== Education ==
There are no schools in the village. School bus transport is provided by Lincolnshire Education Authority.

Most primary school children attend Great Steeping Primary School, a mixed-sex rural primary school that has approximately 115 pupils, of whom 67 are boys and 48 girls.

Secondary school age pupils can attend:

- King Edward VI Academy in Spilsby, a coeducational bi-lateral secondary school, sixth form college and specialist Humanities College for children between the ages of eleven and eighteen.
- St Clement's College (formerly known as the Earl of Scarborough High School), a secondary modern on Burgh Le Marsh Road, Skegness.
- Skegness Grammar School on Vernon Road, Skegness.

== Religious sites ==
Firsby Grade II listed Anglican church is dedicated to St Andrew. It is constructed of limestone ashlar, and was rebuilt in 1856 by architect George Edmund Street at a cost of £850.

Firsby Methodist Church, a Wesleyan chapel built in 1838, is on Fendyke Road. The village hall was built in 1922.

== Notable people ==
- Bishop Warburton, rector of Firsby-cum-Steeping Magna (1730–1756).

== See also ==
- Photo of St Andrews Church
- Firsby Walks
