= Coningsby =

Town and civil parish in the East Lindsey district in Lincolnshire, England

Coordinates: 53.1051°N 0.1752°W

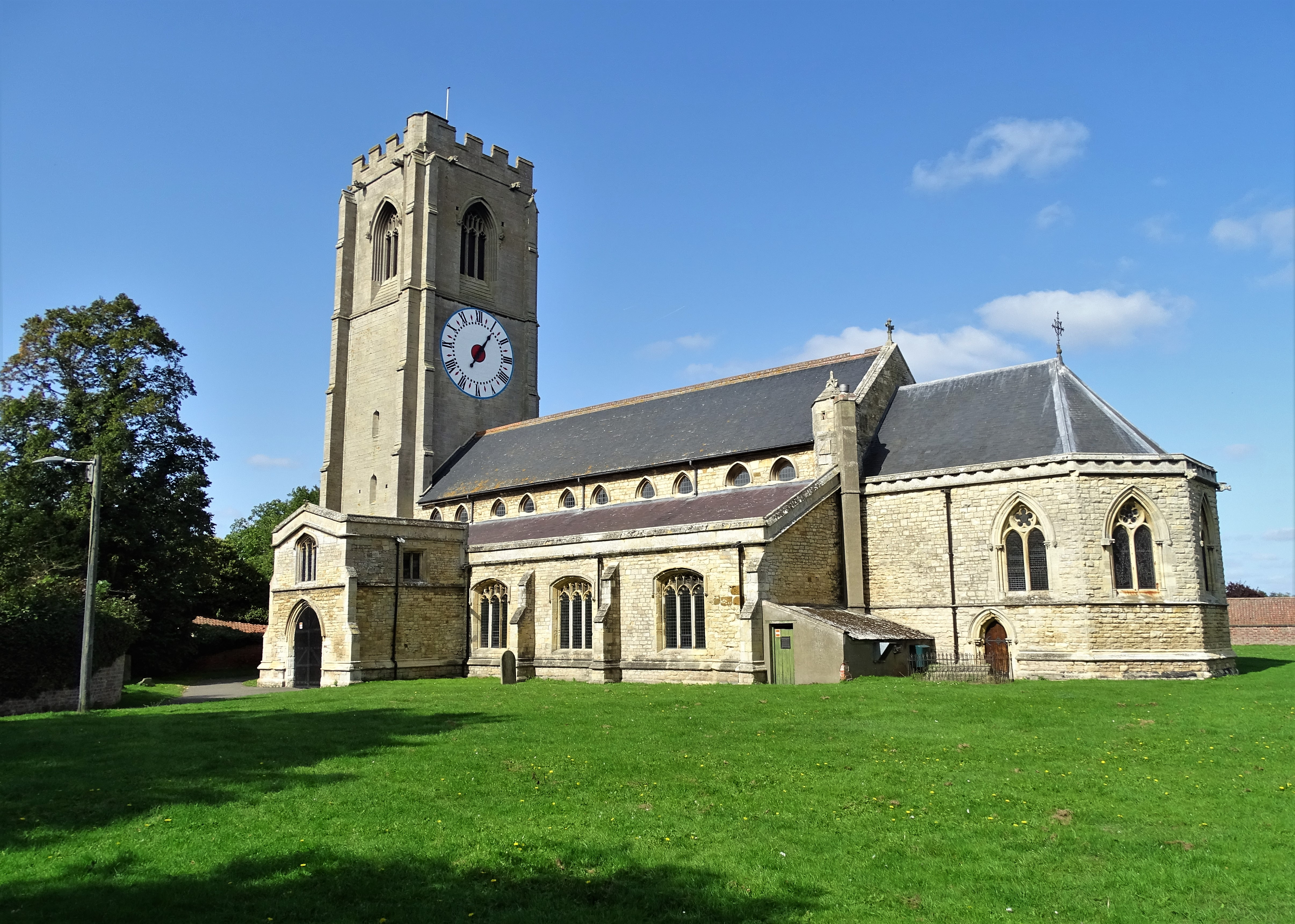
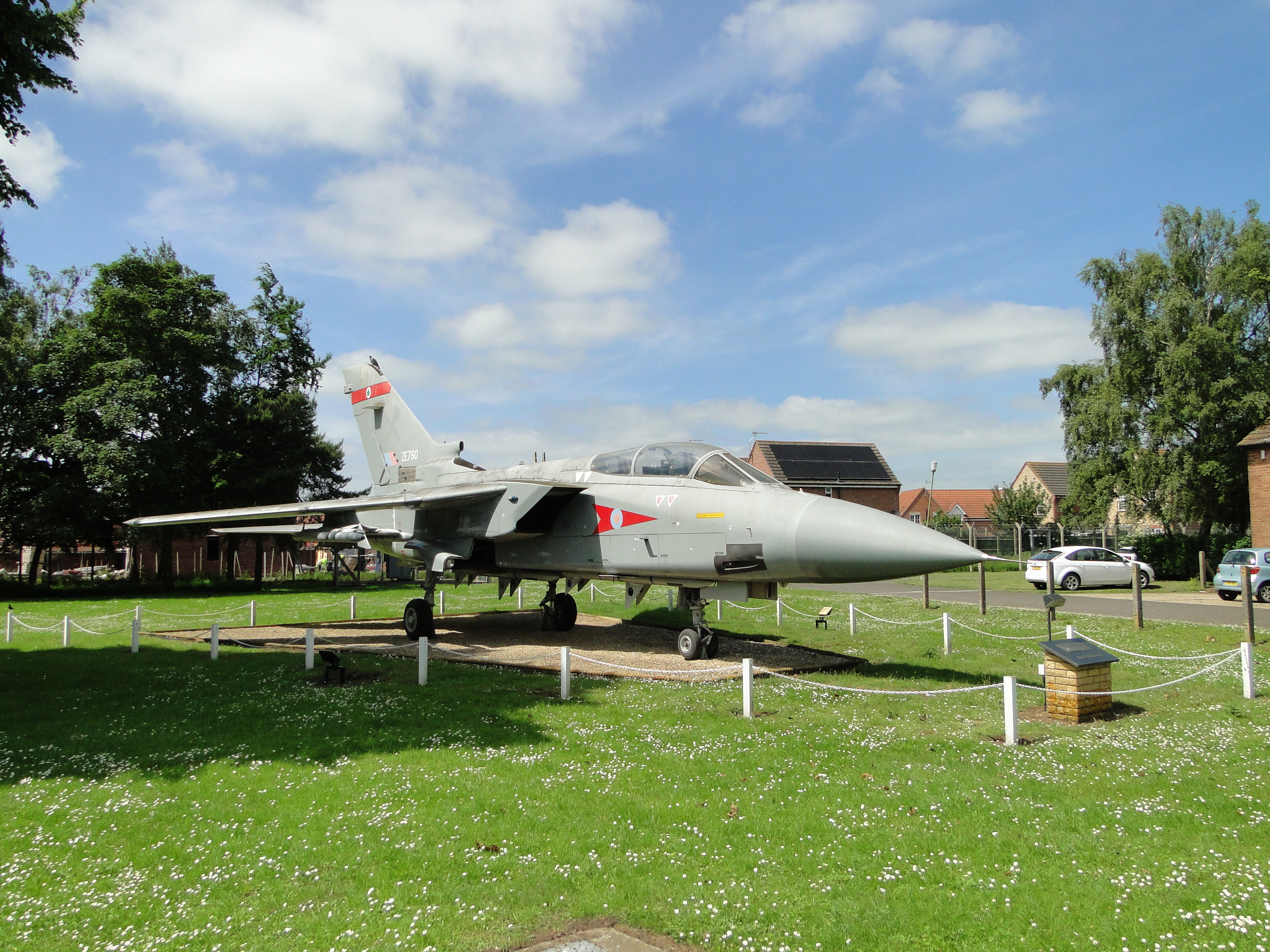
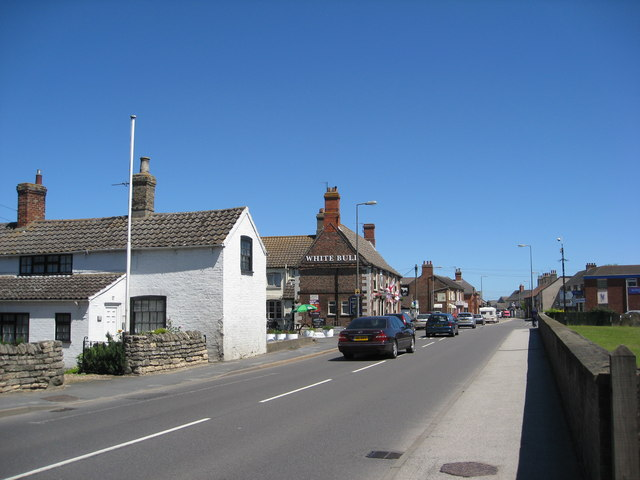
- St Michael and All Saints Church RAF Coningsby High Street

- Location within Lincolnshire
- Area: 14.67 km^{2} (5.66 sq mi)
- Population: 3,864
  - Density: 263/km^{2} (680/sq mi)
- OS grid reference: TF2258
  - London: 110 mi (180 km) S
- Civil parish: Coningsby
- District: East Lindsey
- Shire county: Lincolnshire
- Region: East Midlands
- Country: England
- Sovereign state: United Kingdom
- Post town: LINCOLN
- Postcode district: LN4
- Dialling code: 01526
- Police: Lincolnshire
- Fire: Lincolnshire
- Ambulance: East Midlands
- UK Parliament: Louth and Horncastle

Coningsby /ˈkʌnɪŋzbɪ/ is a town and civil parish in the East Lindsey district in Lincolnshire, England, it is situated on the A153 road, adjoining Tattershall on its western side, 13 miles (21 km) north west of Boston and 8 miles (13 km) south west from Horncastle.

== Governance ==
Coningsby is the most populous parish in the electoral ward of Coningsby and Tattershall. The population of this ward taken at the 2011 Census was 6,943.

== Geography ==
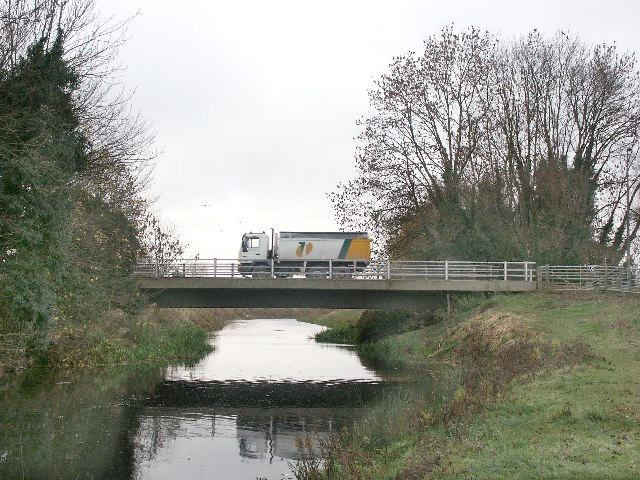
Bridge over the River Bain

The town takes its name from the Old Norse konungr meaning "King" and the Old Norse noun by meaning "settlement", which gives "settlement of the King". Coningsby is about 7 miles (11 km) south of Horncastle on the A153 Horncastle to Sleaford road, with the Lincolnshire Wolds to the east and the Fens to the west. The B1192 Kirton to Woodhall Spa road passes through the town. At the town's western end it is separated from the village of Tattershall by the River Bain.

The Kirkstead and Little Steeping Railway passing through the town opened on 1 July 1913 but closed on 5 July 1970. The former Coningsby railway station has been demolished and nothing remains except for the station master's house.

=== Climate ===
A temperature of 40.3 °C (104.5 °F), which is the highest temperature ever recorded in the UK, occurred on 19 July 2022 at Coningsby. The lowest temperature recorded since 1978 was −13.3 °C (8.1 °F) on 11 February 2012.

Climate data for RAF Coningsby, 6 m (20 ft) amsl, 1991–2020 normals, extremes 1978–present
Month	Jan	Feb	Mar	Apr	May	Jun	Jul	Aug	Sep	Oct	Nov	Dec	Year
Record high °C (°F)	15.2 (59.4)	18.3 (64.9)	23.1 (73.6)	26.4 (79.5)	32.6 (90.7)	36.9 (98.4)	40.3 (104.5)	34.6 (94.3)	30.9 (87.6)	29.3 (84.7)	18.4 (65.1)	15.9 (60.6)	40.3 (104.5)
Mean daily maximum °C (°F)	7.3 (45.1)	8.1 (46.6)	10.7 (51.3)	13.6 (56.5)	16.8 (62.2)	19.6 (67.3)	22.2 (72.0)	22.1 (71.8)	19.0 (66.2)	14.7 (58.5)	10.3 (50.5)	7.5 (45.5)	14.4 (57.9)
Daily mean °C (°F)	4.3 (39.7)	4.7 (40.5)	6.7 (44.1)	9.1 (48.4)	12.2 (54.0)	15.0 (59.0)	17.3 (63.1)	17.2 (63.0)	14.6 (58.3)	11.0 (51.8)	7.1 (44.8)	4.5 (40.1)	10.3 (50.5)
Mean daily minimum °C (°F)	1.2 (34.2)	1.3 (34.3)	2.7 (36.9)	4.7 (40.5)	7.5 (45.5)	10.4 (50.7)	12.4 (54.3)	12.3 (54.1)	10.2 (50.4)	7.4 (45.3)	3.8 (38.8)	1.5 (34.7)	6.3 (43.3)
Record low °C (°F)	−13.2 (8.2)	−13.3 (8.1)	−6.3 (20.7)	−4.4 (24.1)	−2.1 (28.2)	1.5 (34.7)	4.5 (40.1)	4.3 (39.7)	0.7 (33.3)	−4.2 (24.4)	−10.6 (12.9)	−12.1 (10.2)	−13.3 (8.1)
Average precipitation mm (inches)	47.6 (1.87)	37.8 (1.49)	34.8 (1.37)	40.2 (1.58)	45.8 (1.80)	57.0 (2.24)	54.8 (2.16)	58.7 (2.31)	51.4 (2.02)	59.5 (2.34)	56.0 (2.20)	50.4 (1.98)	594.1 (23.39)
Average precipitation days (≥ 1.0 mm)	10.2	9.3	8.2	8.3	8.5	9.3	9.2	9.2	8.3	9.9	11.6	11.0	112.9
Source 1: Met Office
Source 2: Starlings Roost Weather

== Education ==
Coningsby St Michael's C of E Primary School is on School Lane. The secondary school is Barnes Wallis Academy, the Gartree Community School, is just outside the Coningsby boundary in Tattershall, near the A153. Queen Elizabeth's Grammar School provides sixth form education to pupils graduating from Gartree and other secondary modern schools. RAF Coningsby Nursery and Kids Club provides childcare for military personnel and the community.

The nearest further education college is in Boston. In late March 2008, renovation of the Tattershall/Coningsby Library included a small learning centre provided by Boston College.

== Media ==
Local news and television programmes are provided by BBC Yorkshire and Lincolnshire and ITV Yorkshire. Television signals are received from the Belmont TV transmitter, BBC East Midlands and ITV Central can also be received from the Waltham TV transmitter.

Local radio stations are BBC Radio Lincolnshire on 94.9 FM, Greatest Hits Radio Lincolnshire on 102.2 FM, and Hits Radio Lincolnshire which broadcasts on DAB.

Lincolnshire Echo is the town's local newspaper.

== Parish church ==
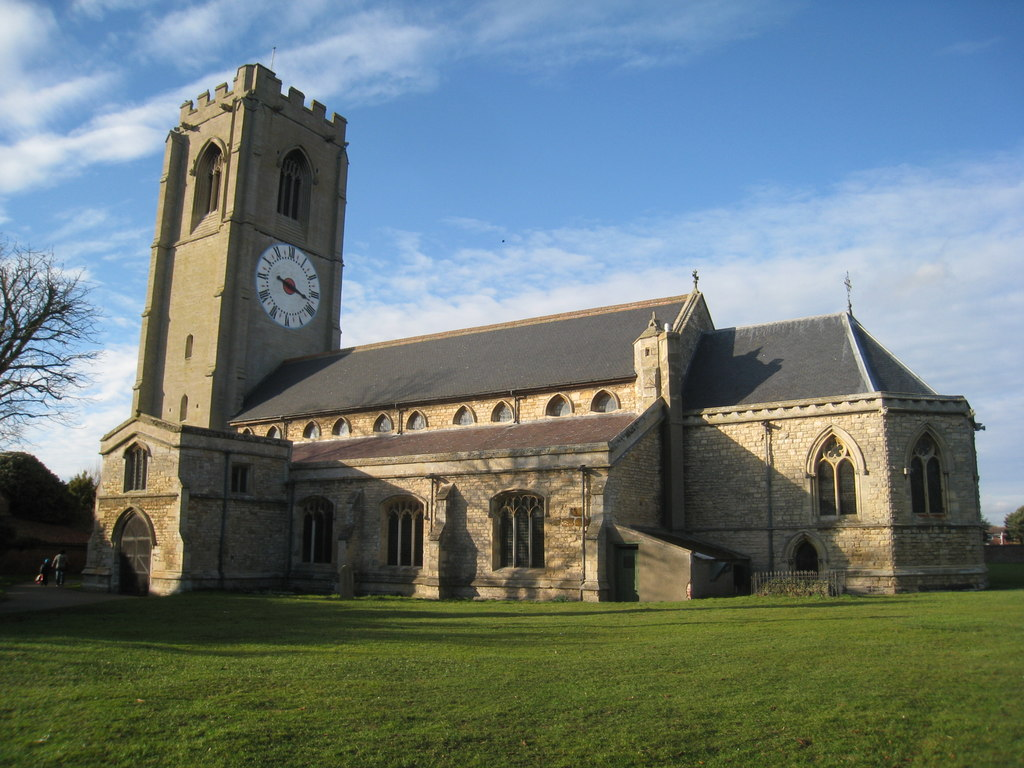
Church of St Michael and All Angels

Coningsby is overlooked by the tower of its 15th-century parish church, St Michael's, with its one-handed clock face. The face is painted directly onto the wall of the tower and was probably installed in the 17th century. It is 16 1/2 feet (5.0 metres) in diameter and its hand is nearly 9 feet (2.7 metres) long. The driving weights are large stones and its pendulum swings once every two seconds. The pendulum is not attached to the clock but some distance away, linked by a connecting rod. There are three wheels in the timekeeping mechanism, which needs winding once a day. The tower on which the clock face is painted is on the outside of the building. There is an arched passage under the tower which is part of a public footpath from the A153 High Street to the school in School Lane, through the churchyard.

There is also a canonical sundial, dating from the 12th century, on the south wall of the church.

In 1730, Britain's youngest Poet Laureate, Laurence Eusden who was appointed aged thirty, was buried in the church where he had been Rector. Two decades later another poet, John Dyer, was appointed as Rector and while living in the village completed his poem "The Fleece". He died there of consumption (tuberculosis) in 1757, and was buried without memorial in the church chancel. England international footballer Beaumont Jarrett was curate there from 1878 to 1882.

== Amenities ==
Public houses include the Black Swan, The Castle Inn and the White Bull, which are all on High Street, and the Lea Gate Inn on Leagate Road (B1192).

== RAF Coningsby ==
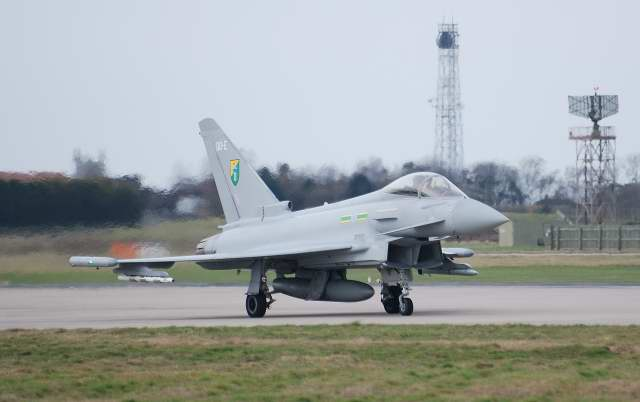
A Typhoon fighter jet of No.3 Squadron takes off in February 2008

Half a mile (1 km) to the south of the town is RAF Coningsby, one of the Royal Air Force's most important stations, home of No. 3 Squadron, No. XI Squadron, No. 12 Squadron, No. 29 Squadron and No.41 (R) Squadron

The airfield houses part of Britain's heritage, the Battle of Britain Memorial Flight formed in 1957 to commemorate the Royal Air Force's major battle honours, with a Lancaster, five Spitfires, two Hurricanes and a Dakota. These aircraft still fly and can be seen at air shows during summer, as well as at events of national importance or RAF significance.

From 1950 until 1953 RAF Coningsby was home to three squadrons of Washingtons, the RAF name for the Boeing B-29 Superfortress and for the first 18 months these were maintained by National Service technicians whose conscription was extended to 24 months because of their particular skills.

== Economy ==
Pellcroft Engineering Ltd, in Coningsby, is a company selling agricultural fans.
