= Firsby railway station =

Former railway station in Lincolnshire, England

Coordinates: 53.15339°N 0.17950°E

Firsby
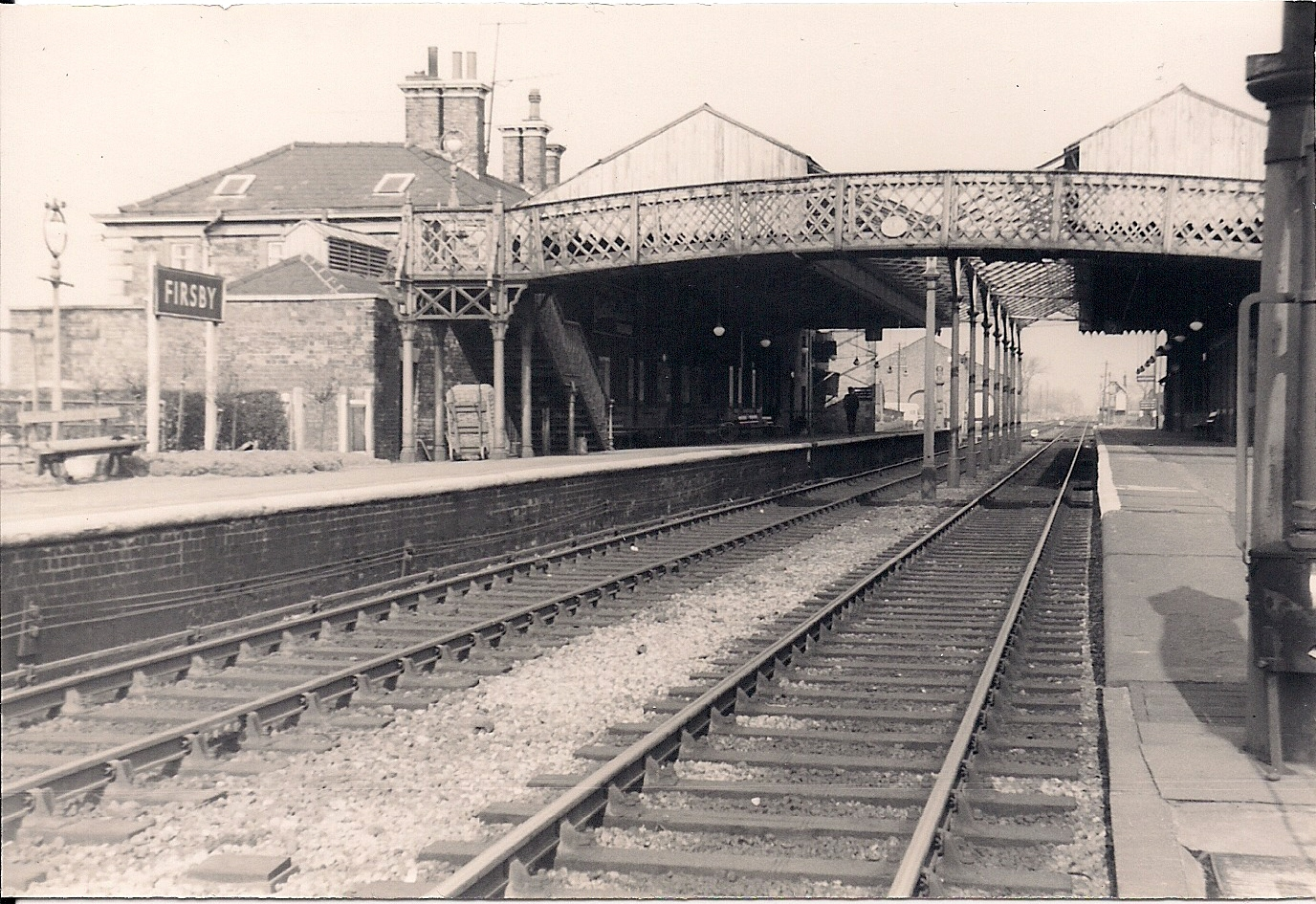
- Firsby station in 1968

General information
- Location: Firsby, Lincolnshire; England
- Platforms: 3

Other information
- Status: Disused

History
- Original company: East Lincolnshire Railway
- Pre-grouping: Great Northern Railway
- Post-grouping: London and North Eastern Railway; Eastern Region of British Railways

Key dates
- 3 Sep 1848: Opened
- 1 May 1868: Spilsby and Firsby Railway Company formed
- 30 Nov 1958: Spilsby branch line closed
- 5 Oct 1970: Station and line closed
Location

Firsby railway station was a station in Firsby, Lincolnshire. It served as a main line station and a terminus for two branch lines to Skegness and Spilsby respectively. The station was popular in the 19th and early 20th centuries for seaside connections to Skegness, but was recommended for closure in the Beeching Report and closed in 1970. The station was mostly demolished.

== Opening ==
The station, originally named Firstby, opened on 3 September 1848, and attracted a regular goods service from Louth. Unlike many isolated rural halts, it had a substantial structure. The station had three platforms each two hundred and twenty yards long and covered with buildings, booking offices, several waiting rooms (male, female and general), restaurants, toilets, baggage and goods halls, crew rooms, staff canteen and housing, and several railway offices. The main line tracks were crossed by a passenger footbridge and most of the station was covered by an ornate cast-iron and glass canopy normally only seen at main city stations. The station also had signal boxes, water towers, extensive goods sidings, and engine repair sheds.

The station was served by two public houses, one of which doubled as the Firsby Railway Hotel. There are several mentions in old records of a second drinking establishment around 1852, called Whyley's Beerhouse, that stood adjacent to Firsby railway station.

By the 1860s, the station was serving four trains a day to Grimsby, three a day to Boston, and two a day to Louth.

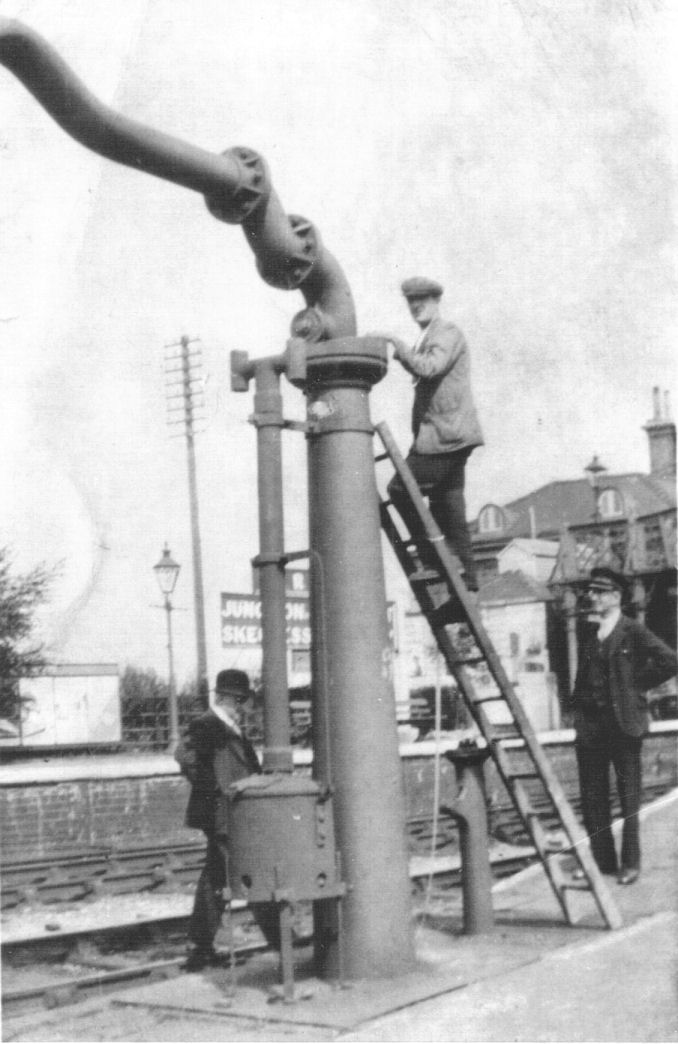
Firsby Junction in the 1930s

== Branch lines ==
Firsby was a junction for the Skegness line and the Spilsby line on their short branches from the main Great Northern Railway's London Kings Cross to Cleethorpes East Coast Main Line railway. The branch to Skegness opened as far as Wainfleet on 24 October 1871, then to Skegness on 28 July 1873. The connection to Spilsby opened on 1 May 1868.

Traffic peaked at the station during the summer months, where holiday passenger traffic stopped for a connection to Skegness. This led to overcrowding at the station, but was also a significant source of employment.

Traffic at the station peaked in the early 1920s, mostly excursion trains to Skegness.

Between 1943 and 1958 Firsby was used as a nearby staging point for RAF and later USAF airmen travelling to and from RAF Spilsby at Great Steeping.

== Closure ==
The connection to Spilsby closed on 10 September 1939.

The station was recommended for closure to passengers in the 1963 Beeching Report and did so on 4 October 1970. The link to Skegness was also scheduled for closure, but the branch to the south of the station was retained, as was the line from there to Boston. After closing the station was mostly demolished the following year.

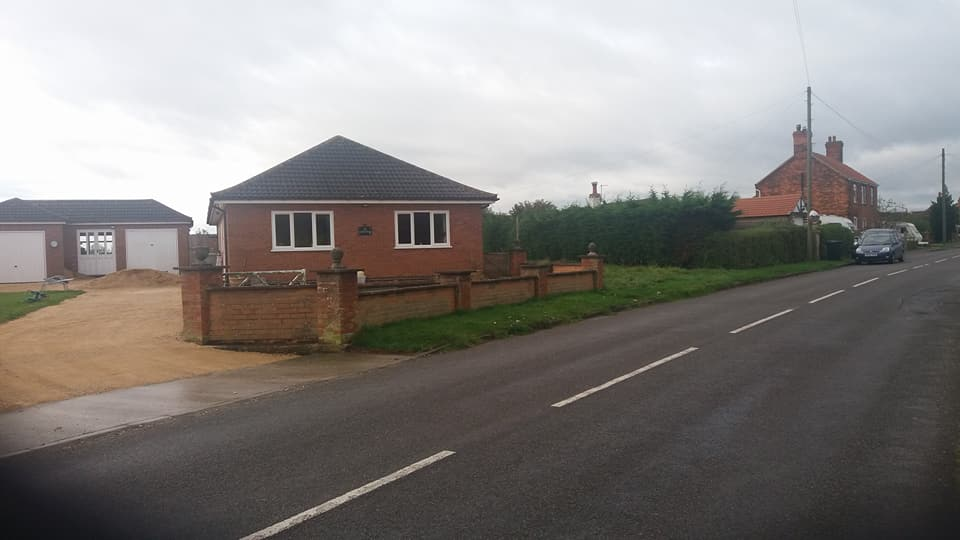
The former level crossing looking towards Little Steeping

Only the most southerly section of the station building remains and is now a private residence. With the old East Coast Main Line between Firsby and Grimsby removed, a new direct link to Skegness was used at the junction a few hundred yards south of the old Firsby station. Although the station is long gone many locals still remember the station master calling out "Skegness passengers, Over the bridge for Skegness!"

A small part of the former junction remains but is partially built on by a small house partially angled onto the trackbed. The trackbed from Firsby to Spilsby can still be followed albeit on private land.

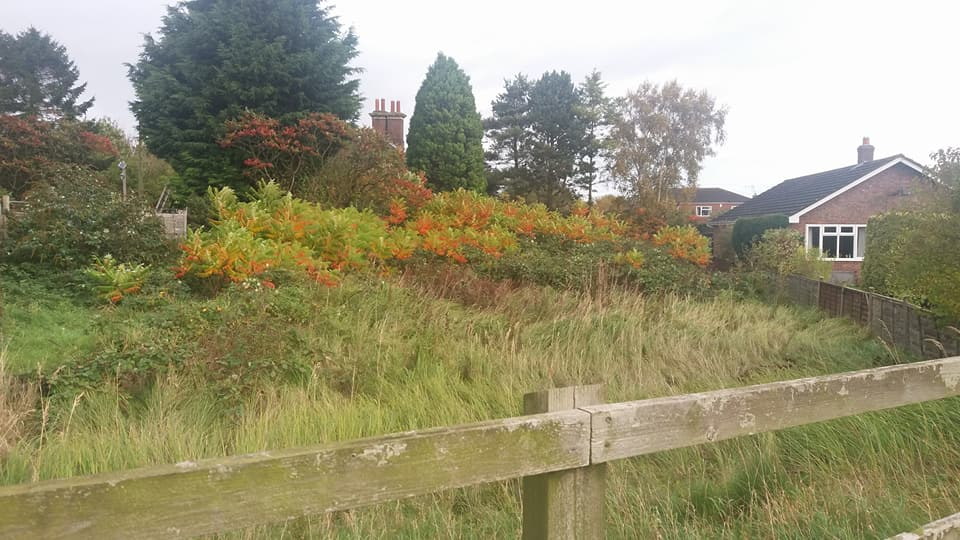
The site of the station

== Former services ==
Preceding station	Disused railways	Following station
Little Steeping	Great Northern Railway; East Lincolnshire Line	Burgh Le Marsh
Little Steeping	Great Northern Railway; Kirkstead and Little Steeping Railway	Terminus
Halton Holegate	Great Northern Railway; Spilsby branch	Terminus
Thorpe Culvert	Great Northern Railway; Firsby to Skegness railway branch line	Terminus
