= Spilsby branch =

#Mister_Jan

The Spilsby branch was a railway line built in Lincolnshire, England by the Spilsby and Firsby Railway. It was made to connect the market town of Spilsby with the main line network. It opened in 1868, and was worked by the Great Northern Railway.

The Company was never financially successful, and its proprietors sold it to the Great Northern Railway in 1891. The passenger service was withdrawn as an economy measure on the outbreak of World War II in 1939 and never reinstated, and the line closed completely in 1958.

== Beginning ==
Spilsby and Firsby Railway Act 1865
- Act of Parliament
- Parliament of the United Kingdom
- Long title: An Act for making a Railway, to be called "The Spilsby and Firsby Railway;" and for other Purposes.
- Citation: 28 & 29 Vict. c. ccxxxviii

Dates
- Royal assent: 5 July 1865

Text of statute as originally enacted

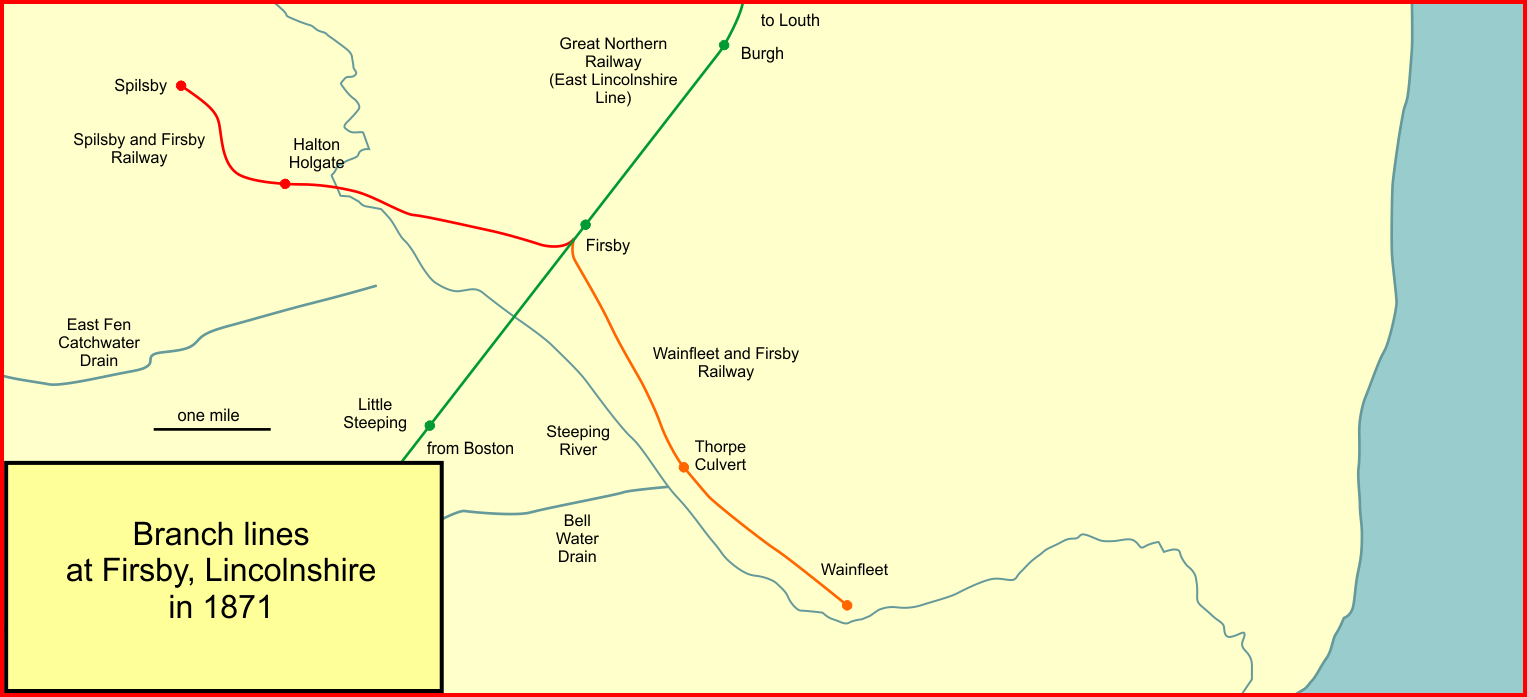
The Spilsby branch in 1871

In the early decades of the nineteenth century, Spilsby was a thriving market town. However when the Great Northern Railway opened the East Lincolnshire Line, the line passed some distance from Spilsby. Towns that were directly served by the new railways developed commercially, and Spilsby declined. A meeting at Spilsby in 1864 agreed that a branch line was the solution, and on 5 July 1865 the Spilsby and Firsby Railway Company was authorised by the Spilsby and Firsby Railway Act 1865 (28 & 29 Vict. c. ccxxxviii).

- A Railway commencing by a Junction with the East Lincolnshire Railway at or near Fifteen Chains (or thereabouts) South of the Firsby Station of that Railway in the Parish of Firsby in the County of Lincoln, Parts of Lindsey, and terminating in a Field in the Parish of Spilsby in the said County of Lincoln belonging to the Right Honourable Lord Willoughby D'Eresby, in the Occupation of West John Rainey, and which said intended Railway and Works will be made or pass from, in, through, or into the several Parishes, Townships, Townlands, extra-parochial and other Places following, or some of them; (that is to say,) Firsby, Great Steeping, Halton Holegate, Toynton, St. Peter's, and Spilsby, all in the said County of Lincoln, Parts of Lindsey.
— Section 24, Spilsby and Firsby Railway Act 1865 (28 & 29 Vict. c. ccxxxviii)

The new company had difficulty in raising its £25,000 authorised share capital, and the building of the short line of 4 miles and 14 chains was delayed. The line opened on 1 May 1868; there was one intermediate station at Halton Holgate. (Note: Some sources, including current Ordnance Survey maps, spell the village Halton Holegate, but the railway usage was Halton Holgate.) The Great Northern Railway worked the line for 40% of receipts. The train service was seven trains each way daily; when the Skegness line opened, there was a Sunday service in summer.

The track had been very lightly laid, and had to be renewed (with second hand materials) in 1880.

== Operation ==
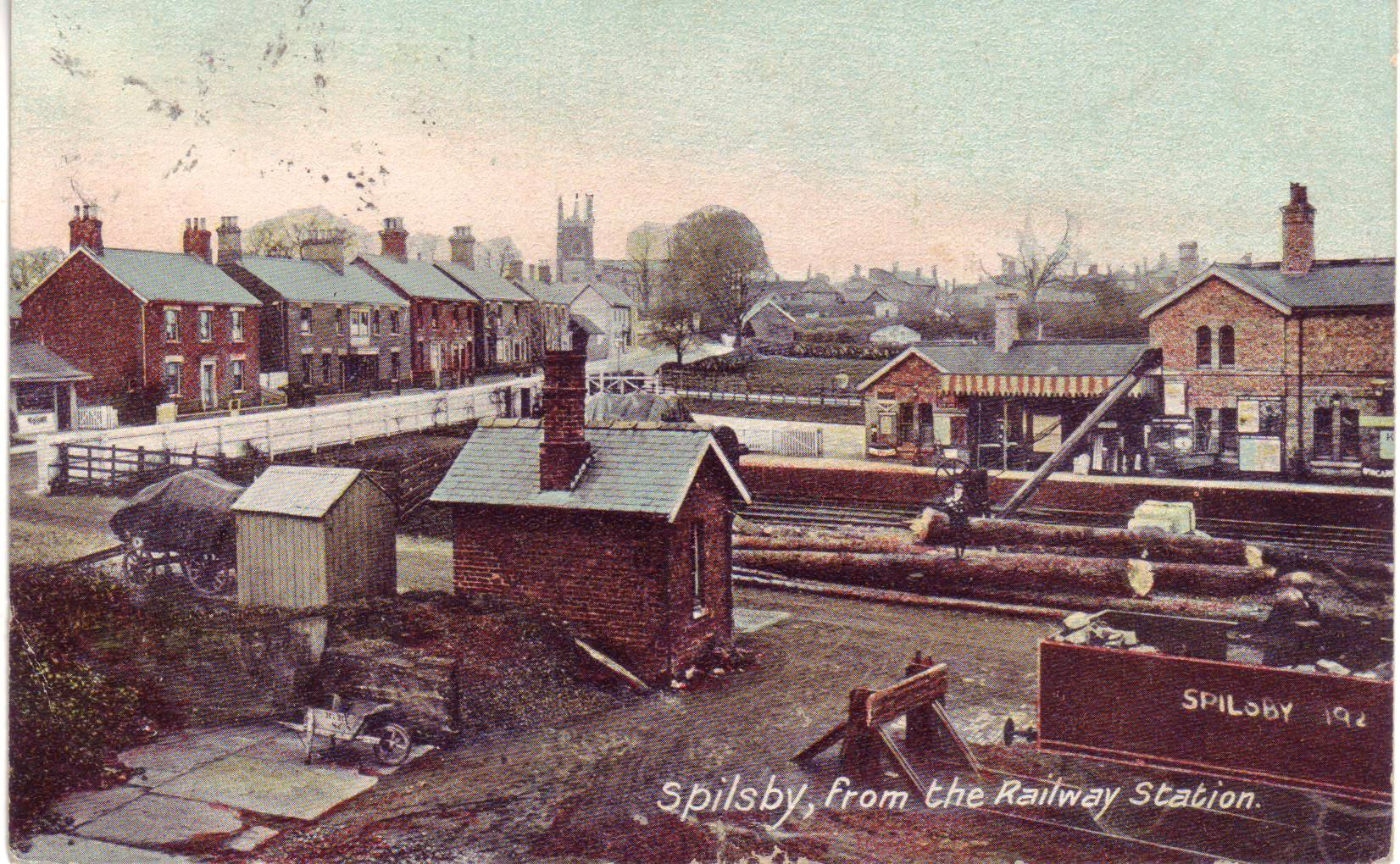
Spilsby railway station

The Great Northern Railway had to provide direct financial support of £250 annually to keep the line going, but the agricultural depression of the 1880s pushed the line under, and there remained no option but to sell to the GNR; this took effect on 1 January 1891, by the Great Northern Railway (Various Powers) Act 1890 (53 & 54 Vict. c. civ) of 25 July 1890; the purchase price was £28,000. (Note: £20,000 in cash and adoption of £8,333 in debentures.) The line was generally level, but the last three-quarters of a mile to Spilsby climbed at 1 in 66, placing a limitation on the loading of locomotives.

A steam railmotor was tried on the branch in the 1930s, but was unsuccessful.

== Closure ==
On 10 September 1939 the passenger service on the line was suspended as a war economy. The branch closed completely after the passage of the last train on 30 November 1958; the bridge over the Steeping River would have needed reconstruction, and the income on the line could hardly bear the cost.

== Location list ==
- Firsby; main line station;
- Halton Holgate; opened 1 May 1868; closed 11 September 1939;
- Spilsby; opened 1 May 1868; closed 11 September 1939.

== See also ==
Lincolnshire lines of the Great Northern Railway
