= Howsham =

Howsham may refer to:

- Howsham, Lincolnshire, England
- Howsham, North Yorkshire, England
