= Thornton le Moor =

Thornton le Moor may refer to multiple English villages:

- Thornton le Moor, Lincolnshire
- Thornton-le-Moor, North Yorkshire

== See also ==
- Thornton-le-Moors for the similarly named Cheshire village
