= Southorpe (disambiguation) =

Southorpe is a civil parish in the city of Peterborough, Cambridgeshire, England. Southorpe may also refer to:

- Southorpe, Lincolnshire
- Southorpe, East Riding of Yorkshire, deserted medieval village
