= Bleasby =

Bleasby may refer to:

- Bleasby, Nottinghamshire, England
- Bleasby, Lincolnshire, England
