= Acthorpe =

Hamlet in the East Lindsey district of Lincolnshire, England

Coordinates: 53.384418°N 0.033045°W

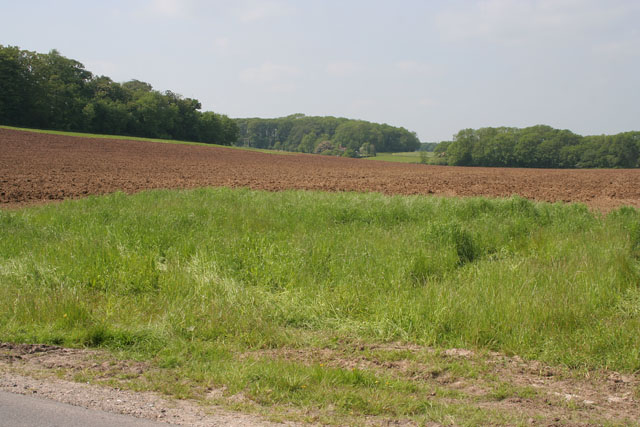
- Acthorpe Wood

- Location within Lincolnshire
- OS grid reference: TF309893
  - London: 135 mi (217 km) S
- Civil parish: Elkington
- District: East Lindsey
- Shire county: Lincolnshire
- Region: East Midlands
- Country: England
- Sovereign state: United Kingdom
- Post town: Louth
- Postcode district: LN11
- Police: Lincolnshire
- Fire: Lincolnshire
- Ambulance: East Midlands
- UK Parliament: Louth and Horncastle

Acthorpe is a hamlet in the East Lindsey district of Lincolnshire, England. It is approximately 2 miles (3 km) north-west from the town of Louth, and in the Lincolnshire Wolds, a designated Area of Outstanding Natural Beauty. Acthorpe is part of the civil parish of Elkington.

Acthorpe does not appear in the Domesday Book and is considered a deserted medieval village.

Acthorpe Farm House is a Grade II listed building of red brick, dating from 1740, with nineteenth- and twentieth-century alterations.

Acthorpe Wood is an area of semi-natural ancient woodland.
