= Asperton =

Hamlet in Lincolnshire, England

Coordinates: 52.91°N 00.12°W

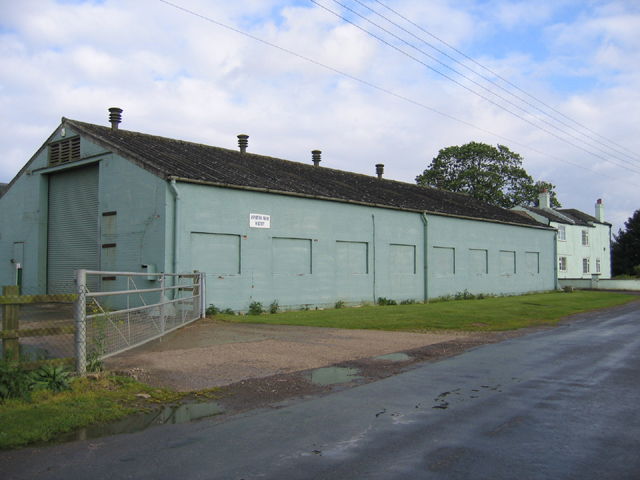
- Asperton Farm, Asperton

- Location within Lincolnshire
- OS grid reference: TF2637
- Shire county: Lincolnshire
- Region: East Midlands
- Country: England
- Sovereign state: United Kingdom
- Post town: Boston
- Postcode district: PE20
- Dialling code: 01205
- Police: Lincolnshire
- Fire: Lincolnshire
- Ambulance: East Midlands

Asperton is a tiny hamlet in the civil parish of Wigtoft, located in the Borough of Boston in Lincolnshire, England.

Asperton consists of a single road and is situated a mile North of Wigtoft.
