= Carlton Castle =

Castle Hill
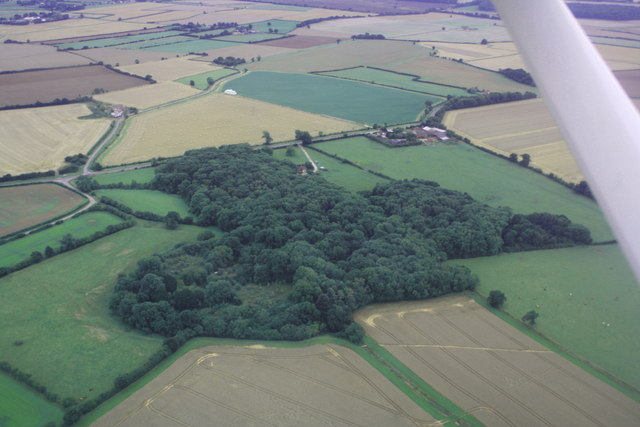
- Site of motte and bailey
- Type: Motte and bailey castle
- Location: Castle Carlton, Lincolnshire, England
- Coordinates: 53.33093°N 0.09333°E
- Built: 12th century
- Built by: Hugh Bardolf

Castle Hill is the name given to the once substantial motte and bailey, perhaps double bailey, apparently associated with the then new town of Castle Carlton in the county of Lincolnshire, some 7 miles south-east of Louth, between the villages of North and South Reston (grid reference TF395836).

It was founded in the 12th century by Hugh Bardolf.
