= Cadney cum Howsham =

Former civil parish in Lincolnshire, England

Coordinates: 53.523811°N 0.422640°W

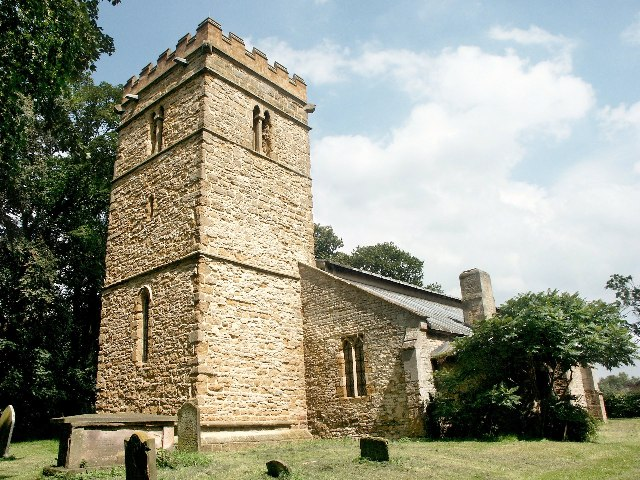
- Church of All Saints, Cadney cum Howsham

- Location within Lincolnshire
- OS grid reference: TA046041
  - London: 140 mi (230 km) S
- Civil parish: Cadney
- Unitary authority: North Lincolnshire
- Ceremonial county: Lincolnshire
- Region: Yorkshire and the Humber
- Country: England
- Sovereign state: United Kingdom
- Post town: MARKET RASEN
- Postcode district: LN7
- Dialling code: 01652
- Police: Humberside
- Fire: Humberside
- Ambulance: East Midlands
- UK Parliament: Scunthorpe

Cadney cum Howsham is a former civil parish, now in the parish of Cadney, in the North Lincolnshire district, in the ceremonial county of Lincolnshire, England. It consisted of the villages of Cadney and Howsham, several farms, and mainly arable farmland. In 1931 the parish had a population of 400. On the 1 April 1936 the civil parish was abolished and merged with Newstead to form Cadney.
