= Crowle and Ealand =

Civil parish in Lincolnshire, England

Coordinates: 53.607°N 0.832°W

- Civil parish Town
- Country park at Tetley Ealand war memorial Crowle market place

- Location within Lincolnshire
- Area: 14 sq mi (36 km^{2})
- Population: 4,862 (2021)
  - Density: 347/sq mi (134/km^{2})
- OS grid reference: SE772128
  - London: 145 mi (233 km) S
- Unitary authority: North Lincolnshire
- Ceremonial county: Lincolnshire
- Region: Yorkshire and the Humber
- Country: England
- Sovereign state: United Kingdom
- Settlements: Crowle; Ealand; Tetley
- Post town: SCUNTHORPE
- Postcode district: DN17
- Dialling code: 01724
- Police: Humberside
- Fire: Humberside
- Ambulance: East Midlands
- UK Parliament: Doncaster East and the Isle of Axholme
- Website: crowleandealandcouncil.org

Crowle and Ealand is a civil parish with town status in the North Lincolnshire unitary authority area of Lincolnshire, England, on the Isle of Axholme. It comprises the market town of Crowle, the neighbouring village of Ealand and the hamlet of Tetley. At the 2021 census the parish had a population of 4,862.

== Geography ==
The parish lies on the Isle of Axholme, a low-lying area of former wetland reclaimed for agriculture, which is part of the Thorne and Hatfield Moors and rich in peat. Elevation starts at 2 metres (6.6 ft), the high point is Crowle Hill to the east of the settlement at 20 metres (66 ft). Crowle occupies a slight rise, while Ealand lies to the south-east. Residential areas within Crowle include North End and Windsor. The Stainforth and Keadby Canal and the railway mainline run along the southern edge of Ealand. The A161 road serves the settlements, while the A18 parallels the southern boundary.

== History ==
=== Toponymy ===
The name Crowle is recorded in the Domesday Book as “Crule”. Suggested origins include an Old English river-name related to a winding stream or watercourse (*crull* or similar), reflecting the former marshy landscape of the Isle of Axholme.

=== Events ===
Late Neolithic/Early Bronze Age flints, Roman and Romano-British pottery (including amphora fragments) have been found in the parish, indicating activity and possible trade. Crowle is recorded in the Domesday Book of 1086 as a substantial manor in the hundred of Epworth, held by Geoffrey of la Guerche. It contained 34 households (15 villagers and 19 smallholders), a church, 31 fisheries, meadow and woodland, and was the most populous and valuable manor in the Isle of Axholme at the time.

Medieval settlement focused on Crowle, with secondary foci at Ealand and Tetley. The town developed as a market centre in the 12th–13th centuries under the influence of Selby Abbey, receiving a market charter in 1305. The Stainforth and Keadby Canal was opened in 1792 and the railway reached the area in the 1860s, stimulating growth at Ealand, which was first recorded in 1310, and first grew after the canal was built.

The Axholme Joint Railway was built running north to south through Crowle while the Great Central Railway ran to the south of Ealand. A number of stations served the area, such as Medge Hall Halt, Godnow Bridge railway station and Crowle North railway station.

Tetley was first mentioned in 1311, and in the early 18th century had a small grouping of houses in the area. It is unknown as to the reason for becoming deserted, but it was thought some agricultural use took place before Tetley Hall was built in the area around 1829-1839. South of Tetley was a brick and tile works and associated clay pits around the turn of the 20th century as well as a brewery.

Much of the surrounding moorland is rich in peat, and there has been much exploitation of the area, especially into the 19th and 20th centuries. After attempts to drain the land for agriculture, interests moved towards utilising and selling the peat and businesses sprang up and devised efficient ways to collect it. First, drainage ditches were dug and barges used to move the output. Horse drawn tramways were later used and further more, small-gauge locomotives built post WWII. Commercial activities continued into the millennium until environmental concerns led to government intervention in buying out existing licences.

The civil parish was renamed from “Crowle” to “Crowle and Ealand” in 2010 to reflect both main settlements.

== Governance ==
The parish is administered by Crowle and Ealand Town Council. It forms part of the Axholme North ward of North Lincolnshire Council and the Doncaster East and the Isle of Axholme parliamentary constituency. Historically it lay in the Manley wapentake in the Parts of Lindsey.

== Demographics ==
The 2021 census recorded a population of 4,862. Earlier figures were 4,090 (2001) and 4,828 (2011).

== Economy ==
Crowle functions as a local service and market centre with shops, public houses, and small businesses. Agriculture remains important on the surrounding fenland. Seven Lakes Leisure Park (on the site of former clay pits of the Crowle Brickworks) provides recreation and tourism. Residents also travel to Scunthorpe and Doncaster for wider employment and services. Ealand Industrial Estate, also known as Crowle Wharf, is to the south.

== Education ==
Axholme Academy secondary school is to the south of Crowle. There are nurseries and primary schools in Crowle and Ealand.

== Landmarks ==
There are 26 listed buildings in the parish. Notable buildings and heritage assets include:

- Church of St Oswald, Crowle (Grade I) – largely 12th–15th century with later restorations; contains the Crowle Stone, an important Anglo-Saxon/Norse sculptured cross shaft.
- Churchyard cross south of St Oswald’s (Grade II).
- Market Hall and various houses and inns in Crowle Conservation Area (multiple Grade II listings).
- Tetley Hall is at Grade II and dates from the 1830s period
- Curlews Farmhouse and an 18th-century house on Ealand Outgate (both Grade II) in Ealand.

The Crowle conservation area covers the historic core of the town.

A war memorial for fallen locals during the world wars was erected at Ealand.

A number of wind farms surround the parish, with a small number of turbines from the Tween Bridge project to the west extending into the parish.

== Transport ==
Crowle railway station lies on the southern edge of Ealand and provides services on the South Humberside Main Line. The A161 and A18 serve the parish; the Stainforth and Keadby Canal offers recreational navigation. Crowle Peatland Railway is a transport museum that maintains some of the locomotives formerly used for gathering peat from the moors.

== Community ==
=== Amenities ===
Facilities include the parish church, town council services, shops, public houses, play areas, primary schools and the Axholme Academy secondary school. Community events and markets continue in Crowle.

=== Leisure ===
Unity Seven Lakes (also known as Seven Lakes Country Park) is a 210–220-acre holiday park in Ealand near Crowle, North Lincolnshire, set among ten freshwater lakes formed from former clay pits. Owned by Unity Holidays since 2025, the site offers static caravan and lodge ownership/rentals, fishing, watersports (kayaking, paddleboarding, etc.), walking trails, and is undergoing a multi-million-pound redevelopment that includes a pub/restaurant. Located just off the M180 and close to Crowle railway station, it permits both holidaymakers and local residents.

The Peatlands Way is a medium distance path that commemorates the history and geology of the area. It runs from Belton to the south, comes through Ealand and Crowle before continuing into South Yorkshire.

== Religious sites ==
Church of St Oswald is a 12th century Anglican church at Crowle. St Norberts is a Catholic church and there is a Methodist church, both also in the town.

== Sport ==
The Axholme North leisure centre is based at the Axholme Academy secondary school. There are recreational grounds at Crowle. Crowle Colts FC are a football team with local playing fields.

== Notable people ==
- Lee Ridley (1981–), sportsman
