= Tetley, Lincolnshire =

Hamlet of Lincolnshire, England

Coordinates: 53.597064°N 0.828880°W

Tetley
- Location within Lincolnshire
- OS grid reference: SE776118
  - London: 155 mi (249 km) S
- Civil parish: Crowle and Ealand
- Unitary authority: North Lincolnshire
- Ceremonial county: Lincolnshire
- Region: Yorkshire and the Humber
- Country: England
- Sovereign state: United Kingdom
- Postcode district: DN17
- Police: Humberside
- Fire: Humberside
- Ambulance: East Midlands
- UK Parliament: Doncaster East and the Isle of Axholme

Tetley is a hamlet, between of the town of Crowle and the village of Ealand, in the North Lincolnshire district of Lincolnshire, England. It is in the civil parish of Crowle and Ealand.

The hamlet is considered to be the site of a deserted medieval village and is known to have existed in 1316.

Tetley Hall is a Grade II listed building dating from 1829 to 1839 for Henry Lister Maw, although its range is late 18th century, and built for George Stovin. The stables and granary are also Grade II listed.

Near Tetley Hall is a limestone font which is perhaps from the mid-17th century, and possibly from the Protestant church in Sandtoft.
