= Hardwick, West Lindsey =

Civil parish in Lincolnshire, England

Coordinates: 53.271012°N 0.69771030°W

Hardwick
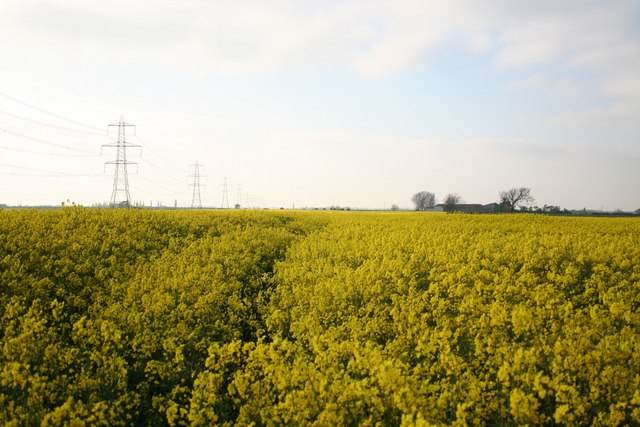

- Location within Lincolnshire
- Area: 3.967 km^{2} (1.532 sq mi)
- Population: 44 (2001 census)
  - Density: 11/km^{2} (28/sq mi)
- Civil parish: Hardwick
- District: West Lindsey
- Shire county: Lincolnshire
- Region: East Midlands
- Country: England
- Sovereign state: United Kingdom
- Police: Lincolnshire
- Fire: Lincolnshire
- Ambulance: East Midlands

Hardwick is a civil parish about 7 miles from Lincoln, in the West Lindsey district, in the county of Lincolnshire, England. In 2001 the parish had a population of 44. The parish touches Fenton, Kettlethorpe, Saxilby with Ingleby, Thorney and Torksey.

== History ==
The name "Hardwick" means 'Herd farm'. Hardwick was recorded in the Domesday Book as Harduic. Thomas Cantock, later Bishop of Emly and Lord Chancellor of Ireland, was appointed parish priest of Hardwick in 1291. Hardwick was formerly a township in the parish of Torksey, in 1866 Hardwick became a civil parish in its own right.
