= Burtoft =

Hamlet in the civil parish of Wigtoft, Lincolnshire, England

Coordinates: 52.889°N 0.120°W

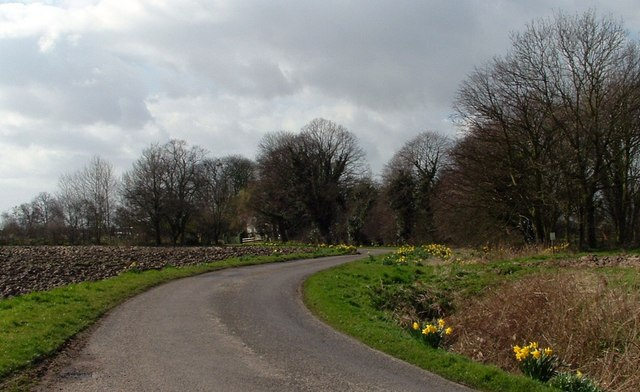
- Road approaching Burtoft

- Location within Lincolnshire
- OS grid reference: TF265341
  - London: 95 mi (153 km) S
- Civil parish: Wigtoft
- Shire county: Lincolnshire
- Region: East Midlands
- Country: England
- Sovereign state: United Kingdom
- Post town: Boston
- Postcode district: PE20
- Police: Lincolnshire
- Fire: Lincolnshire
- Ambulance: East Midlands
- UK Parliament: Boston and Skegness (UK Parliament constituency)

Burtoft is a hamlet in the civil parish of Wigtoft, Lincolnshire, England, approximately 7 miles (11 km) southwest of the market town of Boston. There are seven houses in Burtoft.

Burtoft is mentioned in the Domesday Book of 1086.
