= South Reston =

Village in the East Lindsey district of Lincolnshire, England

Coordinates: 53.329669°N 0.100621°E

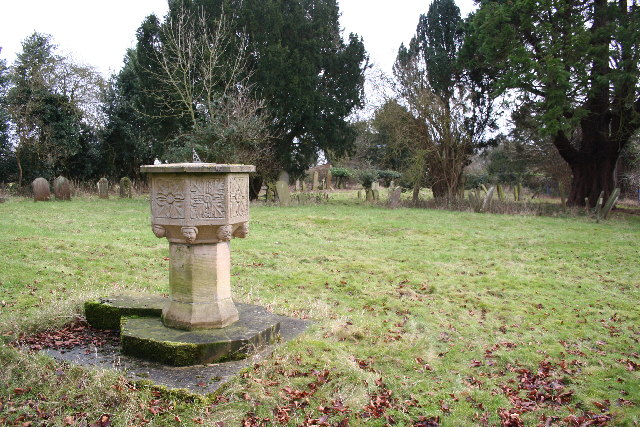
- Font in St Edith's churchyard, South Reston

- Location within Lincolnshire
- OS grid reference: TF399834
  - London: 125 mi (201 km) S
- Civil parish: Reston
- District: East Lindsey
- Shire county: Lincolnshire
- Region: East Midlands
- Country: England
- Sovereign state: United Kingdom
- Post town: Louth
- Postcode district: LN11
- Police: Lincolnshire
- Fire: Lincolnshire
- Ambulance: East Midlands
- UK Parliament: Louth and Horncastle

South Reston is a village in the civil parish of Reston, in the East Lindsey district of Lincolnshire, England. It is situated on the A157 road 5 miles (8.0 km) south-east from the town of Louth.

In 1971 the parish had a population of 144. The parish of South Reston was enlarged by the abolition of the parish of Castle Carlton on 1 April 1936. On 1 April 1987 the parish was abolished and merged with North Reston to form "Reston".

South Reston parish church was dedicated to Saint Edith; it was declared redundant by the Diocese of Lincoln in 1980, and demolished in 1982. The 15th-century octagonal font remains in the churchyard, as a sundial, and is Grade II listed.

The Hall is a Grade II listed brick farmhouse dating from the 17th century.

South Reston school was built in 1858 and survived long enough to celebrate its centenary.

There is also a Methodist church and a public house, the Waggon and Horses.
