= Wigtoft =

Village and civil parish in Lincolnshire, England

Coordinates: 52.907846°N 0.124179°W

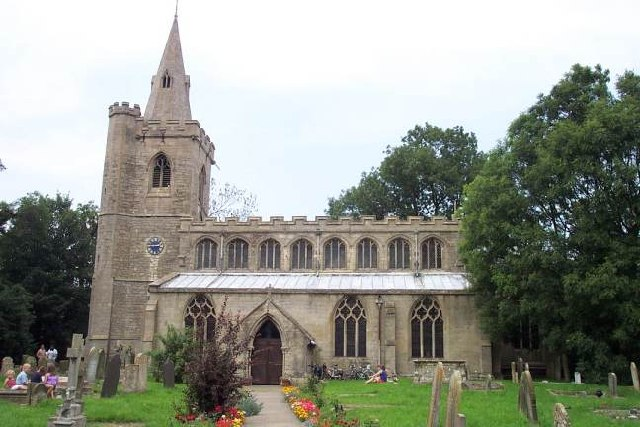
- Church of St Peter and St Paul, Wigtoft

- Location within Lincolnshire
- Population: 488 (2021)
- OS grid reference: TF262361
  - London: 100 mi (160 km) S
- District: Boston
- Shire county: Lincolnshire
- Region: East Midlands
- Country: England
- Sovereign state: United Kingdom
- Post town: Boston
- Postcode district: PE20
- Police: Lincolnshire
- Fire: Lincolnshire
- Ambulance: East Midlands
- UK Parliament: Boston and Skegness (UK Parliament constituency)

Wigtoft is a village and civil parish in Lincolnshire, England. It is situated on the A17 road, 6 miles (10 km) geographically south-west from Boston, Lincolnshire, and 1 mile (1.6 km) west from Sutterton. Included in Wigtoft civil parish are the hamlets of Asperton and Burtoft.

The name 'Wigtoft' derives from the Old Norse and Old English, vik-toft, meaning 'curtilage by a creek'.

Wigtoft is one of eighteen parishes which, together with Boston, form the Borough of Boston. The local government has been arranged in this way since the reorganisation of 1 April 1974, which resulted from the Local Government Act 1972. This parish forms part of the Five Villages electoral ward.

Previously, the parish had formed part of Boston Rural District, in the Parts of Holland. Holland was one of the three divisions (formally known as parts) of the traditional county of Lincolnshire. Since the Local Government Act 1888, Holland had been in most respects, a county in itself.

The parish church is a Grade I listed building dedicated to Saint Peter and Saint Paul and dating from the 12th to 15th centuries and restored in 1891.

Year	Population
1801	536
1811	555
1821	637
1831	697
1841	713
1851	741
1881	672
1891	653
1901	693
1911	723
1921	712
1931	702
1941	N/A (World War II)
1951	518
1961	505
1971	448
2001	479
2011	491
2021	488
