= Pepper Gowt Plot =

Hamlet in Lincolnshire, England

Coordinates: 53.002092°N 0.051812°W

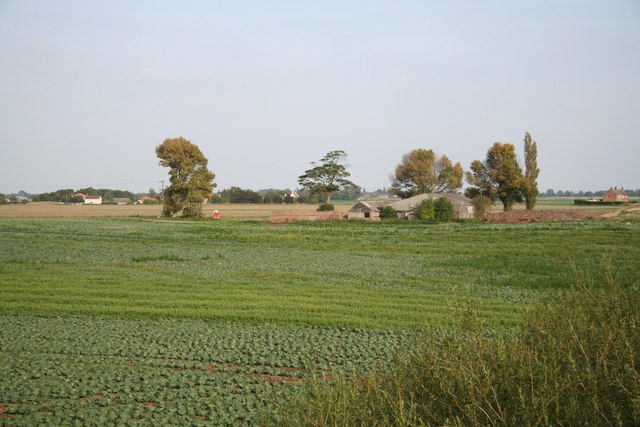
- Pepper Gowt, or Rowlands Marsh, now Witham Marsh

- Location within Lincolnshire
- OS grid reference: TF308467
  - London: 105 mi (169 km) S
- Civil parish: Fishtoft
- District: Boston
- Shire county: Lincolnshire
- Region: East Midlands
- Country: England
- Sovereign state: United Kingdom
- Post town: Boston
- Postcode district: PE21
- Dialling code: 01205
- Police: Lincolnshire
- Fire: Lincolnshire
- Ambulance: East Midlands
- UK Parliament: Boston and Skegness

Pepper Gowt Plot, also known as Rowlands Marsh, was a hamlet and small tract of extra-parochial land and civil parish, created when the River Witham was straightened in the early 19th century, now in the parish of Fishtoft, in the Boston district, in the county of Lincolnshire, England. It lies about 2 miles (3 km) north of the town of Boston, and immediately south of Anton's Gowt.

It was created as a civil parish in 1858, when the principal land owner was John Rowland. On 1 April 1906 it was abolished and merged with Skirbeck. In 1901 the parish had a population of 13. In turn, Skirbeck civil parish was abolished in 1932 to enlarge the parishes of Boston and Fishtoft, Today the area is known as Witham Marsh.
