= Counthorpe =

Hamlet in Lincolnshire, England

Coordinates: 52°46′14″N 0°30′45″W

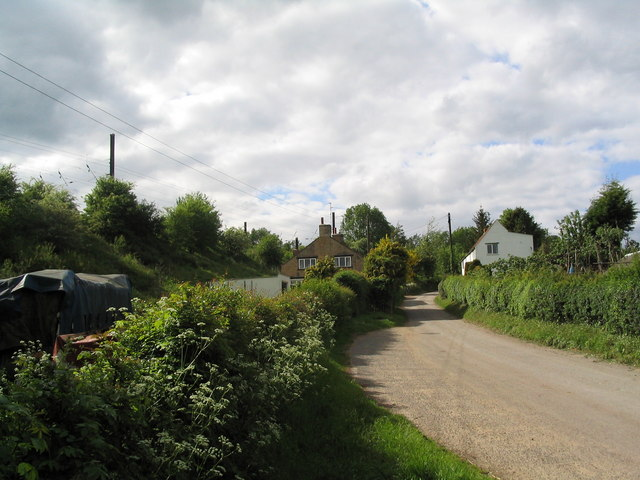
- Counthorpe

- Location within Lincolnshire
- OS grid reference: TF013198
  - London: 85 mi (137 km) S
- Civil parish: Counthorpe and Creeton
- District: South Kesteven
- Shire county: Lincolnshire
- Region: East Midlands
- Country: England
- Sovereign state: United Kingdom
- Post town: Grantham
- Postcode district: NG33
- Police: Lincolnshire
- Fire: Lincolnshire
- Ambulance: East Midlands
- UK Parliament: Grantham and Stamford

Counthorpe is a hamlet in the civil parish of Counthorpe and Creeton in the South Kesteven district of Lincolnshire, England. It adjoins the hamlet of Creeton and lies 5 miles (8 km) south-west from Bourne and 3 miles (5 km) south from Corby Glen, and on the River Glen.

In the Domesday account Counthorpe is written as "Cudetorp". Before the Conquest lordship was held by Earl Morcar; after, Drogo de la Beuvrière became Tenant-in-chief.

Counthorpe shares the Grade I listed Anglican parish church at Creeton, dedicated to St Peter. The church is of late Decorated style. A restoration of 1851 discovered the arches and piers of a former Norman aisle. The church holds a chained bible from 1611. Two examples of Saxon crosses stand in the churchyard, with 20 stone coffins considered to mark the interment of Cistercian monks of Vallis Dei abbey in the neighbouring parish of Edenham.

Counthorpe was formerly a hamlet in the parish of Castle Bytham and had, up to the 16th century, its own parochial chapel, but was annexed to Creeton in 1860.

Counthorpe is recorded in the 1872 White's Directory as a small village in the parish of Castle Bytham, but which, for ecclesiastical purposes, became on 30 June 1860 united with Creeton. The village was 2 miles (3 km) from Little Bytham railway station. At this time Counthope was a township of 78 people in about 130 acres (0.5 km^{2}) of land divided between three farms; a farmer of one of these, at Counthorpe Lodge, was also a grazier.

In 1866 Counthorpe became a separate civil parish, on 1 April 1931 the parish was abolished and merged with Creeton to form "Counthorpe and Creeton". In 1921 the parish had a population of 74.
