= Howsham, Lincolnshire =

Village in the civil parish of Cadney in North Lincolnshire, England

Coordinates: 53.525270°N 0.424730°W

Howsham
- Location within Lincolnshire
- OS grid reference: TA045043
  - London: 140 mi (230 km) S
- Civil parish: Cadney
- Unitary authority: North Lincolnshire
- Ceremonial county: Lincolnshire
- Region: Yorkshire and the Humber
- Country: England
- Sovereign state: United Kingdom
- Post town: MARKET RASEN
- Postcode district: LN7
- Police: Humberside
- Fire: Humberside
- Ambulance: East Midlands
- UK Parliament: Scunthorpe

Howsham is a village in the civil parish of Cadney in North Lincolnshire, England. It lies on the B1434 road, 3.5 miles (6 km) south from Barnetby and 3 miles (5 km) south-east from Brigg.
