= Castle Carlton =

Hamlet in Lincolnshire, England

Coordinates: 53°19′55″N 0°05′58″E

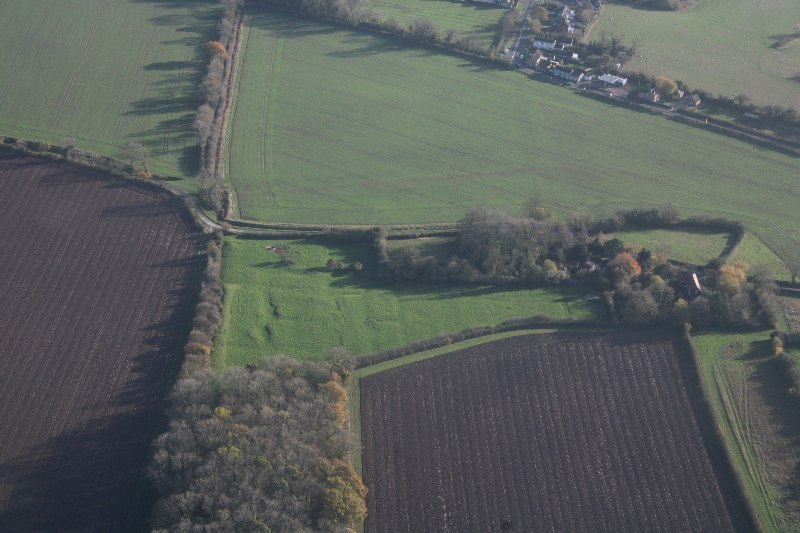
- Aerial photograph of Castle Carlton showing the remains of tofts and crofts of the medieval new town

- Location within Lincolnshire
- OS grid reference: TF398837
  - London: 130 mi (210 km) S
- Civil parish: Reston
- District: East Lindsey
- Shire county: Lincolnshire
- Region: East Midlands
- Country: England
- Sovereign state: United Kingdom
- Post town: Louth
- Postcode district: LN11
- Police: Lincolnshire
- Fire: Lincolnshire
- Ambulance: East Midlands
- UK Parliament: Louth and Horncastle

Castle Carlton is a hamlet and former civil parish, now in the parish of Reston, in the East Lindsey district of Lincolnshire, England. It is approximately 5 miles (8 km) south of Louth, and just north of the A157 road. In 1931 the parish had a population of 23. On 1 April 1936 the parish was abolished and merged with South Reston.

At Castle Carlton, there is a wide moat surrounding a mound on which stood a twelfth-century motte and bailey castle, most likely wooden, founded by Justiciar Hugh Bardolph, who is said to have slain a monster.

The village had established itself as a commercial centre by the thirteenth century, reputedly after Hugh Bardolph developed it as a "new town", and it was sometimes known as Market Carlton. Today, it is considered a deserted medieval village, or DMV.

The church was dedicated to the Holy Cross and was a small Perpendicular building. It was demolished in 1902.
