= Edlington with Wispington =

Human settlement in Lincolnshire, England

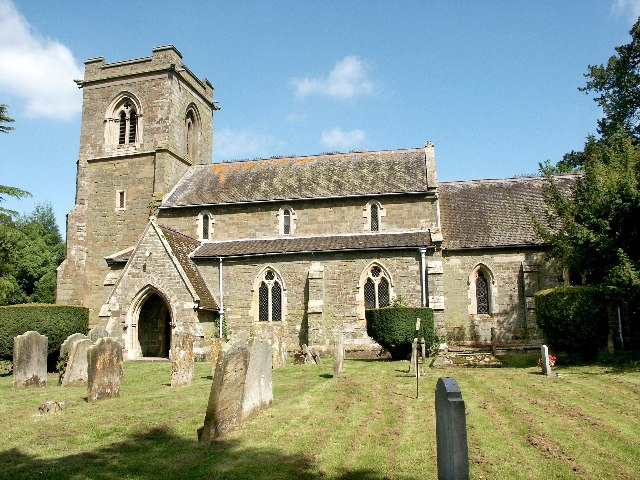
- Edlington church

- Location within Lincolnshire
- Population: 134 (2011 census)
- Civil parish: Edlington with Wispington
- District: East Lindsey
- Shire county: Lincolnshire
- Region: East Midlands
- Country: England
- Sovereign state: United Kingdom

Edlington with Wispington is a civil parish in the East Lindsey district of Lincolnshire, England. It is approximately 2 miles (3 km) north-west of Horncastle town centre. It contains the hamlets of Edlington and Wispington.

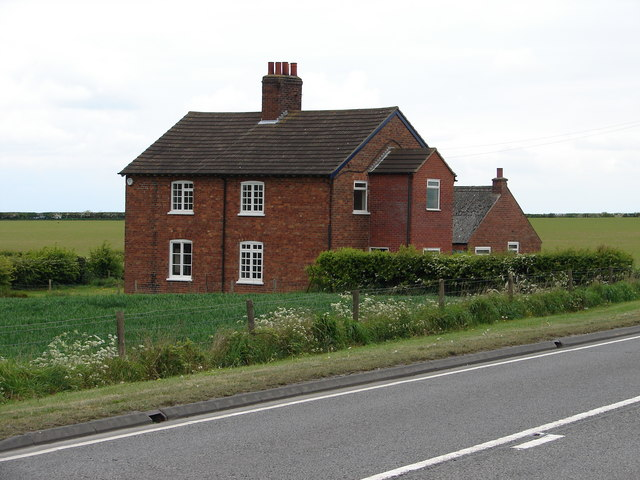
House near Barr farm

In the 2001 Census the parish population was 147, and 134 at the 2011 Census.

The parish was formed on 1 April 1987 from the Edlington and Wispington parishes. It has an annual parish meeting.

The former Edlington medieval village 53°13′08″N 0°10′44″W with a sunken road and house bases is in the parish.
