= Owersby =

Civil parish in Lincolnshire, England

Coordinates: 53.436530°N 0.40515°W

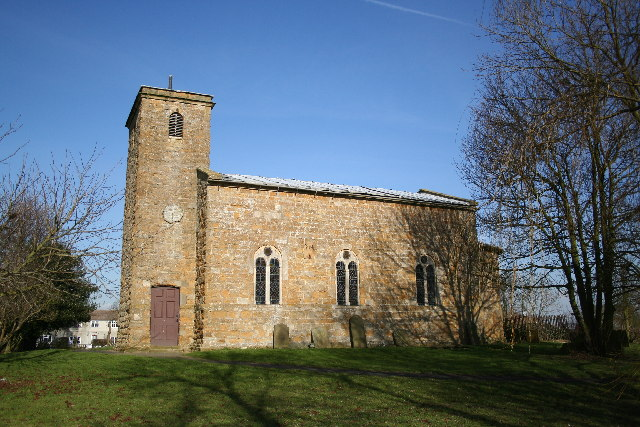
- Church of St Martin, North Owersby

- Location within Lincolnshire
- Population: 275 (Including Thornton le Moor. 2011)
- OS grid reference: TF060944
  - London: 140 mi (230 km) S
- District: West Lindsey
- Shire county: Lincolnshire
- Region: East Midlands
- Country: England
- Sovereign state: United Kingdom
- Post town: Market Rasen
- Postcode district: LN8
- Police: Lincolnshire
- Fire: Lincolnshire
- Ambulance: East Midlands
- UK Parliament: Gainsborough

Owersby is a civil parish in the West Lindsey district of Lincolnshire, England, situated about 6 miles (10 km) north-west from the market town of Market Rasen.

The parish includes the villages and hamlets of North Owersby, South Owersby, Thornton le Moor, and North and South Gulham.

Owersby was created a civil parish in 1936 out of the former parishes of North Owersby, South Owersby, and Thornton le Moor, which were separate civil parishes from 1866 to 1936. The population of the civil parish at the 2011 census was 275.
