= Aunsby and Dembleby =

Civil parish in the North Kesteven district of Lincolnshire, England

- Population: 125 (2001)
- OS grid reference: TF041382
  - London: 100 mi (160 km) S
- District: North Kesteven
- Shire county: Lincolnshire
- Region: East Midlands
- Country: England
- Sovereign state: United Kingdom
- Post town: Sleaford
- Postcode district: NG34
- Police: Lincolnshire
- Fire: Lincolnshire
- Ambulance: East Midlands
- UK Parliament: Grantham and Bourne

Aunsby and Dembleby is a civil parish in the North Kesteven district of Lincolnshire, England. According to the 2001 Census it had a population of 125. The parish includes Aunsby and Dembleby, which were separate parishes until 1931, and the hamlet of Scott Willoughby.

The three ecclesiastical parishes are part of the Parish of South Lafford in the Lafford Deanery, Diocese of Lincoln. The incumbent is the Rev'd Nick Munday.

== Aunsby ==
52°56′13″N 0°26′48″W

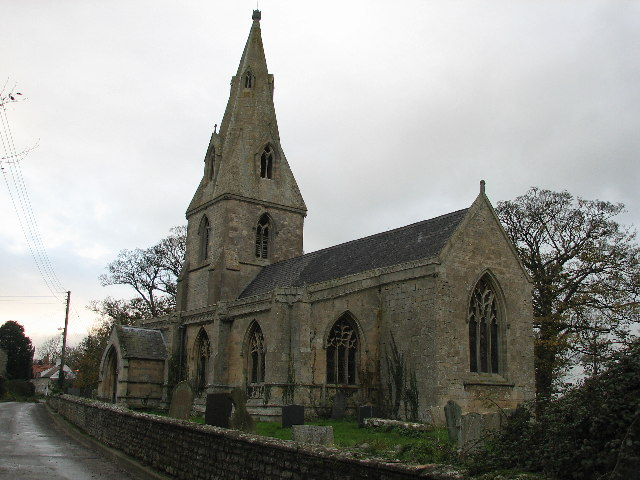
Aunsby: the church of St. Thomas

Aunsby lies just north and west off the point where the A15 crosses the A52. Its church, dedicated to St Thomas Of Canterbury, is a mixture of Norman and Perpendicular styles of architecture. It was repaired and rebuilt in 1861.

In the Domesday survey the village is called "Ounesbi".

The ecclesiastical parish is South Lafford.

== Dembleby ==
52°55′42″N 0°27′21″W

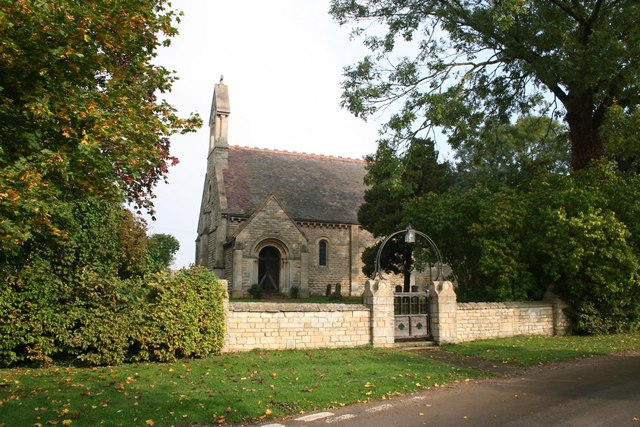
Dembleby: St Lucia's church

Dembleby appears in the Domesday survey three times, as "Denbelbi", "Delbebi" and "Dembelbi". The parish was in the ancient Aswardhurn Wapentake.

St Lucia's Church is a foundation of unknown age, originally built in Early English style. The old church was taken down in 1867. The new church was built upon a better site in Norman or Romanesque Revival style by the Sleaford architect Charles Kirk of Kirk and Parry The vestry in the current church was re-erected from the old church.

The new church was consecrated in January, 1868

The ecclesiastical parish is South Lafford.

To the west is the woodland of Dembleby Thorns.

== Scott Willoughby ==
52°55′31″N 0°26′02″W

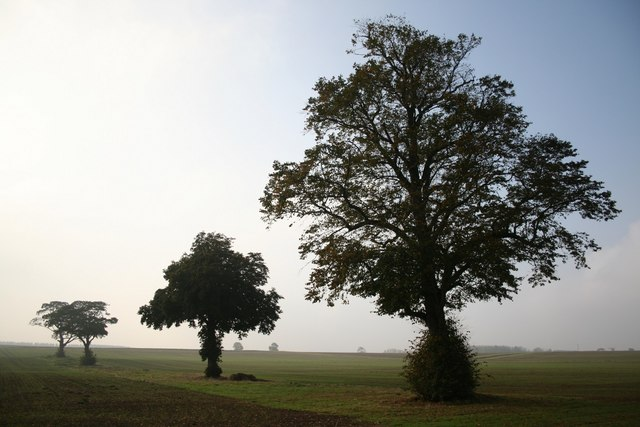
Countryside at Scott Willoughby

Scott Willoughby is a small hamlet situated less than 1 mile (1.6 km) south-east from Aunsby. It has the smallest church that remains in use in the county. It was built in 1826, although there may have been an earlier church on the site.

The ecclesiastical parish is South Lafford.

The population of Scott Willoughby has rapidly declined over the past 200 years, with few houses remaining in the hamlet; despite this the post-box is still used.

== Lost villages ==
Several abandoned medieval villages are known in the wider area.

- Dembeleby is a Shrunken Village, considerably larger in medieval times.
- Scott Willoughby is a Shrunken Village, or more properly a modern hamlet named for a nearby medieval site
- Crofton is mentioned in documents of the twelfth century, and the name is associated with two modern houses to the North West of the parish.52°56′51″N 0°25′55″W

== Businesses ==
All employment in the parish is agricultural.
