= Marshchapel =

Coastal village and civil parish in East Lindsey, Lincolnshire, England

Coordinates: 53.473479°N 0.045934°E

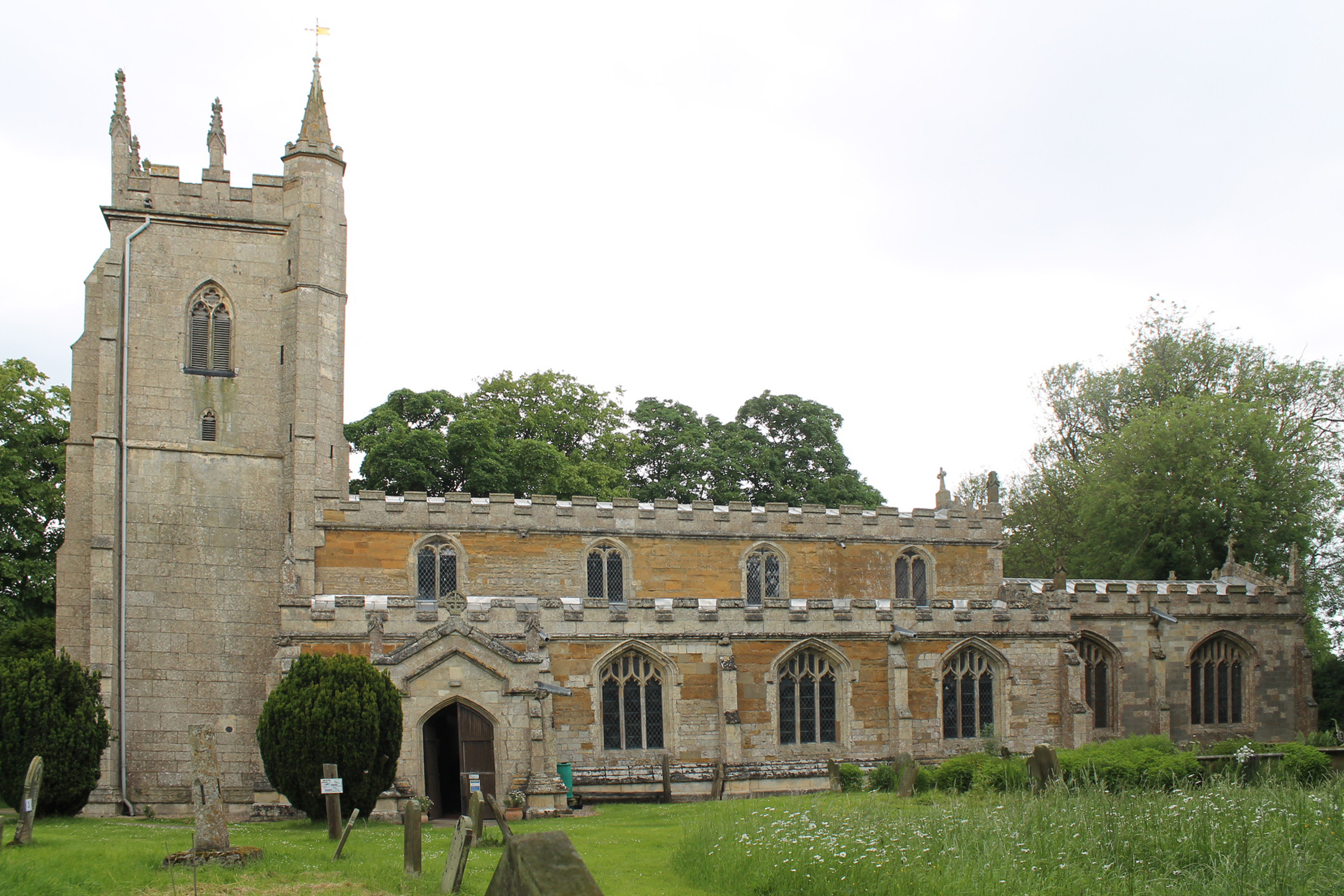
- St Mary's church

- Location within Lincolnshire
- Population: 704 (2011)
- OS grid reference: TF358993
  - London: 140 mi (230 km) S
- Civil parish: Marshchapel
- District: East Lindsey
- Shire county: Lincolnshire
- Region: East Midlands
- Country: England
- Sovereign state: United Kingdom
- Post town: Grimsby
- Postcode district: DN36
- Police: Lincolnshire
- Fire: Lincolnshire
- Ambulance: East Midlands
- UK Parliament: Louth and Horncastle

Marshchapel is a coastal village and civil parish in the East Lindsey district of Lincolnshire, England. It is approximately 11 miles (18 km) south-east from Grimsby and 13 miles (21 km) north-east from Louth. It includes the hamlets of West End and Eskham. In 2011 the parish had a population of 704.

Marshchapel has a village store cum post office, a primary school, and one public house, The White Horse.

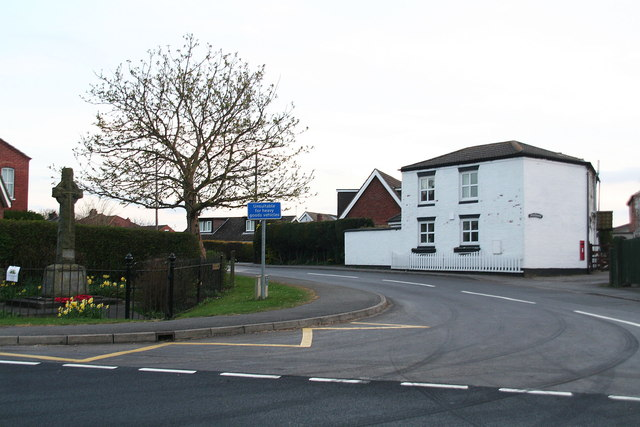
The corner of Church Lane and the war memorial

The church, dedicated to St Mary is a Grade I listed building dating from the 15th century with a chancel dating from 1848. St Mary's is often referred to as the "Cathedral of the Marshes". In the churchyard is a cross dating from the 14th century which was originally sited at the crossroads near West End. It is both Grade II listed and a scheduled monument.

Marshchapel Primary School was originally built as a National School and was rebuilt in 1872, and has been known by its current name since September 1999. Grainthorpe Primary School is the follow on school from years 3 to 6.

Marshchapel was the site of Anglo-Saxon salt-working.

== Governance ==
An electoral ward in the same name exists. This ward stretches south west to Yarburgh with a total population taken at the 2011 Census of 2,194.
