= Tothby =

Hamlet near Alford, in the East Lindsey district of Lincolnshire, England

Coordinates: 53.266663°N 0.165254°E

- Location within Lincolnshire
- OS grid reference: TF445765
  - London: 125 mi (201 km) S
- Civil parish: Alford
- District: East Lindsey
- Shire county: Lincolnshire
- Region: East Midlands
- Country: England
- Sovereign state: United Kingdom
- Post town: Alford
- Postcode district: LN13
- Police: Lincolnshire
- Fire: Lincolnshire
- Ambulance: East Midlands
- UK Parliament: Louth and Horncastle

Tothby is a hamlet less than 1 mile (1.6 km) north from the town of Alford, in the East Lindsey district of Lincolnshire, England.

In the 1086 Domesday Book Tothby is listed as "Touedebi", consisting of three households, 20 acres (0.1 km^{2}) of meadow and 12 acres (0.05 km^{2}) of woodland.

Today Tothby considered a deserted medieval village, and the only extant property is Tothby Manor House, a Grade II listed building dating from the mid-17th century with alterations around 1840. Built of red brick, the house stands behind a moated enclosure, the site of the early Tothby Manor, home of the founder of the 14th-century church of St Wilfrid, Alford. The Manor was bought by Sir Robert Christopher in the mid-17th century when the present farmhouse was first built.
