= Reston, Lincolnshire =

Civil parish in East Lindsey, Lincolnshire, England

Coordinates: 53.332115°N 0.077595°E

Reston
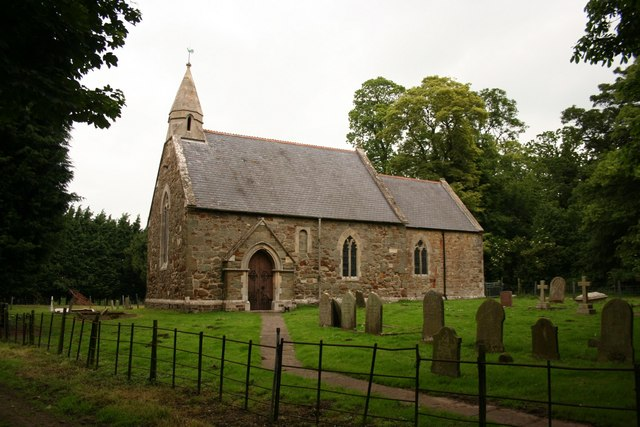
- St Edith's Church, North Reston

- Location within Lincolnshire
- Population: 205 (2011)
- OS grid reference: TF384837
  - London: 125 mi (201 km) S
- District: East Lindsey
- Shire county: Lincolnshire
- Region: East Midlands
- Country: England
- Sovereign state: United Kingdom
- Post town: Louth
- Postcode district: LN11
- Police: Lincolnshire
- Fire: Lincolnshire
- Ambulance: East Midlands
- UK Parliament: Louth and Horncastle

Reston is a civil parish in the East Lindsey district of Lincolnshire, England. It is situated on the A157, and approximately 5 miles (8 km) south from the market town of Louth.

It comprises the villages of North Reston, South Reston, and Castle Carlton.
