= North Owersby =

Village in Lincolnshire, England

Coordinates: 53.436530°N 0.40515°W

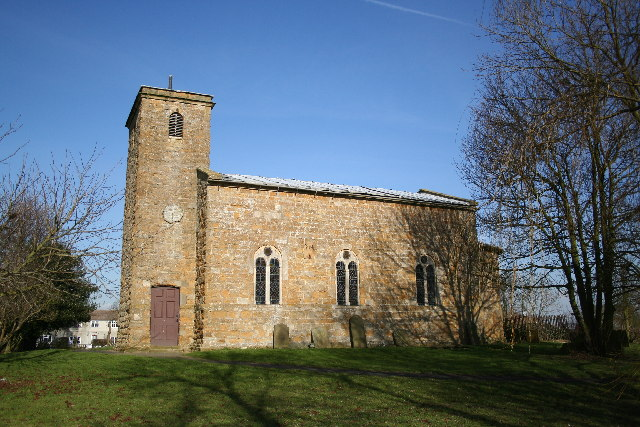
- St Martin's Church, North Owersby

- Location within Lincolnshire
- OS grid reference: TF060944
  - London: 135 mi (217 km) S
- Civil parish: Owersby
- District: West Lindsey
- Shire county: Lincolnshire
- Region: East Midlands
- Country: England
- Sovereign state: United Kingdom
- Post town: Market Rasen
- Postcode district: LN8
- Police: Lincolnshire
- Fire: Lincolnshire
- Ambulance: East Midlands
- UK Parliament: Gainsborough

North Owersby is a village and former civil parish, now in the parish of Owersby, in the West Lindsey district of Lincolnshire, England, and about 6 miles (10 km) north from the town of Market Rasen. In 1866 North Owersby became a civil parish, on 1 April 1936 the parish was abolished and merged with Owersby. In 1931 the parish had a population of 249.

The parish church is dedicated to Saint Martin and is a Grade II listed building. It was totally rebuilt 1762 using medieval ironstone masonry, and was altered in the 19th century. The font dates from the 18th century.

There are two Grade II listed farmhouses in the village, Hall Farm, and Manor Farm, both of which were built of yellow brick about 1835.
