= Maltby, Lincolnshire =

Hamlet in the East Lindsey district of Lincolnshire, England

Coordinates: 53.336716°N 0.033184°W

Maltby
- Location within Lincolnshire
- OS grid reference: TF310840
  - London: 125 mi (201 km) S
- District: East Lindsey
- Shire county: Lincolnshire
- Region: East Midlands
- Country: England
- Sovereign state: United Kingdom
- Post town: Louth
- Postcode district: LN11
- Police: Lincolnshire
- Fire: Lincolnshire
- Ambulance: East Midlands
- UK Parliament: Louth and Horncastle

Maltby is a hamlet in the East Lindsey district of Lincolnshire, England. It forms part of Raithby cum Maltby civil parish, and is situated on the A153, 3 miles (5 km) south-west from Louth. It is in the civil parish of Tathwell.

The Knights Templars had a preceptory here, later owned by the Knights Hospitallers.
