= North Reston =

Village in Lincolnshire, England

Coordinates: 53.332115°N 0.077595°E

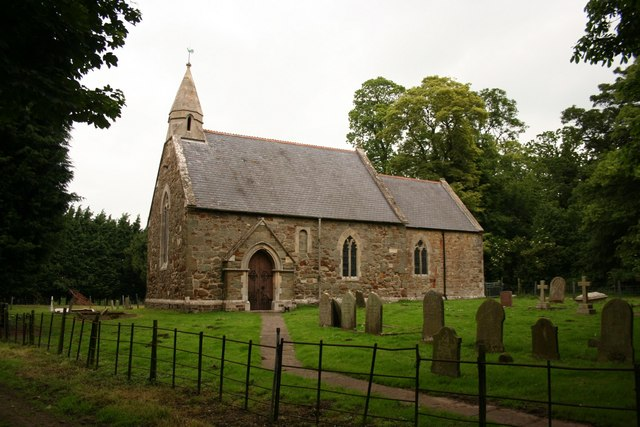
- Church of St Edith, North Reston

- Location within Lincolnshire
- OS grid reference: TF384837
  - London: 125 mi (201 km) S
- Civil parish: Reston
- District: East Lindsey
- Shire county: Lincolnshire
- Region: East Midlands
- Country: England
- Sovereign state: United Kingdom
- Post town: Louth
- Postcode district: LN11
- Police: Lincolnshire
- Fire: Lincolnshire
- Ambulance: East Midlands
- UK Parliament: Louth and Horncastle

North Reston is a village and former civil parish, now in the parish of Reston, in the East Lindsey district of Lincolnshire, England, and on the A157 road about 4 miles (6 km) south-east from the town of Louth. In 1961 the parish had a population of 36. On 1 April 1987 the parish was abolished and merged with South Reston to form "Reston".

North Reston is listed in the 1086 Domesday Book with 13 households, a meadow of 30 acres (0.12 km^{2}), woodland of 100 acres (0.40 km^{2}), 2 mills, and one church.

The parish church is dedicated to Saint Edith and a Grade II* listed building. Dating from the 11th century, it was largely rebuilt using greenstone and ironstone in 1868 by R. T. Withers, with some reused early medieval material.

North Reston Hall is a Grade II listed late 17th-century painted brick farmhouse with early 19th-century additions and some 20th-century alterations.
