= Kates Bridge =

Landmark settlement on the A15 road, in the parish of Thurlby

Coordinates: 52.71956°N 0.36399°W

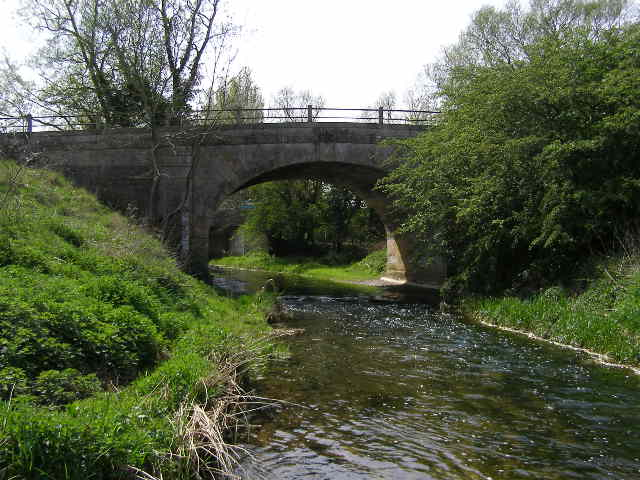
- The old turnpike bridge

- Location within Lincolnshire
- OS grid reference: TF105148
  - London: 85 mi (137 km) S
- District: South Kesteven
- Shire county: Lincolnshire
- Region: East Midlands
- Country: England
- Sovereign state: United Kingdom
- Postcode district: PE6
- Police: Lincolnshire
- Fire: Lincolnshire
- Ambulance: East Midlands
- UK Parliament: Grantham and Stamford

Kates Bridge is a landmark settlement on the A15 road, in the parish of Thurlby. It is approximately 3 miles (5 km) south from Bourne, Lincolnshire, England. Today, Kates Bridge consists of little more than three bridges, a petrol filling station, tractor dealership, five houses, and a farm.

== History ==
In the early 20th century, people from nearby villages found employment in the brickyard. Before then, it was the head of navigation on the River Glen. Lying close to the A 15's junction with the modern King Street is where the Roman road crossed the Glen. This was the only section of river bed with a solid rock bottom thus a safe point to ford before the bridge was built. The name comes from a time when fords were more commonplace than bridges. During the thirteenth century this area was passed between two bishops as 'Caterbrig'. However, the other side of the river was known by the Anglo-Saxon name, Thetford (public ford), a name retained in Thetford House. Because of this nomenclature, a Roman origin for the bridge is doubtful. The earliest known record of the bridge is shown on Saxton's map of Lincolnshire, published in 1579.

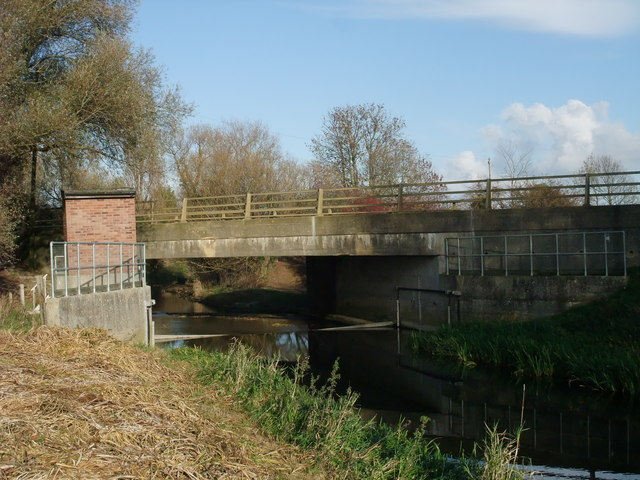
New Bridge at Kates Bridge

In the 1820s, John Loudon McAdam was working on the turnpike here. It is unclear if he supervised the construction of the early nineteenth-century bridge which still crosses the River Glen on a single stone arch, now carrying the Macmillan Way long-distance footpath. Kates Bridge no longer carries the road, which now crosses the river on a nearby structure built in the 1970s.

The site is at the edge of the drainage area of the Welland and Deeping Internal Drainage Board.
