= Rigsby, Lincolnshire =

Village in England

Coordinates: 53.256472°N 0.141586°E

Rigsby
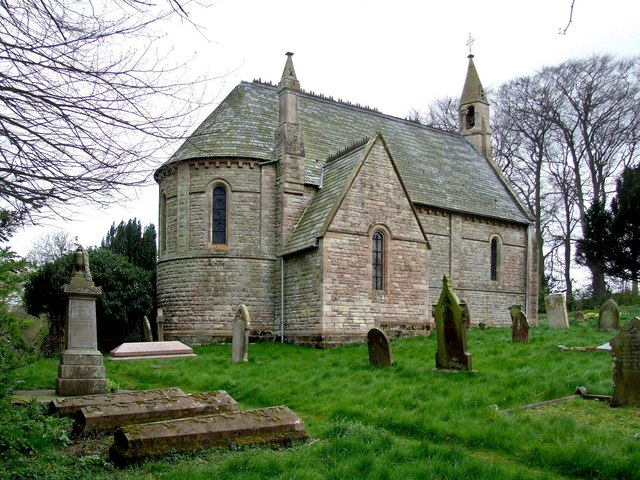
- St James' Church, Rigsby

- Location within Lincolnshire
- OS grid reference: TF429754
  - London: 120 mi (190 km) S
- District: East Lindsey
- Shire county: Lincolnshire
- Region: East Midlands
- Country: England
- Sovereign state: United Kingdom
- Post town: Alford
- Postcode district: LN13
- Police: Lincolnshire
- Fire: Lincolnshire
- Ambulance: East Midlands
- UK Parliament: Louth and Horncastle

Rigsby is a village and part of the civil parish of Rigsby with Ailby, in the East Lindsey district of Lincolnshire, England. It is situated approximately 2 miles (3 km) west from the town of Alford.

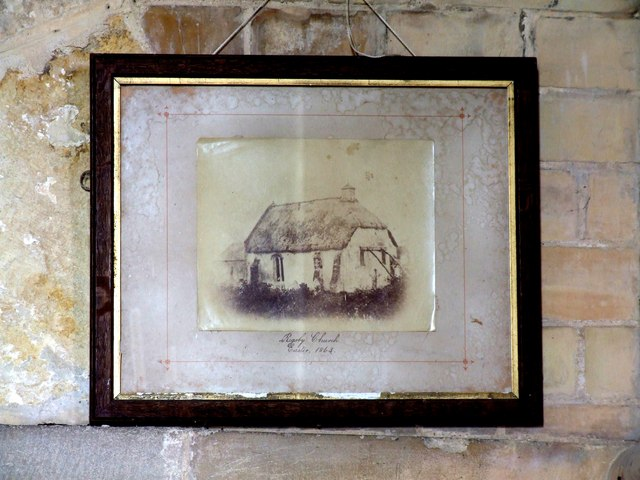
Old church, Rigsby

Rigsby is listed in the 1086 Domesday Book as "Rigesbi", with 19 households and a church.

The Old church of Rigsby, which was rebuilt in 1863, had a thatched roof. Today the church is a Grade II listed building of limestone dedicated to Saint James, rebuilt in 1863 by James Fowler. It retains a 14th-century octagonal font.

Rigsby Wood is a nature reserve which lies at the foot of the Lincolnshire Wolds about 1.8 miles (2.9 km) west from Alford. It is ancient woodland lying partly on chalky boulder clay and partly on glacial sands.
