= Counthorpe and Creeton =

Civil parish in Lincolnshire, England

Coordinates: 52.77°N 0.51°W

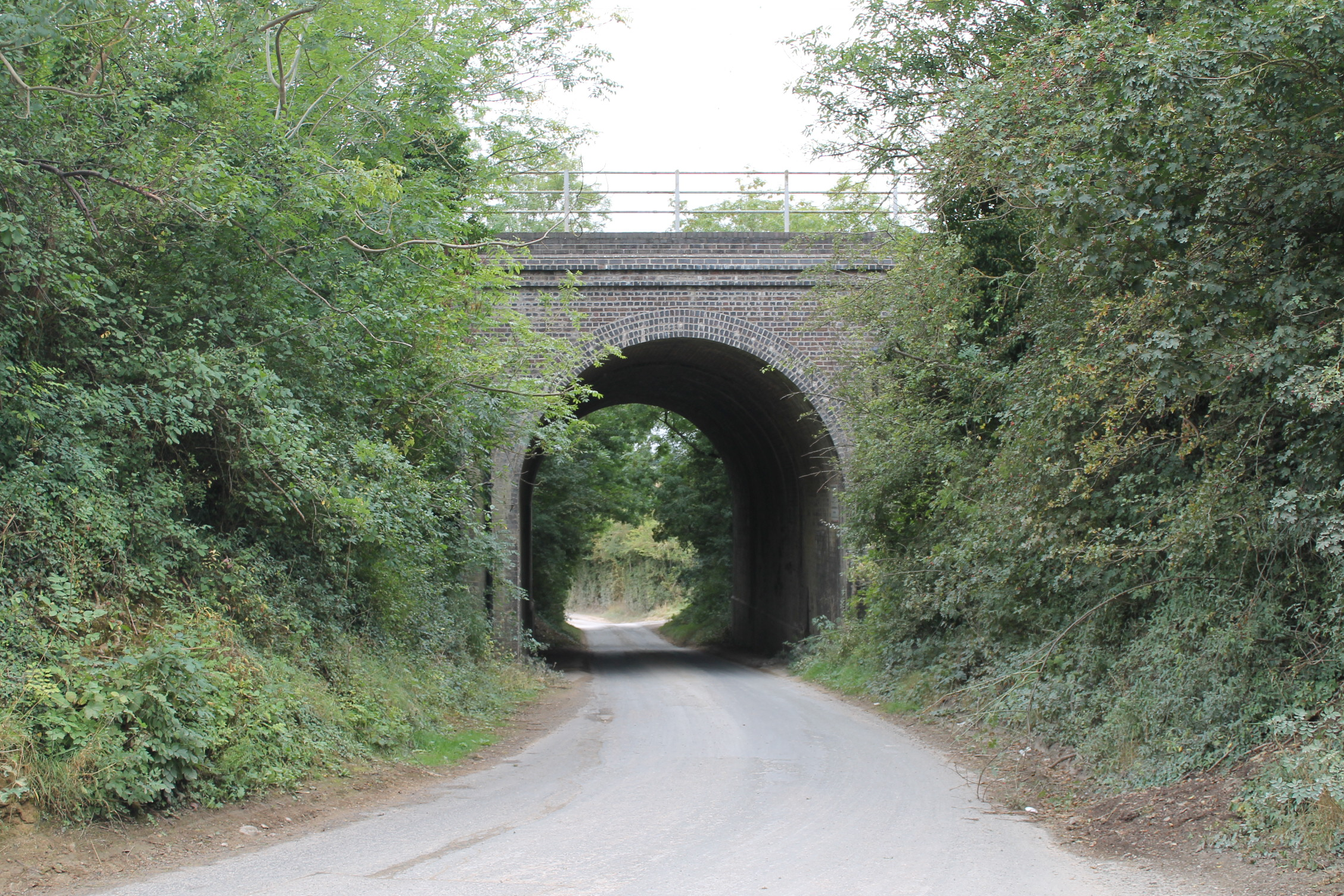
The East Coast Main Line crosses Counthorpe lane at TF006203

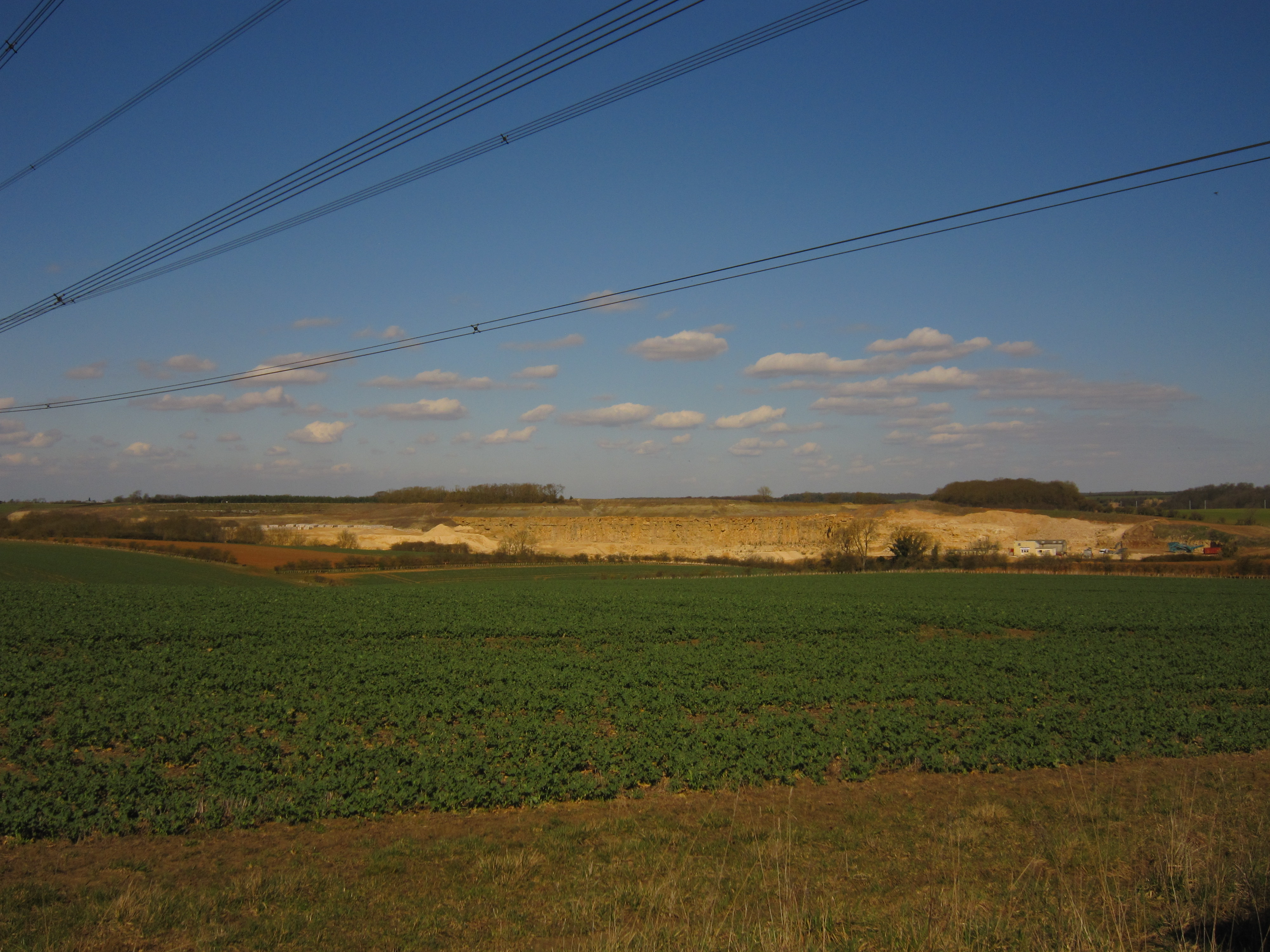
Creeton Quarries

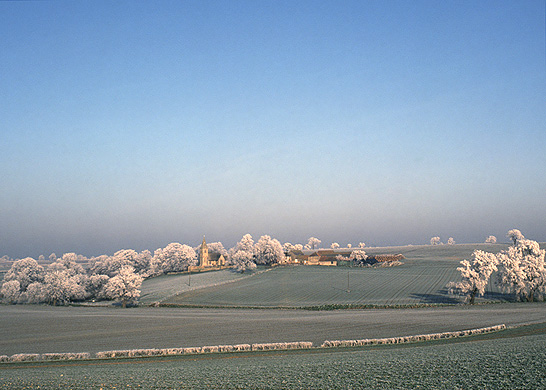
The valley of the west Glen

Counthorpe and Creeton is a civil parish in the South Kesteven district of Lincolnshire, England. According to the 2001 census it had a population of 97 across 45 homes.

== Summary ==
The civil parish includes the hamlets of Counthorpe and Creeton, to the East of the railway line. The Western half is entirely Rural save for the stone quarries.

There are no major roads through the parish, though the London-Edinburgh railway line bisects the parish. The parish is crossed by the B1176 Swinstead to Little Bytham road on the eastern half, and at the western extremity by a minor road from Swayfield to Castle Bytham. These two north–south routes are joined by two minor roads that pass east–west through the parish, meeting at the quarry before passing under the railway line at TF006203.

A large limestone quarry, at SK998206, is known as Creeton Quarry, even though it is properly in Counthorpe. It produces fine limestone for building purposes. Several small streams rise in the Parish, most of which drain into the West Glen river. There are several springs near Counthorpe House. There is a steep-sided valley south of the Quarries, through which one of the springs drains North-west, falling from around 75 or 80m to just below 55m at the bottom of the valley. To the east the West Glen runs in a wider U-shaped valley with an alluvial floor. The river is between 55m contours, with the land rising to east and west to more than 65m.

Local Democracy takes the form of a Parish Meeting
