= Cadney =

Village in Lincolnshire, England

Coordinates: 53.518°N 0.469°W

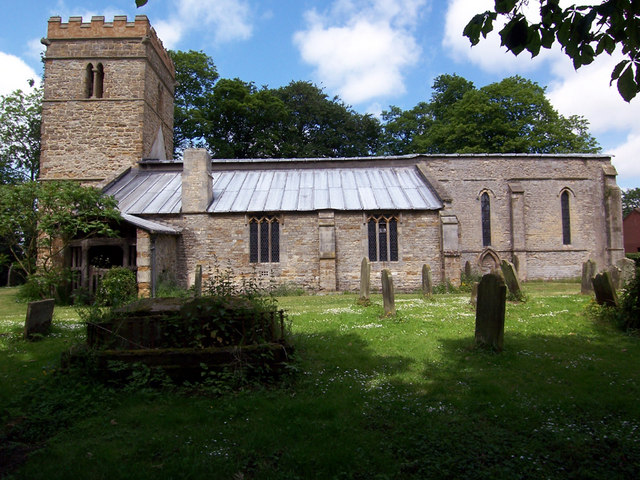
- Church of All Saints, Cadney

- Location within Lincolnshire
- Population: 459 (2011)
- OS grid reference: TA015034
  - London: 140 mi (230 km) S
- Civil parish: Cadney
- Unitary authority: North Lincolnshire
- Ceremonial county: Lincolnshire
- Region: Yorkshire and the Humber
- Country: England
- Sovereign state: United Kingdom
- Post town: Brigg
- Postcode district: DN20
- Police: Humberside
- Fire: Humberside
- Ambulance: East Midlands
- UK Parliament: Scunthorpe

Cadney is a village and civil parish in the North Lincolnshire district, in the county of Lincolnshire, England. The population of the parish at the 2011 census was 459. It is situated 3 miles (5 km) south from the town of Brigg.

Cadney's Grade I listed Anglican church is dedicated to All Saints. It is chiefly Norman, with an Early English tower and chancel, and a Norman font.

The parish was created on 1 April 1936 through the abolition of Cadney cum Howsham and Newstead. The parish boundary is defined by water on all sides, by the Old River Ancholme, Kettleby Beck and North Kelsey Beck.

Within the parish, at Newstead on the River Ancholme, lies the site of the Gilbertine Holy Trinity Priory, founded by Henry II in 1171, and endowed with the island of Ancholme, and lands around Cadney and Hardwick. The priory was limited to 13 canons and lay brothers. It was surrendered in 1538 under the act of suppression. On the site of the priory stands Newstead Priory Farmhouse, which retains the remains of a Norman vaulted room and a Perpendicular window. The farm is Grade I listed.

== Notable people ==
The clergyman and ecologist Adrian Woodruffe-Peacock made his living here from 1891 onwards, the very rural and sparsely populated parish proving useful in his development as an ecologist.
