= Raithby cum Maltby =

Civil parish in Lincolnshire, England

Coordinates: 53.343365°N 0.033595°W

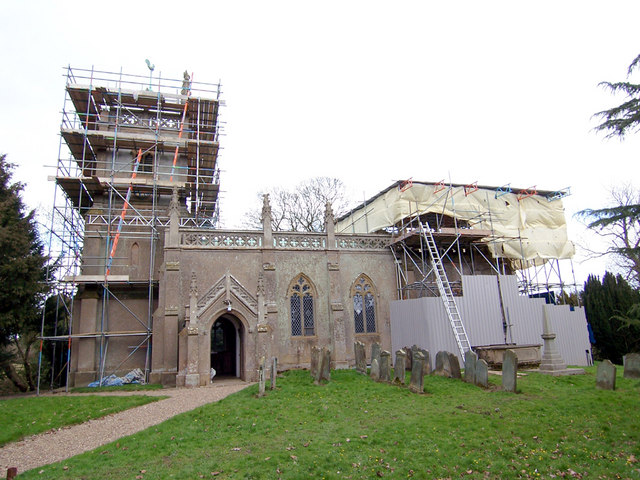
- St Peter's Church undergoing restoration, Raithby cum Maltby

- Location within Lincolnshire
- OS grid reference: TF310847
  - London: 125 mi (201 km) S
- District: East Lindsey
- Shire county: Lincolnshire
- Region: East Midlands
- Country: England
- Sovereign state: United Kingdom
- Post town: Louth
- Postcode district: LN11
- Police: Lincolnshire
- Fire: Lincolnshire
- Ambulance: East Midlands
- UK Parliament: Louth and Horncastle

Raithby cum Maltby is a civil parish in the East Lindsey district of Lincolnshire, England, about 1 mile (1.6 km) south-west from the market town of Louth The parish comprises the hamlets of Raithby and Maltby, and is situated in the Lincolnshire Wolds, an Area of Outstanding Natural Beauty.

The Grade II listed parish church at Raithby is dedicated to St Peter and dates from the late 13th century, although it was rebuilt in rendered brick in 1839 by W. A. Nicholson, paid for by Revd Henry Chaplin. It includes a late-13th-century north arcade, a 15th-century font, and some 16th-century imported glass. The chancel was restored in 1883 by C. H. Fowler.
