= Wispington =

Village in Lincolnshire, England

Coordinates: 53.229255°N 0.195475°W

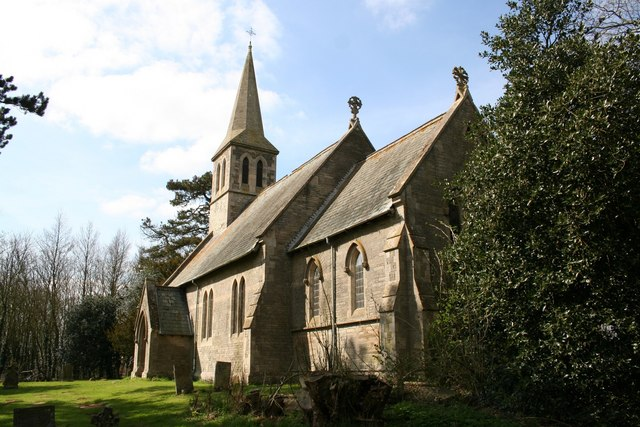
- St Margaret's Church, Wispington

- Location within Lincolnshire
- OS grid reference: TF205717
  - London: 120 mi (190 km) S
- Civil parish: Edlington with Wispington
- District: East Lindsey
- Shire county: Lincolnshire
- Region: East Midlands
- Country: England
- Sovereign state: United Kingdom
- Post town: Horncastle
- Postcode district: LN9
- Police: Lincolnshire
- Fire: Lincolnshire
- Ambulance: East Midlands
- UK Parliament: Louth and Horncastle (UK Parliament constituency)

Wispington is a village in the civil parish of Edlington with Wispington, in East Lindsey, Lincolnshire, England. It is situated 2 miles (3 km) west from the A158 road, and 4 miles (6 km) north-west from Horncastle and 14 miles (23 km) east from the county town. In 1971 the parish had a population of 37. On 1 April 1987 the parish was abolished and merged with Edlington to form "Edlington with Wispington".

The former parish church, a Grade II listed building dedicated to Saint Margaret, was built in 1863 by John Atkinson of York and consists of a western tower, nave, chancel, south porch and vestry. It is constructed of grey sandstone. Inside, the font, pulpit and a relief of St Margaret were carved in stone by the vicar, Rev Charles Pratt Terrot. Monuments are dedicated to the Philips family, one dated 1715, the other 1720. This family lived at Hall Farm, Wispington during late 16th to early 17th century. The church was declared redundant by the Diocese of Lincoln in 1975, and is closed.
