= Ailby =

Hamlet in the East Lindsey district of Lincolnshire, England

Coordinates: 53.269260°N 0.153055°E

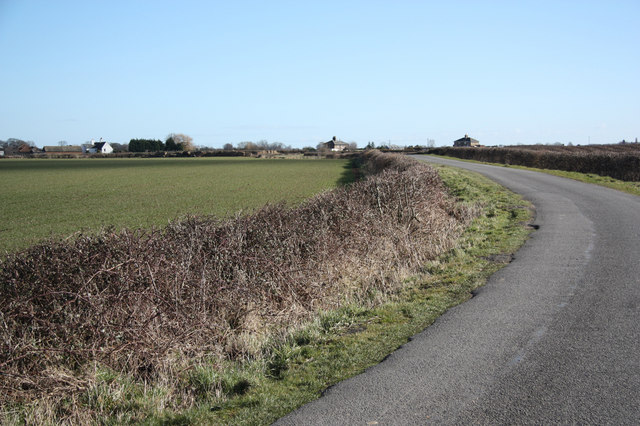
- Ailby

- Location within Lincolnshire
- OS grid reference: TF436768
  - London: 120 mi (190 km) S
- Civil parish: Rigsby with Ailby
- District: East Lindsey
- Shire county: Lincolnshire
- Region: East Midlands
- Country: England
- Sovereign state: United Kingdom
- Post town: Alford
- Postcode district: LN13
- Police: Lincolnshire
- Fire: Lincolnshire
- Ambulance: East Midlands
- UK Parliament: Louth and Horncastle

Ailby is a hamlet in the East Lindsey district of Lincolnshire, England. It is situated less than 1 mile (1.6 km) north-west from Alford, and forms part of the civil parish of Rigsby with Ailby. The village does not possess a place name sign, and its only service is a small garden centre and a livery yard.

The ecclesiastical parish is Rigsby with Ailsby, part of the Alford Group of the Deanery of Calcewaithe & Candleshoe. The parish church is St James at Rigsby.

== DMV ==
The village is mentioned in the 1086 Domesday Book as "Halebi", consisting of 8 households.

The hamlet appears to be the Deserted Medieval Village of Ailby, located to the south of the present Ailby Hall Farm.
