= Creeton =

Hamlet in Lincolnshire, England

Coordinates: 52.765995°N 0.50349°W

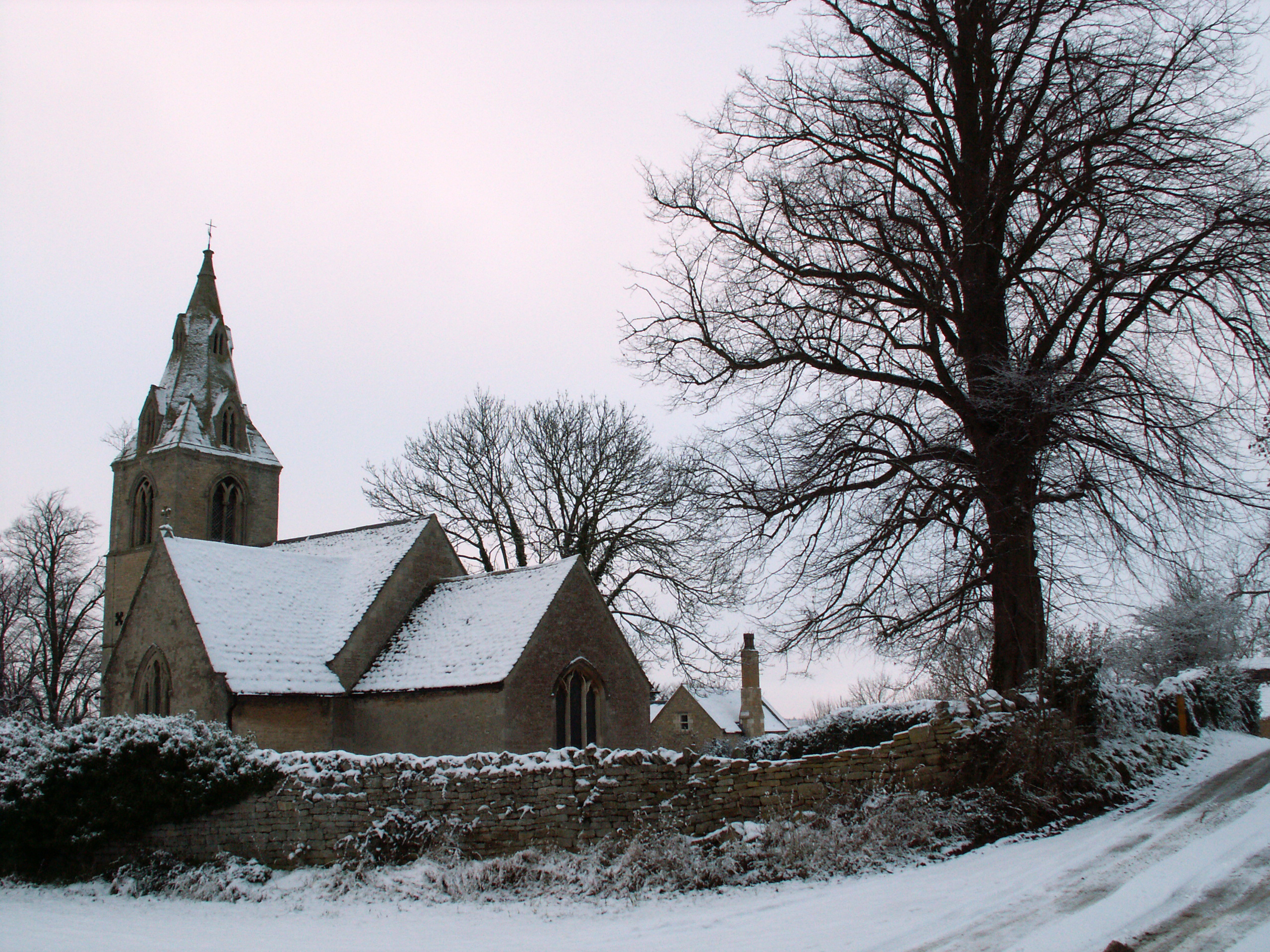
- Church of St Peter, Creeton

- Location within Lincolnshire
- OS grid reference: TF010197
  - London: 85 mi (137 km) S
- Civil parish: Counthorpe and Creeton
- District: South Kesteven
- Shire county: Lincolnshire
- Region: East Midlands
- Country: England
- Sovereign state: United Kingdom
- Post town: Grantham
- Postcode district: NG33
- Police: Lincolnshire
- Fire: Lincolnshire
- Ambulance: East Midlands
- UK Parliament: Grantham and Stamford

Creeton is a village in the civil parish of Counthorpe and Creeton in the South Kesteven district of Lincolnshire, England. It is situated 3 miles (5 km) south west from Bourne and 3 miles (4.8 km) south from Corby Glen, on the River Glen. In 1921 the parish had a population of 72. On 1 April 1931 the parish was abolished and merged with Counthorpe to form "Counthorpe and Creeton".

Creeton Grade I listed Anglican parish church is dedicated to St Peter. It is of late Decorated style. During restoration in 1851 the piers and arches of a former Norman aisle were discovered. The church holds a chained 1611 bible. In the churchyard are two examples of Saxon grave crosses, and 20 stone coffins considered to mark the interment of Cistercian monks of Vallis Dei abbey in the neighbouring Edenham parish.

There are no amenities in Creeton; the nearest school is in Little Bytham, with shops in Corby Glen, Little Bytham and Castle Bytham, and a public house in Swinstead. The hamlet consists of approximately 20 households.

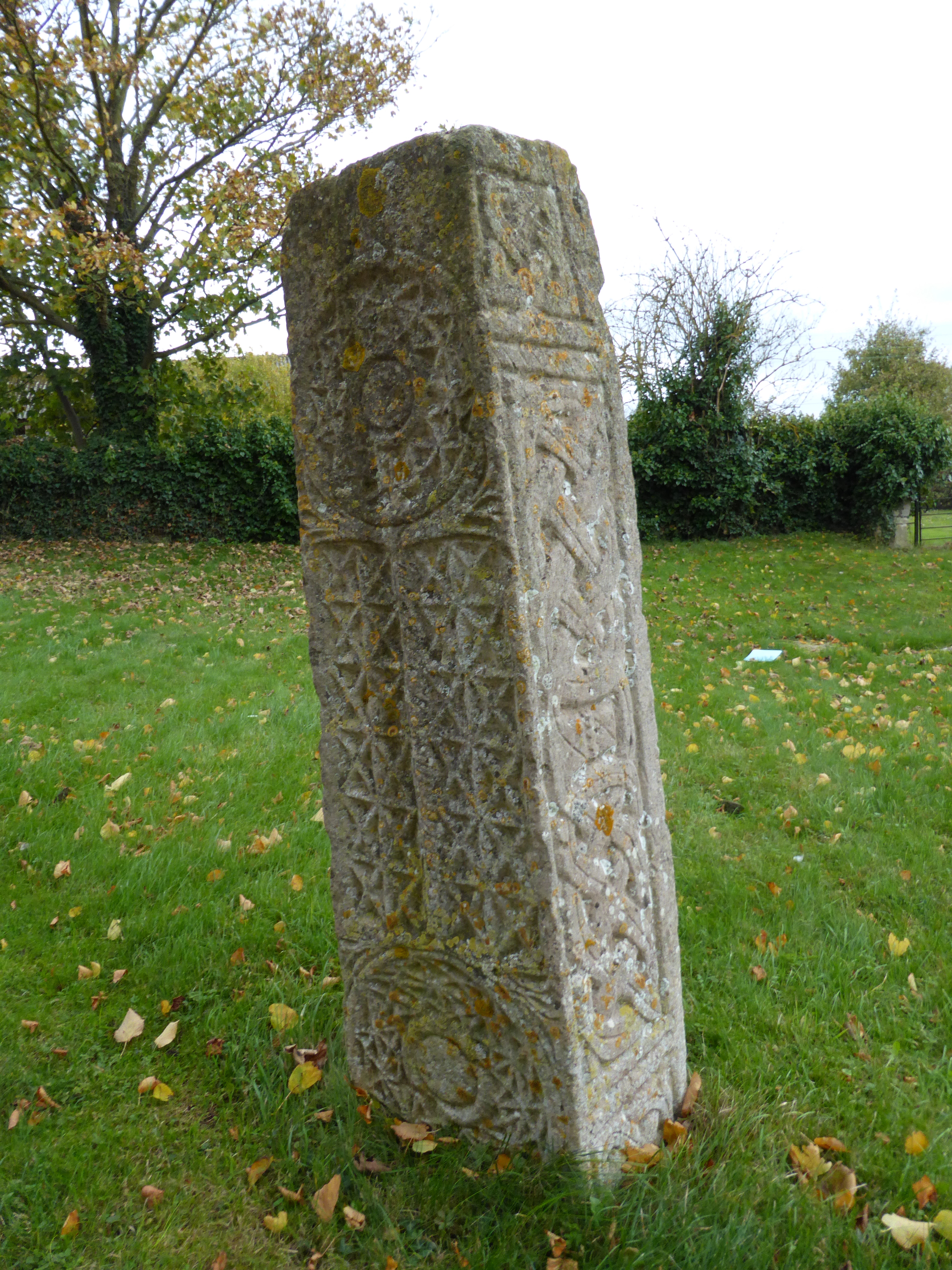
Saxon stone.

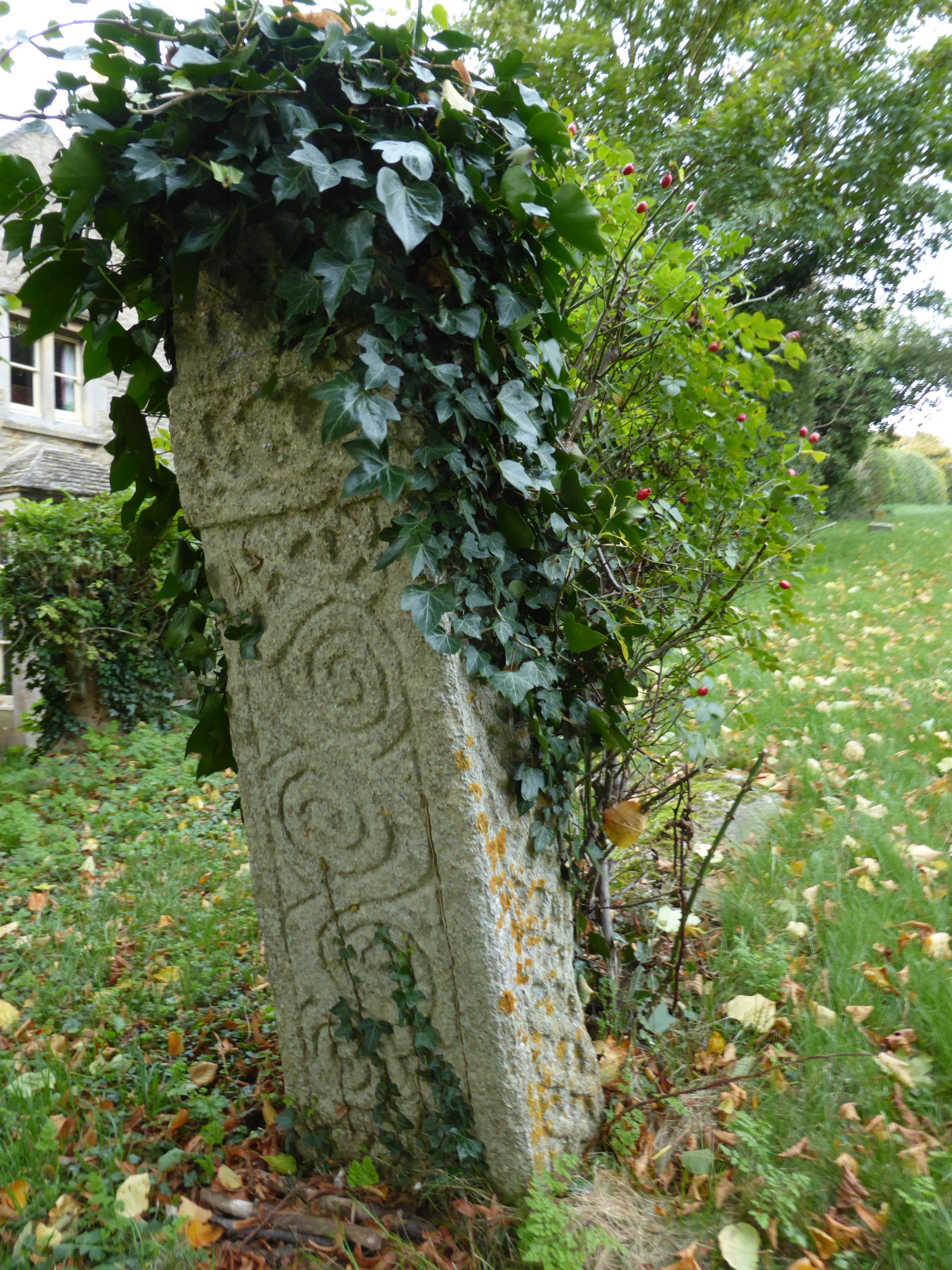
Saxon stone.
