= Edlington, Lincolnshire =

Village in the East Lindsey district of Lincolnshire, England

Coordinates: 53.226°N 0.154°W

Edlington
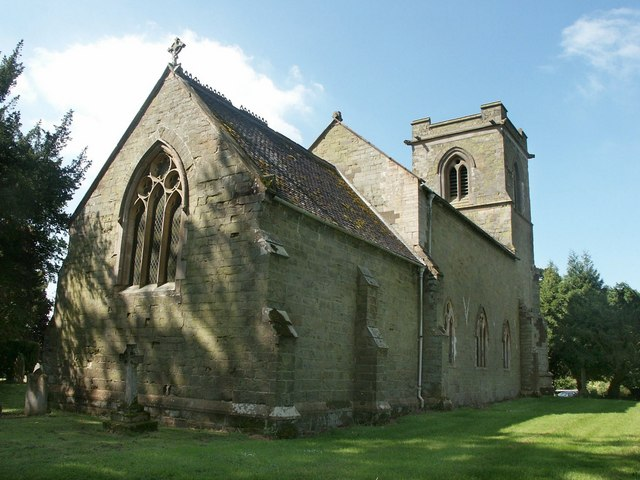
- Church of St Helen, Edlington

- Location within Lincolnshire
- OS grid reference: TF2371
  - London: 120 mi (190 km) S
- Civil parish: Edlington with Wispington
- District: East Lindsey
- Shire county: Lincolnshire
- Region: East Midlands
- Country: England
- Sovereign state: United Kingdom
- Post town: HORNCASTLE
- Postcode district: LN9
- Dialling code: 01507
- Police: Lincolnshire
- Fire: Lincolnshire
- Ambulance: East Midlands

Edlington is a village in the civil parish of Edlington with Wispington, in the East Lindsey district, in the county of Lincolnshire, England. It is situated 2 miles (3.2 km) north-west of Horncastle. In 1961 the parish had a population of 105. On 1 April 1987 the parish was abolished and merged with Wispington to form Edlington with Wispington.

Edlington Grade II listed Anglican parish church is dedicated to St Helen. Originating in the 12th century, it was rebuilt in 1859 by James Fowler, but retained its Norman tower arch and Early English font.

Another listed building is the late 16th-century Hall Farm House.
