= Northorpe, West Lindsey =

Village and civil parish in Lincolnshire, England

Coordinates: 53.463606°N 0.653493°W

Northorpe
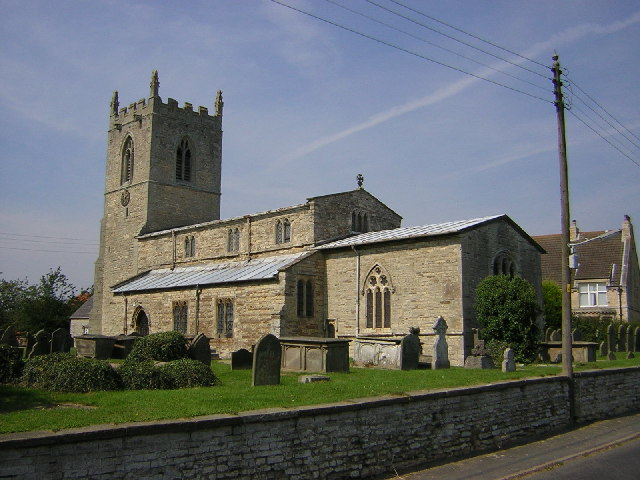
- Church of St John the Baptist, Northorpe

- Location within Lincolnshire
- Population: 126 (2011)
- OS grid reference: SK894971
  - London: 140 mi (230 km) S
- District: West Lindsey
- Shire county: Lincolnshire
- Region: East Midlands
- Country: England
- Sovereign state: United Kingdom
- Post town: Gainsborough
- Postcode district: DN21
- Police: Lincolnshire
- Fire: Lincolnshire
- Ambulance: East Midlands
- UK Parliament: Gainsborough

Northorpe is a village and civil parish in the West Lindsey district of Lincolnshire, England, about 8 miles (13 km) north-east from the town of Gainsborough. The population of the civil parish at the 2011 census was 126.

Today the parish includes the deserted medieval village and former civil parish of Southorpe, whose population declined during the 15th century, and the church, dedicated to Saint Martin, which was pulled down in the early 16th century. Southorpe existed as a separate civil parish from 1858 to 1932, when it was abolished to enlarge that of Northorpe. The site of Southorpe is a scheduled monument.

It is possible both villages existed at the time of the Domesday Book of 1086, as the village of "Torp" is listed five times, and includes a total population of 40 households.

The parish church is dedicated to Saint John the Baptist and is a Grade I listed building built of limestone and dating from the 12th century, with later additions and a restoration of 1905. There are several 17th-century monuments in the church to the Monson family.

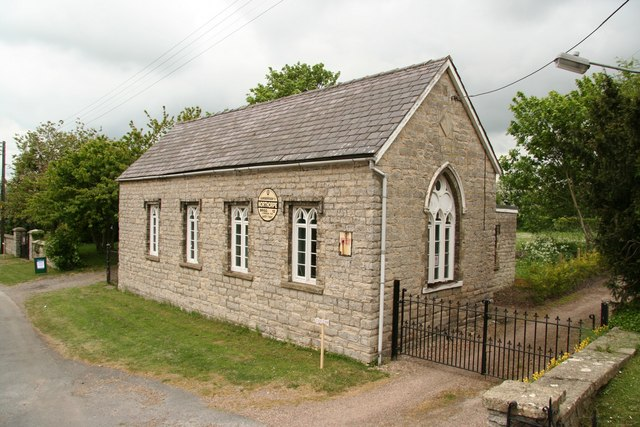
Northorpe school - now the village hall

At one time the churchyard was said to be haunted by an example of the Black Dog apparition, by the name of the Bargest.

Northorpe village hall is a Grade II listed former National school with datestone of 1846. It opened as a school in 1848 and closed in 1932 as Northorpe CE School.

Northorpe railway station opened in 1848 and closed in 1964.

Northorpe has two Halls: the timber-framed Northorpe Old Hall is a Grade II listed ruin dating from the 16th century, and Northorpe Hall is a Grade II listed limestone and yellow brick built house dating from 1872.

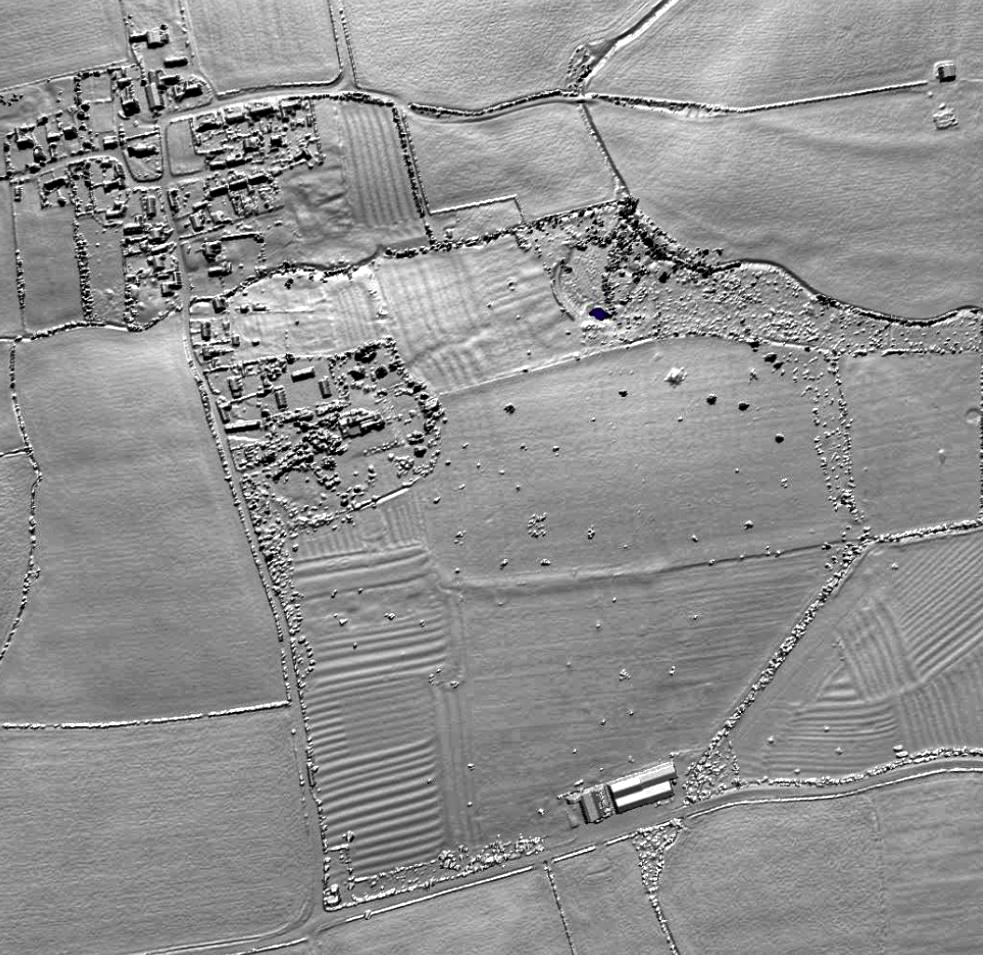
A lidar view of Northorpe
