= Ealand =

Village in Lincolnshire, England

Coordinates: 53.592405°N 0.818965°W

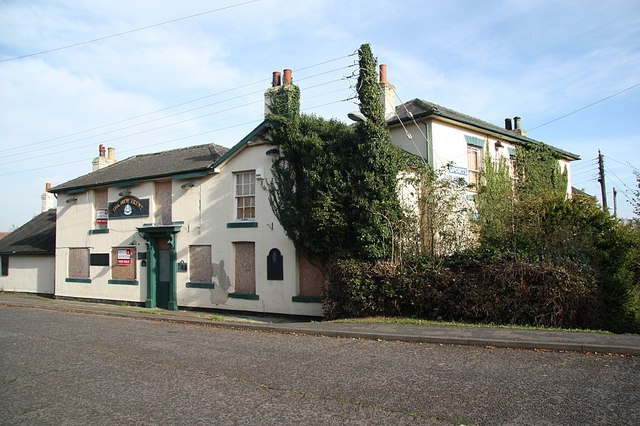
- The disused New Trent Inn, Ealand

- Location within Lincolnshire
- Population: 4,828 (2011 census)
- OS grid reference: SE782112
  - London: 145 mi (233 km) S
- Civil parish: Crowle and Ealand
- Unitary authority: North Lincolnshire
- Ceremonial county: Lincolnshire
- Region: Yorkshire and the Humber
- Country: England
- Sovereign state: United Kingdom
- Post town: Scunthorpe
- Postcode district: DN17
- Police: Humberside
- Fire: Humberside
- Ambulance: East Midlands
- UK Parliament: Doncaster East and the Isle of Axholme

Ealand is a small village in the civil parish of Crowle and Ealand, in the North Lincolnshire district, in the county of Lincolnshire, England. It is situated within the Isle of Axholme, 1 mile (1.6 km) south-east from Crowle (where the 2011 census population is included now called Crowle and Ealand), and 0.5 miles (0.8 km) north from the junction between the A161 and the A18 roads.

The Stainforth and Keadby Canal and Crowle railway station are at the southern edge of Ealand. The A161, which previously ran through the village, has been diverted, and uses a new bridge over the parallel railway line and canal.

Ealand has a Primitive Methodist chapel, a war memorial, and the disused building of the previous New Trent Inn. It has two Grade II listed buildings, an early to mid-18th-century house on Ealand Outgate and early 19th-century Curlews farmhouse on the A161.

Immediately to the west of the A161 is Seven Lakes Leisure Park, sited on clay pits of the former Crowle Brickworks.
