= Kettlethorpe, Lincolnshire =

Village and civil parish in the West Lindsey district of Lincolnshire, England

Coordinates: 53.272800°N 0.731023°W

Kettlethorpe
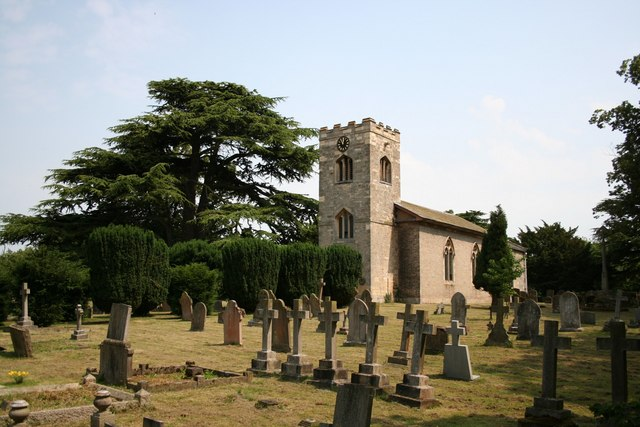
- Church of Saints Peter and Paul, Kettlethorpe

- Location within Lincolnshire
- Population: 426 (2011)
- OS grid reference: SK847758
  - London: 125 mi (201 km) S
- District: West Lindsey
- Shire county: Lincolnshire
- Region: East Midlands
- Country: England
- Sovereign state: United Kingdom
- Post town: Lincoln
- Postcode district: LN1
- Police: Lincolnshire
- Fire: Lincolnshire
- Ambulance: East Midlands
- UK Parliament: Gainsborough

Kettlethorpe is a village and civil parish in the West Lindsey district of Lincolnshire, England. It is situated 10 miles (16 km) west of Lincoln. The villages of Drinsey Nook and Laughterton lie within Kettlethorpe parish. The population of the civil parish taken at the 2011 census was 426.

== Church ==
Kettlethorpe parish church is dedicated to Saint Peter and Saint Paul and is a Grade II listed building dating from the 15th century with alterations in 1809 and the late 19th century, built of yellow brick, and limestone. In the north wall of the sanctuary is a square stone wall plaque to John Reeke, rector (died 1597). Also in the sanctuary on the south wall is an oval marble wall plaque to Rev. Hugh Palmer (died 1799). On the north wall is a larger marble wall plaque to Charles Hall (died 1743). In the north aisle is a plaque to the Cole family, dated late 18th-century. At the west end of the nave are painted royal arms and round the side walls of the nave are 19th-century texts in red lettering. In the churchyard are the remains of a cross, dating from the 14th century with 19th-century restoration.

The ecclesiastical parish is Kettlethorpe with Fenton, part of the Saxilby Group of the Deanery of Corringham. The parish church is in Kettlethorpe.

== Kettlethorpe Manor or Hall ==
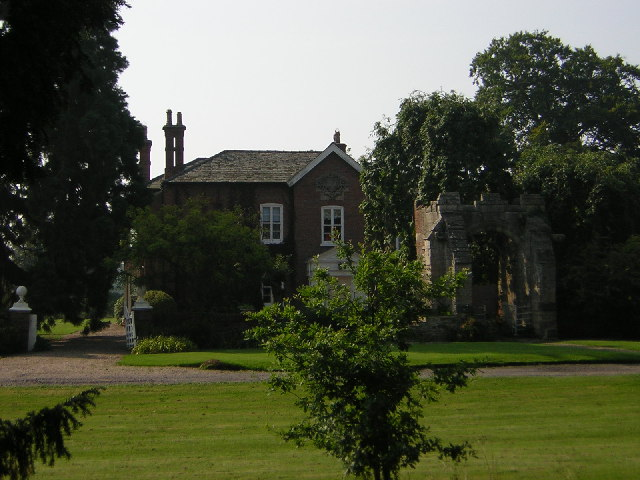
Kettlethorpe Hall

The moat surrounding Kettlethorpe Hall survives in part on all four sides of a rectangle and presumably is the remnant of the manor later held by the Swynford family in the 14th and 15th centuries, including Katherine Swynford, subsequent third wife of John of Gaunt, and Duchess of Lancaster.

Today the Hall is a small country house, dating from the early 18th century built by the M.P. Charles Hall who succeeded to the house in 1713. It then passed to the Amcotts family. It was altered and extended in the 19th century. It is Grade II listed. A gateway to the Hall, dating from the 14th century with 18th-century additions and alterations, is Grade II* listed.

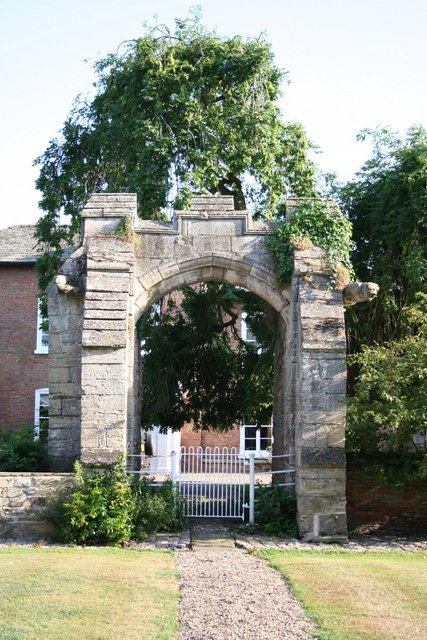
14th-century gateway to Kettlethorpe Hall

There are earthwork remains of a medieval deer park, enclosed about 1383 and dis-parked around 1830. In 1383 Katherine Swynford received a licence from King Richard II to enclose land and establish a park of 300 acres (1.2 km^{2}) within her manor of Kettlethorpe.

== Laughterton ==
The settlement of Laughterton looks like a planned village, with properties of approximately equal depth on either side of a straight north–south street. Laughterton is always recorded with Kettlethorpe in tax returns. Millfield Golf Course is in Laughterton.
