= Fenton, West Lindsey =

Village and civil parish in the West Lindsey district of Lincolnshire, England

Coordinates: 53.280952°N 0.735353°W

Fenton
- Village and civil parish
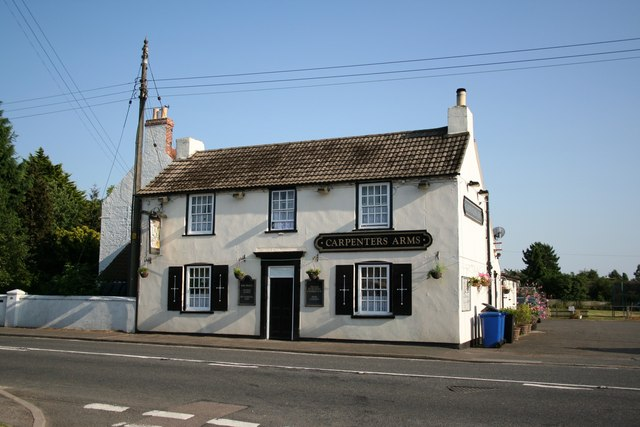
- The Carpenters arms, Fenton

- Location within Lincolnshire
- Population: 297 (2001)
- OS grid reference: SK844767
  - London: 125 mi (201 km) S
- District: West Lindsey
- Shire county: Lincolnshire
- Region: East Midlands
- Country: England
- Sovereign state: United Kingdom
- Post town: Lincoln
- Postcode district: LN1
- Police: Lincolnshire
- Fire: Lincolnshire
- Ambulance: East Midlands
- UK Parliament: Gainsborough

Fenton is a village and civil parish in the West Lindsey district of Lincolnshire, England. It is situated 9 mi (14 km) north-west of Lincoln and 4 miles (6.4 km) west from Saxilby. The population of the civil parish was 297 at the 2001 census, increasing to 353 at the 2011 census.

Fenton is a centre for the breeding of a local cattle variety, the Lincoln Reds.

The ecclesiastical parish is Kettlethorpe with Fenton, part of the Saxilby Group of the Deanery of Corringham. The parish church is in the smaller village of Kettlethorpe 0.5 miles (0.8 km) to the south.

The village public house is the Carpenters Arms.
