= Legsby =

Village in Lincolnshire, England

Coordinates: 53.355671°N 0.291743°W

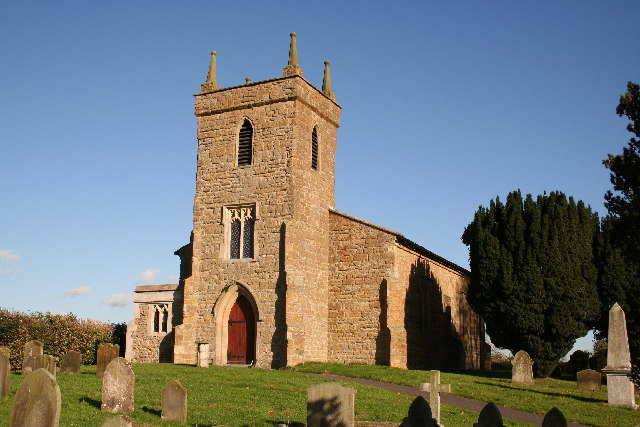
- Church of St Thomas, Legsby

- Location within Lincolnshire
- Population: 193 (2011)
- OS grid reference: TF137856
  - London: 125 mi (201 km) S
- District: West Lindsey
- Shire county: Lincolnshire
- Region: East Midlands
- Country: England
- Sovereign state: United Kingdom
- Post town: MARKET RASEN
- Postcode district: LN8
- Police: Lincolnshire
- Fire: Lincolnshire
- Ambulance: East Midlands
- UK Parliament: Gainsborough

Legsby (otherwise Legesby) is a small village and civil parish in the West Lindsey district of Lincolnshire, England. The population of the civil parish at the 2011 census was 193. It is situated approximately 13 miles (20 km) north-east from the city of Lincoln and 3 miles (5 km) south-east from the town of Market Rasen.

The parish includes the settlements of Bleasby, Bleasby Moor, Collow, and East Torrington.

== History ==
In the Domesday account Legsby is recorded as "Lagesbi". It consisted of 6 villagers and 1 smallholder, 2 ploughlands, a meadow and woodland of 12 acres (0.049 km^{2}) each and a mill. In 1066 Alsi son of Godram held the lordship of the manor, transferred to Everard of Leathley in 1086, with Tenant-in-Chief becoming William of Percy. Domesday notes a now nonexistent village of Holtham in Legsby, named "Houten", 1,400 yards (1,280 m) to the east, with 4 villagers, 2 smallholders, 6 freemen, 2 ploughlands, a 30-acre meadow, and lord and tenantship as Legsby. Bleasby, "Belesbi", contained 2 villagers, 2 smallholders and 2 freemen, with 3 ploughlands, a meadow and woodland of 120 acres (0.49 km^{2}) each, and Aghmund son of Walraven as lord in 1066, becoming Herman, with Tenant-in Chief as Jocelyn son of Lambert, in 1086.

To the north and south of St Thomas' church are earthworks and a hollow way, indicating Legsby medieval village. By 1187 the village and church had been granted to the Gilbertine priory of Sixhills. At the 1541 Suppression Legsby manor was given to Charles Brandon, Duke of Suffolk, who sold it the same year. The estate was later bought by Richard Nelthorpe, and it remained in the Nettlethorpe family until the early 20th century.

Bleasby, less than 1 mile (1.6 km) to the south, is the site of a deserted medieval village and manor house, defined by moat, croft, field and pond earthworks. Pevsner saw the moat as "surprisingly small but quite unmistakable". A windmill mound, The Mount, 0.5 miles (0.8 km) south of Bleasby at the end of Mount Lane, and now covered by trees, is the site of Bleasby Mill, documented in the 13th century. The mound probably existed before the 12th century establishment of the adjacent Collow township.

The settlement remains of the Legsby hamlet of Holtham, in the 16th century known as Howdome and comprising four families, is defined by crop mark evidence of a moated monastic or manor house, and a ridge and furrow field system. Earthwork remains of a moat, paddocks, ditch, enclosures and trackways were visible in 1846, but were demolished in the 1960s.

Collow, 0.5 miles (0.8 km) north-west from East Torrington, is a possible manorial or medieval site. Machinery finds could indicate a 16th- or 17th-century mill, and moat, pond, ditch, croft and field earthworks of a defensive homestead.

East Torrington, 1.5 miles (2.4 km) south-east of Legsby, contains earthworks adjacent to the north-west of the church, with rectilinear ditches, a hollow way, and ridge and furrow field system, indicating a medieval village. The hamlet was conjoined with West Torrington in the 14th century. The present St Michael's church was designed by Samuel Sanders Teulon, and was built on, or close to, a previous church.

Kelly's 1885 Directory records Major Robert Nassau Sutton JP as lord of the manor, and a principal landowner with Edward Heneage MP, DL, JP. The parish was of 2,835 acres (11.5 km^{2}), with agricultural production comprising wheat, barley, oats and turnips. It held a Wesleyan chapel and a church school for 50 children. There were nine farms, one a Glebe farm, two shoe makers, a blacksmith, shopkeeper and wheelwright. Bleasby hamlet held Methodist and Free Methodist chapels, four farms and a wheelwright, and Collow hamlet, two farms.

=== Church ===
Legsby Grade II listed Anglican church is dedicated to St Thomas. It is originally 13th-century, and of Early English and Tudor styles, and includes a chancel, nave, and obelisk style pinnacled tower containing one bell. A stained glass east window was inserted in memory of a mid-19th-century vicar. Pevsner records that the church was probably altered in the 18th century, with a shortening of the chancel, and has a Norman font, Kelly's giving it Romanesque attribution, and a chalice and paten cover dated 1569. Cox believes that the font and chalice are the only thing of interest in the church.
