= Thornton le Moor, Lincolnshire =

Village in Lincolnshire, England

Coordinates: 53.452418°N 0.419225°W

Thornton le Moor
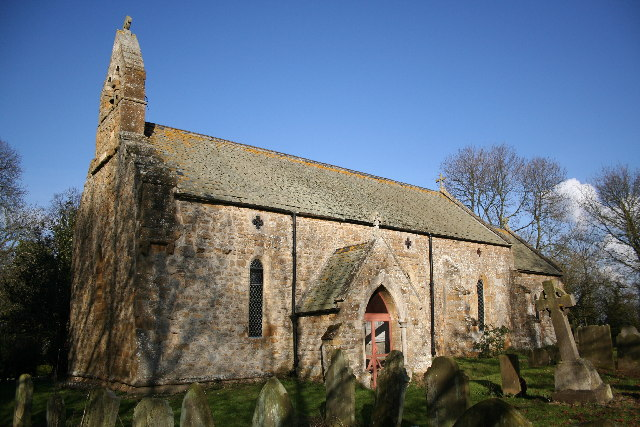
- All Saints' Church, Thornton le Moor

- Location within Lincolnshire
- OS grid reference: TF050962
  - London: 135 mi (217 km) S
- Civil parish: Owersby
- District: West Lindsey
- Shire county: Lincolnshire
- Region: East Midlands
- Country: England
- Sovereign state: United Kingdom
- Post town: Market Rasen
- Postcode district: LN7
- Police: Lincolnshire
- Fire: Lincolnshire
- Ambulance: East Midlands
- UK Parliament: Gainsborough

Thornton le Moor is a village in the civil parish of Owersby, in the West Lindsey district of Lincolnshire, England, situated approximately 5 miles (8 km) south-west from the town of Caistor. In 1931 the parish had a population of 70. On 1 April 1936 the parish was abolished and merged with Owersby.

Near the village are the remains of the deserted medieval villages of Beasthorpe and Cauthorpe. In the Domesday Book of 1086 Thornton le Moor is written as "Torentone", consisting of eighteen households.

The parish church is dedicated to All Saints and is a Grade II* listed ironstone building dating from the 11th century. It was restored 1871. There is a fragment of an 11th-century limestone cross shaft built into the back of an aumbry in the north wall of the chancel.
