= Amber Hill =

Village and civil parish in Lincolnshire, England

Coordinates: 53.006270°N 0.163885°W

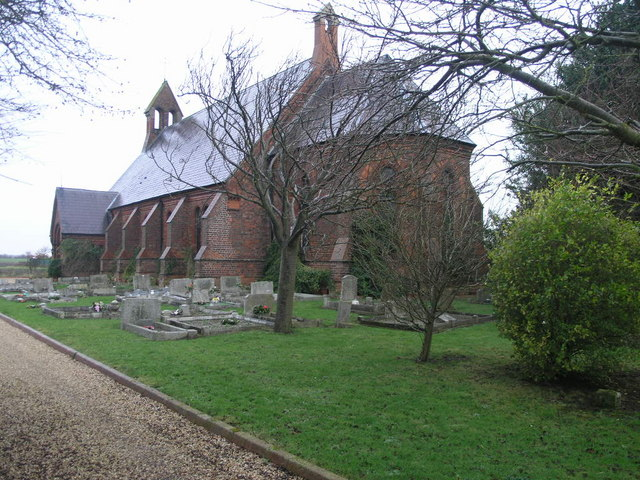
- Church of St John the Baptist, Amber Hill

- Location within Lincolnshire
- Population: 294 (2011)
- OS grid reference: TF233470
  - London: 100 mi (160 km) S
- District: Boston
- Shire county: Lincolnshire
- Region: East Midlands
- Country: England
- Sovereign state: United Kingdom
- Post town: BOSTON
- Postcode district: PE20
- Dialling code: 01205
- Police: Lincolnshire
- Fire: Lincolnshire
- Ambulance: East Midlands
- UK Parliament: Boston and Skegness

Amber Hill is a village and civil parish in Lincolnshire, England, approximately 6 miles (10 km) west-north-west from Boston. The 2001 Census measured its population at 268, increasing to 294 at the 2011 census.

== History and governance ==
The name Amber Hill reputedly comes from the village standing on a seam of amber coloured gravel. Amber Hill was a plot of 30 acres allotted under the Holland Fen Enclosure Award to provide materials for repairing the roads of several parishes having rights of common on Holland Fen. It was formed a civil parish in 1880.

The village is one of eighteen parishes which, together with Boston, form the Borough of Boston. The local government has been arranged in this way since the reorganization of 1 April 1974, which resulted from the Local Government Act 1972. This parish forms part of the Swineshead and Holland Fen electoral ward.

Hitherto, the parish formed part of Boston Rural District, in the Parts of Holland. Holland was one of the three divisions (formally known as parts) of the traditional county of Lincolnshire. Since the Local Government Act 1888, Holland had been, in most respects, a county in itself.

== Landmarks ==
Amber Hill church, dedicated to Saint John the Baptist, was built in 1867 and is a Grade II listed building. It was made redundant in 1995 and sold as a private dwelling house. The graveyard is still public, and interments still take place there.

Amber Hill Tower Mill was one of several pumping windmills once standing in Holland Fen. Late in the 19th century it was converted to steam power and continued to work driven by traction engine and finally by tractor, until about 1960. The engine at Spinney Farm has a brick tower, internal gearing and its scoop wheel (rebuilt 1960), although its cap and sails were removed when it was converted to be driven by steam.

A scoop wheel and channel on Claydike Bank was built in the 19th century of red brick, cast iron, and wood. It was originally belt-driven, and is Grade II listed.

== Amenities ==
Toftstead County Primary School was built in 1881, extended in 1969—at the time of the closure of Hedgehog Bridge at Brothertoft and Barley Sheaf School at Holland Fen—and finally closed in 2010.

Jubilee Park Playing Field children's recreation area was opened in 2005 after five years of planning and fundraising by local people.

== Population ==
Population of Amber Hill Civil Parish
Year	1881	1891	1901	1911	1921	1931	1941	1961	2001
Population	607	562	546	529	502	570	537	430	268
