= Brothertoft =

Village in Lincolnshire, England

Coordinates: 52.997114°N 0.105258°W

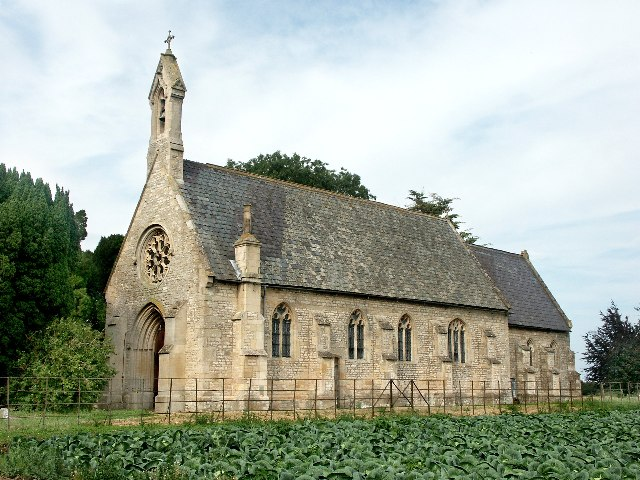
- St Gilbert of Sempringham, Brothertoft

- Location within Lincolnshire
- OS grid reference: TF272461
  - London: 105 mi (169 km) S
- Civil parish: Holland Fen with Brothertoft
- District: Boston
- Shire county: Lincolnshire
- Region: East Midlands
- Country: England
- Sovereign state: United Kingdom
- Post town: BOSTON
- Postcode district: PE20
- Dialling code: 01205
- Police: Lincolnshire
- Fire: Lincolnshire
- Ambulance: East Midlands
- UK Parliament: Boston and Skegness

Brothertoft is a village in the civil parish of Holland Fen with Brothertoft, in the Boston district, in the county of Lincolnshire, England. It is about 4 miles (6.4 km) northwest from the market town of Boston.

== History ==
Evidence has been found that the area now known as Brothertoft was known to the Romano-British people. The site of a possible building was uncovered at Cannons Farm in Punchbowl Lane between 1957 and 1959. A denarius of Septimius Severus was found along with pottery, potsherds, animal bones, ditches and hollows. A Roman vase was dug up about 1970 at a separate site in Brothertoft by Mr Epton.

The hamlet is first recorded some time after 1350 and before 1540. Brothertoft hamlet is mentioned in the Diocesan Return of 1563 (Deanery of Holland, parish of Kirton,) as having ten households. William Marrat, a local historian writing in 1814, noted that the traditional belief for the origins of the village name lay in a grant being awarded to two brothers in order that they could "inclose" (that is, separate and cultivate) the area from the surrounding fenland. The word toft is thought to come from the Danish occupiers of Lincolnshire in ancient times and has the meaning of homestead or enclosure. Hence the place name of Brother-Toft. In an addendum Marrat wrote that the place had been a vaccaria (or vaccary - literally, a cow shed) of the abbey at Swineshead and had once been called Toft because of it relatively raised position above the fens. There are records of receipts which were probably from the area in the Swineshead entries of the Valor Ecclesiasticus. These are not definitive as another historian of the period, Pishey Thompson, pointed out that Toft was used as a name both for Brothertoft and Fishtoft in the late fourteenth century. The raised position did not exclude the area from flooding and, for example, in 1763 the villagers were forced to live in the upper stories of buildings due to the amount of water ingress.

In 1971 the civil parish had a population of 320. Brothertoft was formerly a chapelry in the parish of Kirton, in 1866 Brothertoft became a civil parish, on 1 April 1987 the parish was abolished to form "Holland Fen with Brothertoft".

=== Sempringham Priory ===
While the surrounding land belonged to Swineshead in medieval times, the manor of Brothertoft was worked by the Sempringham Priory. The Gilbertine Order originated in 1131. About that time Gilbert of Sempringham became the rector of the church of Sempringam. He then instituted the rule of St Augustine and many statutes from the customs of Augustinian and Premonstratensian canons. The Valor Ecclesiasticus of 1535 values "Brodertofte" at £9.16s.1d. On 18 September 1538 Brothertoft was surrendered by Robert Holgate, chaplain to Cromwell, with Roger the Prior (Prior of 1538) and 16 canons as part of the dissolution of the monasteries.

=== Carre family of Sleaford ===
By 1553 Robert Carre (sometimes spelled Carr) of Sleaford owned the manor of Brothertoft, which was left to his cousin Robert Carre. Robert Carre, cousin to Robert Carre, lived at the old Carre House at Sleaford. He died in 1590.

Sir Edward Carre, 1st Baronet of Sleaford, was the owner in 1614 at which time his Brothertoft tenants were charged with the diking of part of South Ea as commoners in Holland fen. Edward was married twice and had three issue from his second marriage to Anne Dyer: Rochester, Sir Robert and Lucy. He resided at old Hall at Dunsby and died in 1618. Sir Robert Carr, son of Edward and 2nd Baronet of Sleaford, and Lady Ann Carr were owners of Brothertoft in 1619. Lady Ann was likely Robert's mother, Ann Dyer Carre.

Lucy Carre, daughter of Sir Robert Carre (died 1667) and "the Lady Mary Carre, daughter of Sir Richard Gargrave, married Sir Francis Holles (1627–89), later 2nd Lord of Holles (also spelled Hollis) in Westminster Abbey. Following Robert Carre's death, Francis Holles successfully secured for Lucy a good portion of Robert Carre's estates, although Brothertoft is not specifically named.

=== Holles family ===
The son of Francis Holles, Denzil, was initially the heir of Francis but died within two years of his father, and the land passed to his cousin John Holles, first Duke of Newcastle. Upon his death in 1711, much of his estate passed to his nephew, Thomas Pelham-Holles, who also became Duke of Newcastle.

=== Charles Frederick ===
Brothertoft manor was next owned by Sir Charles Frederick Who bought it from Thomas Pelham-Holles, Duke of Newcastle and Katherine Pelham, widow of Henry Pelham in 1761. Frederick died in December 1785, and his son Thomas Lenox Frederick sold it to John Cartwright, Esquire. Cartwright did not purchase the land until 1788.

=== Holland Fen riot ===
Prior to Frederick, the fenland often flooded to the point where boats had to be used for transport, and it was during his time at Brothertoft that drainage, and then enclosure began. Around 1767 the inhabitants of Brothertoft, who occupied 52 houses in the hamlet, were "most active" in rioting as a protest against the enclosure of Holland Fen. They regarded this land as being for their pleasure and sustenance, and in particular as a location for fishing and fowling. Aside from general rioting and the removal of recently erected fencing, up to 200 people also played football on the land in an attempt to assert their historic rights, forcing Frederick to send men to guard the area. The situation led to serious injury and deaths, including the loss of an eye by a Captain Wilks who had been employed by Frederick to command the guard and who was shot. This common land had also traditionally been the scene of an annual fair, called the Toft drift, lasting a week from 8 July and attracting visitors from nearby villages and from Boston.

== Buildings ==
=== Hall ===
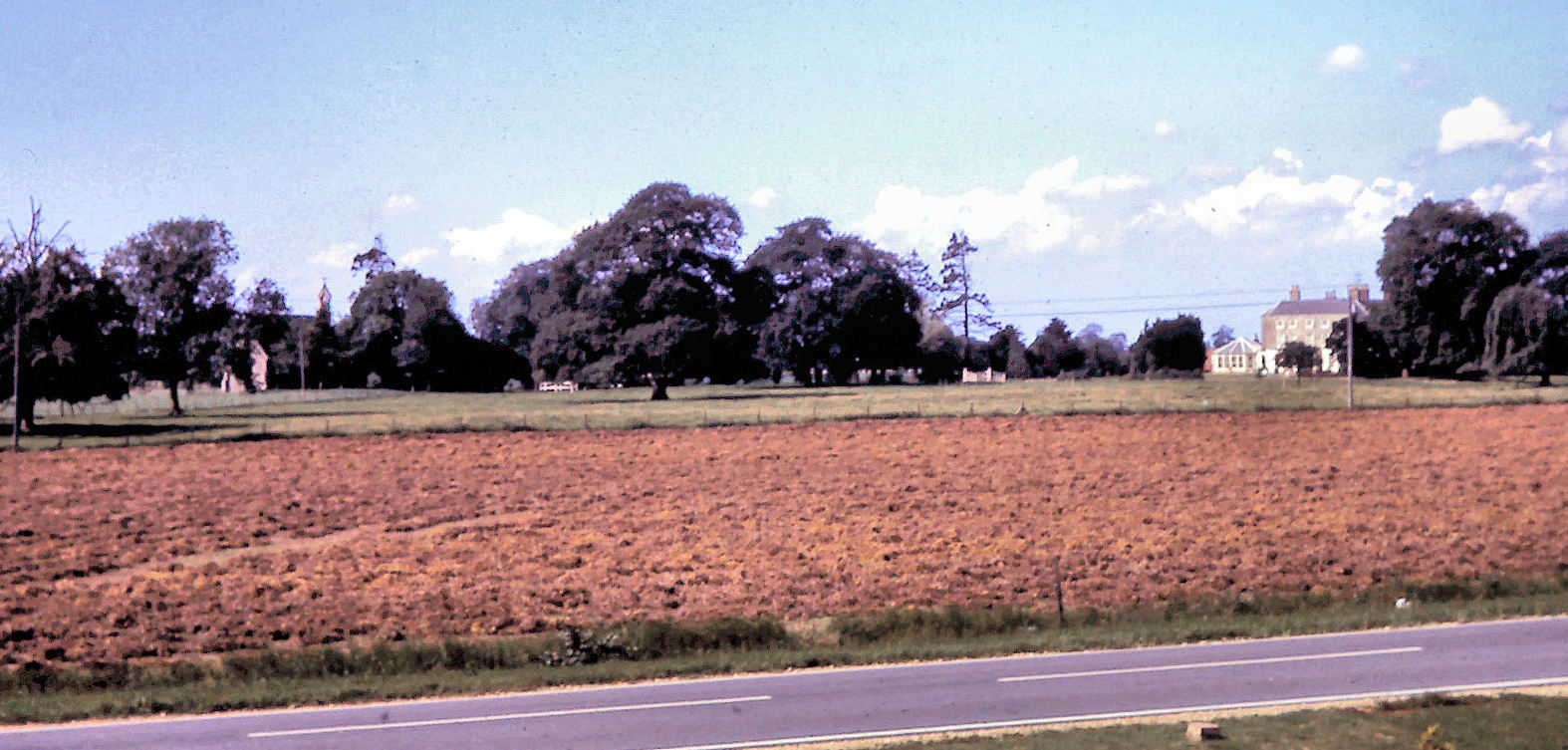
Brothertoft Church Hall and Park circa 1975

In 1788 the land was bought by Major John Cartwright, the political reformer. He sold his estate at Marnham, Nottinghamshire soon after and by the time he leased the estate and moved to Enfield, Middlesex in 1803 or 1805 had developed the rich loam soil into a profitable site for the cultivation of woad, assisted by new machinery, some of his own invention and some developed by his bailiff and later steward William Amos He began addressing his letters as being from Brothertoft Farm.

At this time there was a building called Brothertoft Hall or Brothertoft house, to which the farm was an ancillary. Cartwright had extended Brothertoft house with octagonal additions to both ends and had also applied a stucco finish to the walls. Marrat described it as "an elegant mansion". He claims that it was originally built by Thomas Saul, founder of the Baptist chapel in Boston. Pishey Thompson believed the founder of the Boston chapel to be John Saul.

Brothertoft Farm was extended in the early 19th century by Thomas Gee, a son of Henry Gee, a banker of Boston. Marrat recounted in 1814 that Cartwright had sold off much of the land as separate farms, that the holding had consisted of around 880 acres (360 ha) and that the principal owners then had been Gee, T C Gerordot, C Dashwood, G Beedham and John Burrell. Cartwright had married the eldest daughter of Samuel Dashwood in 1780. The lands had a rateable value of £790 4s. 0d. in 1831–1832, with the "extra-parochial Pelham's Lands" being valued at £518 7s. 7d. (Pelham's Lands was near Fosdyke and by the 1870s comprised seven houses and a population of 54). At this time the area was a part of the Kirton Hundred or Wapentake, which itself had a total rateable value of £51,469 15s. 8d. By the mid-1850s there were 123 inhabitants and the lands consisted of 900 acres (360 ha), with the principal owners being Gee, Herbert Ingram, Henry Rogers, George Cartwright and Mrs Barnsdale. A Mary Beedham, only child of George Beedham, had married a Mr Barnsdale of Brothertoft at Boston around June 1811.

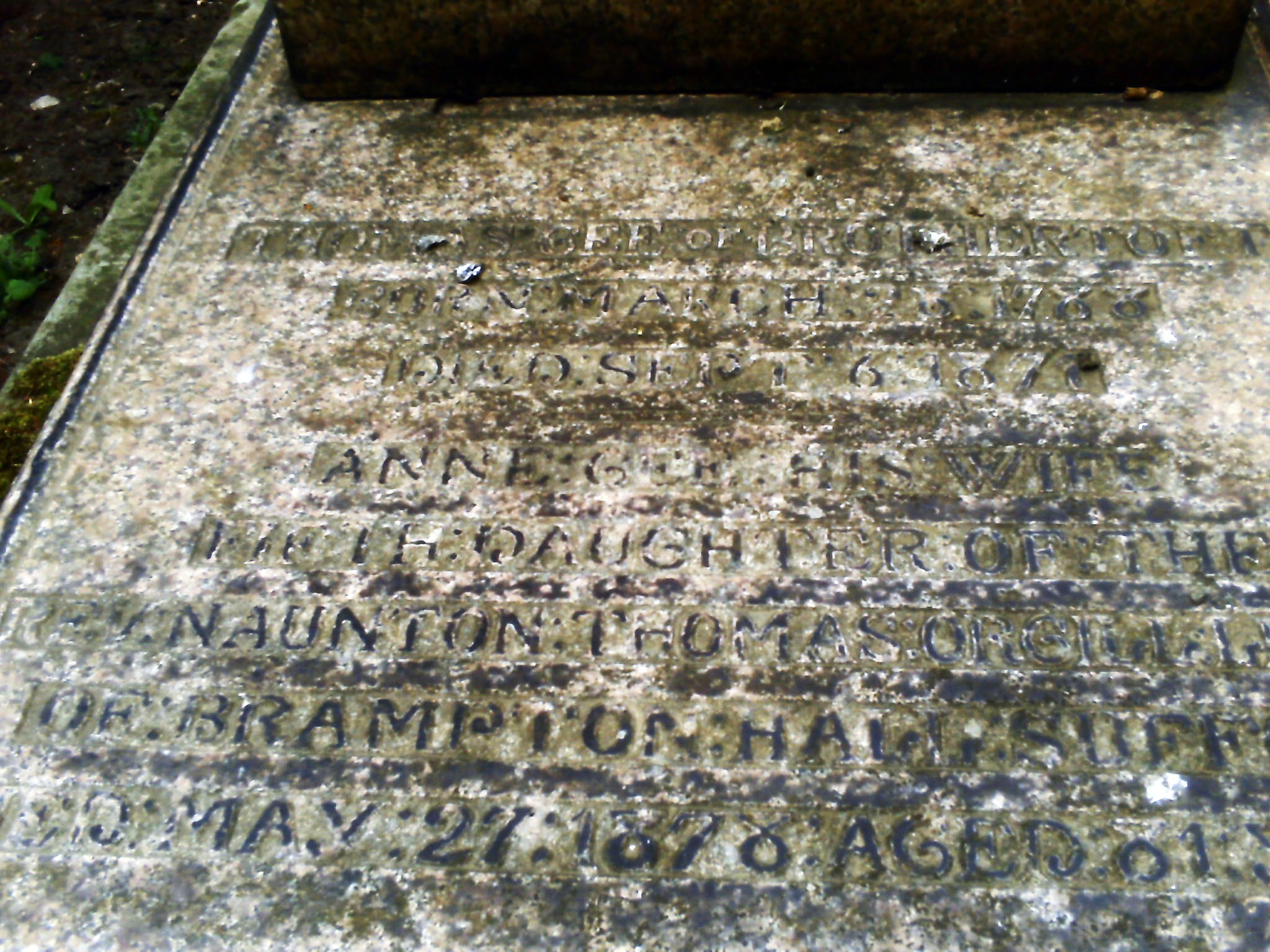
The gravestone of Thomas and Anne Gee at Brothertoft. (Note: The inscription on the gravestone of Thomas and Anne Gee pictured reads: Thomas : Gee of Brothertoft Born : March : 26 : 1788 Died : Sept : 6 : 1871 Anne : Gee: his : wife 1797 the : daughter : of : the R.e.v : Naunton : Thomas : Orgill : Leman of : Brampton : Hall : Suffolk died : May; 27 : 1878 : aged : 81 : years)

Thomas Gee died in 1871, leaving his wife, Ann Leman Gee, as occupant of the Hall until her death in 1878. They are both buried at Brothertoft. The Hall was subsequently occupied in turn by Frederick Curtois, Charles James Small, Henry Peart, and Ebenezer Larrington, It is still occupied today. Brothertoft Hall, built around 1780 and substantially extended about 1850, is now a Grade II listed building.

=== Church ===
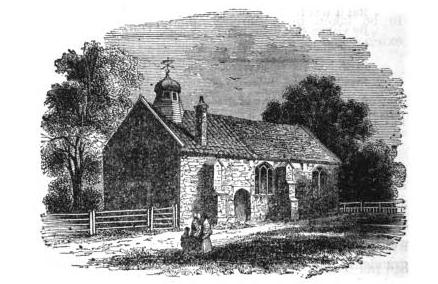
Brothertoft chapel c 1843

The church, which is dedicated to St Gilbert of Sempringham, was a part of the chapelry of Kirton around 1837 and was owned by the lord of the manor, it being at that time a chapel of ease.

History

The Lincoln Diocesan Record Office holds registers baptisms, marriage and burials for the church going back to 1682.

Marrat was of the opinion that the building was not particularly old, being built of brick and roofed with flat tiles, and that the Saxon window arches were the exception and perhaps indicated an earlier use for the building. He noted that the oldest register was from 1757. However, he subsequently amended his writings on the basis of new information which indicated a construction date around 1600 using materials from a chapel at Coningsby. Lewin also noted that he had seen registers, or perhaps copies of them, for as far back as 1682.

A former monk of Bardney, Otto Buttolle, was curate of Brothertoft in 1554, long before the surviving church records and when the living had an annual stipend of £3 6s. 8d. (He also had an annual pension of £5 under the terms agreed following the dissolution of the monasteries). William Scoffin was curate from around 1683 until his ejection as a consequence of the Bartholomew Act in August 1686. He went on to minister a presbyterian congregation in Sleaford. A later holder of the living was William Tyler, rector and stepfather to Ann Chappell. Chappell married the navigator and cartographer Matthew Flinders in April 1801.

The church was dedicated as a parish church in 1922. Five years later, in 1927 parts of the parishes of Holland Fen, Boston, Wyberton, Frampton, Kirton, Swineshead, Wigtoft, and extra-parochial land were transferred to the benefice of Brothertoft.

Buildings

Stephen Lewin described the church in 1843 as

The west end ... has a low door with pointed Tudor arch; above this is a window of two lights with circular arches without tracery; the south wall is pierced with a door, a window of three lights and a window of two lights without tracery; the north wall has in it two windows of three lights with trefoiled tracery and the east end has a window similar to these. At the apex of the roof at the west end is an octagonal turret, constructed of wood containing one bell with the date 1721.

Rebuilt between 1847 and 1854 to a design by Lewin, the church is a Grade II listed building and has a small bell tower.

In 1922, when St Gilbert's was dedicated as a parish church, the building of the rectory house was completed.

=== School ===
Some form of provision for education existed in the mid-1700s as this is when an "obscure poet", William Hall, was taught in Brothertoft for a period of six months. Thomas Gee erected a school at Brothertoft in 1856. In 1879 the North East Holland Fen United District School Board was formed, and on 4 April 1881 the newly built Hedgehog Bridge School opened on the North Forty Foot Bank, and children were schooled there until it closed in December 1969. The Misses Gee, sisters of Thomas Gee, opened the Boston Middle Girls School in Boston, which became the Conway School and is now the Excell International School.

== Religion ==
=== Brothertoft Group ===
The parish church is now part of the Church of England "Brothertoft Group" in the Diocese of Lincoln, known as the "Five in the Fen" that also includes:

- All Saints at Holland Fen
- Christ Church at Kirton Holme
- St Peter at Wildmore
- St Margaret of Scotland at Langrick

=== Baptist ===
There were prayer meetings being held by a group of Baptists in Brothertoft in 1813. These people raised a subscription for a Mission in India.

== Demographics ==
Population of Brothertoft Civil Parish, 1871–1961
Year	1871	1881	1891	1901	1911	1921	1931	1951	1961
Population	293	253	235	226	408	405	396	479	407
Area (acres)	-	1,805	1,835	1,835	2,194	2,194	2,194	3,826	3,826
Houses	-	54	51	49	-	93	102	144	133

The above table contents are based on official census data and are not comparable to the figures referred to earlier in the text. The Civil Parish gained a part of Fosdyke in 1880, parts of Frampton, Kirton and Wyberton in 1906, and parts of Boston and Langriville in 1932.
