= Langrick Bridge =

Village in the civil parish of Holland Fen with Brothertoft in Lincolnshire, England

Coordinates: 53.0102°N 0.11471°W

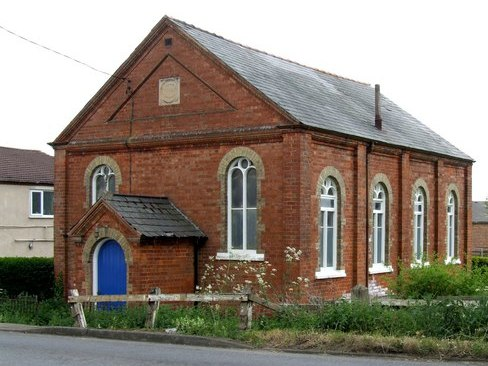
- Former Methodist Chapel at Langrick Bridge

- Location within Lincolnshire
- OS grid reference: TF265475
  - London: 105 mi (169 km) S
- Civil parish: Holland Fen with Brothertoft
- District: Borough of Boston
- Shire county: Lincolnshire
- Region: East Midlands
- Country: England
- Sovereign state: United Kingdom
- Post town: Boston
- Postcode district: PE22
- Police: Lincolnshire
- Fire: Lincolnshire
- Ambulance: East Midlands
- UK Parliament: Boston and Skegness

Langrick Bridge is a village in the civil parish of Holland Fen with Brothertoft in the Borough of Boston, Lincolnshire, England. The village is in the Lincolnshire Fens, 5 miles (8 km) north-west of Boston and 24 miles (40 km) south-east of Lincoln. It is at the southern side of the bridge of the same name which spans the River Witham. At the north side of the bridge the settlement is in the civil parish of Langriville. The southern boundary of the village of Langrick is 200 yards (180 m) north from the bridge.

The bridge has moorings on both banks, the next nearest moorings being 5 miles (8 km) upstream at Chapel Hill, and 2 miles (3 km) downstream at Anton's Gowt. The B1192 Coningsby to Kirton road runs through the settlement, which at the north of the bridge is Main Road, and at the south is Langrick Road that has an immediate junction with Ferry Lane which runs west to the North Forty Foot Bank.

It was formerly served by Langrick railway station. Closest to the bridge is Witham House, a Grade II listed two-storey building, dating to the early 18th century with later additions. To the south of the bridge on Ferry Lane and Langrick Road are detached and semi-detached houses, two farms, a fuel station, a shop selling boating equipment and food supplies, and a former Wesleyan Methodist chapel, built of red brick, with a datestone inscribed with '1868'.

== History ==
Before the bridge was built in 1909, the crossing was by chain ferry, giving the settlement the name Langrick Ferry or Langret Ferry, sometimes also seen partly as in the parish of Langriville. A 1723 map by William Stukeley shows the ferry over a "more meandering route than at present". An 1824 Ordnance Survey map shows Langrick Ferry as a settlement covering both banks of the Witham, whose course defined parish and settlement boundaries. By 1828, the Witham had been canalized (straightened) upstream and downstream of the ferry, although settlement boundaries followed the old course of the river. Construction plans for a bridge at Langrick Ferry were prepared in 1906.

In 1848 Langrick Ferry was an extra-parochial area described as being a small hamlet with twenty-two people, and in the soke and union of Horncastle, and by 1862 was a civil parish.

In 1855 Kelly's Directory recorded Langrick Ferry as a hamlet of 'Langrick Ville' "on the line of the Boston and Lincoln steamers", and in the extra-parochial district of Perry Corner in the Kesteven wapentake of Kirton. It had a population of 76, and included a Methodist chapel. Traders listed included six farmers, one of whom was also a surveyor, a blacksmith, a shopkeeper, and the occupant of the 'Ferry Boat Inn'. In 1885, under an entry for 'Langriville (or Wildmoor)' parish, the chapel at Langrick Ferry was again mentioned. Previously extra-parochial, the settlement now formed part of a parish in land south of the Witham, which itself had become part of the Holland sub-division of Lincolnshire in the Boston Union and county court district. The occupant of the 'Boat Inn' was listed, as was an auctioneer & estate agent. A post and telegraph office was listed in directories after 1905, the year when the occupant of the Ferry Boat Inn was also a brewer, and a corn merchant lived at Witham House.
