= William Amos =

William Amos may refer to:

- William Bradshaw Amos (born 1945), British biologist
- Bill Amos (1898–1987), college football player and coach
- William Amos (agriculturist) (1745–1825)
- William Amos (cricketer) (1860–1935), Australian cricketer
- Will Amos (born 1974), Canadian Liberal politician
