= Jeptha Pacey =

English architect and surveyor

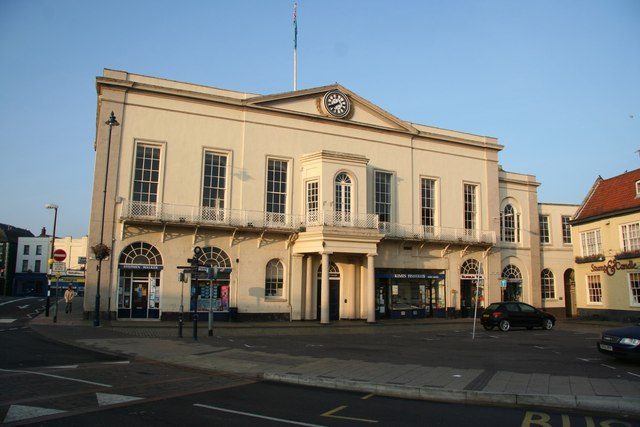
- Assembly Rooms, Boston
- Born: 1785?
- Died: 28 June 1862; Skirbeck, Boston
- Occupation: Architect
- Buildings: Boston Assembly Rooms
- Projects: Construction of Fenland churches after the Fenland Churches Act.

Jeptha Pacey (died 1862) was an architect, surveyor and building contractor working in Boston in Lincolnshire. Pacey was working as an architect at 10 Witham Place in Boston in 1826.

== Works ==
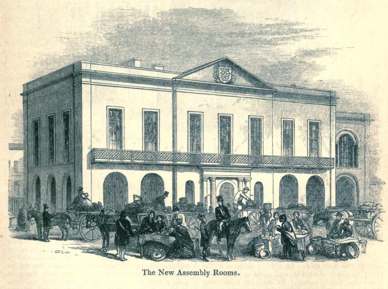
The New Assembly Rooms, Boston Lincolnshire in 1856

- Boston Assembly Rooms 1819–1820. The design of these buildings may be based partly on designs submitted earlier to Boston Corporation by the London architect William Atkinson. The building has a pedimented front with a canted first floor bay supported on Tuscan columns with a lattice balcony. Tall windows light a big assembly room. In 1826 White records the Assembly Rooms as having been built in 1819–20. They were over the poultry house and butter market). The rooms formed a handsome elevation, containing a suite of elegant and capacious assembly and banqueting rooms.

=== Churches ===
Five of six of churches built as a result of the Fens Chapels Act 1816 have been attributed to Jeptha Pacey by Nikolaus Pevsner. These churches are at Carrington (1816), Wildmore, Langrick, Midville and Frithville and are built in a late Georgian style. The exact reasons for Pevsner's attribution are unclear, except for some similarity with the church at Whaplode Drove. A sixth church in a similar style at Eastville is known to have been designed in 1840 by the Louth architect Charles John Carter.

- Whaplode Drove Church 1821. Designed with W Swansborough of Wisbech.
- Chapel at Chapel Hill, Tattershall, Lincolnshire.
- Episcopal Chapel (St Aiden's) High Street, Boston. c.1820. Jeptha Pacey was buried in the crypt of this chapel. Demolished.

=== Houses ===
- Wigtoft Vicarage, Lincolnshire 1817

== Literature ==
- Antram N (revised), Pevsner, N. & Harris J, (1989), The Buildings of England: Lincolnshire, Yale University Press.
- Colvin H. A (1995), Biographical Dictionary of British Architects 1600-1840. Yale University Press, 3rd edition London, pp. 719–20.
