= North Forty Foot Bank =

Settlement near Boston Lincolnshire, England

Coordinates: 53.012150°N 0.138557°W

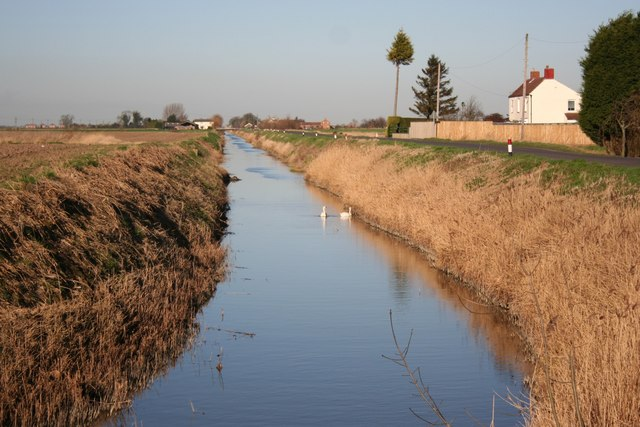
- North Forty Foot Drain

- Location within Lincolnshire
- OS grid reference: TF249477
  - London: 105 mi (169 km) S
- Civil parish: Holland Fen with Brothertoft
- District: Boston
- Shire county: Lincolnshire
- Region: East Midlands
- Country: England
- Sovereign state: United Kingdom
- Post town: Boston
- Postcode district: PE20
- Dialling code: 01205
- Police: Lincolnshire
- Fire: Lincolnshire
- Ambulance: East Midlands
- UK Parliament: Boston and Skegness

The North Forty Foot Bank is an area in the civil parish of Holland Fen with Brothertoft, in the Boston district, in the county of Lincolnshire, England. It runs about 6 miles (10 km) along the North Forty Foot Drain, about five to nine miles north-west of Boston. It begins just south of the parish of Chapel Hill and runs along the drain to Toft Tunnel, just north of Hubberts Bridge. Despite its length, it only consists of the area on the north side of the drain, which was built in 1720 by Earl Fitzwilliam. The North Forty Foot Bank forms the boundary between Harts Grounds and Pelhams Lands.

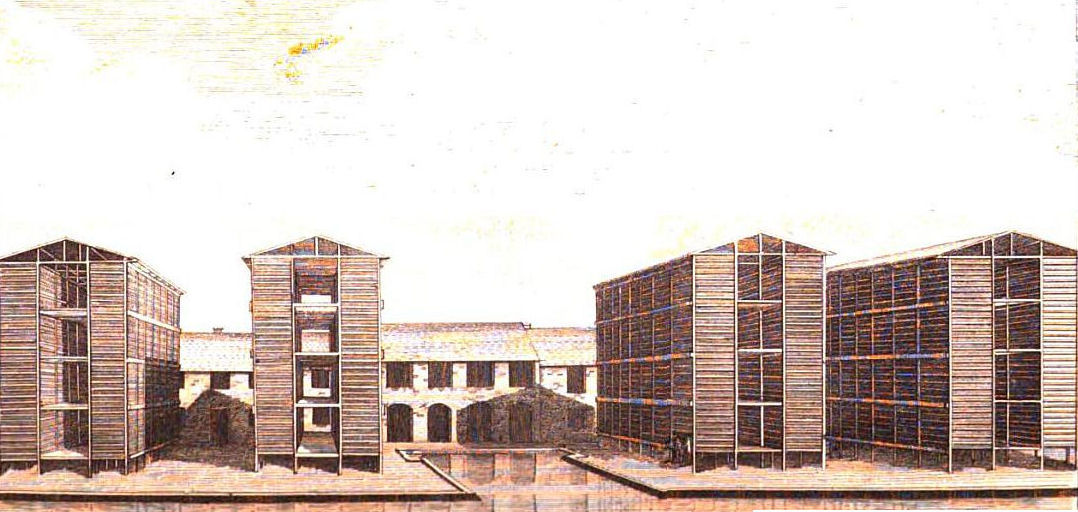
Major Cartwrights Woad Mill

A row of 29 brick and slate cottages were built between the North Forty Foot Bank and the hamlet of Brothertoft by Major John Cartwright to accommodate the workers of his red brick woad mill in the late 18th century. This place was then called Isatica, which is Latin for "woad". After Cartwright left Brothertoft for London, the hamlet of Isatica fell into ruin and disappeared.

North-Forty-Foot-Bank was formerly an extra-parochial tract, in 1858 North Forty Foot Bank became a separate civil parish, on 1 April 1906 the parish was abolished and merged with Brothertoft and Pelham's Lands. In 1901 the parish had a population of 163.

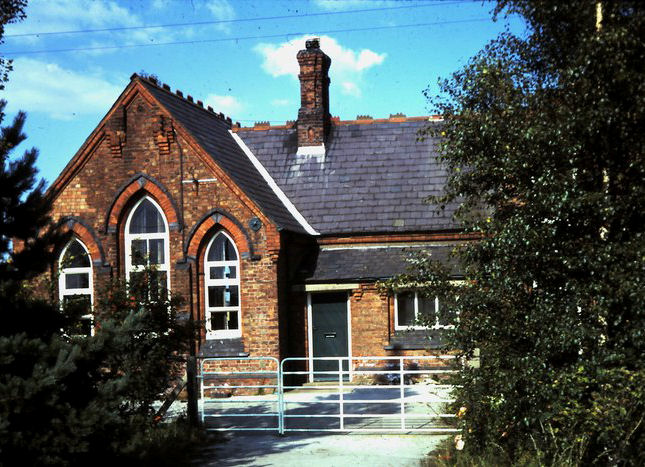
Hedgehog Bridge School

Settlements within North Forty Foot Bank include:

- Pelhams Land
- Harts Ground
- Holland Fen
- Hedgehog Bridge lies about 5 miles (8.0 km) north west of Boston, on the North Forty Foot Bank. It was named after a hump-backed bridge over the drain which no longer exists. Hedgehog Bridge School was built in 1880 by the North-East Holland Fen School Board for 95 children. It opened on 4 April 1881, became a Council School in 1903, and a County School about 1947. It finally closed in December 1969, and was demolished in 2010.
- Toft Tunnel lies at the junction of the North Forty Foot Bank and the B1192 Langrick Road. Today it consists mainly of farms.
