= Scoffin =

Scoffin is a surname. Notable people with the surname include:

- Thomas Scoffin (born 1994), Canadian curler
- William Scoffin (1654/1655–1732), English Presbyterian minister
