= Kirkstead =

Ancient village and former parish on the River Witham in Lincolnshire, England

Coordinates: 53.1515°N 0.2183°W

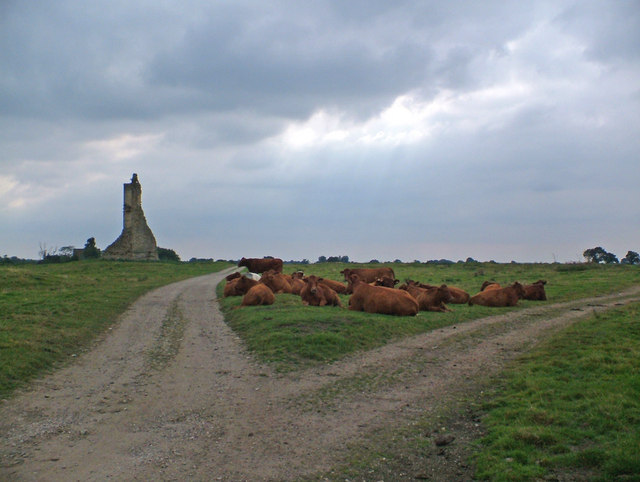
- The remains of Kirkstead Abbey

- Location within Lincolnshire
- OS grid reference: TF186617
- Civil parish: Woodhall Spa
- District: East Lindsey
- Shire county: Lincolnshire
- Region: East Midlands
- Country: England
- Sovereign state: United Kingdom
- Post town: Woodhall Spa
- Postcode district: LN10
- Dialling code: 01526
- Police: Lincolnshire
- Fire: Lincolnshire
- Ambulance: East Midlands

Kirkstead is a village and former civil parish now in the parish of Woodhall Spa, in the East Lindsey district, in Lincolnshire, England, on the River Witham. In 1961 the parish had a population of 85. It was merged with the civil parish of Woodhall Spa in 1987.

== History ==
Kirkstead has its origins in a Cistercian monastery, Kirkstead Abbey (the name Kirkstead means "the site of a church") founded in 1139 by Hugh Brito, lord of Tattershall and originally colonised by an abbot and twelve monks from Fountains Abbey in Yorkshire. It was around this abbey that the little settlement of Kirkstead grew. The abbey remained in existence until 1537, when it was dissolved and Richard Harrison (the last Abbot) and three of his monks were executed by King Henry VIII following their implication (probably unjustly) in the Lincolnshire Rising of the previous year.

The abbey and manor of Kirkstead passed to the Duke of Suffolk, Henry VIII's brother-in-law, and later to the Clintons, Earls of Lincoln, who built a large country house. By 1791 that too had gone, and all that remains today is a dramatic crag of masonry – a fragment of the south transept wall of the abbey church and the earthworks of the vast complex of buildings that once surrounded it.

The church of St Leonard's Without, thus named as it was outside the gates of the abbey, stands in a field by the side of the ruins of the abbey. Built between 1230 and 1240 it is an excellent example of the Early English style. Measuring only 42 feet (12.8 m) by 19 feet (5.8 m) it is up to "Cathedral standards" and may well have been built as a chantry chapel in memory of Robert de Tattershall who died in 1212.

After many centuries use as a church, it closed in 1877, when a Presbyterian congregation was evicted. From 1883 "The Society for the Protection of Ancient Buildings" fought to save it from total decay. Eventually during 1913 and 1914 it was restored by the architect Weir.

Kirkstead remained an isolated hamlet, but the area by the River Witham, 'Kirkstead Wharfs', developed as a locally important trading point on the canal system for goods being imported and exported in the local area, including coal.

With the opening in 1848 of the Lincoln to Boston line of the London and York Railway, a station was built here which was the nearest station to the increasingly fashionable spa town of Woodhall Spa, 1.2 mi (2 km) away. The resulting carriage trade, carrying the gentry to and from the spa, lasted until 1855 when a branch line opened from Kirkstead Station, (which then became known as Woodhall Junction) to Woodhall Spa and Horncastle. Woodhall Spa and Horncastle stations were closed to passengers in 1954. Woodhall Junction closed with the closure of its railway line in 1970.

The arrival of the railways greatly decreased the isolation of Kirkstead and the surrounding area. Kirkstead Wharfs was absorbed by the encroaching civil parish of Woodhall Spa in 1894. The remainder was incorporated into the parish in 1987, so that Kirkstead is now the western part of Woodhall Spa between the village centre and the River Witham.

Harold F Howard (August 30 1904 - 1945) was killed by a Luftwaffe aircraft cannon shell on the morning of Sunday March 4 1945 during Operation Gisela, whilst sleeping.

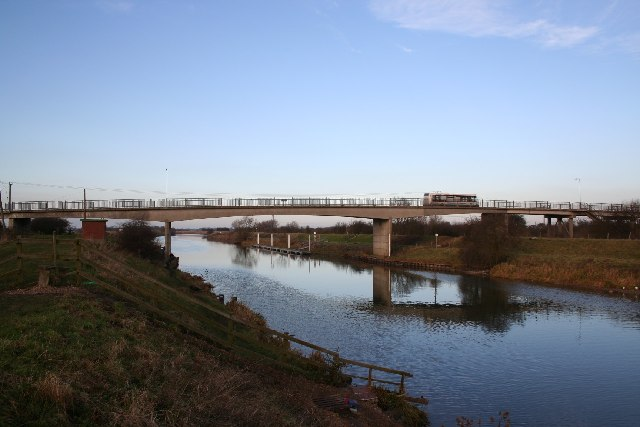
Kirkstead Bridge (December 2005)

The Kirkstead Bridge is a concrete arch bridge spanning the River Witham at Kirkstead in Woodhall Spa. Finished and opened in 1968, it carries the B1191 as it runs from Horncastle to the A15 road just north of Dunsby St Andrew. The bridge replaced an existing swing bridge alongside it. That had replaced a ferry that operated until the early 20th century.

== See also ==
- St Leonard's Without
- Kirkstead Abbey
