= Thornton le Fen =

Small civil parish in the East Lindsey district of Lincolnshire, England

Coordinates: 53.031615°N 0.092694°W

Thornton Le Fen
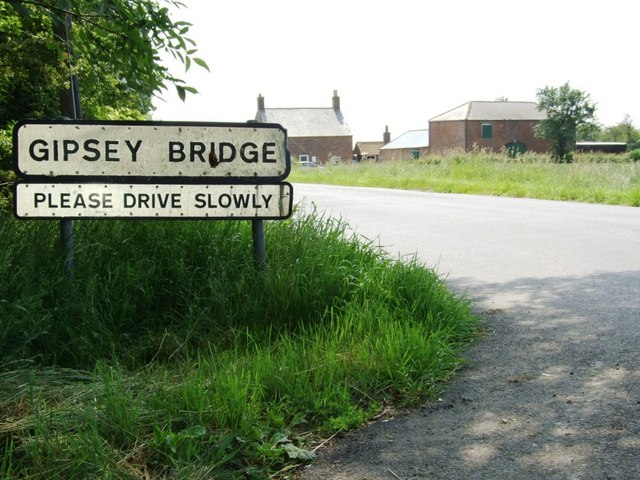
- Gipsey Bridge

- Location within Lincolnshire
- Population: 322 {2011}
- OS grid reference: TF280499
  - London: 110 mi (180 km) S
- District: East Lindsey
- Shire county: Lincolnshire
- Region: East Midlands
- Country: England
- Sovereign state: United Kingdom
- Post town: Boston
- Postcode district: PE22
- Police: Lincolnshire
- Fire: Lincolnshire
- Ambulance: East Midlands
- UK Parliament: Boston and Skegness

Thornton Le Fen is a small civil parish in the East Lindsey district of Lincolnshire, England. It is situated approximately 4 miles (6 km) north from the town of Boston.

Thornton Le Fen lies in Wildmore Fen, created in 1812 after the fen was drained in 1802. It is mostly farmland with a population of 345, and contains the hamlets of Bunkers Hill and Gipsey Bridge. The Census of 2011 showed a reduced population of 322.

Gipsey Bridge School was built in 1859 and was taken over by the Wildmore Fen United District School Board in 1879, when it was renamed the Gipsey Bridge Board School, until the Board was abolished in 1903. Following this it was known as Thornton Le Fen Council School, Thornton Le Fen County School, and Gipsey Bridge County Primary School, before it took its present name, Gipsey Bridge Primary School, in 1999.
