= Kirton Holme =

Village in Lincolnshire, England

Coordinates: 52.961565°N 0.123537°W

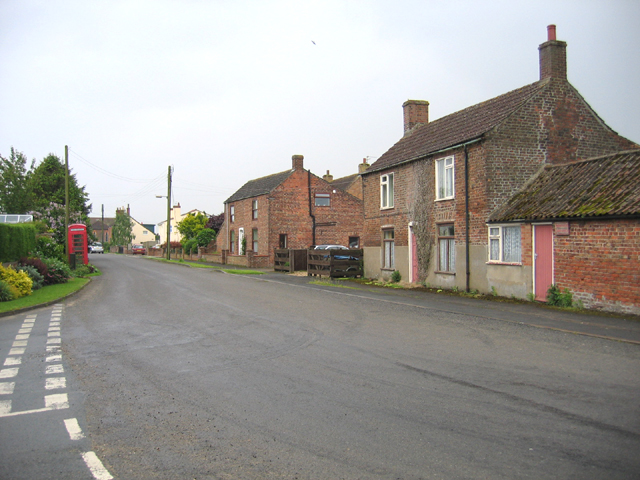
- Post Office, Kirton Holme

- Location within Lincolnshire
- OS grid reference: TF261421
  - London: 100 mi (160 km) S
- District: Boston
- Shire county: Lincolnshire
- Region: East Midlands
- Country: England
- Sovereign state: United Kingdom
- Post town: Boston
- Postcode district: PE20
- Dialling code: 01205
- Police: Lincolnshire
- Fire: Lincolnshire
- Ambulance: East Midlands
- UK Parliament: Boston and Skegness

Kirton Holme is a village in Lincolnshire, England. It is situated within Kirton civil parish, and approximately 4 miles (6 km) west from the town of Boston.

Kirton Holme church, Christ Church, is part of the Brothertoft Group also known as 'Five in the Fen', which also includes:

- St Gilbert of Sempringham, Brothertoft
- St Margaret of Scotland, Langrick
- All Saints, Holland Fen
- St Peter, Wildmore

The village County Primary School was erected in 1879 after the formation of the Kirton School Board, but closed in 1968.

Kirton Holme Golf Club is a nine-hole golf course, established in 1992.
