= New York, Lincolnshire =

Hamlet in Lincolnshire, England

Coordinates: 53.078810°N 0.140105°W

New York
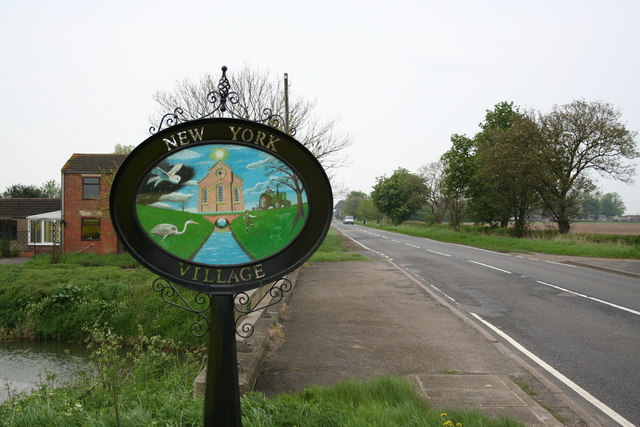
- New York village

- Location within Lincolnshire
- Population: 150
- OS grid reference: TF245555
  - London: 110 mi (180 km) S
- Civil parish: Wildmore
- District: East Lindsey
- Shire county: Lincolnshire
- Region: East Midlands
- Country: England
- Sovereign state: United Kingdom
- Post town: LINCOLN
- Postcode district: LN4
- Police: Lincolnshire
- Fire: Lincolnshire
- Ambulance: East Midlands
- UK Parliament: Louth and Horncastle

New York is a hamlet in the East Lindsey district of Lincolnshire, England, in the parish of Wildmore in the Lincolnshire Fens on the B1192 road near Coningsby, 11 1/2 miles (18.5 km) north of Boston. At the 2001 Census, its population was less than 150.

== Background ==
A Methodist church was built in New York in 1872. It was purchased at auction by a private buyer in July 2011.

New York County Primary School is on Langrick Road, 1.5 miles (2.4 km) to the south.

The hamlet is the inspiration for the Gavin Bryars piece New York.
