= Joseph Gilbert (Royal Navy officer) =

Seaman and hydrographer from England

Joseph Gilbert (1732–1831) was a British naval officer who was Master of HMS Resolution on the second voyage of Captain James Cook. As Master he was responsible for a number of specific duties, especially navigation.

He was born in Kirton, Lincolnshire, the youngest child of John Gilbert, a farmer and Churchwarden of Kirton and later Freiston. He joined the Royal Navy and rose to the rank of ship's Master.

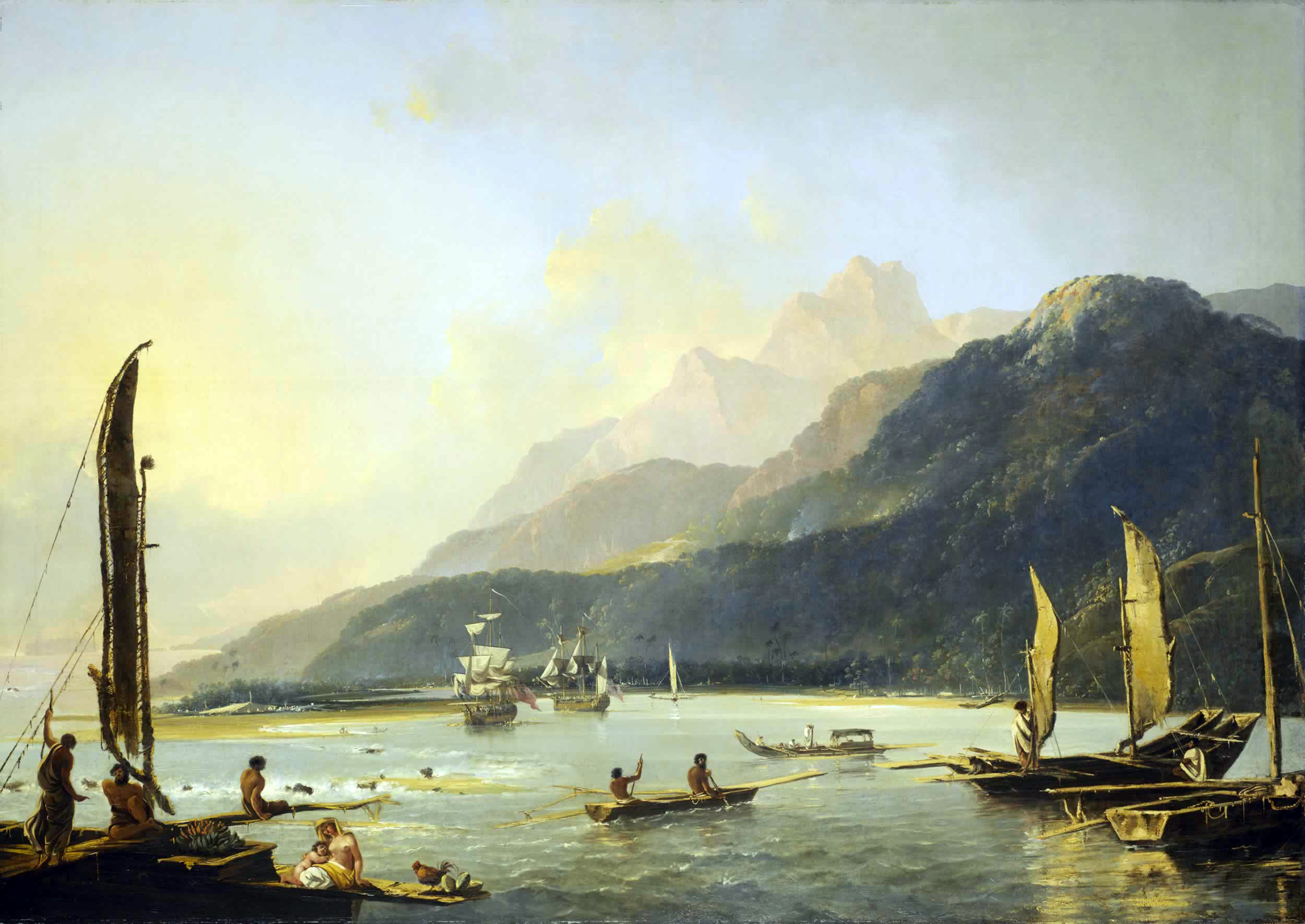
Resolution and Adventure in Matavai Bay on the north coast of Tahiti, painted by William Hodges

Between 1764 and 1769 he was Master of HMS Guernsey which surveyed the coasts of Newfoundland and Labrador. He was afterwards Master of HMS Pearl, which surveyed Plymouth Sound, and then of HMS Asia.

He was then chosen, at the relatively advanced age of 40, by Captain James Cook to be Master of HMS Resolution for his second voyage of discovery. This took place between 1772 and 1775 with the primary objective of locating Terra Australis Incognita, a continent which was presumed to lie in the southern Pacific. As a capable surveyor and draughtsman Gilbert produced several finely drawn charts on the voyage. On their return to England, Cook presented him with his watch.

On retirement from seagoing duties, Gilbert served as a Lieutenant from 1776 to 1791 as Master Attendant at Sheerness, Woolwich and then Portsmouth Dockyard . His last position was as Master Attendant at Deptford Dockyard between 1791 and 1802.

He retired to Hampshire in 1802 with his unmarried daughter Frances. His eldest son, George (1759–1786), sailed with Cook on his third voyage. His second son Richard (1767–1848) also served in the Royal Navy.
