= Langrick =

Village in Lincolnshire, England

Coordinates: 53.02247°N 0.106135°W

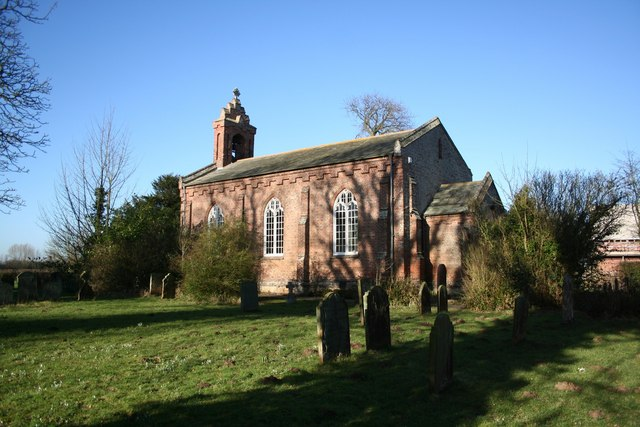
- St Margaret's Church, Langrick

- Location within Lincolnshire
- OS grid reference: TF271489
  - London: 105 mi (169 km) S
- Civil parish: Langriville
- District: East Lindsey
- Shire county: Lincolnshire
- Region: East Midlands
- Country: England
- Sovereign state: United Kingdom
- Post town: Boston
- Postcode district: PE22
- Police: Lincolnshire
- Fire: Lincolnshire
- Ambulance: East Midlands
- UK Parliament: Boston and Skegness

Langrick is a small village in the East Lindsey district of Lincolnshire, England. It is in the civil parish of Langriville, and on the B1192 road, 5 miles (8 km) north-west from Boston. The village lies in the Lincolnshire Fens, and less than 1 mile (1.6 km) east from the River Witham.

== History ==
The name Langrick appears to come from "Long Creek" and is at the very southern edge of Wildmore Fen, in an area which was once the manor of Armtree, in the parish of Coningsby. It was once the site of a hermitage belonging to Kirkstead Abbey. When Langrick and Langriville were enclosed in 1812 there was not a single house existing. Langrick's importance was that it was the site of a ferry crossing over the River Witham, reputedly built by Robert Dymoke. The river was straightened in 1833.

A steel bridge, still in use, was built in the southern neighbouring settlement of Langrick Ferry in 1909, replacing a previous ferry over the Witham.

== Church ==
Saint Margaret of Scotland Church was built in 1828, probably by Jeptha Pacey, but was not dedicated until 20 April 1922. It is a Grade II listed building and was restored and altered in 1885. The registers of births and deaths date from 1831, and those of marriages from 1837. The church was restored again and redecorated in 1935, and further work was carried out in 1968.

Today, the church forms part of the Brothertoft Group, in the Diocese of Lincoln, also known as 'Five in the Fen', which also includes:

- St Gilbert of Sempringham, Brothertoft
- All Saints, Holland Fen
- Christ Church, Kirton Holme
- St Peter, Wildmore

== Railway station ==
Langrick railway station was on the now dismantled Great Northern Railway railway line between Lincoln and Boston. A cafe stands on the site of the station master's house and booking office.

The Water Rail Way follows the route of the old dismantled railway line from Lincoln to Boston and can be joined at Langrick.

Near the site of the old railway line is the Ferry Boat Inn public house.
