= Thomas Middlecott Academy =

Location
- Edinburgh Drive; Kirton, Lincolnshire, PE20 1JS; England; 52.92396°N 0.05933°W

Information
- Type: Academy
- Established: January 1956
- Department for Education URN: 141391 Tables
- Ofsted: Reports
- Sponsor: The David Ross Education Trust
- Principal: Lisa Hawkins
- Gender: Coeducational
- Age: 11 to 16
- Website: http://www.thomasmiddlecott.co.uk/

Thomas Middlecott Academy is a coeducational secondary school in Kirton, Lincolnshire, England.

The school's curriculum includes GCSEs and BTECs, with some courses taken in conjunction with Boston College.

== History ==
=== Secondary modern school ===
The Kirton County Senior School was built in 1879. The first stage was planned to open in September 1955, but opened in January 1956. It was built by Harold H. Adkins Ltd of Boston. Work began in early 1954. In total the cost was £99,942. There were nine acres of playing fields, next to the railway line. The metalwork room had power machinery, and oxy-acetylene welding, and cutting apparatus.

The official opening was on 2 March 1956 by Sir Herbert Butcher, the local MP. There were 332 at the start, which would be over 400 in three years. Building was hoped to be fully complete by July 1956, but it took until the end of 1956. The site was extended by two acres, near the railway line, in the mid 1960s.

In May 1987, the county council committee decided to change the name from Kirton County Secondary School to the Middlecott School, after Sir Thomas Middlecott, a former mayor of Boston in the 1610s.

=== Academy ===
It was previously a community school administered by Lincolnshire County Council, but converted to academy status in March 2015. However the school was renamed from Middlecott School to Thomas Middlecott Academy in January 2015. The school has joined other academies as part of the David Ross Education Trust, however the school continues to coordinate with Lincolnshire County Council for its admissions.

=== Visits ===
Birgitte, Duchess of Gloucester opened the £500,000 technology block on Tuesday 7 October 1997 at 2.30pm, after visiting Sibsey primary school, and later opened a £850,000 indoor tennis centre in Boston.

== Exam results ==
In 2003, it was in the bottom 30 English schools at GCSE, with the same % of 5 grades A-C as the Earl of Scarbrough High School, but the Skegness school had lower average results per person. It had similar results and numbers to Tennyson High School in Mablethorpe, which was also in the bottom 30 schools in England, but the Mablethorpe school had 12% of 5 grades A-C. The Middlefield School in Gainsborough had 10% of 5 grades A-C, but had higher GCSE average marks than the other three Lincolnshire schools.

In 2004 it was the fifth-lowest school in England for the % of 5 grades at A-C, with 9%. The Mablethorpe and Skegness schools had improved that year.

== Notable former pupils ==
- Mick Vinter, Notts County footballer
