= Kirton in Holland Town Hall =

Municipal building in Kirton in Holland, Lincolnshire, England

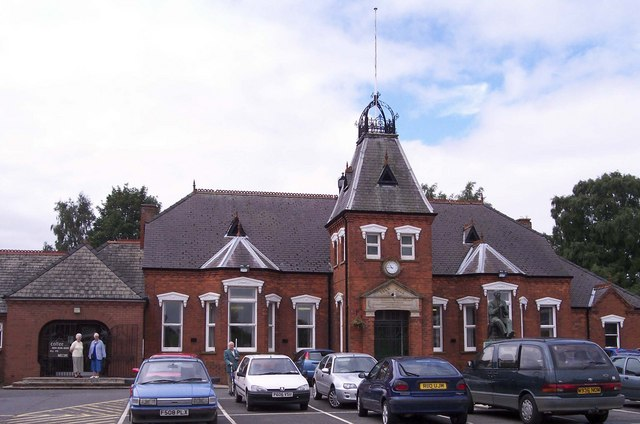
- Kirton in Holland Town Hall

- Shown in Lincolnshire
- 52.9275°N 0.0566°W
- Location: Station Road, Kirton, Lincolnshire

History
- Built: 1912

Site notes
- Architect: Henry Kidd
- Architectural style: Châteauesque style

Kirton in Holland Town Hall is a municipal building in Station Road in Kirton, Lincolnshire, England. The structure is currently used as a community events venue and as the meeting place of Kirton Parish Council.

== History ==
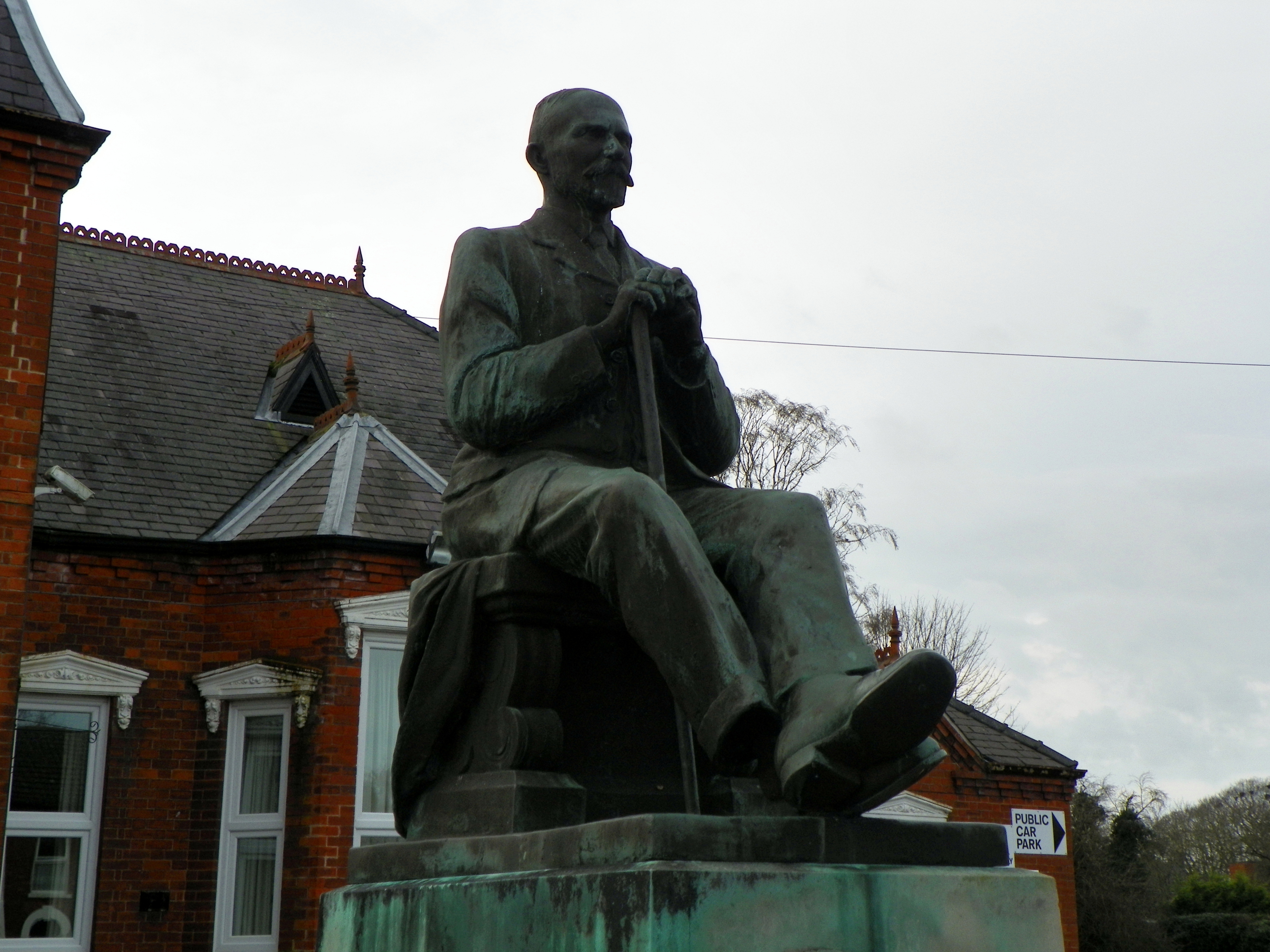
Statue of William Dennis

The town hall was commissioned and paid for by a local potato businessman, William Dennis, to commemorate the Coronation of George V and Mary. The site he chose for the new building was open land on the south side of Station Road. The foundation stone for the new building was laid in 1911. It was designed by Henry Kidd in the Châteauesque style, built in red brick and was officially opened by Baroness von Eckardstein (Note: Baroness von Eckardstein was the daughter of the furniture businessman, Sir John Blundell Maple, and the wife of the local member of parliament, Sir Archibald Weigall.) in August 1912.

The design involved a symmetrical main frontage with seven bays facing onto Station Road. The central bay, which slightly projected forward, featured a two-stage tower; there was a doorway flanked by pilasters supporting a foundation stone and a pediment in the first stage, two small pedimented windows in the second stage and a mansard roof and an iron crown above. The second bays on both sides were fenestrated by pedimented bay windows while the other bays were fenestrated by pedimented sash windows. The building was subsequently extended with a four-bay extension to the left and a single bay extension to the right. Internally, the principal rooms were the main assembly hall and a smaller reception room, known as the Upsall Room, which became the meeting place of Kirton Parish Council.

A statue to commemorate the life of the benefactor, William Dennis, was designed by Philip Lindsey Clark and was unveiled in front of the town hall in 1930.

The Upsall Room and the entrance hall were refurbished in the early 21st century and the management of the town hall was transferred to a committee of local residents and users which was registered as a charity in 2007. A recipe book was published by the town hall management committee in June 2011 to commemorate the centenary of the completion of the town hall.
