= Langriville =

Civil parish in Lincolnshire, England

Coordinates: 53.021392°N 0.105955°W

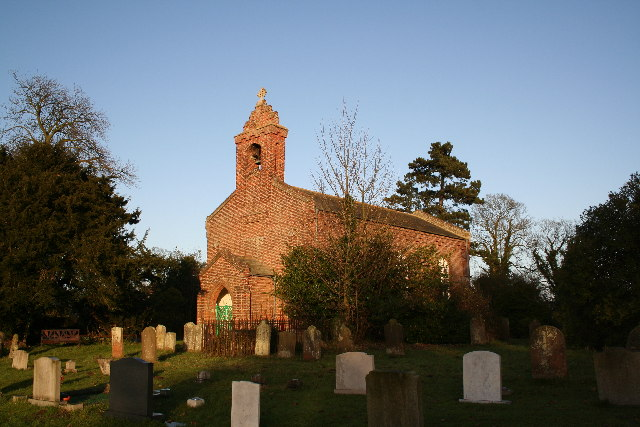
- Langrick Church

- Location within Lincolnshire
- Population: 368 (Including Langrick. 2011)
- OS grid reference: TF271487
- District: East Lindsey
- Shire county: Lincolnshire
- Region: East Midlands
- Country: England
- Sovereign state: United Kingdom
- Post town: Boston
- Postcode district: PE22
- Police: Lincolnshire
- Fire: Lincolnshire
- Ambulance: East Midlands
- UK Parliament: Boston and Skegness

Langriville is a civil parish in Lincolnshire, England, about 5 miles (8.0 km) north west of the town of Boston on the B1192, and on the banks of the River Witham.

== History ==
Langriville was created a township in 1812 near a ferry over the River Witham called Langrick Ferry (now Langrick Bridge) from which the parish has taken its name. The parish consists of the portion of Wildmore Fen allotted to the Earl of Stamford & Warrington in lieu of his manorial rights over Armtree and Wildmore fens.

It was said by Pishey Thompson in his History and Antiquities of Boston, that the name probably came from "Long Creek" as it was the largest and longest creek in the fen, where about a mile north of the present village of Langrick there was a sluice erected in 1543.

The area was formerly belonging to Kirkstead Abbey as is evidenced by references made by the Boston Corporation records claiming rights on Armtree Fen in the early 17th Century.

According to William Marrat's History of Lincolnshire, there was a hermitage belonging to Kirkstead Abbey here.

== Church ==
Saint Margaret of Scotland Church was built in Langrick village in 1828, but was not dedicated until 20 April 1922.

The registers of births and deaths date from 1831, and those of marriages from 1837. The church was restored and redecorated in 1935, and further work was carried out in 1968.

== Population ==
Population of Langriville Civil Parish
Year	1821	1831	1841	1851	1881	1891	1901	1911	1921	1931	1951	1961	2001	2011
Population	195	202	221	292	505	397	337	398	376	410	316	336	421	368
