= Kirton End =

Hamlet in the civil parish of Kirton in the Boston district of Lincolnshire, England

Coordinates: 52.943520°N 0.081315°W

- Location within Lincolnshire
- Population: (2001)
- OS grid reference: TF290401
  - London: 100 mi (160 km) S
- District: Boston
- Shire county: Lincolnshire
- Region: East Midlands
- Country: England
- Sovereign state: United Kingdom
- Post town: Boston
- Postcode district: PE20
- Police: Lincolnshire
- Fire: Lincolnshire
- Ambulance: East Midlands
- UK Parliament: Boston and Skegness

Kirton End is a hamlet in the civil parish of Kirton in the Boston district of Lincolnshire, England. It lies on the B1391 road, 4 miles (6 km) south-west from Boston, and 1.5 miles (2.4 km) north-east from Kirton.

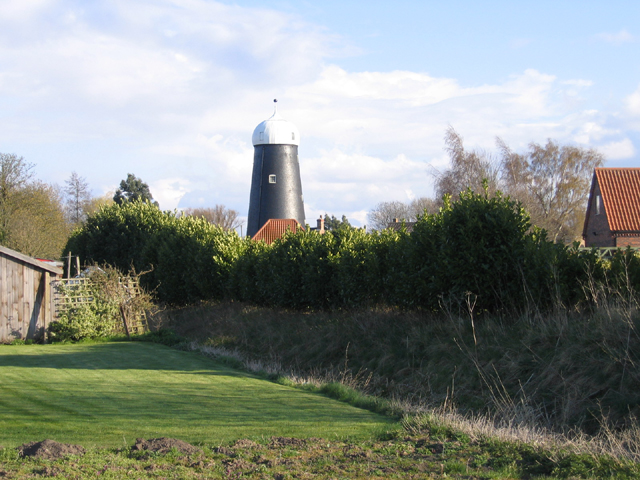
Windmill, Kirton End

Kirton End has two Grade II listed buildings, one a disused windmill on Donington Road (B1391). The other a former public house called the Old Windmill on Willington Road.
