= St Leonard's Without =

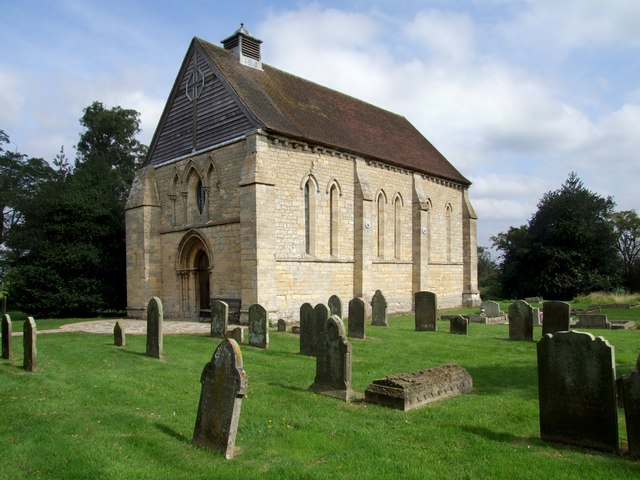
- The Church of St Leonard, Kirkstead
- St Leonard's Without
- 53°08′10″N 0°13′21″W
- Denomination: Church of England
- Website: https://woodhallspa.group/kirkstead

History
- Dedication: Leonard of Noblac

Administration
- Diocese: Diocese of Lincoln

The church of St Leonard's Without is a small chapel built between 1230 and 1240 in the parish of Kirkstead, Lincolnshire, close to Woodhall Spa.

The chapel lies close to the now-ruined Kirkstead Abbey founded in 1139. It served as the capella ante portas (Latin for chapel outside the gates) to the abbey and its name refers to its being "without" (outside) the walls of the monastery.

A Grade I listed building, it is an excellent example of the Early English style. Even though measuring only 12.8 metres (42 ft) by 5.8 metres (19 ft), it is up to "cathedral standards" of construction. It may well have been built as a chantry chapel in memory of Robert de Tattershall, who died in 1212.

After use for many centuries as a church, it closed in 1877, when a Presbyterian congregation was evicted. From 1883 the Society for the Protection of Ancient Buildings fought to save it from total decay. Eventually during 1913 and 1914, it was restored by the architect William Weir.

== See also ==
- List of English abbeys, priories and friaries serving as parish churches
- Woodhall Spa
