= William Scoffin =

William Scoffin (1654/5-1732) was an English Presbyterian minister. He was ejected by the Bartholomew Act from Brothertoft. He later became pastor of a congregation of Dissenters at Sleaford, where he continued to preach for more than forty years. His peaceable and candid disposition gained him the esteem and respect of the whole neighbourhood, so that some of the principal inhabitants of the town, though they never attended his ministry, expressed their value for him by making him annual presents as long as he lived. He published two funeral sermons and two other small tracts. He died in November 1732 at age 77.
