= Harts Ground =

Hamlet in Lincolnshire, England

Coordinates: 53.062469°N 0.198751°W

Harts Grounds
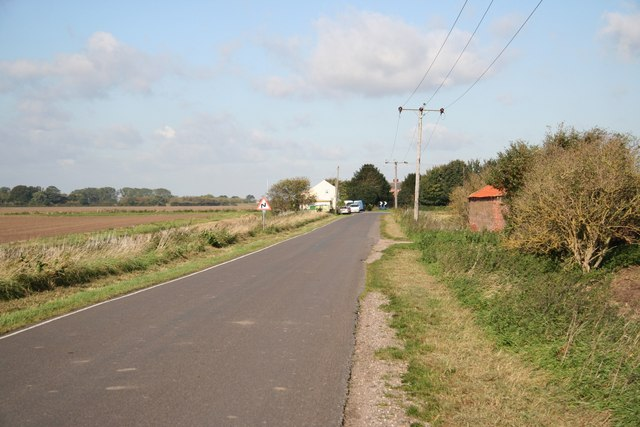
- Harts Ground

- Location within Lincolnshire
- OS grid reference: TF208532
  - London: 100 mi (160 km) S
- Civil parish: Holland Fen with Brothertoft
- District: Boston
- Shire county: Lincolnshire
- Region: East Midlands
- Country: England
- Sovereign state: United Kingdom
- Post town: Boston
- Postcode district: LN4
- Police: Lincolnshire
- Fire: Lincolnshire
- Ambulance: East Midlands
- UK Parliament: Boston and Skegness

Harts Ground or Harts Grounds is a former civil parish, now in the parish of Holland Fen with Brothertoft, in the Boston district, Lincolnshire, England. It is situated 9 miles (14 km) north-west from the town of Boston.

Harts Ground was formerly an extra-parochial area, prone to flooding prior to the drainage of Holland Fen in 1767. In 1858 it became a civil parish, on 1 April 1935 when it was reduced to enlarge Dogdyke, on 1 April 1987 the parish was abolished to form Holland Fen with Brothertoft. In 1971 the parish had a population of 4. It was, and remains today, an area of isolated farms.

Harts Grounds Farmhouse dated to the late 18th century and was built in rendered brick with a pantile roof. It was a Grade II listed building but was de-listed in May 2018 as it was no longer in existence
