= William Amos (agriculturist) =

British agriculturalist

William Amos (c. 1745–1825) was a farmer, bailiff and estate steward who contributed through his inventions and published writings to the British Agricultural Revolution. He designed a number of improved agricultural machines and implements, and actively promoted more efficient farming techniques. His experiments and publications were widely discussed during his lifetime and continued to attract attention in the years following his death.

== Biography ==
Amos was born around 1745 though his geographical origins are unknown. One nineteenth-century source claimed that he was Scottish by birth but no confirmation of this has been found. According to his own brief remarks, he was raised in the countryside and was 'strongly attached to rural pursuits' from an early age. The earliest record of him is of his marriage in Grove, Nottinghamshire on 25 February 1781 to Sarah Freeman, the daughter of a Nottinghamshire farmer. He was employed at this time as estate steward to Anthony Eyre, owner of several estates in the English Midlands. Over the years that followed Amos and Sarah were to have five sons and three daughters, many of whom died at an early age: only his second son (Thomas Amos, who became a farmer in the Spalding area of Lincolnshire) is known to have had issue.

Amos's interest in new agricultural practices led him to undertake a series of crop trials from 1783 onwards, and these convinced him of the superiority of seed-drilling over the traditional broadcast method of sowing. As early as 1787 he was developing his own version of a drill-plough and he announced plans in that year for a book describing it; but his employer's death in 1788 and his subsequent move to Brothertoft in Lincolnshire as bailiff to Major John Cartwright (political reformer) delayed this project.

While acting as bailiff and later as estate steward to Cartwright, Amos conducted further trials on his own farm as well as Cartwright's. Cartwright combined an active political career with a keen interest in agricultural improvement, and the collaboration between the two men over a period of fifteen years or so proved beneficial to both. It also brought Amos into contact with their close neighbour Sir Joseph Banks, who later described Amos as 'an honest man and an ingenious one', and with the agriculturist Arthur Young, who visited Cartwright's farm, saw some of Amos's inventions and remained in correspondence with him, obtaining a number of submissions from Amos for publication in his Annals of Agriculture. It was during this period of his life that Amos published his two books, The Theory and Practice of the Drill Husbandry and Minutes in Agriculture.

When Cartwright sold his estate in the mid-1800s Amos moved to take up a tenancy of his own on the recently drained Lincolnshire West Fen, residing first in Stickney and subsequently in the newly established township of Carrington, where he ran a predominantly arable farm. A series of family bereavements (including in late 1816 his wife Sarah) combined with the agricultural recession that followed the end of the Napoleonic Wars brought about a marked decline in his fortunes. He appears never to have tried to patent any of his inventions and it seems unlikely that he earned much if anything from his published works. There is some indication from his final work (see below) that he may also have lost money when several Boston banks collapsed during 1814 and 1815. His final published work was something of a departure from his usual topics: a polemical pamphlet that appeared in 1816 (A Dissertation on the Real Cause and Effectual Cure of the Present National Distress) in which he strongly criticised the political establishment of his day and set out his proposals for reforms to the public finances and the banking system. The Dissertation is, however, above all a plea for proper recognition of working farmers, the ‘miserable drudges of agriculture’ who (Amos asserts) are ‘the very basis of national prosperity’, in contrast to what he saw as the vested interest of the landowning class. In 1821, at the age of 75 and close to retirement, Amos married a 22-year-old widow (Elizabeth Scargal née Dowse). They had a son and a daughter, both of whom died as children. Amos died at his home in Boston on 8 April 1825 and was buried at Stickney Parish Church in Lincolnshire.

== Work ==
Amos's best-known work, The Theory and Practice of the Drill Husbandry, was first published in August 1794 and was reissued in March 1802. The book begins by providing evidence from his own crop trials in favour of the seed drill, claiming yield increases of up to 20% over the traditional method of broadcast sowing. The book then gives detailed instructions, accompanied by illustrations, for the construction of Amos's own drill machines (in two versions), a drill plough and two other devices (an expanding horse-hoe and scuffle). He had previously (in 1788) sought and failed to obtain a commendation for his drill from the Society for the Encouragement of the Arts, and in a much-disputed claim accused one of the Society's members, James Cooke, of having stolen his design. It is known from Arthur Young's comments that not only Major Cartwright but at least one other Lincolnshire farmer used Amos's design, but it is unclear how many others adopted it. The expanding horse-hoe had moveable shares that, unlike its main rivals, could be adjusted to suit the differing distances at which seed had been drilled. Amos's cheap and practicable drill plough was adopted by Arthur Young who in turn commended it to the Board of Agriculture and several others.

Amos's second book, Minutes in Agriculture, appeared in August 1804 (with a reissue in June 1810). His stated intention was to settle the issue of which varieties of grass were most suitable for graziers to use, and his book contained advice on this accompanied by illustrations and dried grass specimens. The more theoretical botanical sections of the work were derivative and on publication attracted largely hostile comment (though later commentators recognised the usefulness of the practical recommendations). But Amos also added details in his book about the construction and use of a variety of farming implements. These included his own designs for a horse-drawn thistle cutter, sward-dresser and compound roller, and (less well-received because of doubts about its practicality) his own version of a tree transplanter. Moreover, he added his voice to those of fellow improvers by calling for the removal of 'obstacles that oppose the promoting, improving and extending' of agriculture, and he castigates 'gentlemen of landed property' for ignoring the proper management of their land. Amos's other published writings span the years 1798–1816 and chiefly take the form of essays and letters in agricultural journals, covering a variety of topics from potato cultivation to his plans to design a workable reaping machine (in which endeavour, however, he later acknowledged he had been unsuccessful). He won a gold medal from the Board of Agriculture for two of these essays. Of broader appeal, and attracting more interest, were his "Essays on Agricultural Machines" as published in the Board of Agriculture's Communications of 1810. These covered: a new design for a dynanometer (his spelling of dynamometer) for measuring the relative resistances of ploughs or the weight needed to draw them forward; the construction of a new roller and set of harrows; the breaking of horses and oxen; and the construction of carriage wheels 'upon a new principle'. The most important of these essays, however, was "On the Mathematical Construction of a Plough" in which he offered an original and practical solution to the problem of efficient plough design with special reference to the mouldboard. It was in the course of this essay that he challenged Thomas Jefferson's claim to have discovered the mathematical principles for constructing a mould-board of least resistance. This prompted one of Jefferson's nineteenth-century admirers to vilify Amos posthumously, though less partisan American critics subsequently declared Jefferson's design to be badly flawed. Amos's approach to plough construction, though it built on the work of others, particularly of John Bailey (1750–1819), earned him a place in the history of plough design.

== Impact ==
The readership for Amos's books during his lifetime was probably only a few hundred, though his articles in Young's Annals of Agriculture and the Board of Agriculture's Communications would certainly have reached a greater number, and reviews and cyclopedia entries would have extended knowledge of his ideas still further. Unlike many of the best-known pioneers of the Agricultural Revolution, men such as Thomas Coke, 1st Earl of Leicester, Jethro Tull and Sir John Sinclair, Amos had neither the wealth nor the social standing to promote his ideas, but his publications establish him as an important contributor to the development of improved and evidence-based agricultural practice in the late eighteenth and early nineteenth centuries.

== Key publications ==
- The Theory and Practice of the Drill Husbandry Founded Upon Philosophical Principles and Confirmed by Experience, 1st edition 1794, second edition 1802.
- Minutes in Agriculture, 1st edition 1804, 2nd edition 1810.
- "Essays on Agricultural Machines", Communications to the Board of Agriculture, volume vi, part i, (London, 1810), pp. 437–468.
