= Wildmore =

Civil parish in Lincolnshire, England

Coordinates: 53.068400°N 0.136437°W

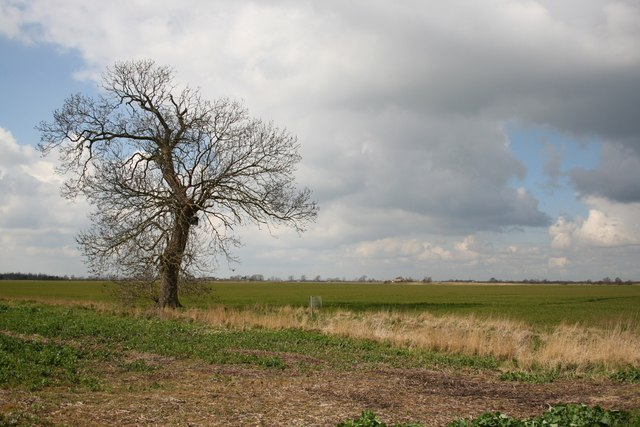
- Wildmore Fen

- Location within Lincolnshire
- Population: 547 (2011)
- OS grid reference: TF247550
  - London: 110 mi (180 km) S
- District: East Lindsey
- Shire county: Lincolnshire
- Region: East Midlands
- Country: England
- Sovereign state: United Kingdom
- Post town: Lincoln
- Postcode district: LN4
- Police: Lincolnshire
- Fire: Lincolnshire
- Ambulance: East Midlands
- UK Parliament: Louth and Horncastle (UK Parliament constituency)

Wildmore is a civil parish in the East Lindsey district of Lincolnshire, England. It is situated approximately 9 miles (14 km) north-west from the town of Boston and 11 miles (18 km) south from Horncastle.

There is no village called Wildmore; the village of New York lies within the parish boundaries as does the hamlet of Haven Bank.

== History ==
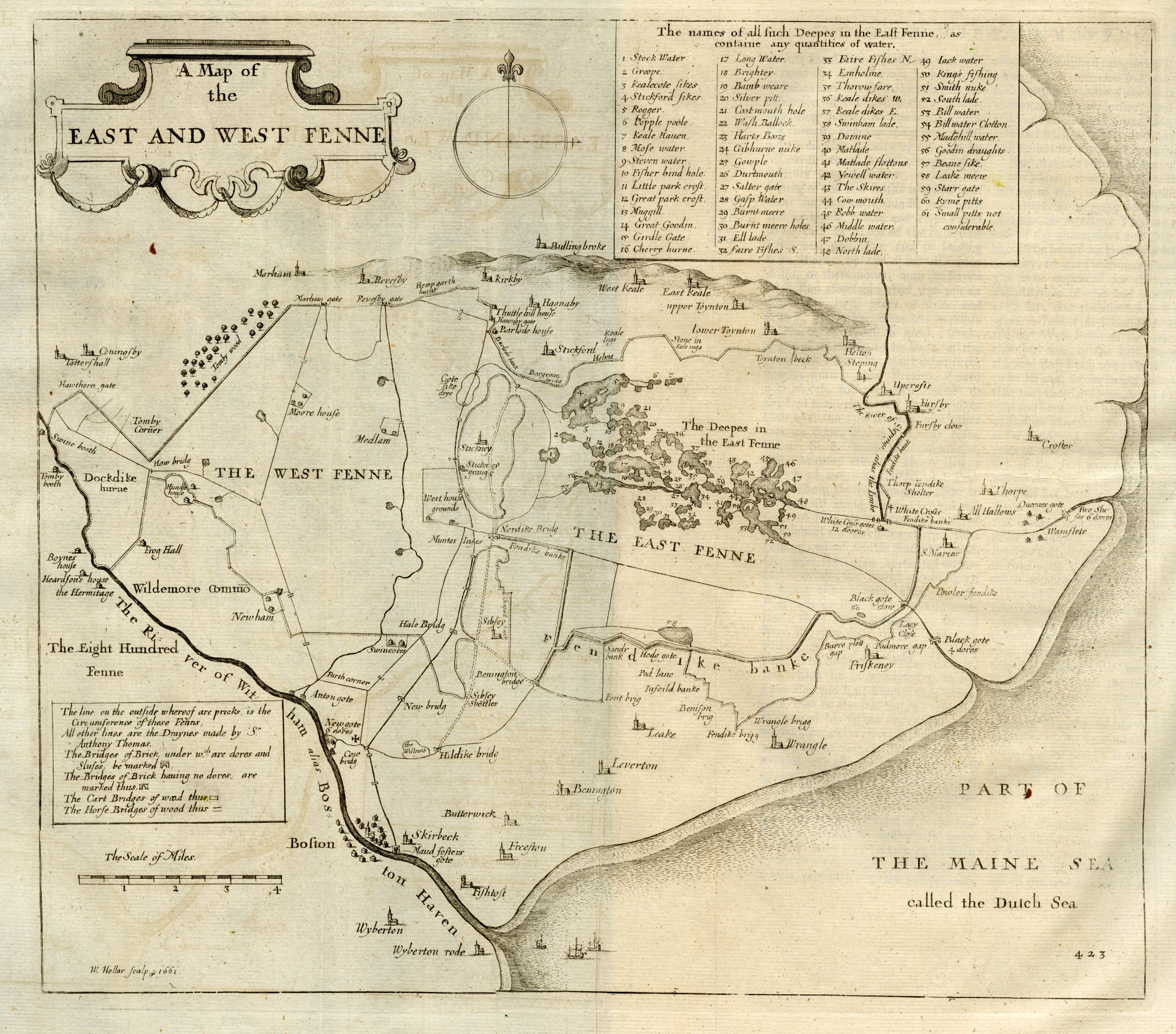
A Map of East and West Fenne from "The history of imbanking and drayning" by William Dugdale (1662).

The name Wildmore comes from the surrounding Wildmore Fen. It appears from a manuscript now in the British Museum, that it belonged after the Norman Conquest to the baronies of Bolingbroke, Horncastle and Scrivelsby.

William Romara, who held Bolingbroke, gave his portion to Kirkstead Abbey during the reign of King Stephen.

Henry I afforested the whole of the fenland area and these continued to be the Kings hunting grounds until 1230 in the reign of Henry III.

Henry II gave Horncastle to Gerbald Skalls, Scrivelsby to Robert Marmion and Kirkstead Abbey the Hermitage of Wildmore. Skalls and Marmion gave the monks of Kirkstead right of common pasture in Wildmore.

By 1222 the Abbot of Kirkstead, styled Lord of Wildmore, possessed the whole of Wildmore with the exception of Moorhouses which belonged to Revesby Abbey.

Wildmore Fen was not drained until 1802, being part of the drainage plans of the East, West, and Wildmore Fens.

Wildmore was formed as a parish in 1880 from the fen allotments of West Ashby, Horncastle, Mareham on the Hill, Moorby, Roughton, Thimbleby, High Toynton, Low Toynton, and Wood Enderby; and detached parts of Bolingbroke, Coningsby, Haltham, Tattershall, Tattershall Thorpe, Thornton le Fen, Toynton All Saints, and Wilksby.

== Church ==
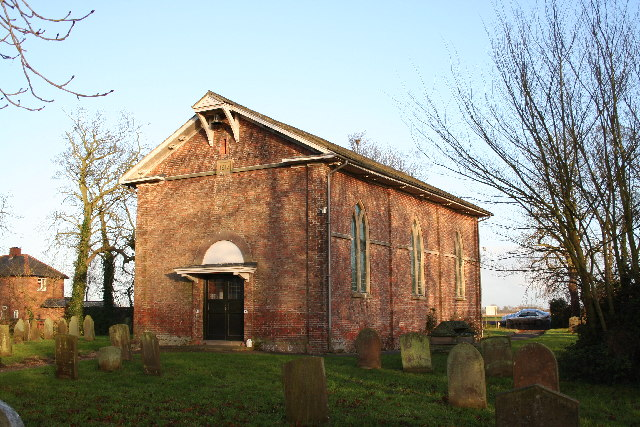
St Peter's church, Wildmore

In 1816 the church, known as Frog Hall, was built of red brick, sandstone and limestone. It was dedicated to Saint Peter and is a Grade II listed building.

Today Saint Peters Church is one of the Brothertoft Group in the Diocese of Lincoln, also known as "Five in the Fen", which also includes St Gilbert of Sempringham (Brothertoft), All Saints (Holland Fen), Christ Church (Kirton Holme) and St Margaret of Scotland (Langrick).

== Windmill ==
Haven Bank Windmill was built in the early 19th century of red brick and is a Grade II listed building.
