= William Amos (cricketer) =

Australian cricketer (1860–1935)

Personal information
- Born: 20 April 1860; Glen Osmond, South Australia
- Died: 14 May 1935 (aged 75); North Adelaide, South Australia
- Bowling: Right-arm leg break

Domestic team information
- Years: Team
- 1890/91–1892/93: South Australia

Career statistics
Competition	First-class
Matches	2
Runs scored	18
Batting average	4.50
100s/50s	0/0
Top score	9
Balls bowled	210
Wickets	1
Bowling average	129.00
5 wickets in innings	0
10 wickets in match	0
Best bowling	1/87
Catches/stumpings	0/–
- Source: ESPNcricinfo, 16 February 2022

William Amos (20 April 1860 – 14 May 1935) was an Australian cricketer from Adelaide. He played two first-class matches for South Australia between 1890 and 1893.
