= Holland Fen with Brothertoft =

Civil parish in Lincolnshire, England

- Location within Lincolnshire
- Population: 669 (2011)
- OS grid reference: TF235495
  - London: 105 mi (169 km) S
- District: Boston (borough)
- Shire county: Lincolnshire
- Region: East Midlands
- Country: England
- Sovereign state: United Kingdom
- Post town: Lincoln
- Postcode district: LN4
- Police: Lincolnshire
- Fire: Lincolnshire
- Ambulance: East Midlands
- UK Parliament: Boston and Skegness (UK Parliament constituency)

Holland Fen with Brothertoft is a civil parish in Lincolnshire, England, consisting, as the name indicates, of Holland Fen and Brothertoft, but also includes the areas known as Pelhams Land, Harts Ground and Pepper Gowt Plot. The population of the civil parish (including North Forty Foot Bank and Shingay) at the 2011 census was 669.

The parish is one of 18 parishes, together with Boston, that form the Borough of Boston in the county of Lincolnshire, England. The local government has been arranged in this way since the reorganization of 1 April 1974, which resulted from the Local Government Act 1972. This parish forms part of the Swineshead and Holland Fen electoral ward.

Hitherto, the parish had formed part of Boston Rural District, in the Parts of Holland. Holland was one of the three divisions (formally known as parts) of the traditional county of Lincolnshire. Since the Local Government Act 1888, Holland had been in most respects, a county in itself.

== Community ==
Holland Fen with Brothertoft

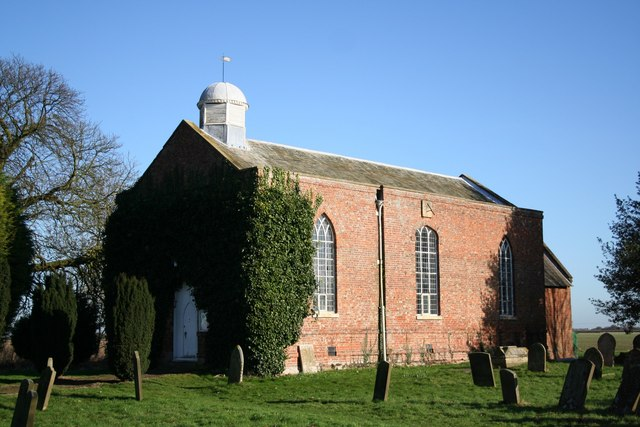
All Saints' Church, Holland Fen

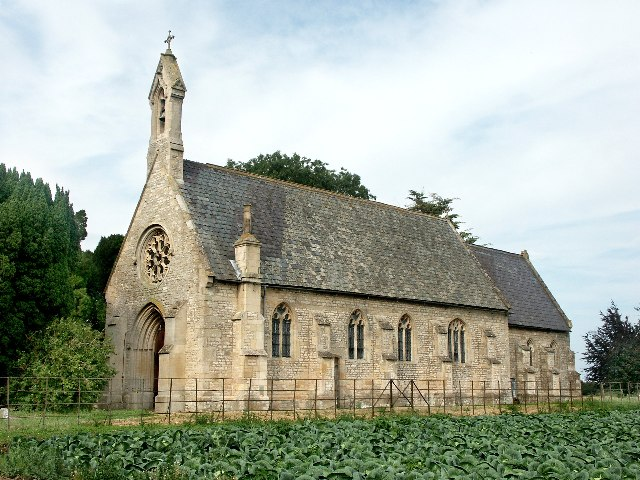
St Gilbert of Sempringham Church, Brothertoft

The Parish Council meets six times a year, and is responsible for the village hall in Brothertoft, the building that was once the school.

The mobile library visits Holland Fen once a month.

Public transport can be provided by the Call Connect on-demand bus service.

== Geography ==
The parish is a long, narrow, strip bounded on the north-east by the River Witham, and on the opposite edge by the 10 Foot Drain (between Sutterton Drove and Kirton Drove). It stretches from the A1121 road at Hubberts Bridge almost to Chapel Hill in the north, where the Kyme Eau forms the boundary. The land is flat. A landscape evaluation for Boston Borough called it "Flat and low-lying reclaimed fenland....semi-remote, tranquil and intact working agricultural landscape." There are no contours on the OS sheet, just spot heights on the roads of 2 or 3m above datum.

The geology is consistent with coastal marshes throughout this area. The bedrock is Jurassic sedimentary mudstones of the Ampthill series. The superficial overlay is of tidal deposits of clay and silt.

The landscape is described in Natural England's National landscape character survey as "a distinctive, historic and human-influenced wetland landscape lying to the west of the Wash estuary, which formerly constituted the largest wetland area in England. The area is notable for its large-scale, flat, open landscape with extensive vistas to level horizons. The level, open topography shapes the impression of huge skies which convey a strong sense of place, tranquility and inspiration."

== Places in the parish ==
Holland Fen with Brothertoft today comprises:

=== Settlements ===
- Holland Fen 53°01′13″N 0°08′52″W
- Brothertoft 52°59′50″N 0°06′19″W
- North Forty Foot Bank 52°43′57″N 0°30′38″W

=== Other Locations ===
- Pelhams Lands 53°03′20″N 0°11′01″W Former extra-parochial strip of reclaimed land, and a farm of the same name
- Harts Ground 53°03′45″N 0°11′56″W Former extra-parochial strip of reclaimed land, and a hamlet of the same name
- Boston West 52°59′36″N 0°04′24″W The extreme eastern extension of the parish
- Hedgehog Bridge 52°59′53″N 0°07′32″W Part of the settlement of North Forty Foot Bank, location of the school and the eponymous Bridge.
- Gill Bridge 53°00′48″N 0°09′05″W A pair of cottages, and the eponymous Bridge over an ancient waterway called Gill Syke.
- Toft Tunnel 52°59′14″N 0°06′32″W A Hamlet and a junction of drainage in North Forty Foot Bank, not to be confused with the similarly named railway tunnel and nature reserve near Bourne.
