= Pelhams Lands =

Part of the parish of Holland Fen with Brothertoft in Lincolnshire, England

Coordinates: 53.055454°N 0.183546°W

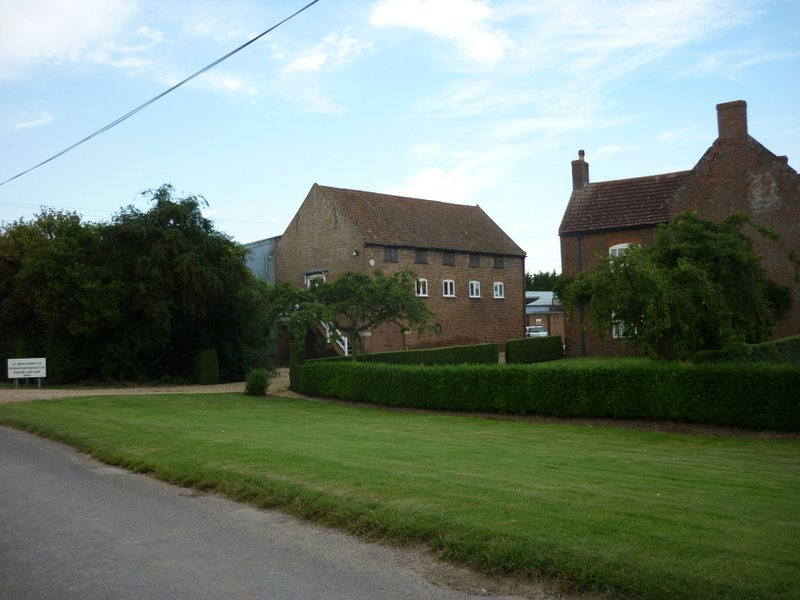
- Pelhams Land Farm

- Location within Lincolnshire
- OS grid reference: TF218524
  - London: 105 mi (169 km) S
- Civil parish: Holland Fen with Brothertoft
- District: Boston
- Shire county: Lincolnshire
- Region: East Midlands
- Country: England
- Sovereign state: United Kingdom
- Post town: Lincoln
- Postcode district: LN4
- Police: Lincolnshire
- Fire: Lincolnshire
- Ambulance: East Midlands
- UK Parliament: Boston and Skegness

Pelhams Lands or Pelhams Land is a former civil parish, now in the parish of Holland Fen with Brothertoft, in the Boston district, in Lincolnshire, England, approximately 8 miles (13 km) north-west from the town of Boston.

The name 'Pelhams Lands' originates from the Pelham family who held land here from 1602. Sir William Pelham owned a woad mill in this area. The lands were laid out after the drainage of Holland Fen by Act of Parliament in 1776. Pelhams-Lands was formerly an extra-parochial tract, in 1858 Pelhams Lands became a separate civil parish, on 1 April 1987 the parish was abolished to form Holland Fen with Brothertoft. Its population in 1831 was 41, and its 19th-century peak was in 1851 with 55. In 1971 it had a population of 64.

Pelhams Lands Farm is a late 18th-century red-brick farmhouse and is a Grade II listed building. There are two further Grade II listed 18th-century buildings on the Farm, a stable with granary and an earth closet.

There was a tower windmill at Pelhams Lands, built in 1838 to replace an earlier post mill which had blown down. The mill lost its cap in 1926, after which it was engine driven. Now mostly demolished, only a single derelict story remains.
