= Excell International School =

Former independent school in Lincolnshire

Location
- Tunnard Street; Boston, Lincolnshire, PE21 6PL; England
- Coordinates: 52°58′52″N 0°01′30″W

Information
- Type: Independent Day and Boarding School
- Established: 1851
- Founder: Martha and Mary Gee
- Closed: 16 July 2010
- Specialist: Sixth Form College
- Department for Education URN: 120734 Tables
- Ofsted: Reports
- Gender: 1851-1960s Girls; 1960s-2010 Co-educational
- Age: 3 to 18
- Website: web.archive.org/web/20080619132240/http://xl1884.co.uk

Excell International School was a small independent, co-educational, day and boarding school located in Boston, Lincolnshire, England for children aged between 3 and 18. An amalgamation of two previous schools, Conway School and Maypole House School. Parents were told in a letter that the school and the Chatterbox Nursery associated with it would close on 16 July 2010, as they had been suffering "financial difficulties due to dwindling numbers".

== History ==
=== Conway School ===
The school was established in 1851 by Martha and Mary Gee as Boston Middle Girls School at George Street, Boston and was "intended for female children whose parents are in the rank next above the actual poor". It subsequently moved to its current site at Tunnard Street, at a rebuilding cost of £800.

==== Head teacher controversy and problems with new ownership ====
Former owner and head teacher Simon McElwain was jailed for two years, in October 2007, after admitting the possession of child pornography images. He stepped down from his position in November 2004. Under McElwain the school had 140 pupils and employed 19 staff.

In April 2005 McElwain sold the school to David and Caroline Wilson. The new head teacher at this point was Philomena Rynne.

The pupil roll dropped after the transfer of ownership, and the school closed on 3 January 2007.

=== Maypole House school ===
Maypole House School was founded in 1884, occupying Well Vale Hall in Well near Alford. Maypole House school was sold in June in 2005 To Mr Omokhodion and Well Vale Hall was leased to the new owners of Maypole House school from 2005 to 2007 only. Maypole House received a Food Hygiene Award from the East Lindsey District Council in May 2006.

=== Merger ===
Conway School and Maypole House merged in January 2007 to form the Excell International College In Boston. They also started to take boarders and extended the age range of pupils from 3–18. In January 2008 it was announced that none of its students attained five or more A*-C GCSEs.
