= Kirkstead Abbey =

Monastery in Lincolnshire, England

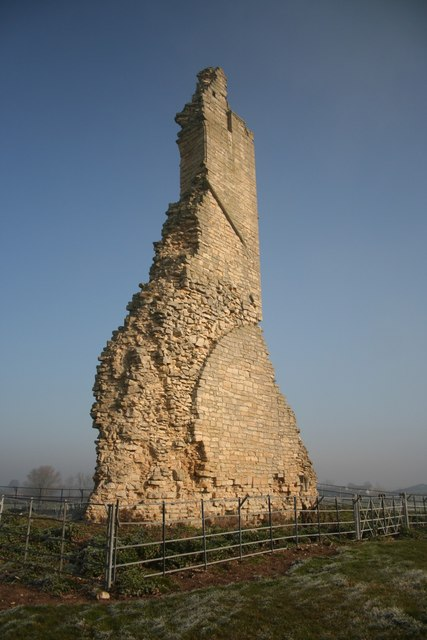
- Kirkstead Abbey ruin (February 2008)

- Location within Lincolnshire

Monastery information
- Order: Cistercian
- Established: 1139
- Disestablished: 1537

Architecture
- Status: Ruined
- Heritage designation: Scheduled Monument 1005050; Grade I listed building 1288192
- Completed date: 1187

Site
- Location: Woodhall Spa, East Lindsey, Lincolnshire
- Coordinates: 53.138463°N 0.223131°W

Kirkstead Abbey is a former Cistercian monastery in Kirkstead, Lincolnshire, England.

The monastery was founded in 1139 by Hugh Brito, (or Hugh son of Eudo), lord of Tattershall, and was originally colonised by an abbot and twelve monks from Fountains Abbey in Yorkshire. The original site was not large enough, however, and Robert, son of Hugh, found a better site a short distance away in 1187. The 1187 date is probably completion of the Abbey, as the architecture dates it to around 1175. The monks were granted the lordship of Wildmore by the lords of Bolingbroke, Scrivelsby and Horncastle, although they did retain the right of common pasture for themselves and their tenants.

The abbey remained in existence until 1537, when it was dissolved; the last abbot, Richard Harrison, and three of his monks were executed by Henry VIII following their implication (probably unjustly) in the Lincolnshire Rising of the previous year.

The land passed to the Duke of Suffolk and later to the Clinton Earls of Lincoln, who built a large country house. By 1791 that too had gone and all that remains today is a dramatic crag of masonry—a fragment of the south transept wall of the abbey church—and the earthworks of the vast complex of buildings that once surrounded it, which is Grade I listed, and an ancient scheduled monument.

The Monks Smithy House near Rotherham may have been established as a grange by the Abbey.

== Burials ==
- John Beke, 1st Baron Beke

== See also ==
- St. Leonard's Without (the 13th century chapel next to the abbey)
- Woodhall Spa
