= Holland Fen =

Settlement in the Borough of Boston, Lincolnshire, England

Coordinates: 53.020263°N 0.147807°W

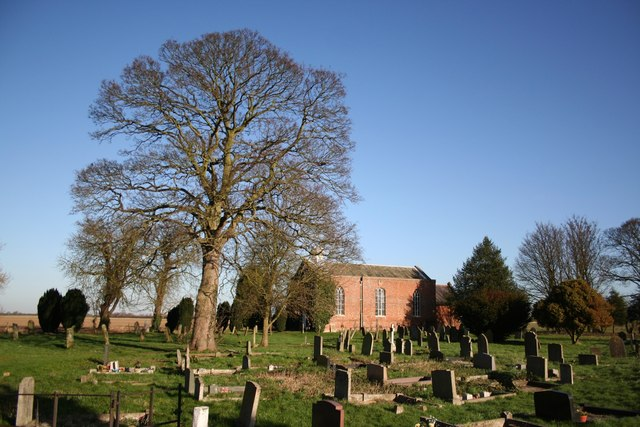
- All Saints' Church, Holland Fen

- Location within Lincolnshire
- OS grid reference: TF243486
  - London: 100 mi (160 km) S
- Civil parish: Holland Fen with Brothertoft
- District: Boston
- Shire county: Lincolnshire
- Region: East Midlands
- Country: England
- Sovereign state: United Kingdom
- Post town: Lincoln
- Postcode district: LN4
- Police: Lincolnshire
- Fire: Lincolnshire
- Ambulance: East Midlands
- UK Parliament: Boston and Skegness

Holland Fen is a settlement in the Borough of Boston, Lincolnshire, England. It is approximately 5 miles (8.0 km) north-west of the market town of Boston, and less than 1 mile (1.6 km) west of the River Witham.

== History ==
Holland Fen has been known as the Haute Huntre, or Eight Hundred Fen.

In 1720 Earl Fitzwilliam decided to drain the Holland Fen, having been frustrated by the local Commissioners of Sewers. He built the North Forty Foot Drain, which emptied by Lodowicks Gowt into the River Witham above Grand Sluice. The North Forty Foot was subsequently diverted to the South Forty Foot Drain at Cooks Lock and from there to Boston Haven through Black Sluice.

The Haute Huntre was drained and enclosed in 1767.

Holland Fen was an ecclesiastical parish created in 1812 and abolished in 1948. It is now part of the Holland Fen with Brothertoft parish.

Holland Fen consists of:

- Holland Fen
- Ferry Corner Plot
- River Bottom
- North Forty Foot Bank
- Hedgehog Bridge
- Toft Tunnel

== Church ==
The church is dedicated to All Saints and was built as a chapel of ease to Fosdyke in 1812. It was constructed of brick in Perpendicular style, with chancel and nave only, and bell turret. In 1964 Pevsner noted a chancel dated 1880, a west gallery on iron shafts, a pulpit with fluted pilasters, and a chalice probably by William Bell.

Today, All Saints' Church is part of the Holland Fen with Brothertoft Group, also known as "Five in the Fen" which also includes:

- Saint Gilbert Of Sempringham, Brothertoft
- Christ Church, Kirton Holme
- Saint Margaret of Scotland, Langrick
- Saint Peter, Wildmore

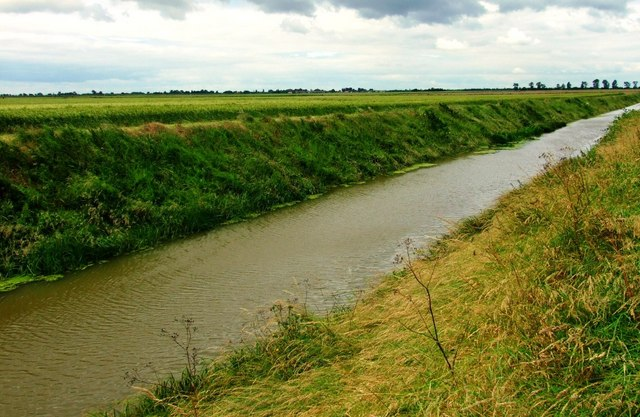
North Forty Foot Drain
