= Kirton, Lincolnshire =

Village and civil parish in Lincolnshire, England

Coordinates: 52.92782°N 0.05978°W

Kirton
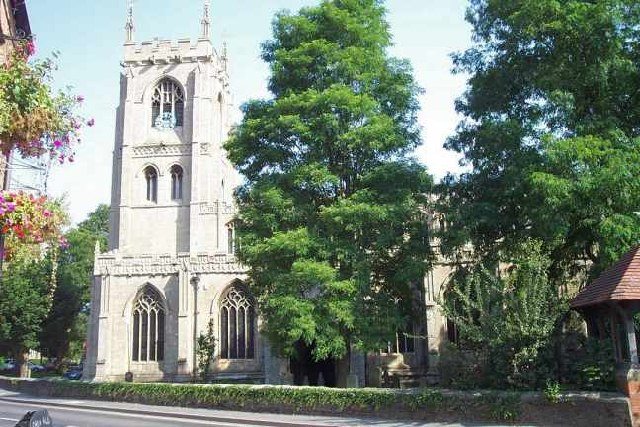
- Church of Saint Peter and Saint Paul

- Location within Lincolnshire
- Population: 5,371
- OS grid reference: TF304385
  - London: 100 mi (160 km) S
- District: Boston
- Shire county: Lincolnshire
- Region: East Midlands
- Country: England
- Sovereign state: United Kingdom
- Post town: BOSTON
- Postcode district: PE20
- Dialling code: 01205
- Police: Lincolnshire
- Fire: Lincolnshire
- Ambulance: East Midlands
- UK Parliament: Boston and Skegness

Kirton or Kirton in Holland is a village and civil parish in the Borough of Boston, Lincolnshire, England. It was historically a market town. The population of the civil parish at the 2011 census was 5,371.

== History ==
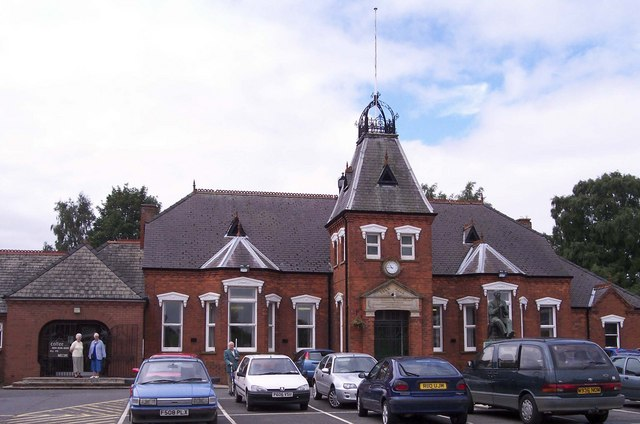
Kirton in Holland Town Hall

The Domesday Book of 1086 terms the village Cherchetune. It then had 52 households, with 30 freemen and 16 smallholders, 12 ploughlands, 10 plough teams, a meadow of 60 acres (24 ha), a church and two salt houses. In 1066 lordship of the manor was held by Earl Ralph. It had passed to Count Alan of Brittany by 1086.

In the reign of Elizabeth I, Kirton was reportedly the third largest settlement in Lincolnshire. At that time it was a market town. By the mid-19th century the market had ceased and Kirton had come to be generally described as a village rather than a town.

The 1885 Kelly's Directory recorded a Kirton railway station on the Great Northern Railway line between Boston and Spalding line. The station closed in 1961.

There existed in the 19th century Congregational and Wesleyan chapels and almshouses for four poor women. A Gas Consumers' Company Ltd formed in 1865. The main landowners were the Mercers' Company, Sir Thomas Whichcote DL, E. R. C. Cust DL, the Very Rev. Arthur Percival Purey-Cust DD, and Samuel Smeeton, whose residence was the "modern white building" of D'Eyncourt Hall. The crops grown in the 8,962 acres (3,627 ha) parish were wheat, beans and potatoes. There was a "large quantity of pasture land" and 676 acres (274 ha) of marsh land. The 1881 the ecclesiastical parish population was 2,011, that of the civil parish, 2,580. Kirton in Holland Town Hall was opened in August 1912.

=== Church ===
The parish church is dedicated to St Peter and St Paul. The transepts had double aisles like those of Algarkirk and Spalding, but, in 1804, the central tower and transepts were pulled down and the chancel shortened, the architect (Hayward) using gunpowder to remove the tower. This was completed by 1809. In 1900 a restoration of the rebuilt church was undertaken by the architect Hodgson Fowler.

=== Grammar school ===
Middlecott's Charities Act 1623
- Act of Parliament
- Parliament of England
- Long title: An Act for erecting a free school, an almshouse, and an house of correction within the county of Lincoln.
- Citation: 21 Jas. 1. c. 8 Pr.
- Territorial extent: England and Wales

Dates
- Royal assent: 29 May 1624
- Commencement: 12 February 1624 (Note: Start of session.)

Status: Current legislation

In 1624, Thomas (later Sir Thomas) Middlecott was empowered by a private act of Parliament, Middlecott's Charities Act 1623 (21 Jas. 1. c. 8 Pr.), to found a free grammar school for teaching the Latin and Greek languages and providing English commercial and agricultural education to children from the parishes of Kirton, Sutterton, Algarkirk and Fosdyke. By 1835, the school had 40 pupils, some attending free and some paying fees. The master (headmaster) appointed in 1773, Rev. Charles Wildbore (c. 1736–1802), and later his son by the same name (1767–1842), were later accused of diverting surplus income from the school's endowments for their own use and failing to keep up educational standards. This culminated in a parliamentary report, and ultimately a restructuring of the school management in 1851. By 1885, William Cochran was master and a new school house had been built next to his house. Under a scheme of the Endowed Schools Act 1869, amended in 1898, the school ranked as a "second-grade" grammar school.

In the 1830s, Kirton gained a girls' school for 14 day and boarding pupils, and a Sunday School for 32 boys and 16 girls.

Kirton now has a secondary school called Thomas Middlecott Academy.

=== The Old King's Head ===
The Old King's Head is a former public house listed as a Grade II historic building. The earlier part of it was built at the end of the 16th century. It underwent major alterations in 1661 in Artisan Mannerist Style. It is red brick in English bond, with recent tiles on a former thatched roof. It became a domestic residence in the 1960s, but had fallen into disrepair and was purchased in 2016 by Heritage Lincolnshire, which has assigned over £2 million for its restoration.

It re-opened as a café and bed & breakfast on 1 October 2021.

== Geography ==
Kirton is on the main A16, B1397 and B1192 roads south of Boston, near Frampton and Sutterton. Several villages and hamlets take their name from Kirton, including Kirton Holme, Kirton End, Kirton Meeres, Kirton Fen, Kirton Skeldyke, and Kirton Marsh.

Kirton railway station opened in 1848 on the Lincolnshire Loop Line from Boston to Spalding. It closed to passengers in 1961 and for freight in 1964. The modern A16 road follows the course of the dismantled railway past Kirton, and runs through the old station site.

== Kirton Meres ==
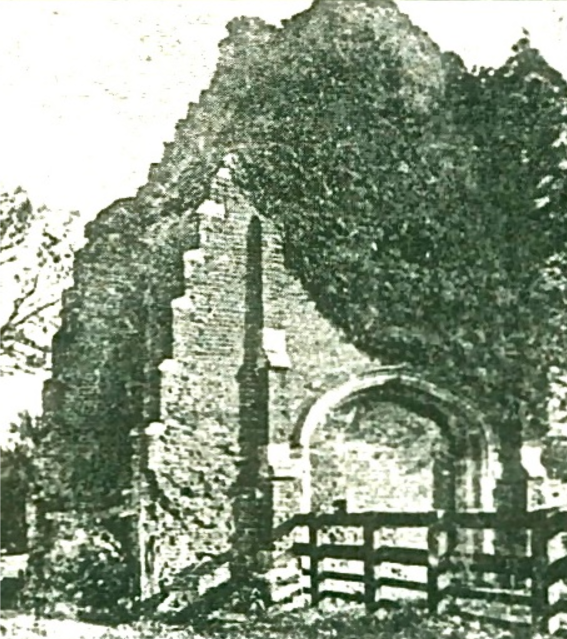
Kirton Meres Gatehouse in 1893

The parish contained the ancient manor of Kirton Meres, the seat of Roger de Kirton (d. 1383), alias de Kirketon / Roger de Meres / Meeres), a Justice of the Common Pleas (1371–1380). The manor house (later known as "Orme Hall") was demolished in 1818 but the arched gatehouse (Porter's Lodge, built of brick, guard room, and chambers over it, with stone dressings, windows, archway, door-ways, and copings, surmounted by highly pitched step gables, with 15 sculpted heraldic shields, some now held by the Spalding Gentlemen's Society, Broad Street, Spalding, Lincs) survived until 1925 on the south side of the Willington Road, one mile west of the centre of Kirton. Another of this family resident at Kirton Meres was the churchman Francis Meres (1565–1647).

== Governance ==
There are three tiers of local government covering Kirton, at parish, district and county level: Kirton Parish Council, Boston Borough Council, and Lincolnshire County Council. The parish council generally meets at Kirton Town Hall.

Kirton was an ancient parish and gave its name to the larger Kirton Wapentake within the Parts of Holland, one of the three traditional subdivisions of Lincolnshire. When elected parish and district councils were established in 1894, Kirton was given a parish council and included in the Boston Rural District. The rural district was replaced by the larger borough of Boston as part of local government reorganisation in 1974, which also saw the Holland County Council that had been established in 1889 replaced by Lincolnshire County Council.

Kirton falls within the drainage area of the Black Sluice Internal Drainage Board.

== Research centre ==
The former Kirton Research Centre was nearby. Ownership of the 120-acre (0.49 km^{2}) centre for horticultural research was transferred from the Department for Environment, Food and Rural Affairs to the University of Warwick in April 2004 and it became part of Horticulture Research International. In August 2009 the University closed it, as public and private funding fell £2 million short of covering its annual running costs.

== Notable people ==
In order of birth:

- Francis Meres (1565/1566 – 1647), churchman and author
- Joseph Gilbert (1732–1821), born in Kirton, was Master of HMS Resolution on Cook's second voyage.
- Dame Sarah Swift (1854–1937), born in Kirton Skeldyke, set up the Royal College of Nursing.
- Harold Jackson VC (31 May 1892 – 24 August 1918), a sergeant in The East Yorkshire Regiment who received the Victoria Cross in 1917 and was killed a year later, came from Allandale, Kirton.
- Oliver "Ollie" Ryan (born 1985), footballer, attended Kirton Primary School.

== See also ==
- Attorney General v Davy (1741) 26 ER 531, a leading legal case in UK company law
