= The Workhouse, Southwell =

Former workhouse in Nottinghamshire, England

Coordinates: 53.0810°N 0.9393°W

The Workhouse
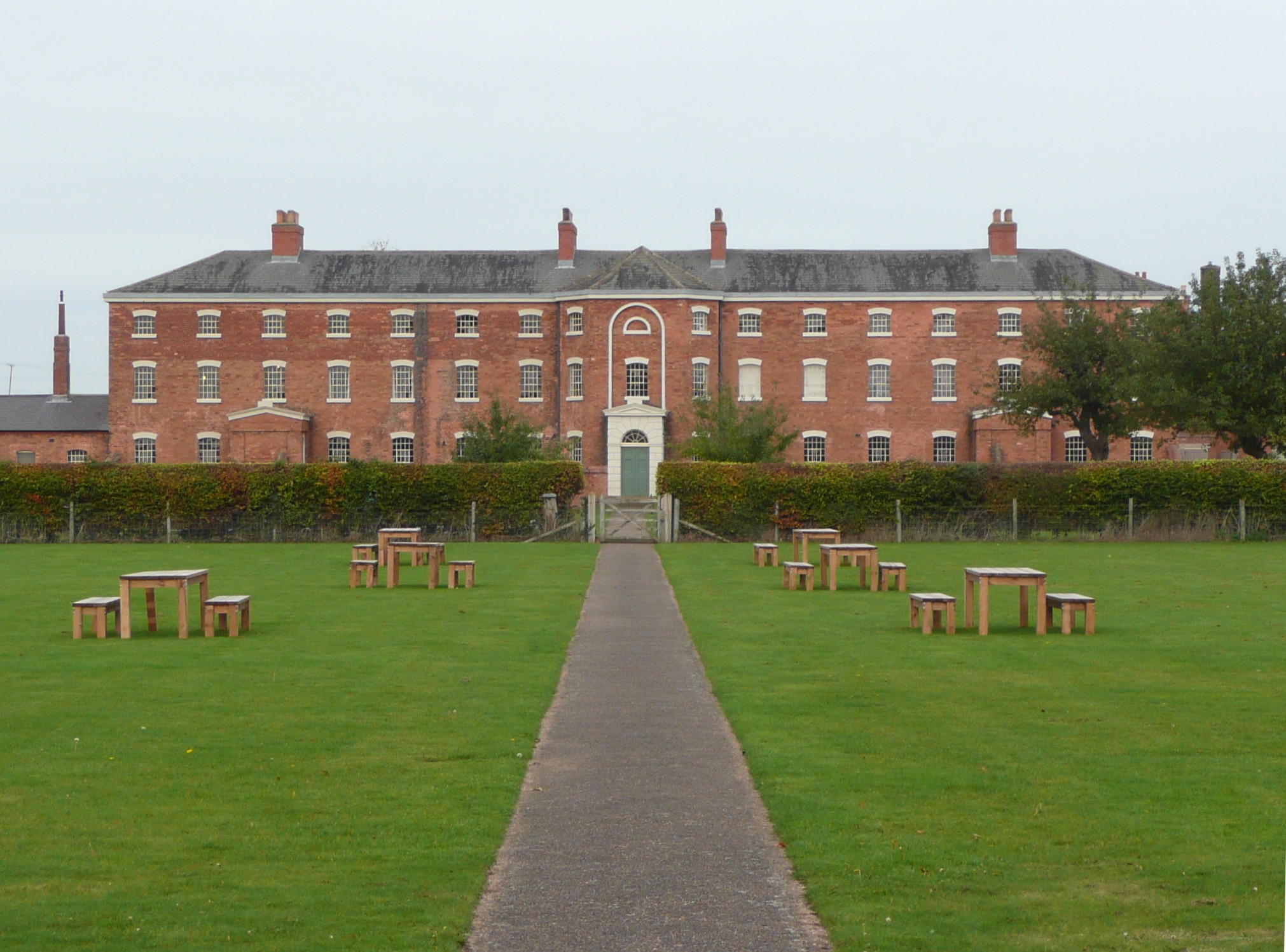
- South view of the Workhouse

- Location within Nottinghamshire
- Type: Workhouse
- Location: Upton Road, Southwell, Nottinghamshire, NG25 0PT
- OS grid reference: SK 71152 54284

History
- Built: 1824
- Built for: John Thomas Becher

Site notes
- Area: Nottinghamshire
- Architect: William Adams Nicholson
- Owner: National Trust
- Website: www.nationaltrust.org.uk/visit/nottinghamshire-lincolnshire/the-workhouse-and-infirmary

Listed Building – Grade II
- Official name: Greet House
- Designated: 8 May 2000
- Reference no.: 1045931

The Workhouse, officially known as Greet House, and alternatively as Southwell Union Workhouse, or Thurgaton Incorporation Workhouse, in the town of Southwell, Nottinghamshire, England, is a museum operated by the National Trust, opened to the public in 2002. Built in 1824, it was the prototype of the 19th-century workhouse, and was cited by the Royal Commission on the poor law as the best example among the existing workhouses, before the resulting New Poor Law of 1834 led to the construction of workhouses across the country.

It was designed by William Adams Nicholson, an architect of Southwell and Lincoln, together with the Revd. John T. Becher, a pioneer of workhouse and prison reform involving daily tasks of hard labour by breaking stones and recycling of oakum. It is described by the National Trust as the best-preserved workhouse in England.

The building remained in use until the early 1990s, when it was used to provide temporary accommodation for mothers and children. Its acquisition by the National Trust reflected the organisation's wish to broaden its interests and to ensure the continued existence of a Grade II* listed building that was potentially to be turned into residential flats.

Restoration work began with roof repairs 14 July 2000 and is ongoing as of 2025 as part of the long-term conservation programme. Many rooms have been redecorated as they would have looked in the 19th century and buildings, walls and privies, which had been demolished in the 20th century, have been reinstated.

The laundry drying room was opened in March 2012, coinciding with long-service presentations to staff and volunteers by (then) National Trust director-general, Fiona Reynolds.

In 2013, the site received the Sandford Award for Heritage Education, as a learning-facility for local schoolchildren.

In 2015 the property was featured in 24 Hours in the Past.

== See also ==
- Grade II* listed buildings in Nottinghamshire
- Listed buildings in Upton, Newark and Sherwood
