= All Saints Church, Haugham =

Coordinates: 53.3127°N 0.0034°E

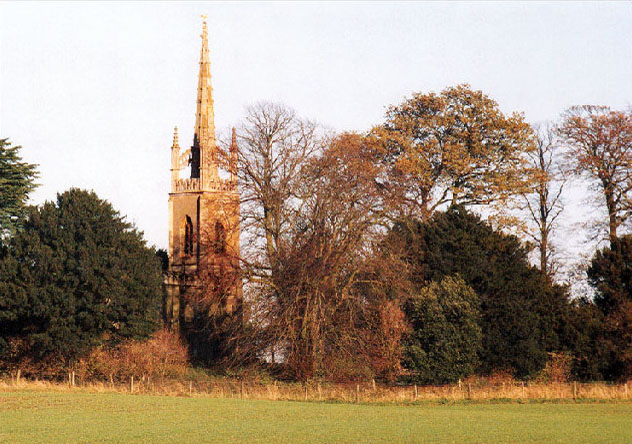
- Tower and spire of All Saints Church, Haugham

- Location in Lincolnshire
- OS grid reference: TF 330 810
- Location: Haugham, Lincolnshire
- Country: England
- Denomination: Anglican
- Website: Churches Conservation Trust

Architecture
- Functional status: Redundant
- Heritage designation: Grade II*
- Designated: 9 March 1967
- Architect: W. A. Nicholson
- Architectural type: Church
- Style: Gothic Revival
- Groundbreaking: 1837
- Completed: 1840

Specifications
- Materials: Rendered brick and green sandstone rubble Roofs slated

All Saints Church is a former Anglican church in the village of Haugham, Lincolnshire, England. It is recorded in the National Heritage List for England as a designated Grade II* listed building, and is under the care of The Churches Conservation Trust. The church stands on the southwestern edge of the village, 4 miles (6 km) south of Louth, to the west of the A16 road.

== History ==
The church was built between 1837 and 1840 on the site of an earlier church, and was designed by William Adams Nicholson. It was declared "redundant" in May 1981.

== Architecture ==
=== Exterior ===
All Saints is constructed in rendered brick and green sandstone rubble. The roofs are slated. It is a small church seating only about 80 people. Its plan consists of a nave with a south porch, a chancel, and a west tower with a spire. The whole church stands on a plinth. The tower is supported by diagonal buttresses, and has a pointed west window with two lights. There are two-light pointed bell openings on each side. The parapet consists of pierced battlements containing tracery, and it has ornate corner pinnacles. The tower is surmounted by a recessed octagonal spire, supported by ornate flying buttresses, and is decorated with crockets. The spire is said to echo the similar but larger spire of St. James Church in Louth.

Along the north side of the nave are three two-light pointed windows, alternating with four buttresses that are surmounted by ornate pinnacles. Along the top of the nave are moulded eaves and battlements. In the north wall of the chancel is a single narrow pointed window. At the east end are angle buttresses with pinnacles, and a three-light pointed window. Over this is an ornate parapet with a corbel head and a cross finial. The south wall of the chancel has a single narrow window, and in the south wall of the nave are two two-light pointed windows. The porch is gabled and has single-light windows in its east and west sides. It has moulded eaves, an ornate parapet with a finial, and pinnacles.

=== Interior ===
Flanking the chancel arch are boards painted with the Ten Commandments, and over the arch are the Royal arms of Queen Victoria. The pews date from the 19th century, and are carved with poppyheads. There are two box pews, one of which incorporates the pulpit and the lectern. The choir stalls, altar rail and reredos are all from the 19th century, as is the stained glass, which includes a copy of The Light of the World by Holman Hunt. There are some older fittings moved from the previous church. These date from the 15th century, and are an octagonal font, and another smaller font or a stoup. The memorials date from the 18th and 19th centuries.

== See also ==
- List of churches preserved by the Churches Conservation Trust in the East of England
