= Maidenwell =

Maidenwell may refer to:

- Maidenwell, Lincolnshire, England
- Maidenwell, Queensland, Australia
