= Oxcombe =

Village in Lincolnshire, England

Coordinates: 53.275515°N 0.035151°W

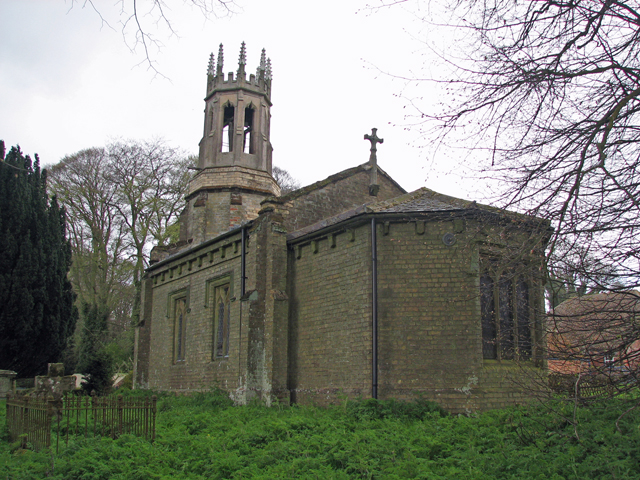
- All Saints' Church, Oxcombe

- Location within Lincolnshire
- OS grid reference: TF311771
  - London: 120 mi (190 km) S
- Civil parish: Maidenwell
- District: East Lindsey
- Shire county: Lincolnshire
- Region: East Midlands
- Country: England
- Sovereign state: United Kingdom
- Post town: HORNCASTLE
- Postcode district: LN9
- Dialling code: 01507
- Police: Lincolnshire
- Fire: Lincolnshire
- Ambulance: East Midlands
- UK Parliament: Louth and Horncastle

Oxcombe is a small village in the civil parish of Maidenwell, in the East Lindsey district of Lincolnshire, England. It is situated 3 miles (5 km) west from the A16 road, 6 miles (10 km) south from Louth and 6 miles north-east from Horncastle.

Oxcombe was previously a parish in its own right, although small; in the 1870s it comprised 27 people and 4 houses

In 1931 the parish had a population of 47. On 1 April 1936 the parish was abolished to form Maidenwell.

To the south of Oxcombe lies the parish of Worlaby and to the east, that of Ruckland.

The parish name may have been derived from the Old English oxa+coomb which means ox valley.

== All Saints Church ==
Built in 1842 and attributed to the architect William Adams Nicholson of Lincoln. The church is similar in style to other churches in the vicinity - Haugham, Raithby and Biscathorpe also by Nicholson. A small church, built in brick with an octagonal west tower, which also forms the porch to the church It has a two bay nave with a chancel with a three sided apse. The bell stage of the tower is an open stone lantern with cast-iron pinnacles. The interior of the church cottons a fine series of Monuments to the Grant family. The church was declared redundant in 1980 and is in the care of the Lincolnshire Old Churches Trust.

== Oxcombe House ==
Also in the style of Nicholson. Built in 1845. Tudoresque, with mullioned and transomed windows. Buttresses crowned by turrets on either side of the porch.

== Literature ==
- Antram N (revised), Pevsner N & Harris J, (1989), The Buildings of England: Lincolnshire, Yale University Press.
