= Upton, Newark and Sherwood =

Village in Nottinghamshire, England

Coordinates: 53.082°N 0.903°W

Upton
- Village and civil parish
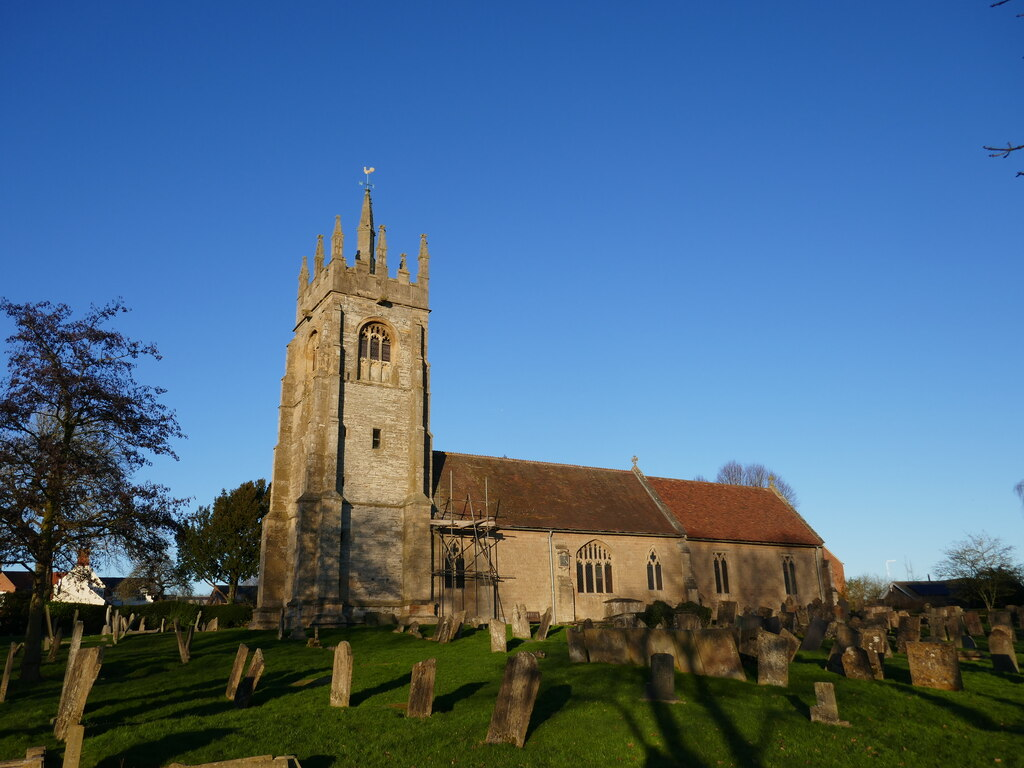
- Church of St. Peter and St. Paul, Upton

- Location within Nottinghamshire
- Interactive map of Upton
- Area: 2.32 sq mi (6.0 km^{2})
- Population: 419 (2021)
  - Density: 181/sq mi (70/km^{2})
- OS grid reference: SK 736544
  - London: 110 mi (180 km) SE
- District: Newark and Sherwood
- Shire county: Nottinghamshire
- Region: East Midlands
- Country: England
- Sovereign state: United Kingdom
- Post town: NEWARK
- Postcode district: NG23
- Dialling code: 01636
- Police: Nottinghamshire
- Fire: Nottinghamshire
- Ambulance: East Midlands
- UK Parliament: Newark

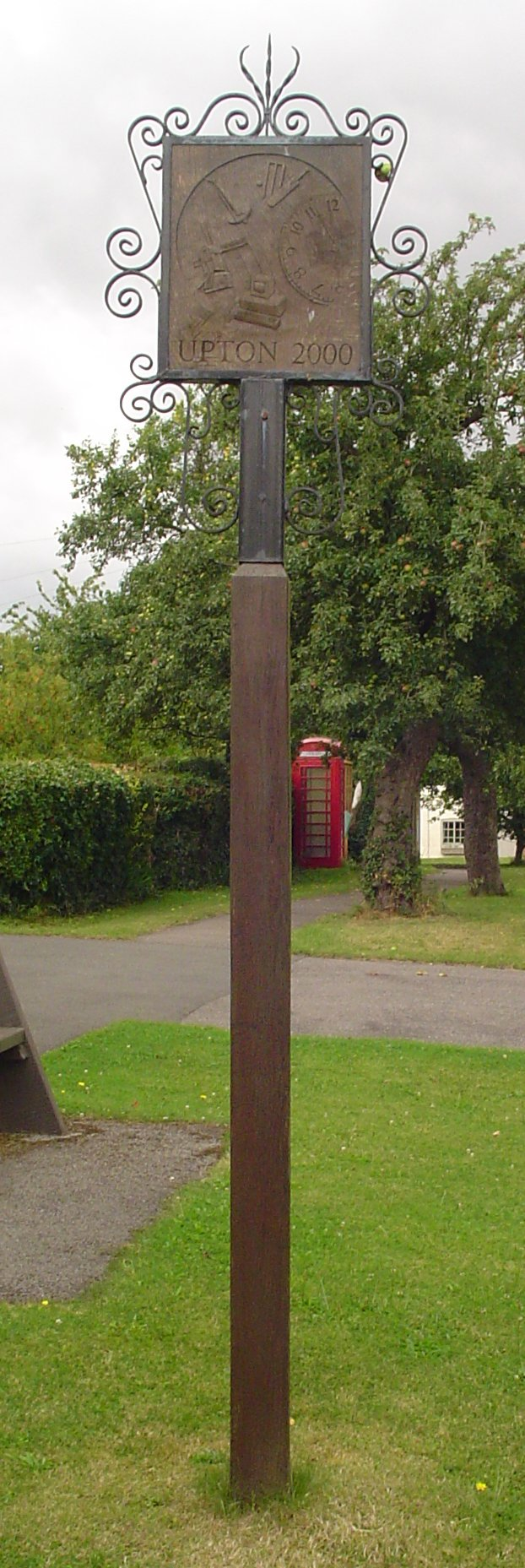
Signpost in Upton

Upton is a small village in Nottinghamshire, England, 2 miles (3.2 km) east of Southwell, 5 miles (8.0 km) west of Newark and 3 miles (4.8 km) south of Hockerton; it lies on the A612 Nottingham-Newark road. In 1889, the village was described as sitting on a bend in the main road, "on the summit of a hill which commands a fine view of the Trent Valley.... The church, which is a prominent feature in the landscape, has a substantial Perpendicular tower crowned by eight pinnacles, and having in the centre a lofty master pinnacle which rises above its neighbours, and so adds materially to the effect."

The village had a population of 425 at the 2011 census, falling slightly to 419 at the 2021 census. The parish church of St Peter and St Paul is 13th century, built in the Perpendicular style. The tower of the church was also used as a dovecote. There is also a village hall and a public house (The Cross Keys). It is also the home of the British Horological Institute based at Upton Hall. The Clock House, a tea room, is located next to the Hall. What once was the village shop is now a private house. Upton Mill was a wooden post mill built c. 1814. Still in use in 1905 the body of the mill had gone by 1911, the roundhouse being re-roofed and retained as a store.

== Historical ==
In the 1640s the jobs of the village were shared between the families who lived there. Some detail exists of this as the farmer and recent widow Jane Kitchen became the village's constable in 1644. She had the responsibility of the job although she employed William Chappell to do any public tasks. It was a tricky time as the country was at war. Nearby Nottingham was for the parliamentarians and Newark Royalists. Sir John Meldrum laid siege to Newark and Kitchen had the task of sending hens and calves from her own and her neighbours when the siege ended Lord Loughborough troops required feeding. Kitchen kept detailed notes and someone else took over the following year.

In 1852, Upton was described as "a handsome village and parish, pleasantly situated on a gentle declivity, two and a half miles east of Southwell. Its parish is in the liberty of Southwell and Scrooby, and contains 640 inhabitants and 1,408 acres (5.70 km^{2}) of land, enclosed in 1795, and exonerated from tithes by allotments to the vicar and appropriator. The Rev. J. Banks Wright is lord of the manor, and owner of about 60 acres (24 ha) of land. There are a few other small freeholders, but it is mostly copyhold under the Archbishop, or leasehold under the Chapter of Southwell. The latter are appropriators and patrons of the vicarage, which is valued in the King's books at £4 11s 5½d, now at £91, and is enjoyed by the Rev. Frederick William Naylor, who erected a neat Sunday School in the village, and resides at the vicarage house, a neat mansion erected a few years ago. The church is a small gothic fabric, dedicated to St Peter, with a chancel and handsome tower, in which are four bells. There is a small Methodist chapel. Upton Hall is the delightful seat of the Dowager Lady Galway. It is a large, elegant mansion, surrounded by pleasure grounds, from which extensive and beautiful prospects are seen. It was built by the late Thomas Wright Esq., on the site of the old manor house. J.C. Wood of Normanton, and W. Esam of Averham Park have estates here."

== Notable residents ==
- Fiona Thornewill, the explorer who skied to the South Pole
- Siân Welby (born 1986) Television presenter and radio host was brought up in the village.

== See also ==
- Listed buildings in Upton, Newark and Sherwood
