= St Peter and St Paul's Church, Upton =

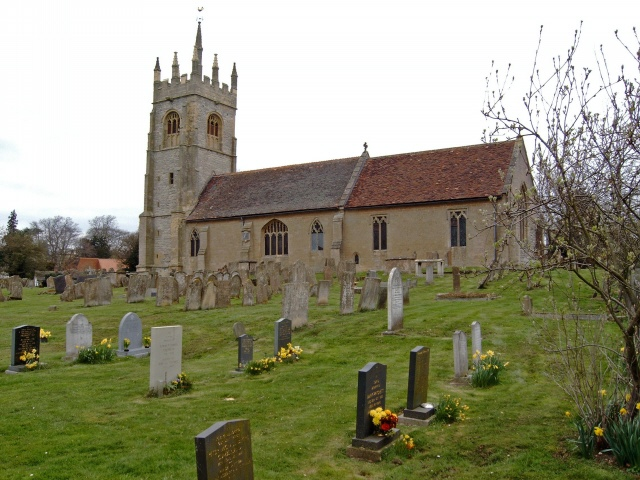
- St Peter and St Paul's Church, Upton
- St Peter and St Paul's Church, Upton
- 53°4′47.86″N 0°54′9.84″W
- OS grid reference: SK 73677 54271
- Location: Upton, Newark and Sherwood
- Country: England
- Denomination: Church of England

History
- Founded: 1250
- Dedication: St Peter and St Paul

Architecture
- Heritage designation: Grade I listed

Administration
- Diocese: Diocese of Southwell and Nottingham
- Archdeaconry: Newark
- Deanery: Newark and Southwell
- Parish: Upton

St Peter and St Paul's Church is a Grade I listed parish church in the Church of England in Upton, Newark and Sherwood, Nottinghamshire.

== History ==
The church dates from the 13th century. It was restored in 1820, 1867 and then in 1893 by Charles Hodgson Fowler.

The church is in a joint parish with:

- St Denis' Church, Morton
- Holy Trinity Church, Rolleston

== Organ ==
The current organ dates from 1900 and was built by Gray and Davison. A specification of the organ can be found on the National Pipe Organ Register.

== See also ==
- Grade I listed buildings in Nottinghamshire
- Listed buildings in Upton, Newark and Sherwood
