= Upton Hall, Nottinghamshire =

Listed building in Nottinghamshire, England

Upton Hall
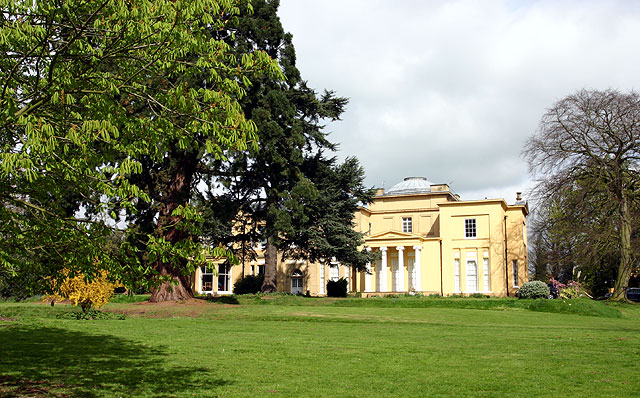

- Location within Nottinghamshire

General information
- Architectural style: Greek Revival
- Coordinates: 53.082672°N 0.904158°W
- Year built: 1828–32
- Renovated: 1895
- Client: Thomas Wright (1773–1845)

Design and construction
- Architect: W. J. Donthome

Listed Building – Grade II*
- Official name: Upton Hall
- Designated: 7 August 1952
- Reference no.: 1179760

Upton Hall is the headquarters of the British Horological Institute (BHI) in Upton, Newark and Sherwood, Nottinghamshire, England. It has been the headquarters since 1972. It also houses the Museum of Timekeeping consisting of a substantial collection of clocks, watches and also a library. The museum is open to the public during seasonal summer opening hours, for special events and for pre-booked group tours.

== History ==
The hall was built in 1828–32 by Thomas Wright (1773–1845), a banker of Nottinghamshire. It was designed by the architect William Donthorne.

The hall was purchased in 1895 by John Warwick, a brewer of the firm 'Warwick & Richardson' based in Newark. He used it as a family home. He added a ballroom, a billiard room, and a further six bedrooms. In 1936 the property was bought by Sir Albert Ball, though he never took up residence there.

In 1952 the hall was declared a listed building. It is now designated as Grade II*, for particularly important buildings of more than special interest.

The property is listed by Historic England on the Heritage at Risk Register. Roof coverings are in fair condition but rainwater disposal is poor, with corresponding internal dampness and signs of active dry rot. The adjacent stables and courtyard structures contribute to the setting of the hall and are now in very poor condition and all at significant risk of loss.

The building was purchased by the British Horological Institute (BHI) in 1972, where its headquarters have been ever since.

=== Owners ===
- Thomas and Frances Wright, 1828–1845
- Revd. Joseph Banks Wright and Sophia Wright, 1845
- Philip Richard Falkner and Alicia Falkner, 1857–1888
- Mary Frances Falkner, 1888–1894
- John Francis Warwick and Eliza Gertrude Warwick, 1895–1935
- Sir Albert Ball, 1936–1939
- Holy Ghost Fathers (Roman Catholic College), 1939–1972
- British Horological Institute, 1972–present

== See also ==
- Grade II* listed buildings in Nottinghamshire
- Listed buildings in Upton, Newark and Sherwood
