= William Adams Nicholson =

English architect (1803–1853)

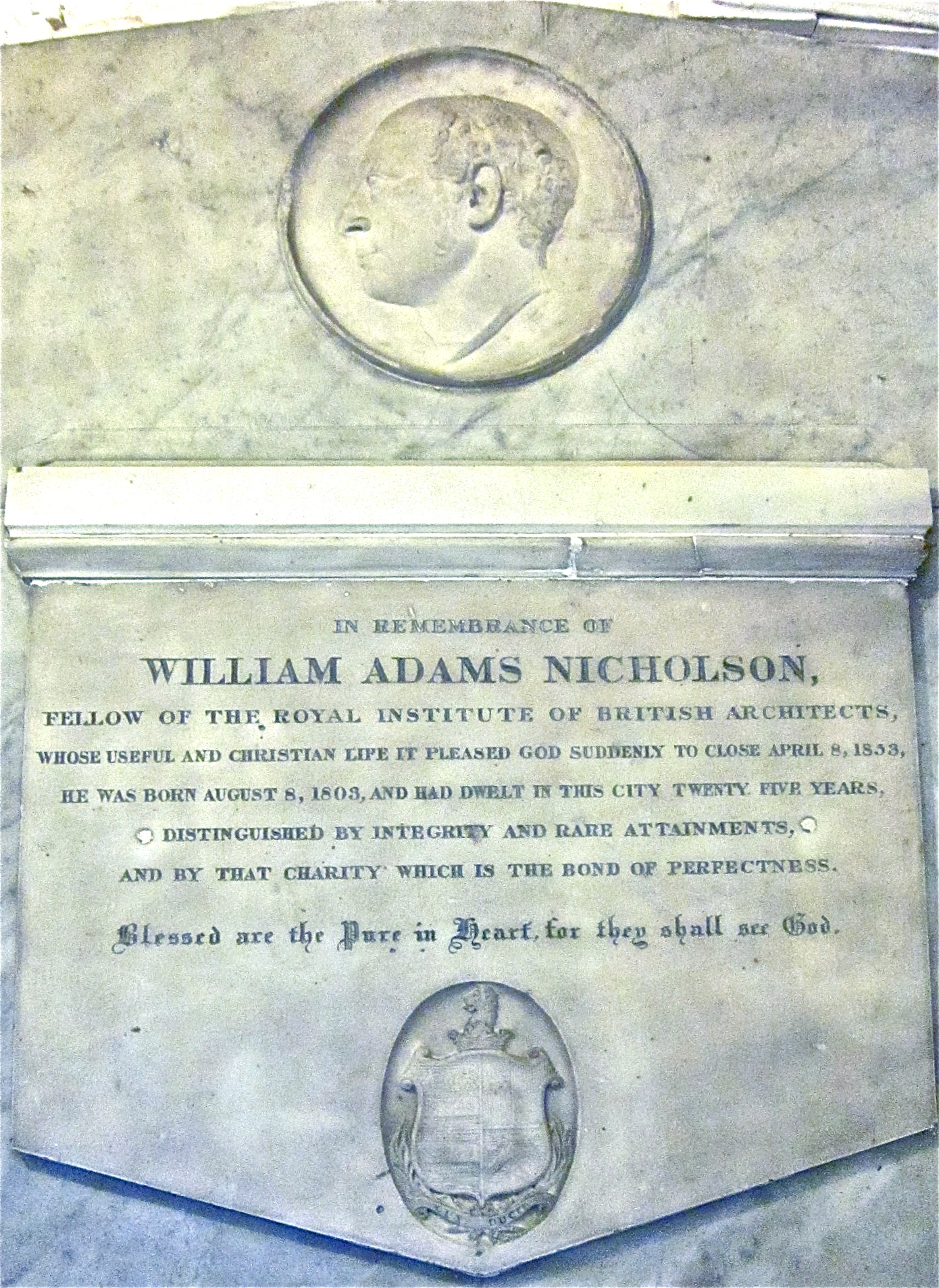
- Memorial to W. A. Nicholson in St Benedict's Church, Lincoln
- Born: 8 August 1803; Southwell, Nottinghamshire
- Died: 8 April 1853 (aged 49); Boston, Lincolnshire
- Education: Pupil of John Buonarotti Papworth, 1821-1824
- Occupation: Architect
- Practice: In Lincoln from 1828
- Buildings: Mansfield Town Hall, Bayons Manor
- Projects: Estate Village at Blankney, Lincolnshire

William Adams Nicholson (8 August 1803 – 8 April 1853) was an English architect who worked in Lincoln and was a founding member of the Royal Institute of British Architects.

== Life ==
Born on 8 August 1803 at Southwell, Nottinghamshire, he was the son of James Nicholson, a carpenter and joiner. James gave up his business about 1838 and became sub-agent to Sir Richard Sutton's estates in Nottinghamshire and Norfolk. William was articled about July 1821, for three years, to John Buonarotti Papworth, architect, of London. By 1824 Nicholson had returned to Southwell, where he worked with the Rev J. T.Becher on the design of the Southwell Workhouse. In 1828 he established himself at Lincoln and he built up an extensive practice in Lincolnshire and Nottinghamshire. From 1839 to 1846 he was in partnership as Nicholson & Goddard, with Henry Goddard (1813–1899). Pupils of the practice were Augustus Hullock Morant, a relative of Nicholson's, Charles Baily of Newark and London, and Michael Drury who was Nicholson's successor. His assistant John Spence Hardy and another pupil, Pearson Bellamy set up the practice of Bellamy and Hardy in Lincoln after his death.

Nicholson joined the Royal Institute of British Architects as a founding fellow at its commencement. He was a member of the Lincolnshire Literary Society, and of the Lincolnshire Topographical Society. He was in attendance at Boston as a professional witness when he was suddenly taken ill, and died there on 8 April 1853. He was buried at Lincoln, in the churchyard of St. Swithin, in the parish where he had resided for many years.

=== Family ===
In 1824 Nicholson married Leonora, the youngest daughter of William Say of Norton Street, London. His second wife, Anne Tallant, survived him and was living at No. 1 Bank Street Lincoln in 1856.

== Architectural works ==
=== Workhouses ===
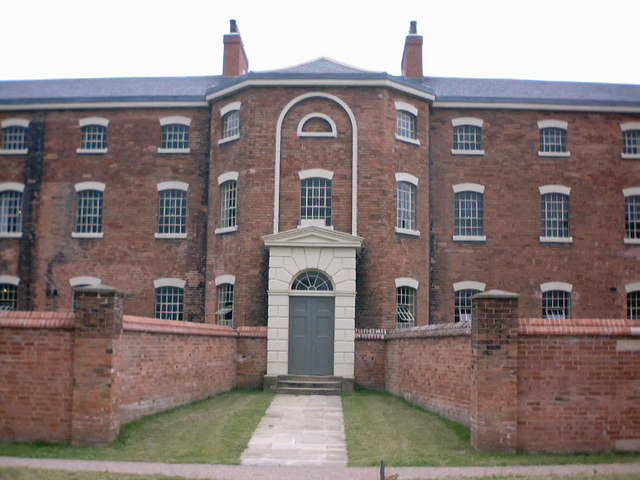
Southwell - Workhouse, 1824

Possibly Nicholson's most important contribution was in the design of Workhouses. His pioneering Southwell Workhouse (1824) was important forerunner of the radially planned workhouses of the New Poor Law. Nicholson was to go on to design workhouses at Glanford Brigg in 1836 and at Lincoln in 1837-1838 - both of which have now been demolished.

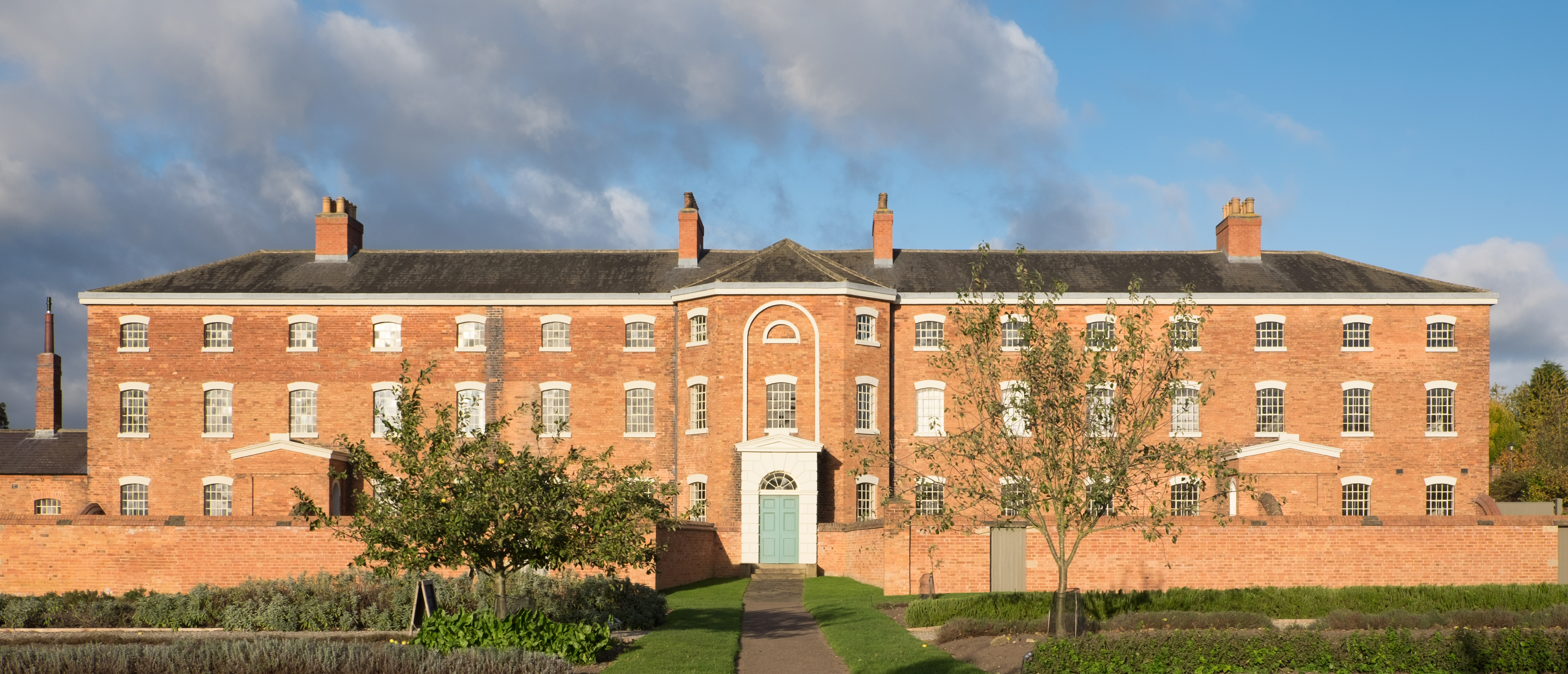
Southwell Workhouse as restored in 2016

- Southwell Workhouse
- Glanford-Brigg Workhouse
- Lincoln Workhouse. Lincoln Union Workhouse was erected between 1837 and 1838.

=== Public buildings ===
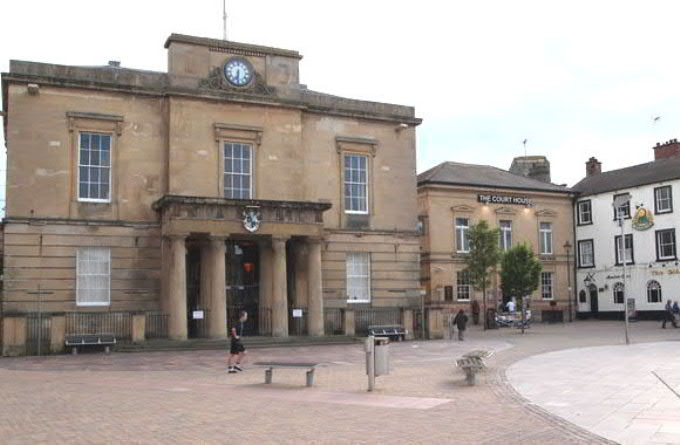
Mansfield Old Town Hall and Old Court

As well as working in the Gothic Revival style of architecture, Nicholson could also work very effectively in classical styles. He designed the Mansfield Town Hall in a Grecian style portico with Doric columns. More striking is the Corn Exchange of 1847 in the Cornhill Lincoln. Here he has a projecting portico with Corinthian columns at Piano nobile level.

- Mansfield Town Hall. 1836. In a heavy neo-classical style with a four column Tuscan porch.
- The Nottingham Dispensary, No 12. Broad Street, Nottingham. 1841-3. Classical rendered front with full-height ionic pilasters above a rusticated ground floor.
- Mayor's Parlour, added the Stonebow, Lincoln.
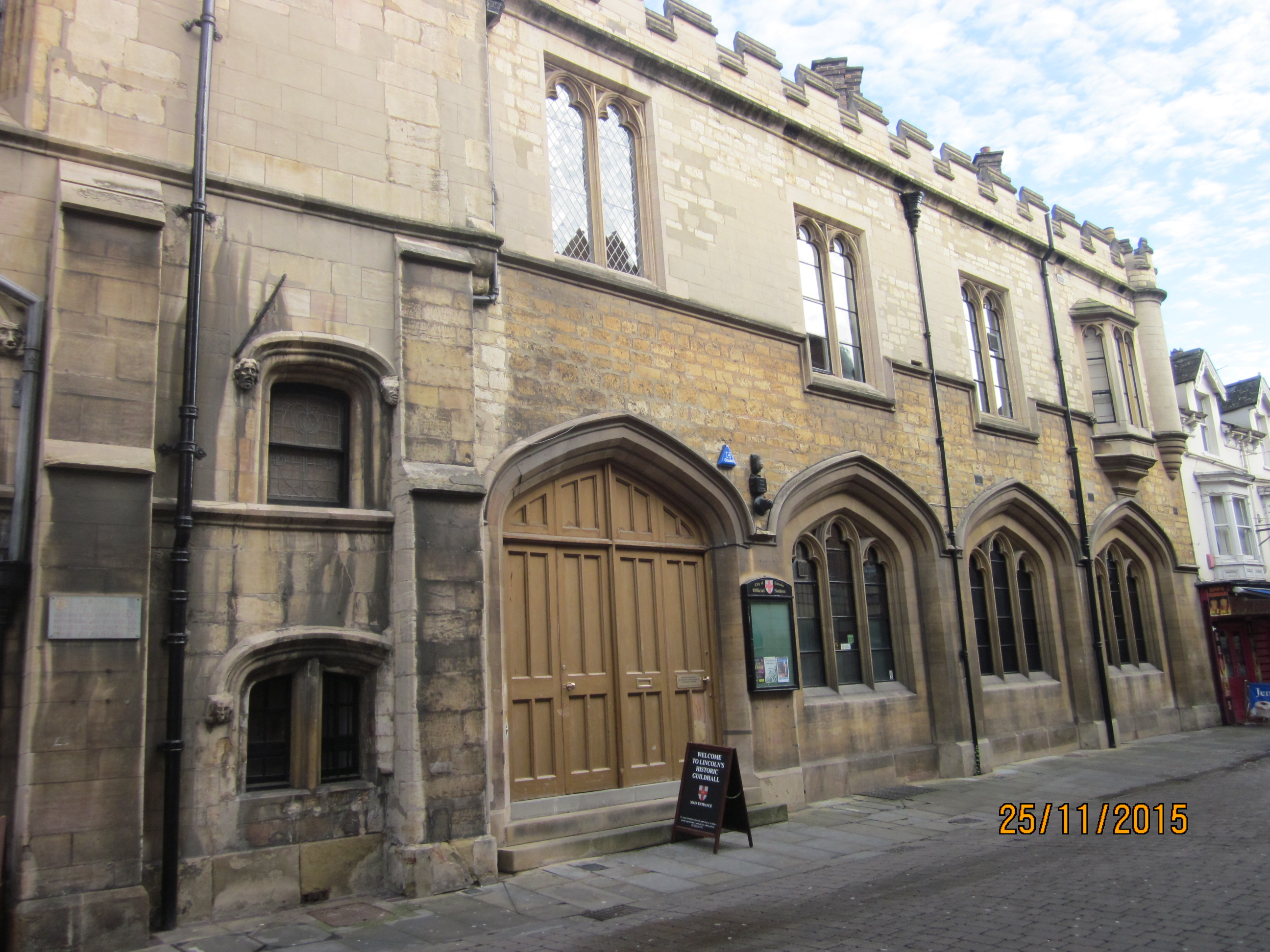
  Stonebow Mayors Parlour, Lincoln
  . Nicholson made extensive alterations to the east end of the Stonebow, when the building that had housed the old City prison was pulled down. The present building to the east of the Stonebow, completed in 1842, now contains the Mayor's Parlour
- The County Prison in Lincoln Castle. In 1847-8 the prison was enlarged following plans by Nicholson and Goddard. A new range was built parallel to the original building of 1787 and linked to it with a corridor. The new range was sparsely detailed but with two massive lateral chimney stacks. At the east end of this range was the prison chapel. As the prison operated the Silent System there were separate cubicles for each prisoner and the cubicles were arranged so that prisoners could see the preacher, but not each other.

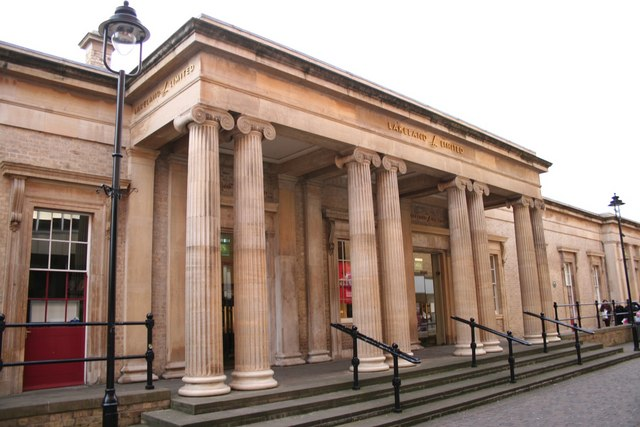
Lincoln St Mark's Station

- Lincoln Stock Library. 227 High Street,(1841)-on the corner of Mint Street. Built as premises for the Library over a grocers shop by Mr Collingham. Italianate frontage. Closed c1907 when the Library was incorporated into the new City Library in Free School Lane. Later the building became part of Mawer and Collingham Department Store.
- St. Mark's Station, High Street, Lincoln. It has been suggested that Nicholson was the architect for St Mark's station in Lincoln High Street of 1846 - the centre with a massive Ionic portico and fluted columns and the side pavilions with Doric pilasters. However, this attribution lacks definite documentation. A surviving drawing of the facade station of the station is signed I.A. Davies. J.A.Davies was an architect employed by the railway engineer Frederick Swanwick and was later in practice in Chesterfield as Davies and Tew. Davies was also responsible for Newark Castle railway station

=== Country houses ===
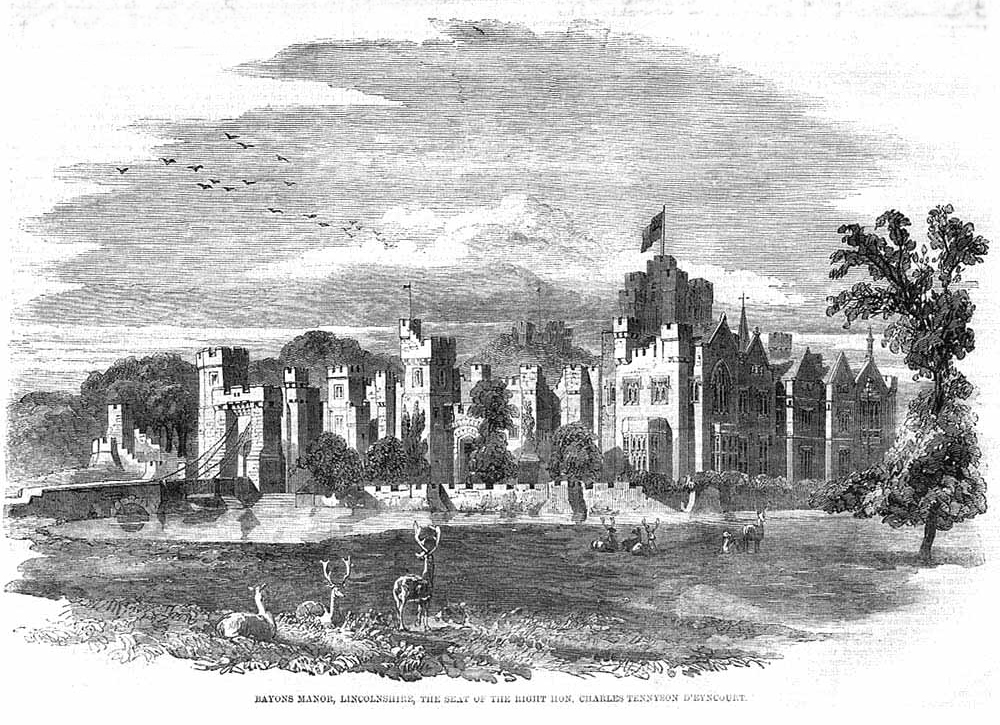
Bayons Manor in 1859

- Worsbough Hall, Barnsley, South Yorkshire. Extended and altered for W. B. Martin in Elizabethan style with a centre and two wings. It was let to a local colliery owner then bought by the National Coal board and used as offices. When they moved out in the early 1960s it was left empty and decaying. It is now being converted modern luxury apartments.
- Bayons Manor, Tealby, Lincolnshire. Built between 1836 and 1842 for Charles Tennyson D'eyncourt, to designs by William Nicholson and with contributions made by Anthony Salvin. It consisted of castellated mansion with a moat, machicolated and embattled towers, curtain-wall and great hall with a hammer-beam roof. It was situated on rising ground to provide a picturesque scene and to give the widest views. The house was occupied by troops during the Second World War, and was sold in 1944. After many years of neglect it was blown up in 1964.
- Brattleby Hall, Lincolnshire. Small country house of c1780, remodelled for Edward Wright in 1838-9 by William Nicholson, with additions of 1875-80. Three storeyed house which is cement or stucco faced. Three bay front with quoins. Central doorway with paired, partially glazed doors flanked by paired ionic pilasters.

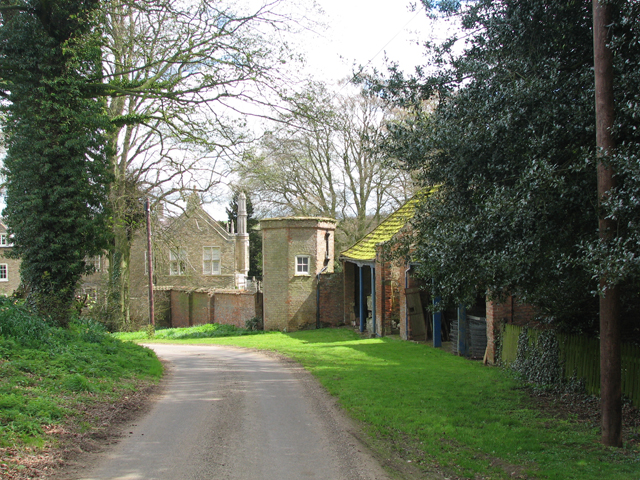
The Approach To Oxcombe House

- South Elkington Hall near Louth. c.1841. A mansion in Italianate style with a tower. Now partiality demolished.
- Oxcombe House. In the style of Nicholson. Built in 1845. Tudoresque, with mullioned and transomed windows. Buttresses crowned by turrets on either side of the porch.
- The Vicarage, Brigg Road, Hibaldstow, Lincolnshire. 1851-52 by Williams Adams Nicholson. Red brick with stucco details, Welsh slate roof. Internal entrance porch with surround of square columns supporting plain entablature and hood; half-glazed door in reveal with margin lights above two panels.

=== Church buildings and restoration ===
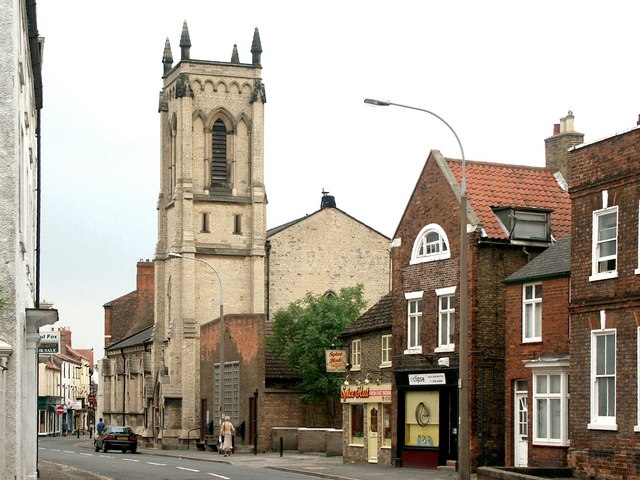
The Church of St John the Evangelist, Brigg 1842

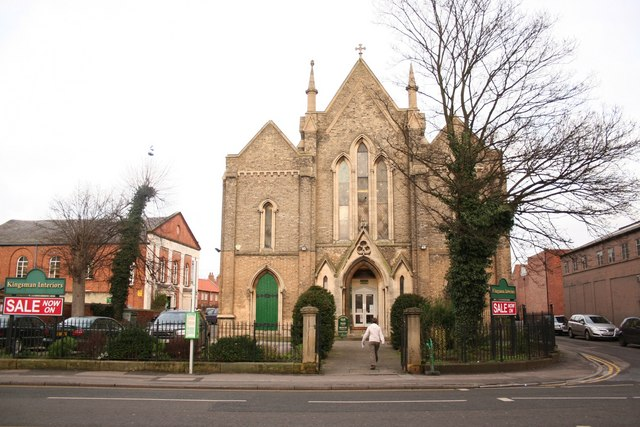
Christchurch - Newark

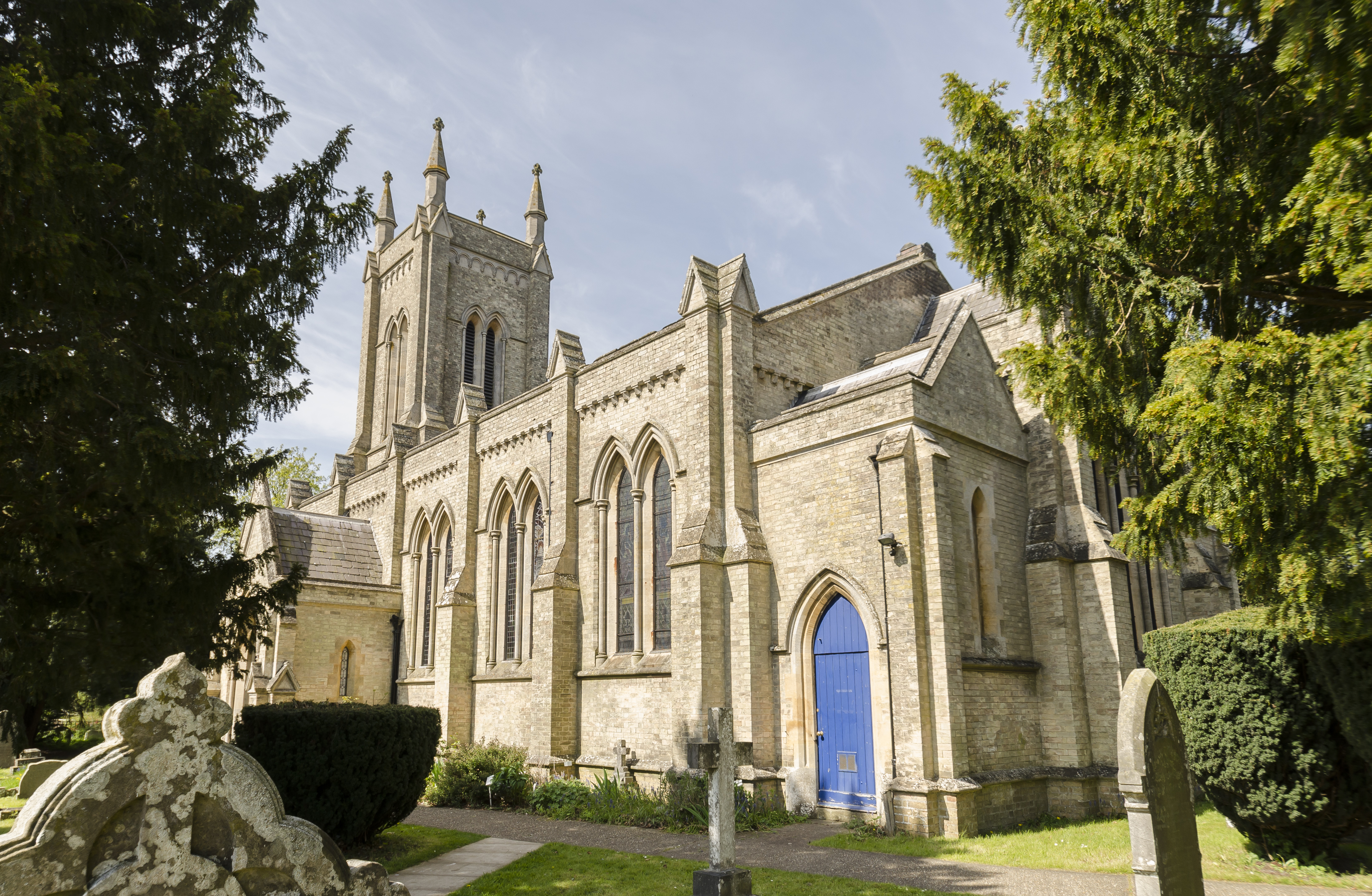
All Saints church, Wragby

- Christ Church, Newark on Trent.(1836) According to Sir Nikolaus Pevsner following Sir Howard Colvin this church was designed by John Davies Paine, a London architect. However the report on the laying of the foundation stone in the Stamford Mercury states that the architect was W.A.Nicholson of Lincoln. The evidence that Paine was the architect is based on a design that he displayed at the Royal Academy, but there is no certainty that this was selected, so on the basis of the newspaper account it seems likely that the architect was Nicholson. The church is of stock or "gault" brick with three gables and three lancet windows in the central gable. Galleries on cast iron columns and a tall lancet arch to the straight ended chancel.
- Wragby, All Saints. 1839. Yellow brick in the style of a Commissioners' church. The detailing on the tower is very similar to that used by Nicholson on Brigg church.
- Scawby 1840-1842. North Lincolnshire. The church of St Hybald is dedicated to a 7th-century Saxon The tower is original, of the 15th century, with 13th-century work at the base, but the remainder of the church was substantially rebuilt in 1840-2 by Nicholson, and in 1870 by James Fowler of Louth.

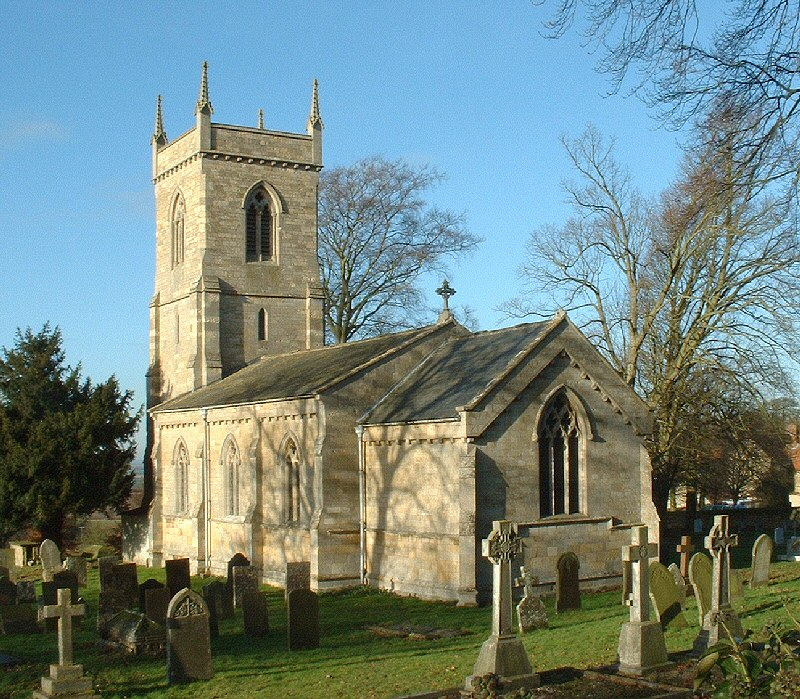
St Andrew's, Boothby Graffoe, 1842

- Boothby Graffoe, St Andrew. Lincolnshire. The Church was rebuilt by W. A. Nicholson in 1842. In an early Decorative revival style, with a W. tower, nave, chancel and S. porch.
- Glandford-Brigg St.John the Evangelist's church. Rebuilt By W.A.Nicholson 1841-3. Neo Early English Style with a SE tower incorporating the porch.. Inside arcades of octagonal piers and double-chamfered arches.
- Kirmond le Mire, Lincolnshire. Built in 1847
- St Peter at Gowts church, Lincoln, The north aisle and porch were built in 1852 to designs by Nicholson.

=== Churches possibly built jointly with George Rivas Willoughby of Louth ===
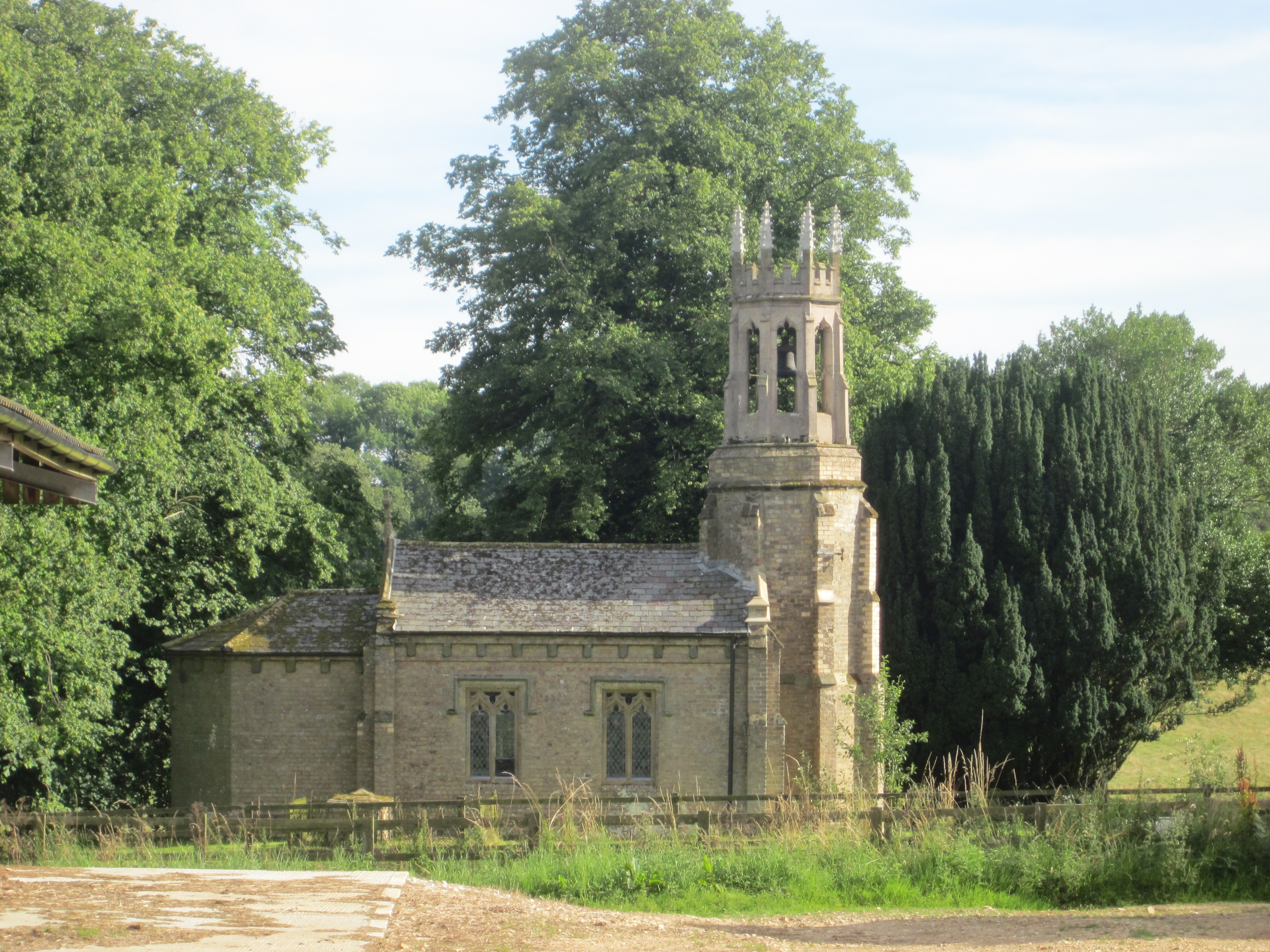
Oxcombe church, 1842

This group of churches, in the vicinity of Louth, present a problem. They have similar design characteristics, and while they appear to be by the same architect they have been attributed to either Nicholson or to the Louth architect G. R. Willoughby. Little is known about Willoughby, although he was still working in 1868 It may be that Willoughby was the supervising architect for these churches and Nicholson had supplied the plans. Leech has argued that the main design input may have come from Willoughby, as they are distinct from the other churches built by Nicholson Nicholson worked extensively for the Chaplin family of Blankney, so it might well be expected that he was the architect selected when the Rev Henry Chaplin paid for the new churches at Haugham and Raithby. Antram has described these churches as being pre-archaeological and gimmicky, yet many of the features described, such as the crockets, appear to be closely copied from the limestone churches in the Grantham area. The flying buttresses used to supported the crocheted spires, as at Haugham, are similar to those on Louth church. This group of churches have been built of brick, but cement or stucco rendered, to give the impression of ashlar masonry. Documentary research may resolve the problem as to who was the architect of these churches:

- Raithby by Louth Rebuilt in 1836-7 in the florid Gothic style, mainly at the expense of the patron (Charles Chaplin) and the Rector .
- Haugham, nr. Louth, Lincolnshire. !840-1. Brick, spire supported by flying buttresses. By G R Willoughby, but presumably in association with Nicholson. The church was cement rendered to give the impression that it was built of stone.
- Oxcombe, All Saints Church. Built in 1842 and attributed to the architect William Adams Nicholson. A small church, built in brick with an octagonal west tower, which also forms the porch to the church It has a two-bay nave with a chancel with a three-sided apse. The bell stage of the tower is an open stone lantern with cast-iron pinnacles. The church was declared redundant in 1980 and is in the care of the Lincolnshire Old Churches Trust.
- Biscathorpe

== Gallery: Churches by W. A. Nicholson ==
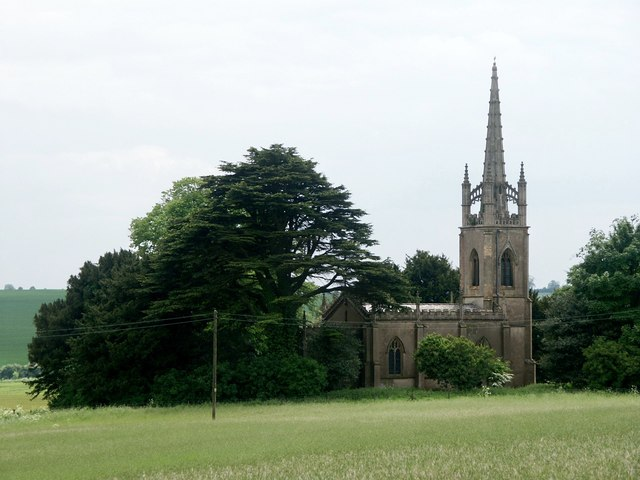
All Saints', Haugham

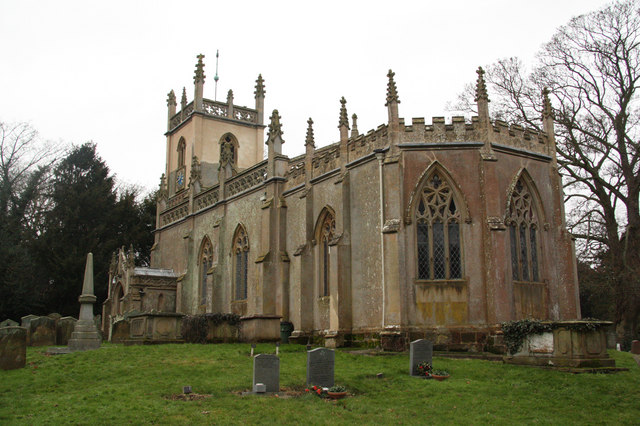
St Peter's church. Raithby by Louth

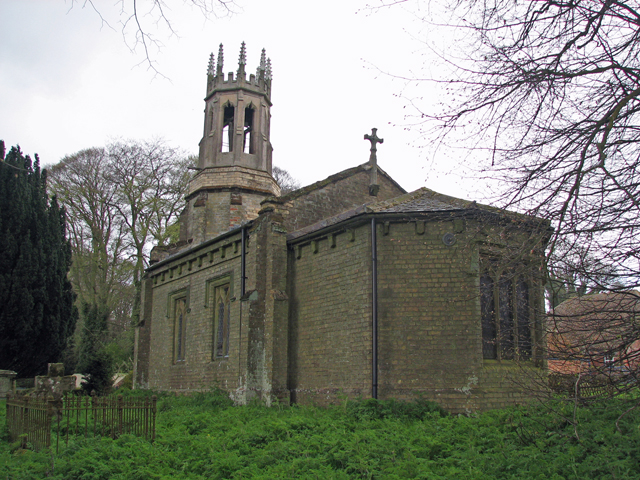
All Saints' Church, Oxcombe

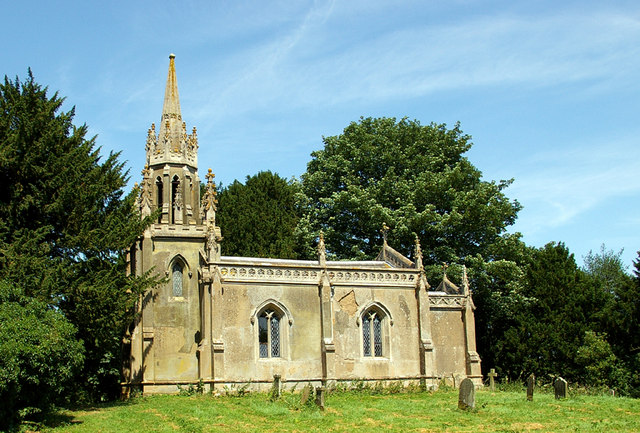
Biscathorpe Church by Nicholson and Willoughby of Louth

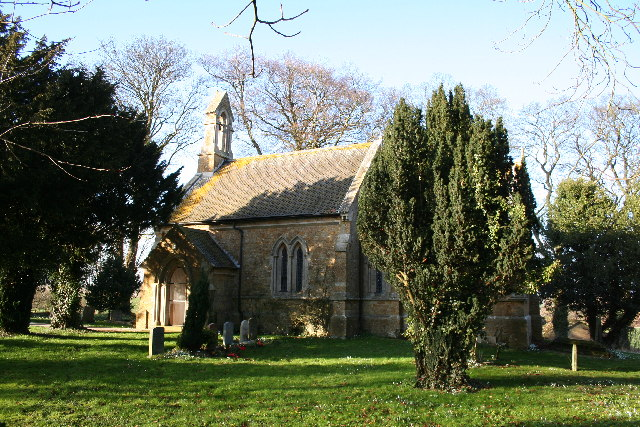
St Martin's church, Kirmond-le-Mire, Lincolnshire, to the design by Nicholson.

=== Chapels ===
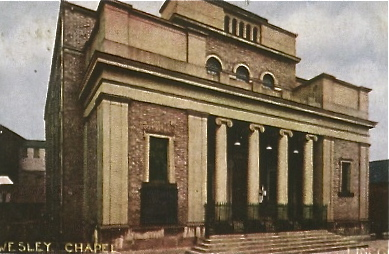
Big Wesley Chapel, Clasketgate, Lincoln 1837

- The Big Wesley at the junction of Clasketgate and Danesgate in Lincoln. Wesleyan Chapel of 1837, built for 1400 persons. Demolished in 1963. Built in Neo-classical style. Pevsner remarks A pastiche of Smirke's "Cubist" style, that is, an essay in intersecting cubes. Front with Ionic portico in antis. Built in brick and stuccoed.

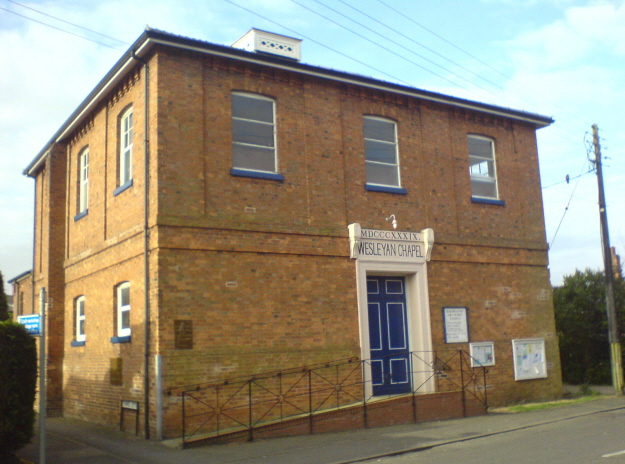
Bassingham Wesleyan Methodist Church1839

- Wesleyan Chapel, Bassingham, Lincolnshire (1839). Nicholson advertised for tenders for the construction of a chapel in July 1839. The chapel was rebuilt at the cost of £1000 on the site of an earlier chapel of 1802. A Wesleyan School and a teacher's house were added in 1855. The chapel is still in use. The chapel is a large square box-shaped building with two tiers of windows on the sides. The front elevation has a central door and above the door, flanked by brackets, an inscription 'Wesleyan Chapel MDCCCXXX'. The upper storey of the front elevation has three bays of segmental-headed windows separated by pilasters.

=== Schools ===
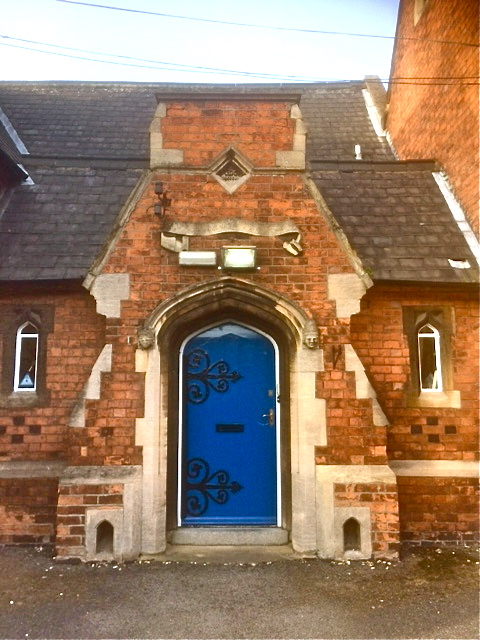
Eastgate School Lincoln 1851

- Louth British School. 1840.
- St Peter in Eastgate Primary School, Eastgate, Lincoln. 1851. Pevsner described this as a Tudoresque villagey school. A further school was built on this site by William Watkins, in 1881 which was combined with the earlier school.

=== Post Office ===
- 311-2 High Street, Lincoln. Site of the Old Crown Inn, which was demolished in 1843. Rebuilt as a Post Office for John W Drury, bookseller and printer, architects Nicholson and Goddard, opening in November 1844. The building was later Page Woodcock's pharmacy and Pennells, the nurseyman. This building was then demolished in 1972 to make way for the Boots pharmacy.

=== Estate housing ===
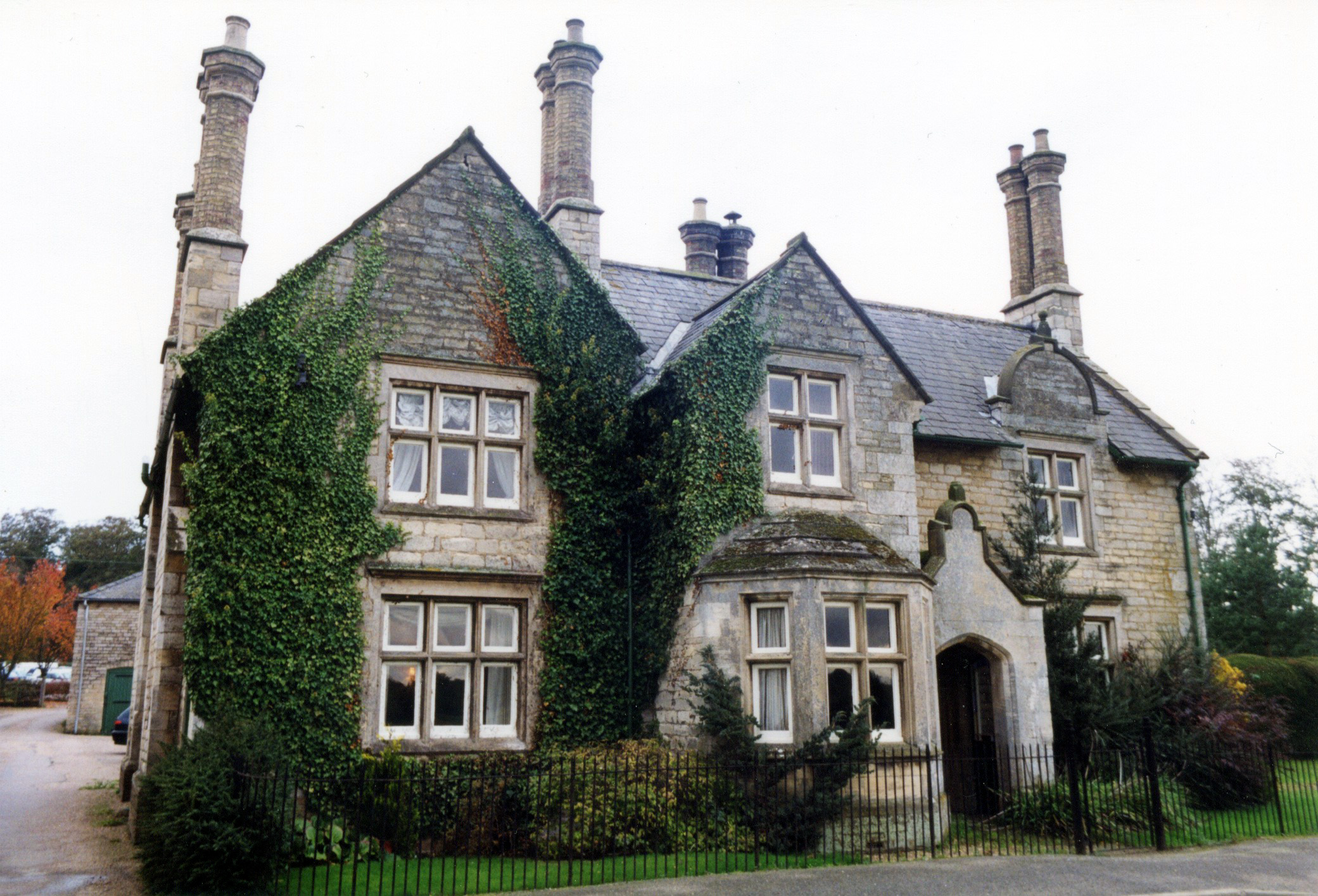
Home Farmhouse Main Street Blankney

- The village of Blankney, near Lincoln, was almost rebuilt for Charles Chaplin. The village was laid out by Nicholson in the 1830s and 1840s and later housing may have been added by William Watkins (architect) in 1876. Nicholson's work can be recognised by the shaped gables and the tall chimney stacks. The village school is described as being a neat building in Elizabethan style.
- Leadenham Nicholson put up farm buildings on the estates of General Reeve of Leadenham House.
- Stamford. Nicholson undertook work for Sir John Wyldbore Smith, bart. of Blandford in Dorset who held land in Stamford.
- Work on the estates of C. Turnor, of Stoke Rocheford which included church and farmhouse additions and alterations at Great Ponton, Panton, Lissington, Langworth, East Torrington, East Barkwith, Wragby, Binbrook and Kirmond le Mire.
- Grange Farm, Little Ponton-built for Christopher Turnor.

=== Gallery of estate villages and buildings by Nicholson ===
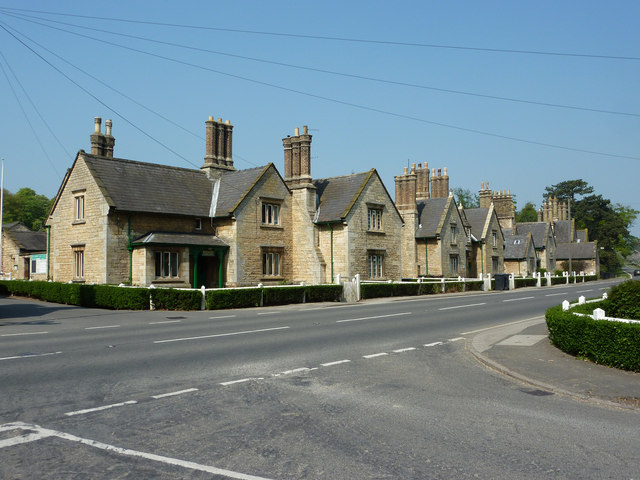
Blankney cottages

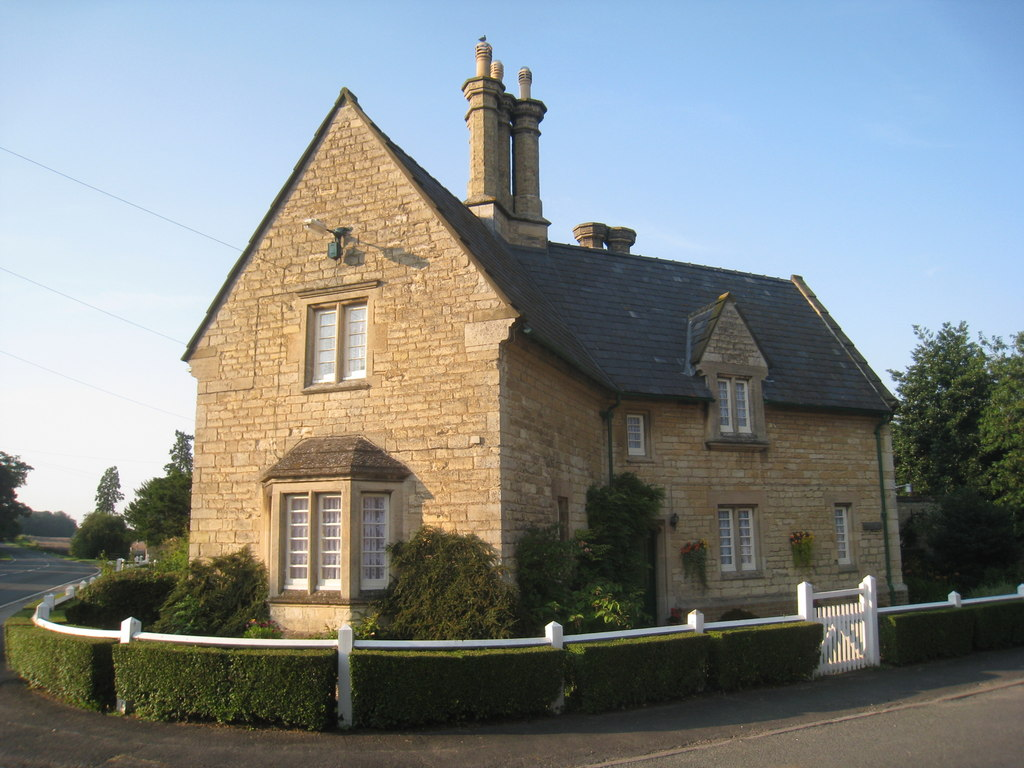
Cottage on the corner of Sleaford Road, Blankney

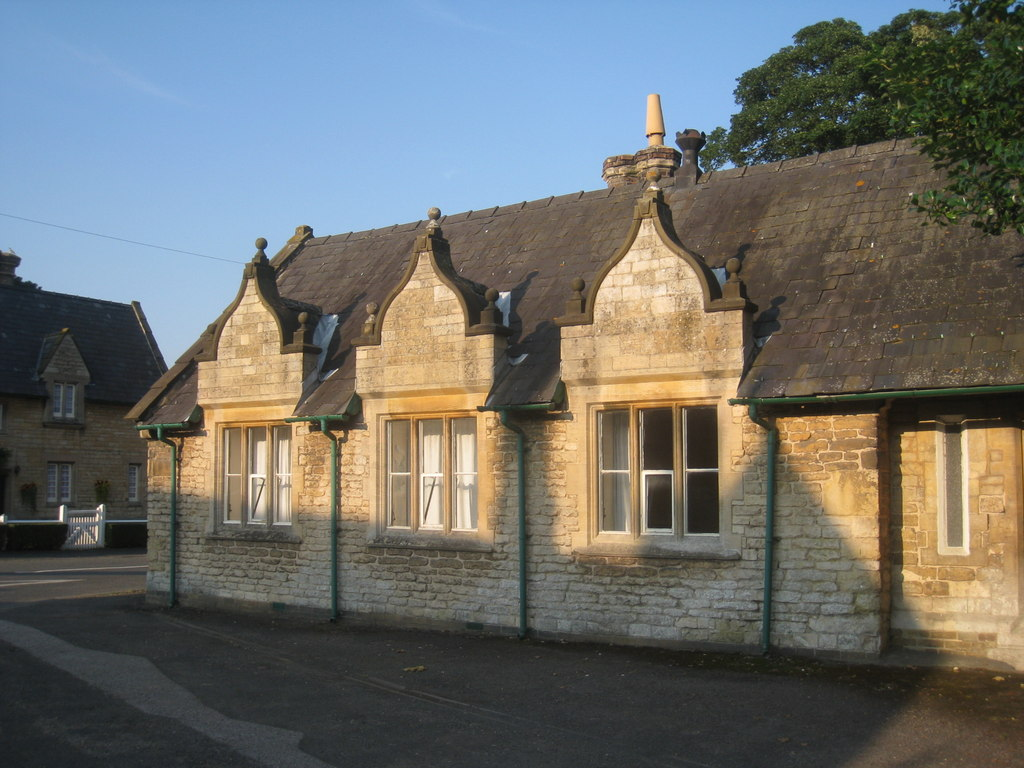
The former school, Blankney

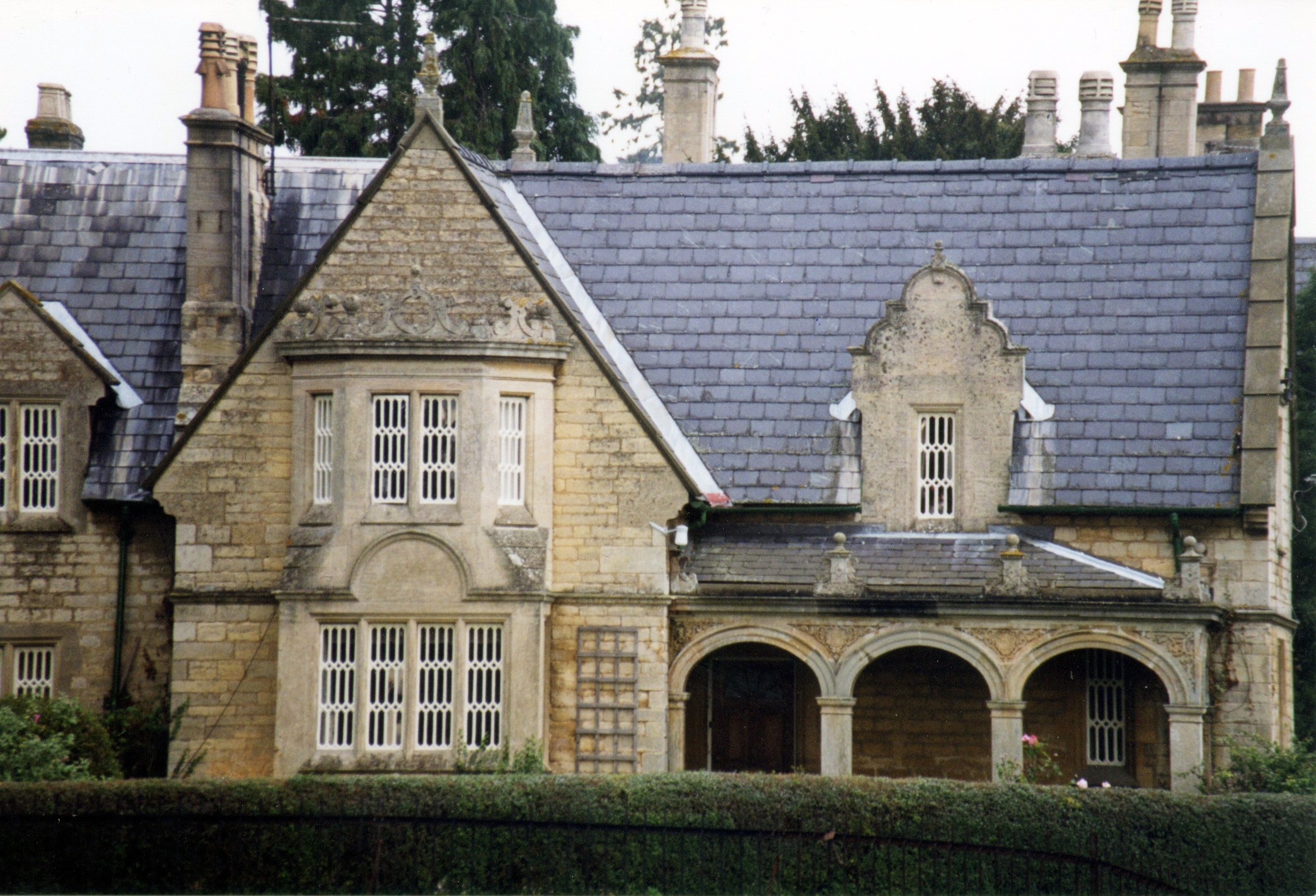
The Lodge, B1188 Main Street, Blankney

== Literature ==
- Antram N (revised), Pevsner N & Harris J, (1989), The Buildings of England: Lincolnshire, Yale University Press.
- Antonia Brodie (ed), Directory of British Architects, 1834–1914: 2 Vols, British Architectural Library, Royal Institute of British Architects, 2001, Vol 2, pp. 264 and 565.
- Colvin H. A (1995), Biographical Dictionary of British Architects 1600-1840. Yale University Press, 3rd edition London, p. 1140.
- Morrison K. (1999), The Workhouse: A Study of Poor-Law Buildings in England, English Heritage/RCHME, ISBN 9781873592366
- Obituary in the Builder, Vol.11, 23rd Apr 1853, p. 262.
- Obituary in the Civil Engineer & Architect's Journal [London], Vol. 16, May 1853, p. 197.
