= Farforth =

Hamlet in the East Lindsey district of Lincolnshire, England

Coordinates: 53.291495°N 0.019665°W

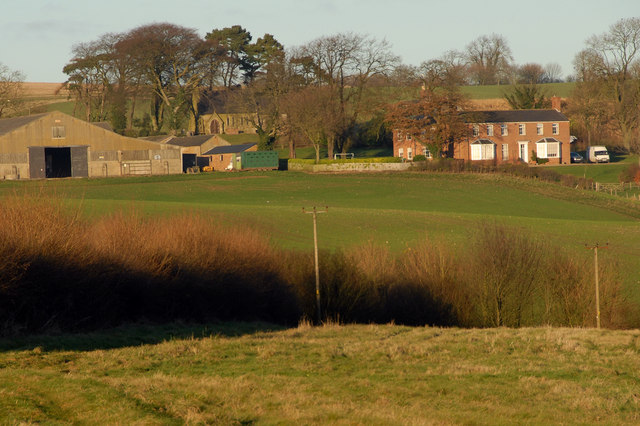
- Farforth in winter

- Location within Lincolnshire
- OS grid reference: TF320789
  - London: 125 mi (201 km) S
- Civil parish: Maidenwell
- District: East Lindsey
- Shire county: Lincolnshire
- Region: East Midlands
- Country: England
- Sovereign state: United Kingdom
- Post town: Louth
- Postcode district: LN11
- Police: Lincolnshire
- Fire: Lincolnshire
- Ambulance: East Midlands
- UK Parliament: Louth and Horncastle

Farforth or Farforth-cum-Maidenwell is a hamlet in the East Lindsey district of Lincolnshire, England. It is in the civil parish of Maidenwell, and approximately 6 miles (10 km) south of the town of Louth.

The parish church is dedicated to Saint Peter and is a Grade II listed building, rebuilt in 1861 using material from a previous medieval church. The font dates from the 15th century. The 1861 rebuilding in Early English style was financed by the family of William and Francis Osiear and the Corporation of Basingstoke. William and Francis Osiear are commemorated through an engraved brass plate in the chancel.
