= Ruckland =

Village in Lincolnshire, England

Coordinates: 53.282895°N 0.001522°W

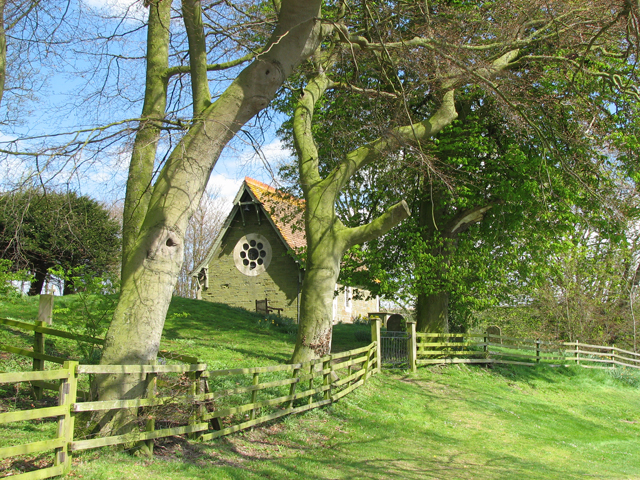
- St Olave's Church, Ruckland

- Location within Lincolnshire
- OS grid reference: TF333780
  - London: 125 mi (201 km) S
- Civil parish: Maidenwell
- District: East Lindsey
- Shire county: Lincolnshire
- Region: East Midlands
- Country: England
- Sovereign state: United Kingdom
- Post town: Louth
- Postcode district: LN11
- Police: Lincolnshire
- Fire: Lincolnshire
- Ambulance: East Midlands
- UK Parliament: Louth and Horncastle

Ruckland is a village in the civil parish of Maidenwell, and about 6 miles (10 km) south from the town of Louth, in the East Lindsey district, in the county of Lincolnshire, England. It lies in the Lincolnshire Wolds, a designated Area of Outstanding Natural Beauty. In 1931 the parish had a population of 21. On 1 April 1936 the parish was abolished to form Maidenwell.

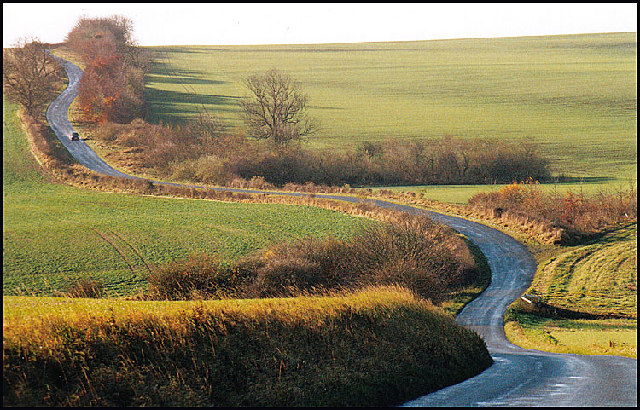
Wolds road to Rucklands from Haugham

In the 1086 Domesday Book Ruckland is written as "Rochland", with nine households, the Lord of the manor being Briscard.

Ruckland's church, dedicated to Saint Olave (sometimes Olaf), seats forty people. It was built in 1885 of green sandstone by William Scorer, and is a Grade II listed building. The churchyard contains the war graves of a Royal Navy sailor and an Army Veterinary Corps soldier of the Second World War.

George Hall (1863–1918) was rector of Ruckland and a member of the Gypsy Lore Society. In 1915 he published his book, The Gypsy's Parson - His Experiences and Adventures.
