= Maidenwell, Lincolnshire =

Village and civil parish in Lincolnshire, England

Coordinates: 53.295486°N 0.018470°W

Maidenwell
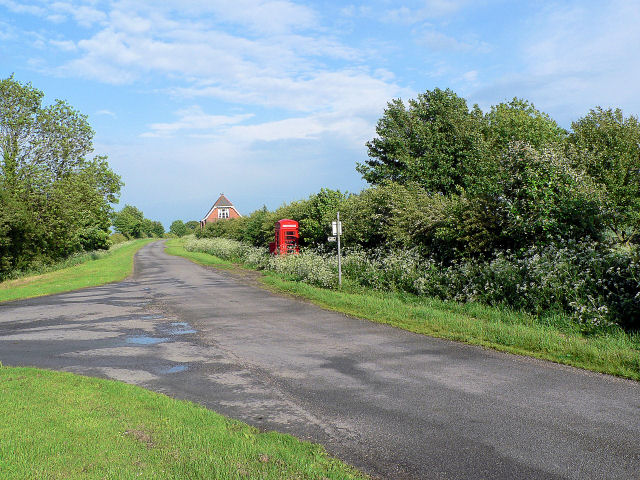
- Maidenwell village

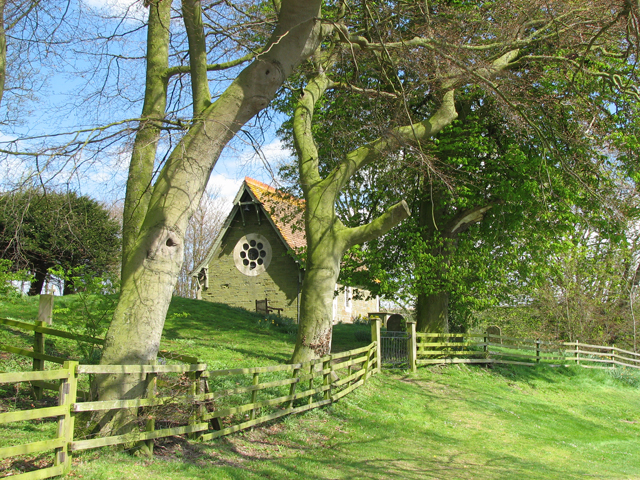
- St Olave's Church in Ruckland

- Location within Lincolnshire
- OS grid reference: TF321794
  - London: 125 mi (201 km) S
- District: East Lindsey
- Shire county: Lincolnshire
- Region: East Midlands
- Country: England
- Sovereign state: United Kingdom
- Post town: Louth
- Postcode district: LN11
- Police: Lincolnshire
- Fire: Lincolnshire
- Ambulance: East Midlands
- UK Parliament: Louth and Horncastle

Maidenwell is a village and civil parish in the East Lindsey district of Lincolnshire, England. The village is 6 miles (10 km) south from Louth. Maidenwell population is included in the civil parish of Burwell. The parish includes the village of Ruckland and the hamlets of Oxcombe, Farforth, and Worlaby.

== History ==
A Prehistoric or Roman trackway and settlement has been identified through the village. and several Neolithic burials, including a typical early long barrow.

The village of Maidenwell, separately assessed in documents of 1334, was united with Farforth parish in 1450 or possibly 1592. Maidenwell was probably depopulated about 1400–28. Significant earthworks of the former medieval settlement were still traceable in the 20th century.

Worlaby at the southeast of the parish, today a farm and farmland, in 1872 was described in White's Directory as former extra-parochial, and a parish of 490 acres (2.0 km^{2}) with a population of 57, whose owner lived at Worlaby House. The estate had been purchased from the late Earl of Yarborough. A Church Mission Room—lacking parish status but supported by an external parish—was built at Worlaby in 1870, whose services were taken by the rector of Louth or his curate.

== Community ==
The village falls within the ecclesiastical parish of Ruckland with Farforth in The South Ormsby Group of the Deanery of Bolingbroke. The 2013 incumbent is the Revd Cheryl Hilliam. The parish church is the tiny Church of St Olave at Ruckland. Further churches in the parish are All Saints' at Oxcombe and St Andrew's at Farforth.
