= John Thomas Becher =

English clergyman and social reformer (1770–1848)

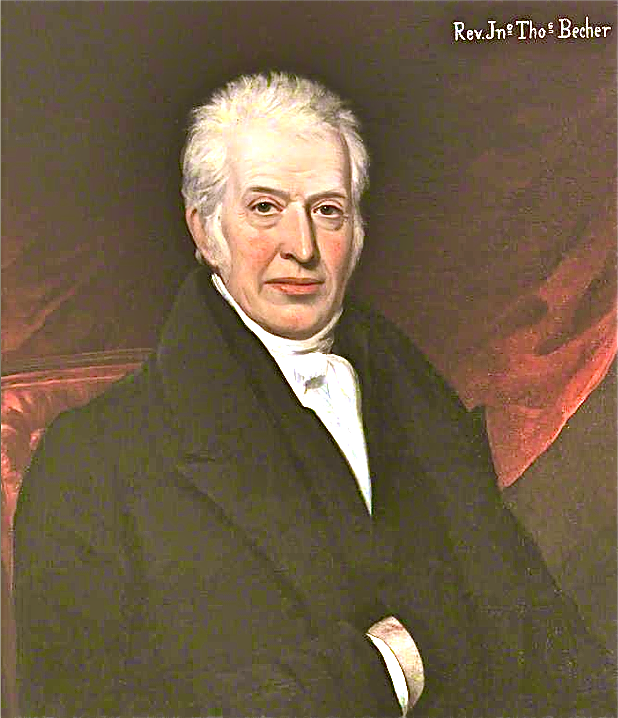
- Rev. John Thomas Becher of Southwell
- Born: 1770
- Died: 1848 (aged 77–78)

The Rev. John Thomas Becher (1770 – 1848) was an English clergyman, social reformer and Vicar-General of Southwell Minster from 1818 to 1840.

== Career ==
=== Early life and education ===
John Thomas Becher was the eldest son of Michael Becher and his wife Catherine(née French) of Cork, Ireland. Branches of the Becher family established themselves at Bristol and at Southwell. The 'Bristol' Bechers were heavily involved in shipping which included slave trading activities. The 'Southwell' Bechers were important as local land agents, squires and parsons for generations. John Thomas Becher was sent to Westminster School at the age of 14 in 1783, becoming a King's Scholar in 1784. In April 1788 was admitted to Lincoln's Inn, but shortly afterwards moved to Christ Church, Oxford where he took his B.A. in 1792 and proceeded to M.A. in 1795. He appears to have moved to Southwell by 1792, and after ordination in the Church of England he became Perpetual curate of Thurgarton and Hoveringham, Nottinghamshire in 1799. In 1801 he became vicar of Rampton, Nottinghamshire and in 1802 of Midsomer Norton in Somerset.

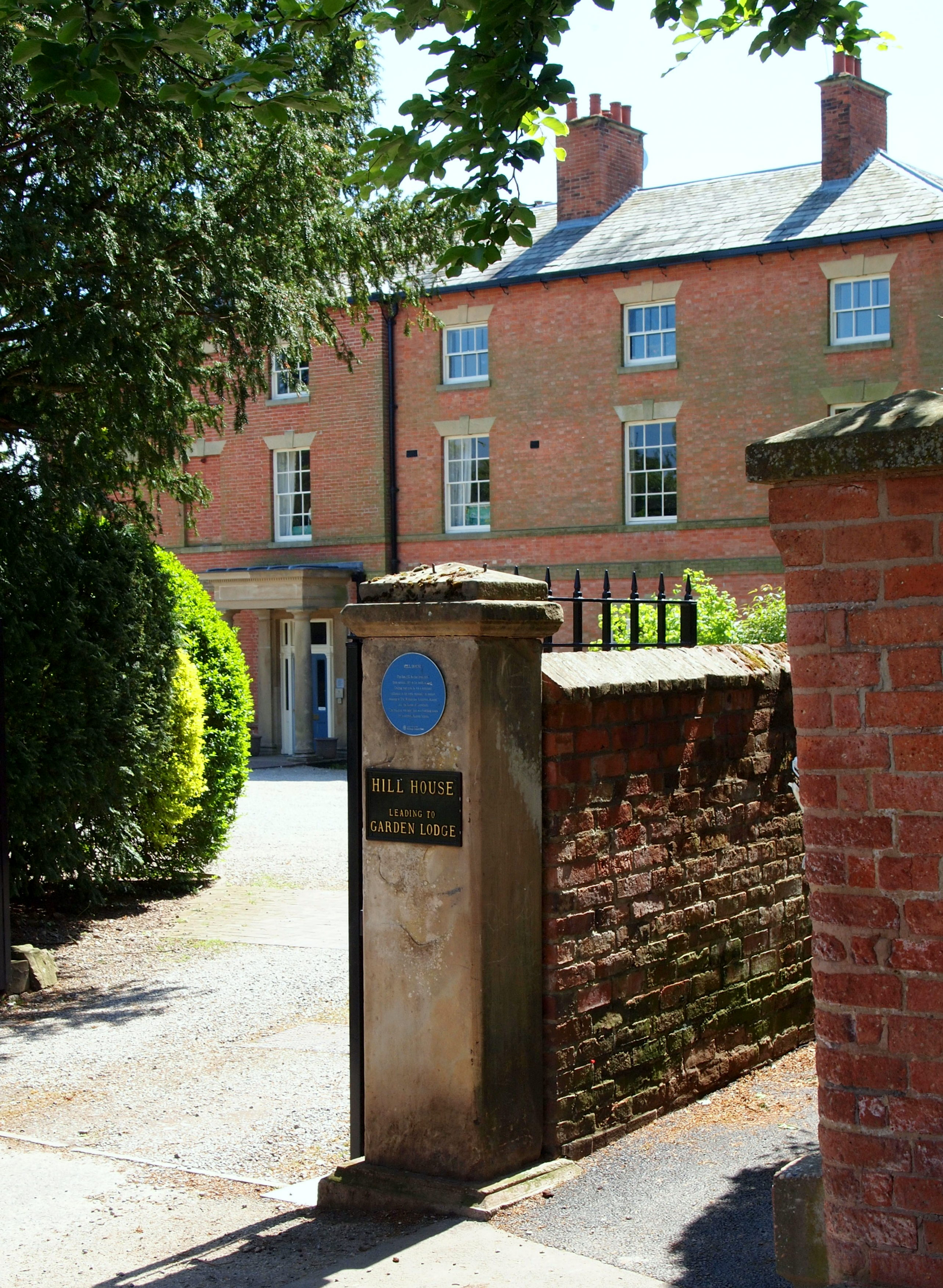
Hill House, built for Becher

In January 1802 Becher married Mary, daughter of the Rev. William Becher, a relative, who was a Prebendary of Southwell Minster. Becher had Hill House in Easthorpe, Southwell, built for them to live in.

=== Friendship with Lord Byron ===
He became a friend of Byron when the poet was staying at Southwell during his Cambridge vacations; and at his advice Byron suppressed his first privately printed volume. Extracts of poems written to Becher by Lord Byron are given below

Poems by Lord Byron to the Rev. J.T. Becher
Dear Becher, you tell me to mix with mankind;
I cannot deny such a precept is wise;
But retirement accords with the tone of my mind:
I will not descend to a world I despise.

But Becher! you're a 'reverend pastor',
Now take it in consideration,
Whether for penance I should fast, or
Pray for my 'sins' in expiation.

Candour compels me, BECHER! to commend
The verse, which blends the censor with the friend;
Your strong yet just reproof extorts applause
From me, the heedless and imprudent cause;
For this wild error, which pervades my strain,
I sue for pardon,–must I sue in vain?

— Poems by Byron

1808

== Justice of the Peace and Poor Law Reformer ==
He took a warm interest in everything connected with the social condition of the people, and, whether he was its founder or not, zealously promoted the establishment of a friendly society at Southwell. In 1824 he published The Constitution of Friendly Societies upon Legal and Scientific Principles exemplified by the Rules and Tables of Calculations adopted ... for the Government of the Friendly Institute at Southwell (3rd edition, 1826); followed in 1825 by Tables showing the single and monthly contributions to be paid, the allowances to be granted, and the method of calculating, at every period of life, the value of assurances effected by members of Friendly Societies, together with a system of Bookkeeping recommended for the use of such institutions. In 1826 appeared his Observations upon the Report from the Select Committee of the House of Commons on the Laws respecting Friendly Societies, exemplifying and vindicating the principles of Life Assurance adopted in calculating the Southwell Tables, together with the heads of a Bill for improving the constitution and management of such institutions. The vindication was of Becher's contention that sick allowances could be calculated on a scientific basis, and that the Northampton tables of mortality afforded the best data for life assurance and cognate calculations, both of which positions had been contested before the committee by Mr. Finlaison, the actuary of the national debt. In 1828 Becher published The Anti-Pauper System, exemplifying the positive and practical good realised by the relievers and the relieved under the frugal, beneficent, and careful administration of the poor laws prevailing at Southwell and in the neighbouring district.... The erection of a workhouse at Southwell, the substitution of indoor for outdoor relief, and the making the former as repulsive as possible to able-bodied paupers, had caused considerable reduction in the rates at Southwell, and the system in operation there had been copied with similar results in various parishes throughout the country. The select committee of the House of Commons on agriculture in its report pointed attention to the value of Becher's system, which was also favourably mentioned by the Quarterly Review. In 1834, during the official investigation which resulted in the new poor law, Becher issued a second edition of this work, with a new introduction. In 1837, he apparently converted, on at least one point, Finlaison, his former antagonist, and there appeared Rules of the Northampton Equitable Friendly Institution, and tables calculated from actual returns of sickness, old age, and death, by the Rev. J. T. Becher, M.A., and J. Finlaison, Esquire, Actuary of the National Debt.

=== Promotion in the Church of England ===
In 1818 he became a prebendary of Southwell, and was vicar-general of the collegiate church, the dean and chapter of which presented him in 1830 to the rectory of Barnborough, Yorkshire. Becher died at Hill House, Southwell, on 3 January 1848, aged 78. (Note: Becher's writings) (Note: Welch's List of the Queen's Scholars of St. Peter's College, Westminster (new edition, 1852)) (Note: Gentlemen's Magazine for April 1848.)

== Literature ==
- Morrison K. (1999), The Workhouse: A Study of Poor-Law Buildings in England, English Heritage/RCHME, ISBN 9781873592366
- Smith R. (2015) Nottinghamshire House of Correction, Southwell (1611-1880): A Model Institution: Essential History and Architectural Notes, Southwell and District Local History Society. ISBN 978-0-9932442-2-3
