= Haugham =

Village and civil parish in the East Lindsey district of Lincolnshire, England

Coordinates: 53.313703°N 0.007111°E

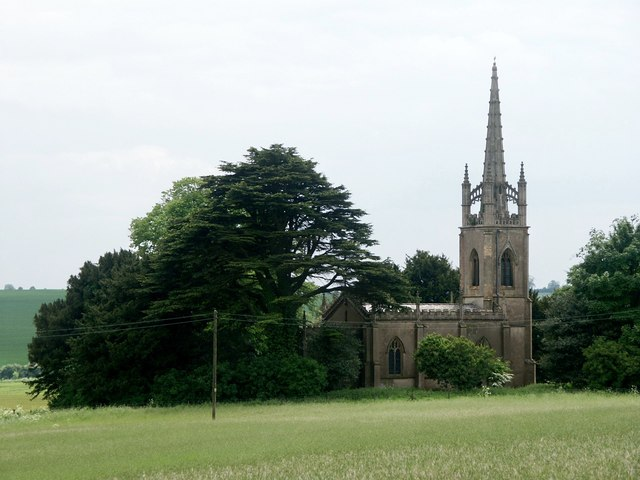
- All Saints' Church, Haugham

- Location within Lincolnshire
- OS grid reference: TF338815
  - London: 125 mi (201 km) S
- District: East Lindsey
- Shire county: Lincolnshire
- Region: East Midlands
- Country: England
- Sovereign state: United Kingdom
- Post town: Louth
- Postcode district: LN11
- Police: Lincolnshire
- Fire: Lincolnshire
- Ambulance: East Midlands
- UK Parliament: Louth and Horncastle

Haugham is a village and civil parish in the East Lindsey district of Lincolnshire, England. It is situated 3 miles (5 km) south from Louth. The prime meridian passes directly through Haugham.

== History ==
According to A Dictionary of British Place Names, Haugham derives from "high or chief homestead", from the Old English 'heah' and 'ham'.

The place-name is first attested in the Domesday Book of 1086. The priory of Haugham was built upon land granted by Hugh, Earl of Chester, towards the end of the eleventh century, to the Benedictine abbot and convent of St. Severus in the diocese of Coutances. Priors were appointed by the bishops of Lincoln until 1329, this ending owing to wars with France. Subsequently, in 1398, the priory and its possessions were transferred to the Carthusian priory of St Anne at Coventry.

In 1885, Kelly's Directory noted that the lord of the manor and sole landowner of Haugham was Henry Chaplin MP, PC. Haugham consisted of 1,907 acres (7.7 km^{2}), of which 450 were woodland, with agricultural production as chiefly wheat, barley and oats.

== Governance ==
The Parish Council is the level of local government in East Lindsey nearest to the people of Haugham. The old parishes were formed at a time when there was little difference between the Church and the State. In the late 1800s, Church and State separated but the same area is now represented as a local authority by the Haugham Parish Council and the Church of England by the Parochial Church Council.

== See also ==
- All Saints' Church, Haugham
