= Corringham Wapentake =

Ancient subdivision of Lincolnshire, England

The wapentake of Corringham stretched for 13 miles along the east bank of the River Trent, varying in width between 5 and 8 miles, and bounded by Manley wapentake, the Isle of Axholme, parts of Nottinghamshire, and Well and Aslacoe wapentakes.

The wapentake straddles a gentle rise in the land, from the marshes or cars along the banks of the river, undulating up to the western ridge of the Lincolnshire Wolds, also known as Cliff Range. Whites notes that in medieval times there were extensive rabbit warrens in the area.

The entire wapentake was wholly in the Deanery of Corringham, the Archdeanconry of Stow, and the Parts of Lindsey, and includes the port town of Gainsborough, and the country market town of Kirton in Lindsey.

The parishes in this wapentake were:

- Blyton-cum-Wharton
- Greenhill and Redhill extra parochial
- Corringham
- Gainsborough
  - Morton by Gainsborough
  - East Stockwith
  - Walkerith
- Grayingham
- Heapham
- Kirton in Lindsey
- Laughton by Blyton
- Wildsworth hamlet
- Lea
- Northorpe
- Paddocks extra parochial
- Pilham with Gilby
- Scotter
- Scotton
- East Ferry
- Scunthorpe extra parochial
- Springthorpe
