= Jenny Hurn =

Riverine feature in Lincolnshire

Coordinates: 53.4785°N 0.7727°W

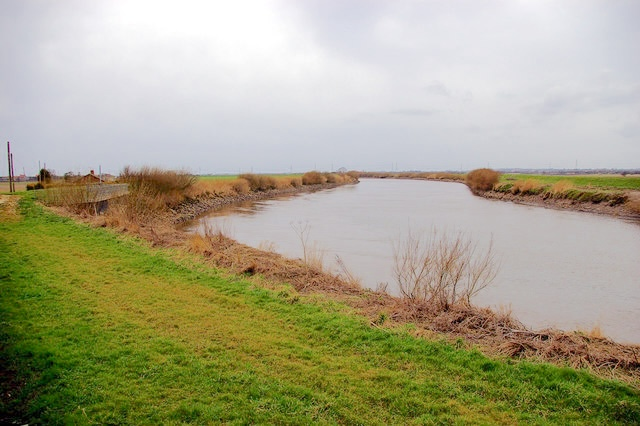
The Trent at Jenny Hurn

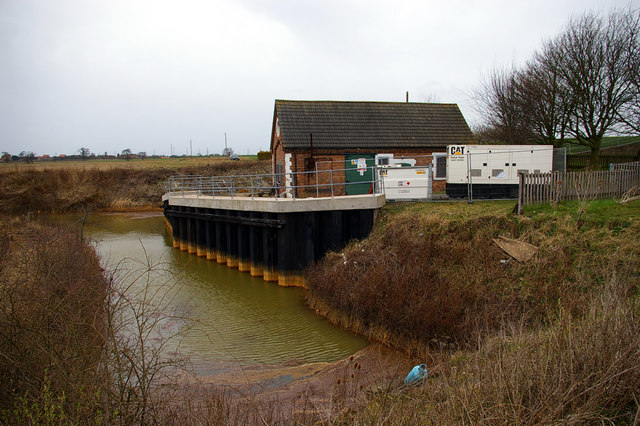
The pumping station

Jenny Hurn, the Half-Part footpath (on the west side) and pumping station (on the east) shown on a late 19th/early 20th-century Ordnance Survey map

The Jenny Hurn is a bend on the River Trent in Lincolnshire, England. It is a tight bend on the navigable stretch of the river and historically has been a dangerous spot; orders were made to prevent boats from waiting there. It is now the site of a pumping station to drain nearby farmland and an air quality monitoring site. In folklore, the site was the haunt of a boggart known as Jenny who crossed the river in a pie dish to feed on crops in nearby farmland.

== Description ==
The Jenny Hurn lies downstream of Wildsworth and upstream of Owston Ferry and East Ferry. It is towards the lower, tidal reaches of the river and approximately 4 metres (13 ft) above sea level. Three tributaries join the Trent in this stretch and they combine to cause powerful and complex currents. Historically it was a dangerous spot for an inexperienced boat pilot due to the tightness of the bend in the river. An 1887 Order in Council by Queen Victoria prohibited vessels from lingering at Jenny Hurn for more than 48 hours unless waiting to load or unload.

The bend gives its name to the Jenny Hurn estate, of 1,750 acres (710 ha), lying east of the river and part of the holdings of the Meynell-Ingram family. The estate is drained by the bankside Jenny Hurn pumping station, operated by the Scunthorpe and Gainsborough Water Management Board. When a drainage ditch was excavated east of the river in 1883 a row of buried late Roman or Anglo-Saxon urns, containing cremated remains were found. A tree on the east bank at Jenny Hurn is said to have been damaged when a Royal Air Force bomber piloted by a Polish airman crashed during the Second World War and never regrew.

The bankside flood defences in the area were raised in 1943. An air pollution monitoring station is located at the site.

== In folklore ==
Folklorist Guy Ragland Phillips in 1976 proposed that the "Jenny" part of the name might derive from an Iberian or pre-Celtic goddess and that the "Hurn" portion might be associated with the mythological Herne the Hunter. History writer Tom Fort in 2008 stated that the name derived from a local myth, that of Jinny/Jenny on Boggard, a form of boggart.

The tale of Jenny had been recorded by mid 20th-century folklorist Ethel Rudkin. She noted that the creature was said to be a pygmy who crossed the river in a craft similar to a pie dish propelled by oars the size of teaspoons in order to feed from crops in nearby fields. This version of the creature was said to have a human body but the face of a seal. In alternative versions of the tale, the creature emerges directly from the water and has large eyes, long hair and walrus-like tusks. The descriptions of the creature bear some resemblance to those of the Yallery Brown, another creature of Lincolnshire folklore, associated with the river.

Boatmen in the area reported mysterious bumps against their ships when waiting overnight at Jenny Hurn for the tide to turn; they attributed these bumps to the boggart. The legend of the boggart made boatmen wary of anchoring on the Jenny Hurn. Rudkin records that a footpath, known as the Half-Part, cut away from the riverside path at Jenny Hurn. It was often used by locals, particularly after dusk, in preference to the riverside path despite being very narrow and muddy because of superstitions around the boggart.
