= Scotter (disambiguation) =

Scotter is a village and civil parish in Lincolnshire, England.

Scotter can also refer to:

== People with the surname ==
- Emma Scotter, New Zealand academic neuropharmacologist
- Sheila Scotter (1920–2012), Australian businesswoman
- William Scotter (1922–1981), British army general
- Scotter baronets, a baronetcy in the United Kingdom

== See also ==
- Scotterthorpe, a hamlet in Scotter parish, Lincolnshire
