= River Eau =

River in Lincolnshire, England

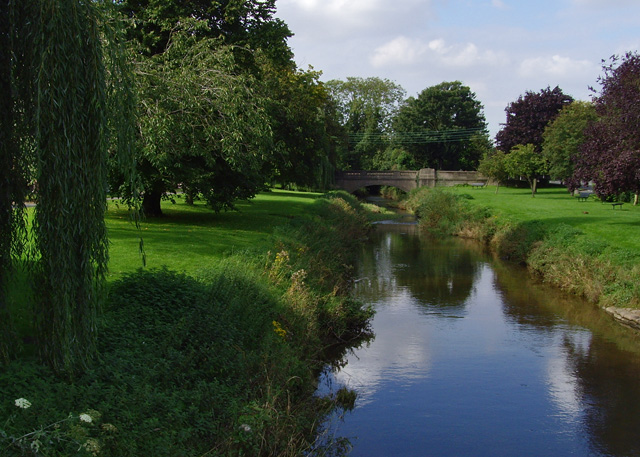
- River Eau, Scotter

Location
- Country: England
- Counties: Lincolnshire

Physical characteristics
- Source
  - location: Harpswell, Lincolnshire
  - coordinates: 53.39869°N 0.60630°W
- Mouth
  - location: Susworth, Lincolnshire
  - coordinates: 53.519612°N 0.738527°W
- Length: 24 km (15 mi)
- Basin size: 125 km^{2} (48 sq mi)

Basin features
- Tributaries
  - left: Northorpe Beck
  - right: Dar Beck, Manton Sewer

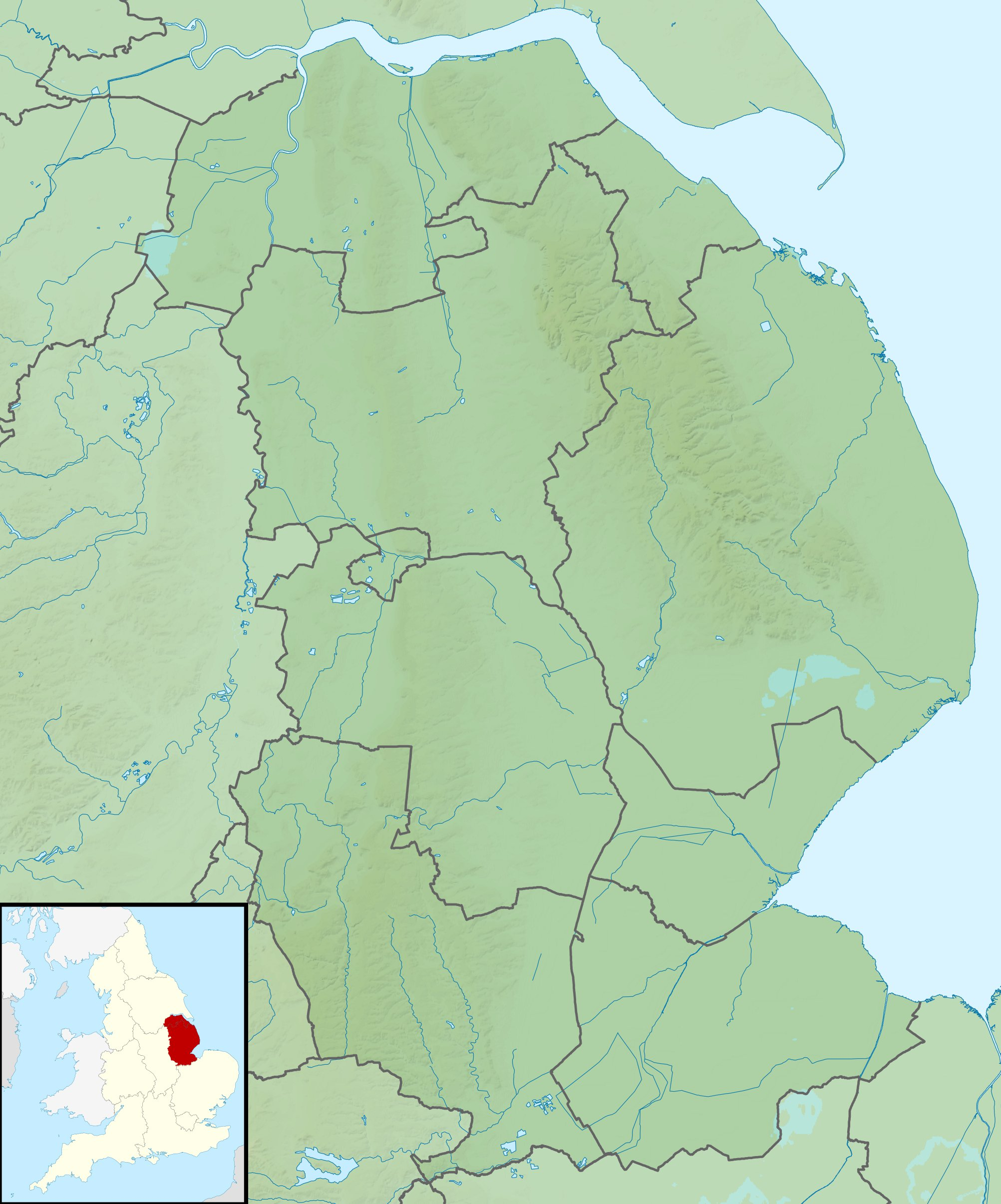
Map showing the location of Scotter, Source and Outfall to the Trent within Lincolnshire

The River Eau (/juː/ YOO) is a 15-mile-long (24 km) tributary of the River Trent that flows through Lincolnshire, England.

The Eau catchment lies between that of the Bottesford Beck to the north, and the River Witham to the south and east, and covers an area of 125 square kilometres (48 square miles). The river is one of the few notable streams that drain the right bank of the tidal Trent.

The source of the river is near Harpswell, at the foot of the Lincolnshire Edge, and it joins the tidal River Trent at Susworth. Unlike other rivers that drain into the tidal Trent, there is no pumping station associated with the outfall, it relies on gravity to discharge during periods of tidal low water.

The Eau flows through the village of Scotter, which has a history of being flooded by the river; the most recent occasion was in June 2007.

The river is also important for the drainage of the flat low-lying agricultural land that surrounds it, with some 2000 hectares or 20 square kilometres (7.7 square miles) of the Gainsborough Internal Drainage Board district, relying on the Eau for this function. Whilst the drains that discharge into the Eau are maintained by the Drainage Board, the river is the responsibility of the Environment Agency being designated as a Main river.

Its tributaries are Northorpe Beck, Manton Sewer and Dar Beck.

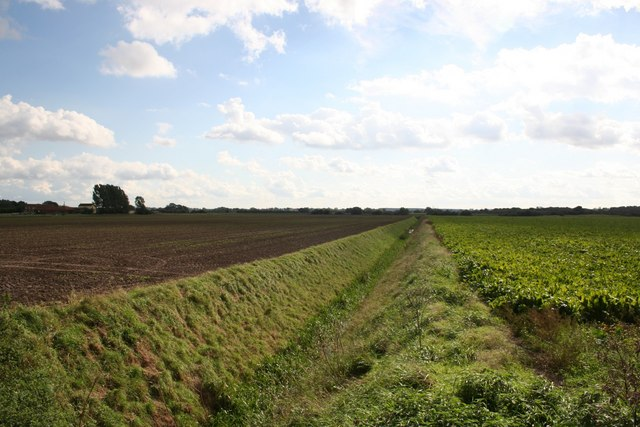
West Common Drain - Typical drain leading to the Eau

== See also ==
- Barlings Eau
- Bourne Eau
- Great Eau
- Long Eau
