= Stockwith =

Stockwith may refer to the following places in England:

- East Stockwith, in Lincolnshire
- West Stockwith, in Nottinghamshire
