= Scotton, Lincolnshire =

Village and civil parish in the West Lindsey district Lincolnshire, England

Coordinates: 53.481°N 0.660°W

Scotton
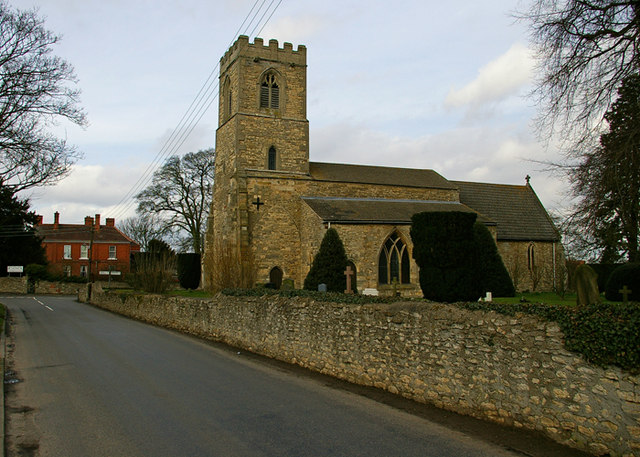
- Church of St Genewys, Scotton

- Location within Lincolnshire
- Population: 642 (2011)
- OS grid reference: SK890990
  - London: 140 mi (230 km) S
- District: West Lindsey
- Shire county: Lincolnshire
- Region: East Midlands
- Country: England
- Sovereign state: United Kingdom
- Post town: Gainsborough
- Postcode district: DN21
- Police: Lincolnshire
- Fire: Lincolnshire
- Ambulance: East Midlands
- UK Parliament: Gainsborough

Scotton is a village and civil parish in the West Lindsey district Lincolnshire, England. It is situated 7 mi (11 km) south from Scunthorpe, 14 mi (23 km) north-west from Market Rasen, and 1 mi (1.6 km) south from the larger village of Scotter. The western boundary of the parish is formed by part of the A159 Gainsborough to Scunthorpe road.

In 1086, Scotton was mentioned in the Domesday Book as a settlement in the Hundred of Corringham within the county of Lincolnshire. At that time, its population comprised 71 households which made it in the top fifth of recorded settlements by population size. The Murder of William de Cantilupe of Scotton in March 1375 became a cause célèbre owing to his links to the crown and the unusual circumstances of his death.

The 2001 Census recorded a population of 531 for the civil parish, increasing to 642 at the 2011 census.

The ecclesiastical parish is in the Church of England Diocese of Lincoln, Archdeaconry of Stow and Manlake Deanery. The church is dedicated to St Genewys. Historically, the parish was in the wapentake of Corringham, and following the Poor Law reforms of the early 19th century was placed in the Gainsborough Poor Law Union.
