= Susworth =

Hamlet in the West Lindsey district of Lincolnshire, England

Coordinates: 53.509346°N 0.741018°W

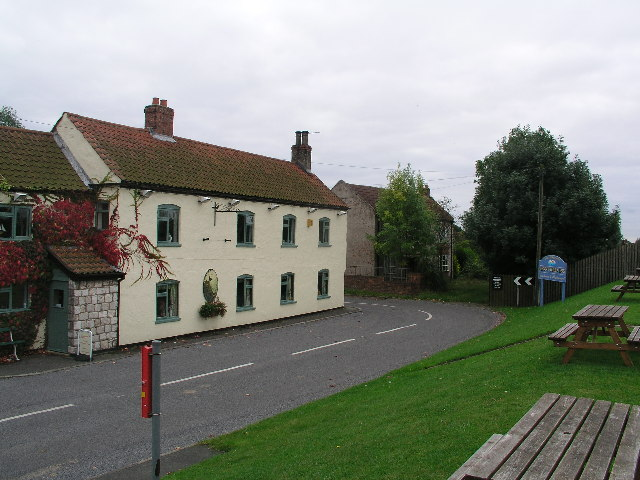
- Inn at Susworth

- Location within Lincolnshire
- OS grid reference: SE835021
  - London: 140 mi (230 km) S
- Civil parish: Scotter
- District: West Lindsey
- Shire county: Lincolnshire
- Region: East Midlands
- Country: England
- Sovereign state: United Kingdom
- Post town: SCUNTHORPE
- Postcode district: DN17
- Dialling code: 01724
- Police: Lincolnshire
- Fire: Lincolnshire
- Ambulance: East Midlands
- UK Parliament: Gainsborough

Susworth is a hamlet in the West Lindsey district of Lincolnshire, England. It is on the east bank of the River Trent, 3 miles (5 km) west from Scotter, in which civil parish it lies. The nearest large towns are Gainsborough, approximately 7 miles (11 km) to the south, and Scunthorpe 7 miles to the north-east.

This settlement documented as 'Susworth' was recorded c.1200, parts of which were considered associated with East Ferry.

In the second half of the 18th century, before the establishment of the Methodist chapel, invited Wesleyan preachers, one of whom was John Wesley, used a private house in the hamlet.

Susworth is recorded in the 1872 White's Directory as a hamlet of Scotter, others being Scotterthorpe and Cotehouses. There were six farmers in the hamlet, one of whom was also a blacksmith. There was the licensed victualler of the White Horse public house who was also a coal merchant, a further coal merchant, two shopkeepers, a joiner & wheelwright, a corn miller, a maltster, and a foreman maltster.

In 1885 Susworth contained a Primitive Methodist chapel. Occupations included ten farmers, a shopkeeper, wheelwright, blacksmith, and the landlord of the White Horse public house. By 1933 there were two Methodist chapels and a church reading room. The number of farmers had dropped to five, with one smallholder. A shop and the White Horse pub still existed.

Susworth soldiers killed in the First World War received no memorial within the village; at least eleven Susworth men survived the war.

The village contains a centre for civil marriages run by North Lincolnshire Council, a riverside inn and a post box.
