= Cultural depictions of Cnut =

Cnut the Great has been depicted in a number of fictional works.

- Alfgar the Dane; or the Second Chronicle of Æscendune: a Tale of the Days of Edmund Ironside (1875) by Augustine David Crake. Depicts the struggle for supremacy over the English throne, from 1002 to 1018. Covering the reigns of Æthelred the Unready, Edmund Ironside, Sweyn Forkbeard, and Canute. The story is told in diary form by a fictional narrator. The main events take place in Carisbrooke, Dorchester on Thames, Dorchester Abbey, and Abingdon Abbey.
- The Ward of King Canute (1903) by Ottilie A. Liljencrantz. Covers events of the years 1016–1017, focusing on the final struggle between Canute and Edmund Ironside. The Battle of Assandun and its consequences are prominently featured.
- Cnut is featured in the historical novel A Hollow Crown: The Story of Emma, Queen of Saxon England (2004, also published as The Forever Queen) by Helen Hollick. The protagonist is his wife Emma of Normandy. It covers her life, including her marriage to Cnut.
- The story of King Canute and the waves is the subject of numerous paintings and has entered proverbial use.
- The Genesis song "Can-Utility and the Coastliners" from the 1972 album Foxtrot relates the story of King Canute and the waves. "They told of one who tired of all singing Praise him, praise him / We heed not flatterers, he cried"
- Canute appears in the manga Vinland Saga, originally as a timid Danish prince with bishōnen traits, along with his strong Christianity. However, later on in the story, he develops a drastic personality change and becomes a strong ruler. His attempt to stop the waves of the sea is also featured, but in a different philosophical approach than the usual for the aforementioned legend.

== Sources ==
- Baker, Ernest Albert (1914), A Guide to Historical Fiction, George Routledge and sons
- Nield, Jonathan (1925), A Guide to the Best Historical Novels and Tales, G. P. Putnam's sons, ISBN 0833725092
