= King Cnut and the tide =

Apocryphal anecdote

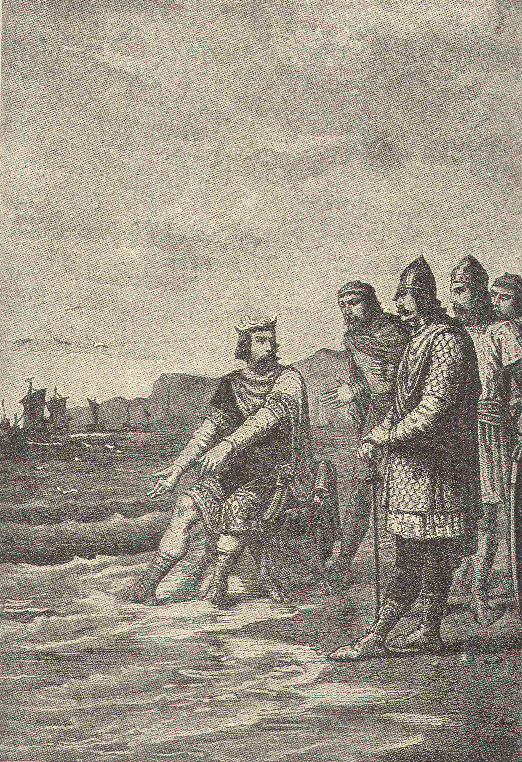
Canute Rebukes His Courtiers by Alphonse-Marie-Adolphe de Neuville

The story of King Cnut and the tide is an apocryphal anecdote meant to illustrate the piety or humility of King Cnut the Great (also written as Canute), recorded in the 12th century by Henry of Huntingdon. In the story, Cnut demonstrates to his flattering courtiers that he has no control over the elements (the incoming tide), explaining that secular power is vain compared with the supreme power of God. The episode is frequently alluded to in contexts where the futility of "trying to stop the tide" of an inexorable event is pointed out.

The story is commonly misconceived as suggesting that Cnut believed he had supernatural powers over natural phenomena. Such usage usually casts some modern figure, often a politician, as a delusionally arrogant Cnut. Huntingdon's story, however, was intended to emphasise Cnut's humility by demonstrating to his courtiers his inability to control nature.

== Episode ==
Henry of Huntingdon tells the story as one of three examples of Cnut's "graceful and magnificent" behaviour (outside of his bravery in warfare), the other two being his arrangement of the marriage of his daughter to the later Holy Roman Emperor and the negotiation of a reduction in tolls on the roads across Gaul to Rome at the imperial coronation of 1027.

In Huntingdon's account Cnut set his throne by the sea shore and commanded the incoming tide to halt and not to wet his feet and robes. Yet "continuing to rise as usual [the tide] dashed over his feet and legs without respect to his royal person. Then the king leapt backwards, saying: 'Let all men know how empty and worthless is the power of kings, for there is none worthy of the name, but He whom heaven, earth, and sea obey by eternal laws.'" He then hung his gold crown on a crucifix and never wore it again "to the honour of God the almighty King".

Later historians repeated the story, with most of them adjusting it to have Cnut more clearly aware that the tides would not obey him and staging the scene to rebuke the flattery of his courtiers.

There are also earlier parallels in Celtic stories of men who commanded the tides: Saint Illtud of Glamorgan, Maelgwn, king of Gwynedd, and Tuirbe of Tuirbe's Strand in Brittany.

== Proverbial reference ==
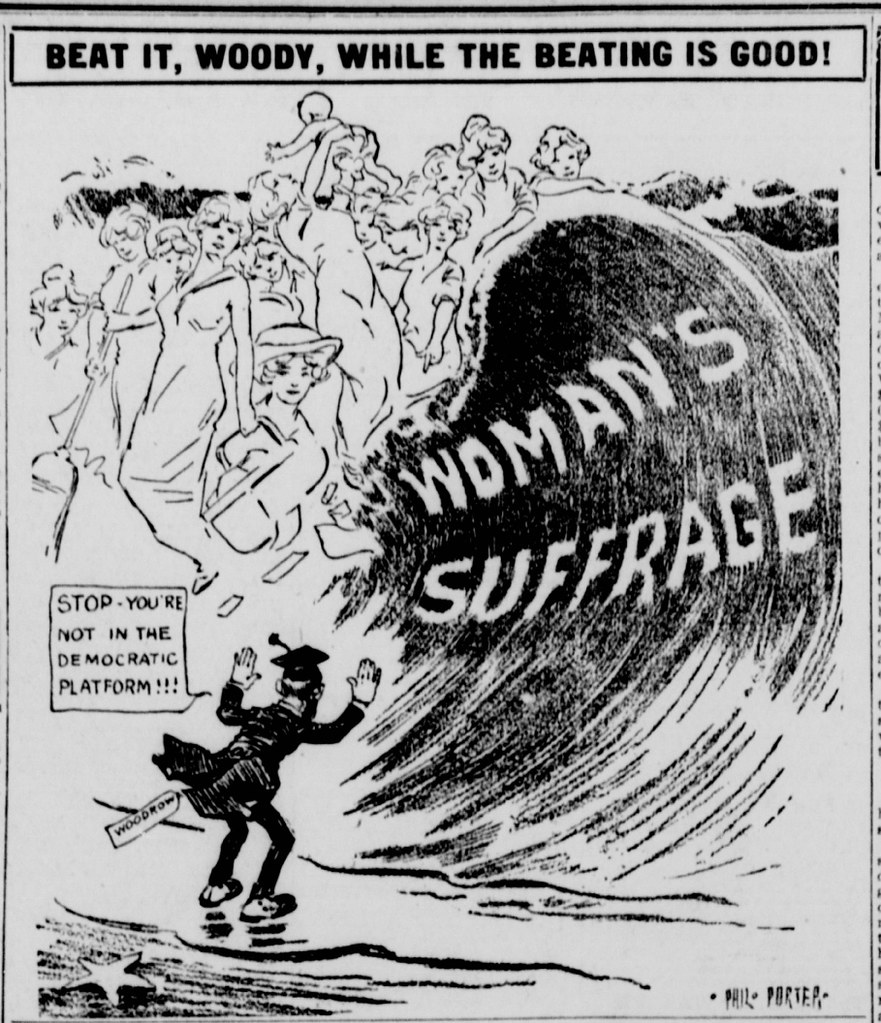
1914 cartoon depicts Woodrow Wilson trying to hold back the rising tide of support for Women's suffrage in the United States.

Proverbial reference to the legend in modern journalism or politics usually casts the story in terms of "Cnut's arrogance" of "attempting to stop the tide". As to usage, however, The Economist's Style Guide writes:

Canute's exercise on the seashore was designed to persuade his courtiers of what he knew to be true but they doubted, i.e. that he was not omnipotent. Don't imply he was surprised to get his feet wet.

It was cited, for example, by Stacy Head as typifying the New Orleans city council's response to Hurricane Katrina (2005), and by Mark Stephens in reference to Ryan Giggs as "the King Cnut of football" for his attempts to stop "the unstoppable tide of information" on the internet in the 2011 British privacy injunctions controversy. This, and many other popular representations involving politicians, are a misrepresentation of Huntingdon's account, in which Cnut uses the tide to demonstrate precisely his inability to control the elements and his deference to the greater authority of God.

Theodore Dalrymple refers to the story, without misattributing motives of arrogance to Cnut, in the context of British reactions to the annexation of Crimea by the Russian Federation in 2014, saying

Political power or office often gives those who possess it the illusion that they control events. That, after all, is the reason why the story of King Canute retains, and will always retain, its relevance to the current political situation.

Warren Burger, the Chief Justice of the United States, mentions Cnut in the 1980 decision Diamond v. Chakrabarty (447 U.S. 303), stating the denial of a patent for a micro-organism "is not likely to put an end to genetic research". Burger likens doing so to Cnut commanding the tides.

Author C.S. Forester has his character, Horatio Hornblower, compare the limits of the powers of "His Majesty" (implicitly referring to King George III) to his "illustrious predecessor", King Cnut, by contemplating His Majesty's inability to control the tides in Hornblower and the Atropos, the fifth book (by story date) of the Hornblower Saga. The monarch's inability to control the tides is ironically juxtaposed to the fact he otherwise "ruled the waves" through naval might, as recently (in the story) demonstrated by the British victory at the Battle of Trafalgar.

== Historicity and possible location ==
The contemporary Encomium Emmae Reginae has no mention of the episode, which has been taken as indicating its ahistoricity, as it would seem that so pious a dedication might have been recorded there since the same source gives an "eye-witness account of his lavish gifts to the monasteries and poor of St Omer when on the way to Rome, and of the tears and breast-beating which accompanied them".

Goscelin, writing later in the 11th century, instead has Cnut place his crown on a crucifix at Winchester one Easter with no mention of the sea and "with the explanation that the king of kings was more worthy of it than he". Nevertheless, there may be a "basis of fact, in a planned act of piety" behind this story.

On the other hand, Malcolm Godden says the story is simply "a 12th Century legend... and those 12th Century historians were always making up stories about kings from Anglo-Saxon times".

The site of the episode is often identified as Thorney Island (now known as Westminster), where Cnut set up a royal palace during his reign over London. Thorney Island is also a small peninsula within Chichester harbour, very close to another claimed location, Bosham, and conflictingly a sign on Southampton city centre's Canute Road reads, "Near this spot AD 1028 Canute reproved his courtiers". Other traditions place this episode on the north coast of the Wirral, which at the time was part of Mercia, or in the River Trent at Gainsborough, attempting to stop the aegir, a tidal bore. However, the locations attributed to this tale have since been put to debate as "Indeed it would be hard to find a local habitation for the story, because, in lands where courtiers flatter so grossly, the tide does not rise so fast and so far."

== See also ==
- Cultural depictions of Cnut the Great
- Xerxes I's whipping of the Hellespont
