= Scotterthorpe =

Hamlet in Lincolnshire, England

Coordinates: 53.507332°N 0.68033°W

- Location within Lincolnshire
- OS grid reference: SE876019
  - London: 150 mi (240 km) S
- Civil parish: Scotter
- District: West Lindsey
- Shire county: Lincolnshire
- Region: East Midlands
- Country: England
- Sovereign state: United Kingdom
- Post town: GAINSBOROUGH
- Postcode district: DN21
- Dialling code: 01724
- Police: Lincolnshire
- Fire: Lincolnshire
- Ambulance: East Midlands
- UK Parliament: Gainsborough

Scotterthorpe is a hamlet in the civil parish of Scotter and the West Lindsey district of Lincolnshire, England. It is 2.5 miles (4.0 km) south from the M180 motorway, 9 miles (14 km) north-east from Gainsborough, 5 miles (8 km) south from Scunthorpe, and 1 mile (1.6 km) north-east from the village of Scotter.

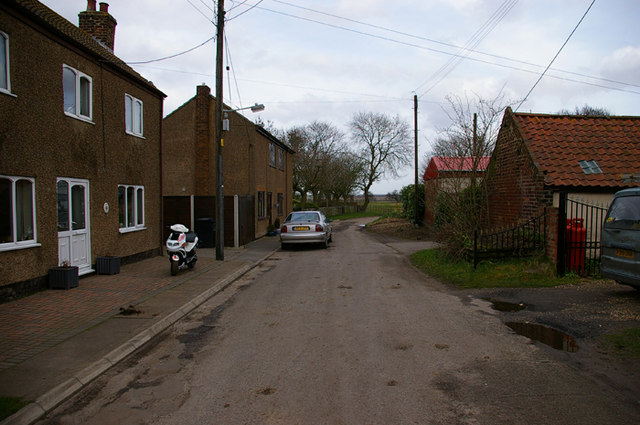
Scotterthorpe

In the 1086 Domesday Book Scotterthorpe is written as "Scaltorp", in the West Riding of Lindsey and the Hundred of Corringham. It comprised 12 households, 4 villagers and 8 freemen, with 2 ploughlands and a meadow of 30 acres (0 km^{2}). In 1066 Alnoth and Eskil were Lords of the Manor, which, by 1086, had been transferred to the Abbey of St Peter, Peterborough, which was also Tenant-in-chief. Mills states that the name of village of "Scalthorpe" derives from the Old Scandinavian: "an outlying farmstead or hamlet of a man called Skalli".

English Heritage calls an earlier deserted medieval village of Scotterthorpe, "Scawthorpe", being just south-west of the present settlement, with evidence of tofts (homesteads with land), and indicating that there is no mention of its existence later than 1100 CE.

Scotterthorpe is recorded in the 1872 White's Directory as a hamlet of Scotter, others being Susworth and Cotehouses. Revenue and taxes came from the "Town and Constable's Land", created after the early 19th- century enclosure of Scotter, with above 9 acres (0.04 km^{2}) given to Scotterthorpe to support the hamlet as a constablewick [historically an area of land under the charge and jurisdiction of an appointed constable who would oversee parish civil and criminal law, and church law]. There were nine farmers in the hamlet.
