= Walkerith =

Hamlet in Lincolnshire, England

Coordinates: 53.427435°N 0.816088°W

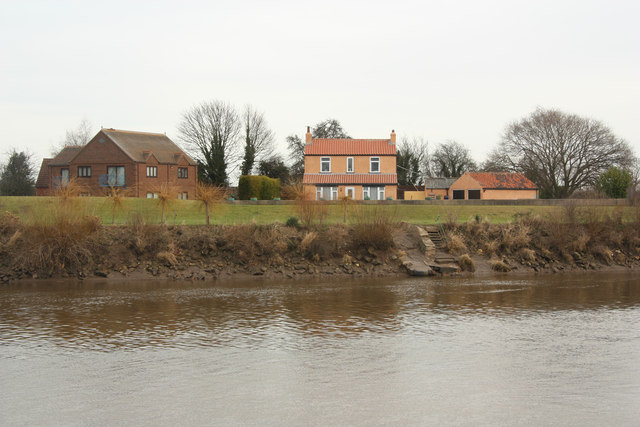
- Walkerith from the River Trent

- Location within Lincolnshire
- OS grid reference: SK787929
  - London: 135 mi (217 km) S
- District: West Lindsey
- Shire county: Lincolnshire
- Region: East Midlands
- Country: England
- Sovereign state: United Kingdom
- Post town: GAINSBOROUGH
- Postcode district: DN21
- Police: Lincolnshire
- Fire: Lincolnshire
- Ambulance: East Midlands
- UK Parliament: Gainsborough

Walkerith is a hamlet within the civil parish of East Stockwith, in the West Lindsey district of Lincolnshire, England. It lies on the east bank of the River Trent, 2.5 miles (4.0 km) north-west from Gainsborough and 1.5 miles (2.4 km) south from East Stockwith.

The name 'Walkerith' derives from the Old English for 'landing place of a fuller'.

Walkerith is recorded in the 1872 White's Directory as a small village and township in the Soke of Kirton, with a population of 80 in 252 acres (1 km^{2}) of land. Trades listed included a boat builder, the licensed victualler of the Ferry Hotel, and four farmers.

In 1885, Kelly's Directory recorded the village as a township within the ecclesiastical parish of East Stockwith, with its own ferry across the Trent, an area of 253 acres (1 km^{2}), an 1881 population of 87, and a Wesleyan chapel built in 1834. Prior to 1866 Walkerwith was, for administrative purposes, a township, afterwards a civil parish.
