= Wildsworth =

Village and civil parish in the West Lindsey district of Lincolnshire, England

Coordinates: 53.472339°N 0.78381908°W

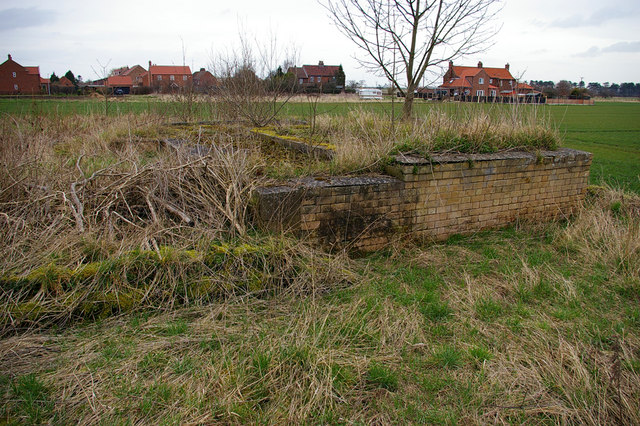
- Ruins of St John's Church, Wildsworth

- Location within Lincolnshire
- OS grid reference: SK808979
  - London: 150 mi (240 km) S
- District: West Lindsey
- Shire county: Lincolnshire
- Region: East Midlands
- Country: England
- Sovereign state: United Kingdom
- Post town: Gainsborough
- Postcode district: DN21
- Police: Lincolnshire
- Fire: Lincolnshire
- Ambulance: East Midlands
- UK Parliament: Gainsborough

Wildsworth is a village and civil parish in the West Lindsey district of Lincolnshire, England. It is situated on the eastern bank of the River Trent, and approximately 5 miles (8 km) north from Gainsborough. The population is included in the civil parish of East Ferry.

== History ==
The name 'Wildsworth' means 'enclosure of a man named Wifel'.

Wildsworth is not mentioned in the 1086 Domesday Book, although an earlier settlement is indicated by finds of 2nd- to 4th-century Roman pottery and building material. Later evidence of settlement at Wildsworth is in late 12th-century documentation – an early 14th-century chapel is recorded as founded, although no ground evidence for this and the medieval settlement have been found. It was only in the 19th century that Wildsworth size and population, through censuses, was indicated. Previously observed cropmarks in the area show evidence of channels and banks associated with post-medieval warping – controlled flooding of land to increase fertility.

In 1870-72 Wildsworth was described as being a hamlet within the parish of Laughton, with a population of 150 in 27 houses.

In 1885 Kelly's Directory reported Wildsworth again as a hamlet in the parish of Laughton, and with a population of 130. A chapel of ease to St John, built in 1838, was described as of white brick in Norman style, comprising a chancel and nave, and polygonal tower with one bell. The late Lady William Gordon, Lady of the Manor, had provided for the chapel building at a cost of £450. Wildsworth contained two Wesleyan chapels: Primitive and Methodist. A mixed school at Wildsworth was built in 1875 at a cost of £200 provided by the Hon. Mrs Meynell-Ingram, Lady of the Manor of Laughton. The school had provision for 80 children and had an average attendance of 35. Wildsworth occupations consisted of 10 farmers.

St John's church was restored in 1896, and again in 1908 at a cost of £1000 provided by Hon. Frederick George Lindley Meynell. Population in 1921 was 111. By 1933 Wildsworth was a township with a land and water area of 1,039 acres (4.2 km^{2}), some of which worked by five farmers each with land over 150 acres (0.6 km^{2}).

The previous parish church of St John was demolished before 2000. It was Grade II listed on 31 March 1982. The church was built in 1838 to a design by Charles Biggs. It was of yellow brick and ashlar construction, and comprised a chancel, nave, vestry with boiler house – added in 1908 – west doorway, and a polygonal embattled tower surmounted by a short spire. The nave contained pilasters topped by pinnacles which divided the walls into three bays, and the chancel a 1916 stained glass east window by Charles Eamer Kempe.
