= Trent Aegir =

Tidal bore on the River Trent in England

Coordinates: 53.4456°N 0.8071°W

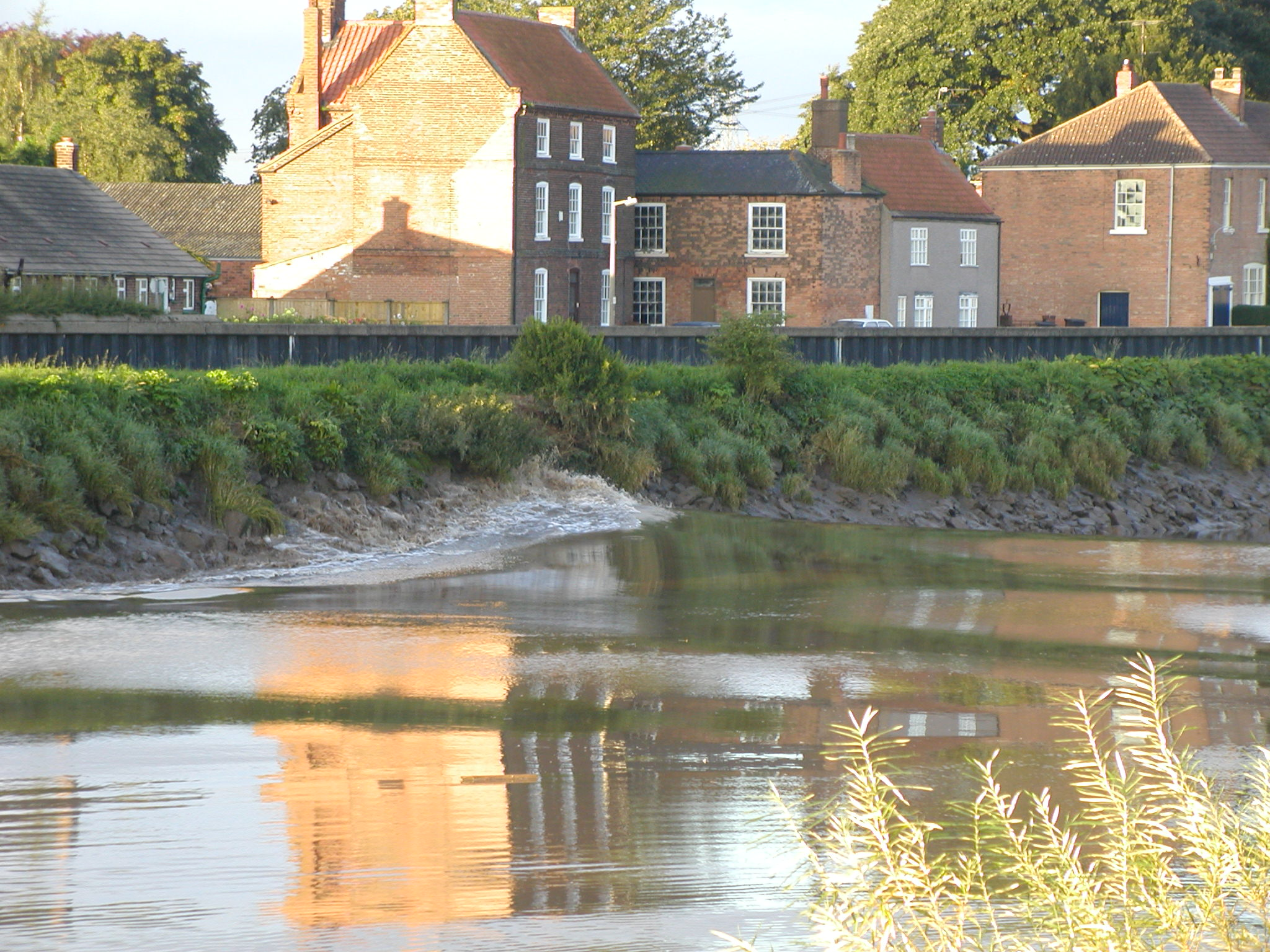
The Trent Aegir seen from West Stockwith, Nottinghamshire 20 September 2005

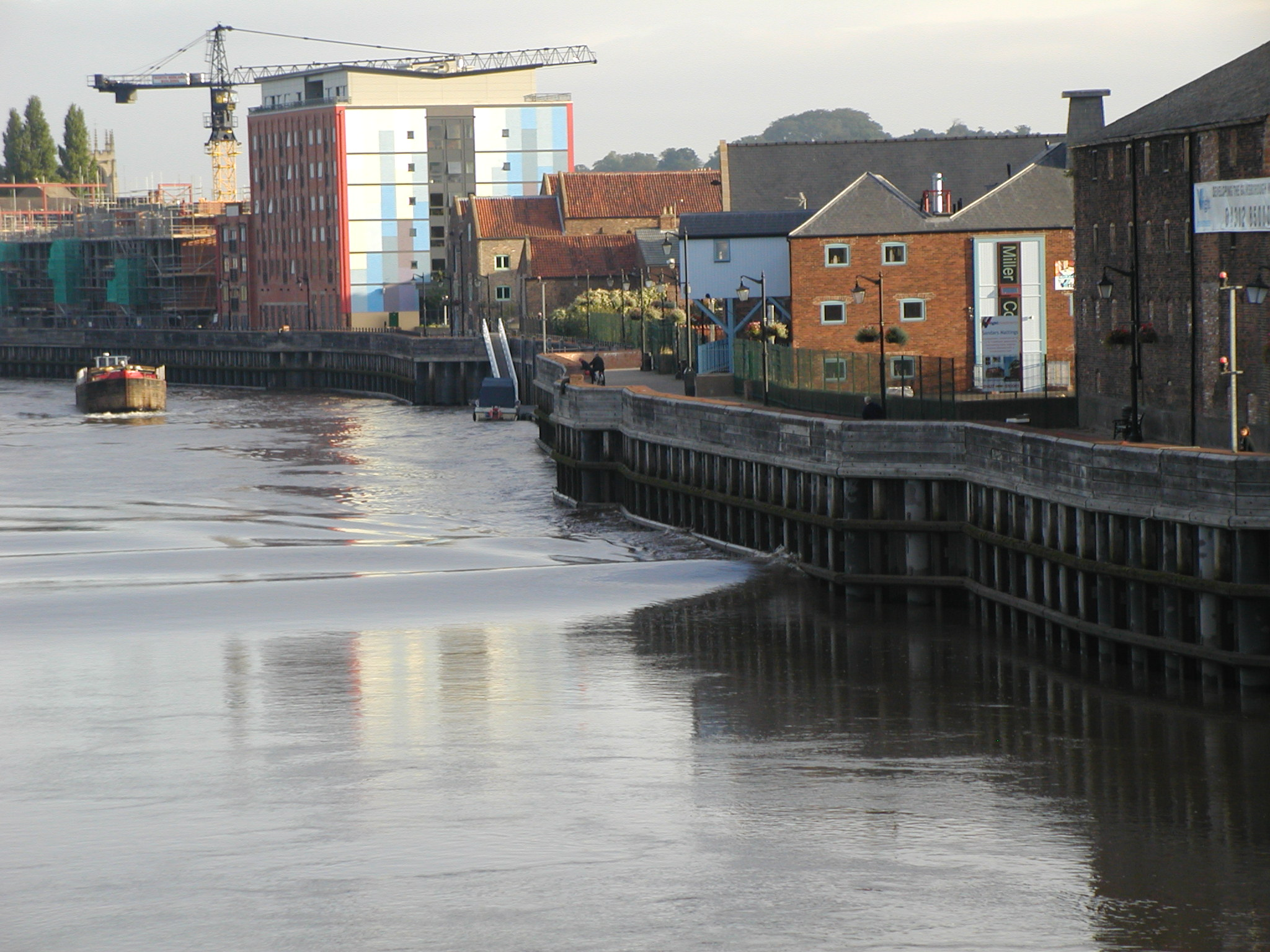
The Trent Aegir at Gainsborough, Lincolnshire, 20 September 2005

The Trent Aegir, also known as the Eagre, is a tidal bore on the River Trent in England. At certain times of the year, the lower tidal reaches of the Trent experience a moderately large bore (up to five feet (1.5m) high). It is said to take its name from Ægir, a personification of the sea in Norse mythology, although this is disputed. A more likely derivation is from Old English ēagor (“flood, stream, water”).

The Aegir occurs when a high spring tide meets the downstream flow of the river. The funnel shape of the river mouth exaggerates this effect, causing a large wave to travel upstream as far as Gainsborough, Lincolnshire, and sometimes beyond. The Aegir cannot travel much beyond Gainsborough as the shape of the river reduces the Aegir to little more than a ripple, and weirs north of Newark-on-Trent, Nottinghamshire stop its path completely.

The Aegir can be seen at Gainsborough, Morton, East Stockwith, West Stockwith and Owston Ferry. The Environment Agency used to publish predictions for the occurrence of the bore, but now no longer provide these. The United Kingdom Hydrographic Office (UKHO) provides useful tidal prediction information. The UKHO have a free tidal prediction service which provides tidal times for the forthcoming week. A private prediction of the Aegir is regularly updated on an informational site about the neighbouring community of Crowle, Lincolnshire.

It is alleged that King Cnut performed his purposely unsuccessful attempt to turn the tide back in the River Trent at Gainsborough. If this is the case, it is highly probable that Cnut was attempting to turn the Aegir tide.

The Aegir features in Chapter 5 of George Eliot's The Mill on the Floss (1860): "Above all, the great Floss, along which they wandered with a sense of travel, to see the rushing spring-tide, the awful Eagre, come up like a hungry monster."

Thomas Cooper references the Aegir (spelled 'Heygre') in his autobiography: "The 'Heygre' was our great excitement on the Trent. It used to be a very stirring sight when the tide was at the full. The huge rolling waves then dashed the shipping from their moorings, if they were not well-moored and managed; and boats were often crushed to pieces. The capture of porpoises on the river sometimes raised a crowd on the banks and at the wharves, to see the sailors signalise their courage and activity."
