= East Ferry =

Village and civil parish in the West Lindsey district of Lincolnshire, England

Coordinates: 53.4859°N 0.7732°W

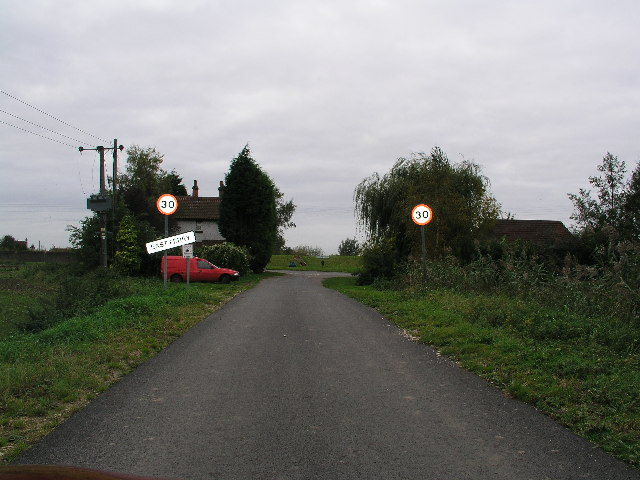
- Approaching the village from the east, the bank of the Trent visible across the road junction

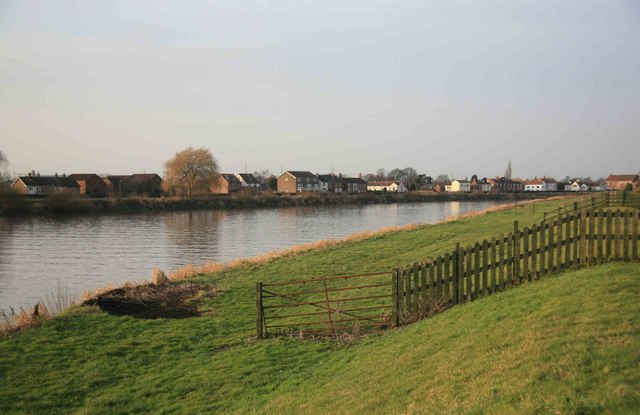
- River Trent near the site of the Ferry

- Location within Lincolnshire
- Population: 204 (2011)
- OS grid reference: SK815995
  - London: 135 mi (217 km) S
- Civil parish: East Ferry
- District: West Lindsey
- Shire county: Lincolnshire
- Region: East Midlands
- Country: England
- Sovereign state: United Kingdom
- Post town: Gainsborough
- Postcode district: DN21
- Police: Lincolnshire
- Fire: Lincolnshire
- Ambulance: East Midlands
- UK Parliament: Gainsborough

East Ferry is a village and civil parish in the West Lindsey district of Lincolnshire, England. It is situated 6 miles (10 km) west from Scotter, and on the eastern bank of the River Trent opposite Owston Ferry. The population of the civil parish (including Wildsworth) as at the 2011 census was 204.

A tidal bore known as the Trent Aegir can be observed on this stretch of the Trent.

== History ==
East Ferry was founded in the 13th century around a ferry crossing; the ferry ran until the 1940s. Previously it was also known as East Kinnard's Ferry, and was part of the Corringham Wapentake. A Medieval chapel in the village, dedicated to St Laurence, is described as decayed in the 16th century, but survived into the late 18th century. There were a further two chapels: one to St Mary (rebuilt about 1800), the other for Primitive Methodists.

In 1872 East Ferry was described as "a township in Scotter parish, Lincolnshire; 6 miles West of Scotter. Pop. 104."

An ancient logboat, found in 1903, was once in Scunthorpe Museum, but is now lost.
