= Scotter =

Village and civil parish in Lincolnshire, England

Coordinates: 53.498965°N 0.666311°W

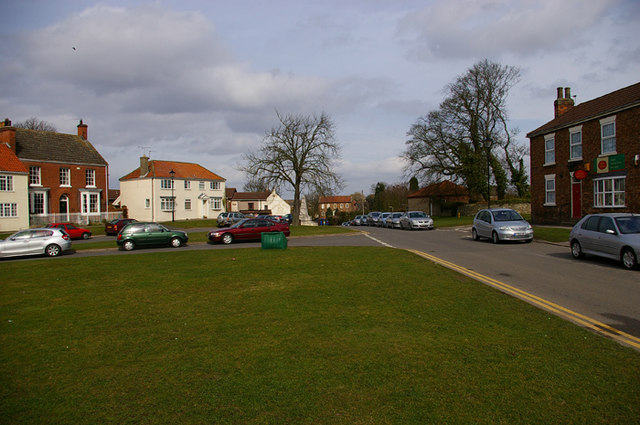
- Scotter Green

- Location within Lincolnshire
- Population: 3,068 (2011)
- OS grid reference: SE885010
  - London: 140 mi (230 km) S
- District: West Lindsey
- Shire county: Lincolnshire
- Region: East Midlands
- Country: England
- Sovereign state: United Kingdom
- Post town: GAINSBOROUGH
- Postcode district: DN21
- Dialling code: 01724
- Police: Lincolnshire
- Fire: Lincolnshire
- Ambulance: East Midlands
- UK Parliament: Gainsborough

Scotter is a large village and civil parish in West Lindsey, Lincolnshire, England, situated between Scunthorpe and Gainsborough.

The population of the parish was recorded as 2,591 in the 2001 census, increasing to 3,065 at the 2011 census.

The parish church is dedicated to St Peter. It is in the Scotter with East Ferry ecclesiastical parish in the Scotton and Scotter Group of parishes, in the Manlake Deanery. Other churches in the group are Scotton and Northorpe. On the other side of Trent is the Deanery of Axholme. The village has several shops, a village hall, a community centre, and a primary school. The school has approximately 280 pupils of age range 4–11. The village hall was opened on 12 July 1985 by Birgitte, Duchess of Gloucester.

== Geography ==
The civil parish contains the hamlet of Susworth, on the east bank of the River Trent, and that of Scotterthorpe, northeast from Scotter village. The parish is further north than (nearby) Kirton Lindsey. The A159 road, which connects the two towns, crosses the River Eau (a tributary of the Trent) in the village.

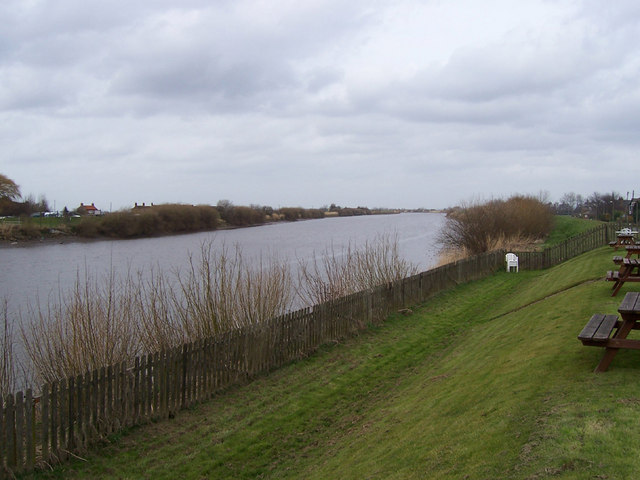
River Trent at Susworth

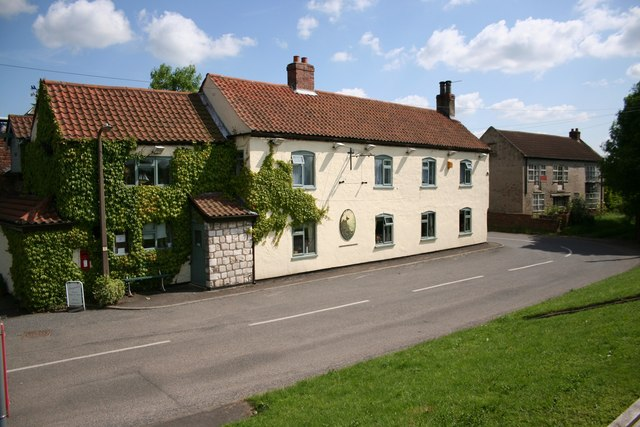
The Jenny Wren Inn at Susworth

Barlings is at the north-west corner of the village on the River Trent, and the Lincolnshire (West Lindsey) - North Lincolnshire boundary. The county, district and parish boundary follows eastwards along the River Eau passing north of Scotterthorpe. Messingham is the parish to the north. It crosses the north–south North Moor Road which becomes Scotter Road in Scunthorpe. It crosses the north–south Messingham Road (A159) then Kirton Road (B1400). A 770 yards (700 m) section of the B1400, between Kirton and Messingham, passes through the parish, and Lincolnshire. The boundary passes southwards, touching the western edge of Black Walk Nook, a wood. It passes north–south on the edge of Black Walk Plantation and crosses two roads called Kirton Road, meeting the parish of Scotton, which is south of Scotter.

The boundary is just the parish boundary from here to the Trent. It crosses Scotter Road north of Field House, passing north of Cockthorn Farm. It skirts the north edge of a wood, and crosses the A159 near two transmitter masts. It meets East Ferry to the south and skirts the northern edge of Laughton Forest, also known as Laughton Wood. It passes westward through the western section of the wood, crossing East Ferry Road near Wheatley House. It follows Ferry Barrier Bank westwards to East Ferry Ings Drain, which it follows to the Trent near Ings Farm. It passes along the east bank of the Trent through South Ings, then passes through Susworth, passing the Jenny Wrenn Inn and Walnut Tree Farm.
