= East Stockwith =

Village in Lincolnshire, England

Coordinates: 53.441455°N 0.802247°W

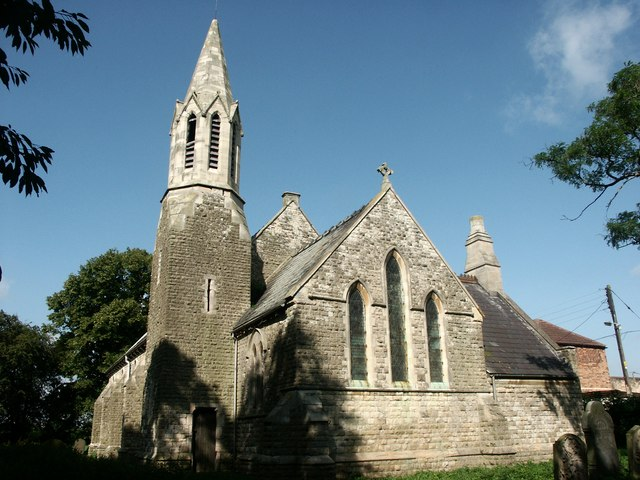
- St Peter's Church

- Location within Lincolnshire
- Population: 314 (2011 Census)
- OS grid reference: SK795945
  - London: 135 mi (217 km) S
- District: West Lindsey
- Shire county: Lincolnshire
- Region: East Midlands
- Country: England
- Sovereign state: United Kingdom
- Post town: GAINSBOROUGH
- Postcode district: DN21
- Dialling code: 01427
- Police: Lincolnshire
- Fire: Lincolnshire
- Ambulance: East Midlands
- UK Parliament: Gainsborough

East Stockwith is a village within the civil parish of East Stockwith, in the West Lindsey district of Lincolnshire, England. It lies on the River Trent, 3 miles (4.8 km) north-west of Gainsborough. The River Trent Aegir, a tidal bore, reaches the village. In 2001 it had a total resident population of 209, increasing to 314 at the 2011 census.

The hamlet and former civil parish of Walkerith, about 1.5 miles (2.4 km) to the south, is within East Stockwith parish.

Opposite East Stockwith on the River Trent is West Stockwith, a large village within the county boundaries of Nottinghamshire. The two villages were once connected by a ferry which stopped in 1953.

The village contains a church, a pub, The Ferry House, and two large arable farms growing mainly wheat and potatoes. The nearest town with schools and shops is Gainsborough. Local leisure activities include angling on the Trent, particularly for eels, and horse riding.
