= List of United Kingdom locations: Q =

The United Kingdom

This is part of the list of United Kingdom locations: a gazetteer of place names in the United Kingdom showing each place's locality and geographical coordinates.

== Qu ==
Location	Locality	Coordinates (links to map & photo sources)	OS grid reference
Quabbs	Shropshire	52.41°N 03.17°W	SO2080
Quabrook	East Sussex	51.08°N 00.05°E	TQ4434
Quadring	Lincolnshire	52.88°N 00.18°W	TF2233
Quadring Eaudike	Lincolnshire	52.88°N 00.15°W	TF2433
Quags Corner	West Sussex	50.98°N 00.77°W	SU8621
Quainton	Buckinghamshire	51.87°N 00.92°W	SP7420
Quakers Yard	Merthyr Tydfil	51.65°N 03.31°W	ST0996
Quaking Houses	Durham	54.84°N 01.72°W	NZ1850
Quality Corner	Cumbria	54.55°N 03.57°W	NX9819
Quarhouse	Gloucestershire	51.71°N 02.18°W	SO8702
Quarley	Hampshire	51.18°N 01.61°W	SU2743
Quarmby	Kirklees	53.64°N 01.83°W	SE1117
Quarndon	Derbyshire	52.96°N 01.51°W	SK3341
Quarndon Common	Derbyshire	52.96°N 01.51°W	SK3341
Quarrelton	Renfrewshire	55.82°N 04.52°W	NS4262
Quarrendon	Buckinghamshire	51.82°N 00.84°W	SP8015
Quarr Hill	Isle of Wight	50.72°N 01.20°W	SZ5692
Quarriers Village	Renfrewshire	55.85°N 04.62°W	NS3666
Quarrington	Lincolnshire	52.98°N 00.43°W	TF0544
Quarrington Hill	Durham	54.72°N 01.48°W	NZ3337
Quarry Bank	Dudley	52.47°N 02.10°W	SO9386
Quarrybank	Cheshire	53.18°N 02.68°W	SJ5465
Quarry Heath	Staffordshire	52.71°N 02.09°W	SJ9413
Quarry Hill	Staffordshire	52.60°N 01.66°W	SK2301
Quarrymill	Perth and Kinross	56.40°N 03.44°W	NO1125
Quarrywood	Moray	57.65°N 03.37°W	NJ1864
Quarter	South Lanarkshire	55.73°N 04.04°W	NS7251
Quarterbank	Perth and Kinross	56.36°N 03.75°W	NN9221
Quatford	Shropshire	52.50°N 02.39°W	SO7390
Quatquoy	Orkney Islands	59.01°N 03.09°W	HY3715
Quatt	Shropshire	52.48°N 02.36°W	SO7588
Quebec	Durham	54.78°N 01.72°W	NZ1843
Quebec	West Sussex	50.98°N 00.90°W	SU7721
Quedgeley	Gloucestershire	51.82°N 02.27°W	SO8114
Queen Adelaide	Cambridgeshire	52.40°N 00.29°E	TL5681
Queenborough	Kent	51.41°N 00.74°E	TQ9172
Queen Camel	Somerset	51.01°N 02.58°W	ST5924
Queen Charlton	Bath and North East Somerset	51.40°N 02.53°W	ST6367
Queen Dart	Devon	50.93°N 03.66°W	SS8316
Queenhill	Worcestershire	52.02°N 02.22°W	SO8536
Queen Oak	Dorset	51.06°N 02.32°W	ST7730
Queen's Bower	Isle of Wight	50.65°N 01.19°W	SZ5784
Queensbury	Bradford	53.76°N 01.86°W	SE0930
Queensbury	Harrow	51.58°N 00.29°W	TQ1889
Queen's Corner	West Sussex	51.01°N 00.78°W	SU8525
Queensferry or South Queensferry	City of Edinburgh	55.98°N 03.41°W	NT1278
Queensferry	Flintshire	53.20°N 03.03°W	SJ3168
Queen's Head	Shropshire	52.82°N 02.98°W	SJ3426
Queenslie	City of Glasgow	55.86°N 04.14°W	NS6665
Queen's Park	Bedfordshire	52.13°N 00.49°W	TL0349
Queen's Park	Cheshire	53.17°N 02.88°W	SJ4165
Queen's Park	Essex	51.63°N 00.41°E	TQ6796
Queen's Park	Lancashire	53.73°N 02.47°W	SD6927
Queen's Park	London	51.53°N 00.20°W	TQ2583
Queen's Park	Northamptonshire	52.25°N 00.90°W	SP7562
Queenstown	Lancashire	53.82°N 03.03°W	SD3237
Queen Street	Kent	51.17°N 00.40°E	TQ6845
Queensville	Staffordshire	52.79°N 02.10°W	SJ9322
Queensway	Fife	56.19°N 03.17°W	NO2701
Queenzieburn	North Lanarkshire	55.96°N 04.10°W	NS6977
Quemerford	Wiltshire	51.42°N 02.00°W	SU0069
Quendale	Shetland Islands	59.90°N 01.34°W	HU3713
Quendon	Essex	51.94°N 00.19°E	TL5130
Queniborough	Leicestershire	52.70°N 01.05°W	SK6412
Quenington	Gloucestershire	51.73°N 01.79°W	SP1404
Quernmore	Lancashire	54.02°N 02.74°W	SD5159
Queslett	Birmingham	52.54°N 01.91°W	SP0694
Quethiock	Cornwall	50.45°N 04.38°W	SX3164
Quhamm	Shetland Islands	60.39°N 01.25°W	HU4168
Quholm	Orkney Islands	58.98°N 03.32°W	HY2412
Quick	Tameside	53.52°N 02.04°W	SD9703
Quick Edge	Oldham	53.52°N 02.06°W	SD9603
Quick's Green	Berkshire	51.48°N 01.16°W	SU5876
Quidenham	Norfolk	52.44°N 00.97°E	TM0287
Quidhampton	Hampshire	51.24°N 01.27°W	SU5150
Quidhampton	Wiltshire	51.06°N 01.84°W	SU1130
Quilquox	Aberdeenshire	57.43°N 02.16°W	NJ9038
Quina Brook	Shropshire	52.89°N 02.71°W	SJ5233
Quinbury End	Northamptonshire	52.14°N 01.09°W	SP6250
Quine's Hill	Isle of Man	54.12°N 04.54°W	SC3473
Quinton	Dudley	52.45°N 02.03°W	SO9884
Quinton	Northamptonshire	52.17°N 00.87°W	SP7754
Quintrell Downs	Cornwall	50.40°N 05.04°W	SW8460
Quixhill	Staffordshire	52.96°N 01.85°W	SK1041
Quoditch	Devon	50.75°N 04.26°W	SX4097
Quoisley	Cheshire	53.00°N 02.68°W	SJ5445
Quoit	Cornwall	50.42°N 04.92°W	SW9262
Quorn or Quorndon	Leicestershire	52.73°N 01.17°W	SK5616
Quothquan	South Lanarkshire	55.63°N 03.60°W	NS9939
Quoyloo	Orkney Islands	59.06°N 03.32°W	HY2420
Quoyness	Orkney Islands	58.89°N 03.30°W	HY2502
Quoyness	Shetland Islands	60.21°N 01.29°W	HU3948
Quoys (Unst)	Shetland Islands	60.78°N 00.88°W	HP6112
Quoys (North Nesting)	Shetland Islands	60.32°N 01.13°W	HU4860
Quoys of Catfirth	Shetland Islands	60.26°N 01.20°W	HU4454
