= Gosberton Risegate =

Hamlet of Gosberton in Lincolnshire, England

Coordinates: 52.8547°N 0.192174°W

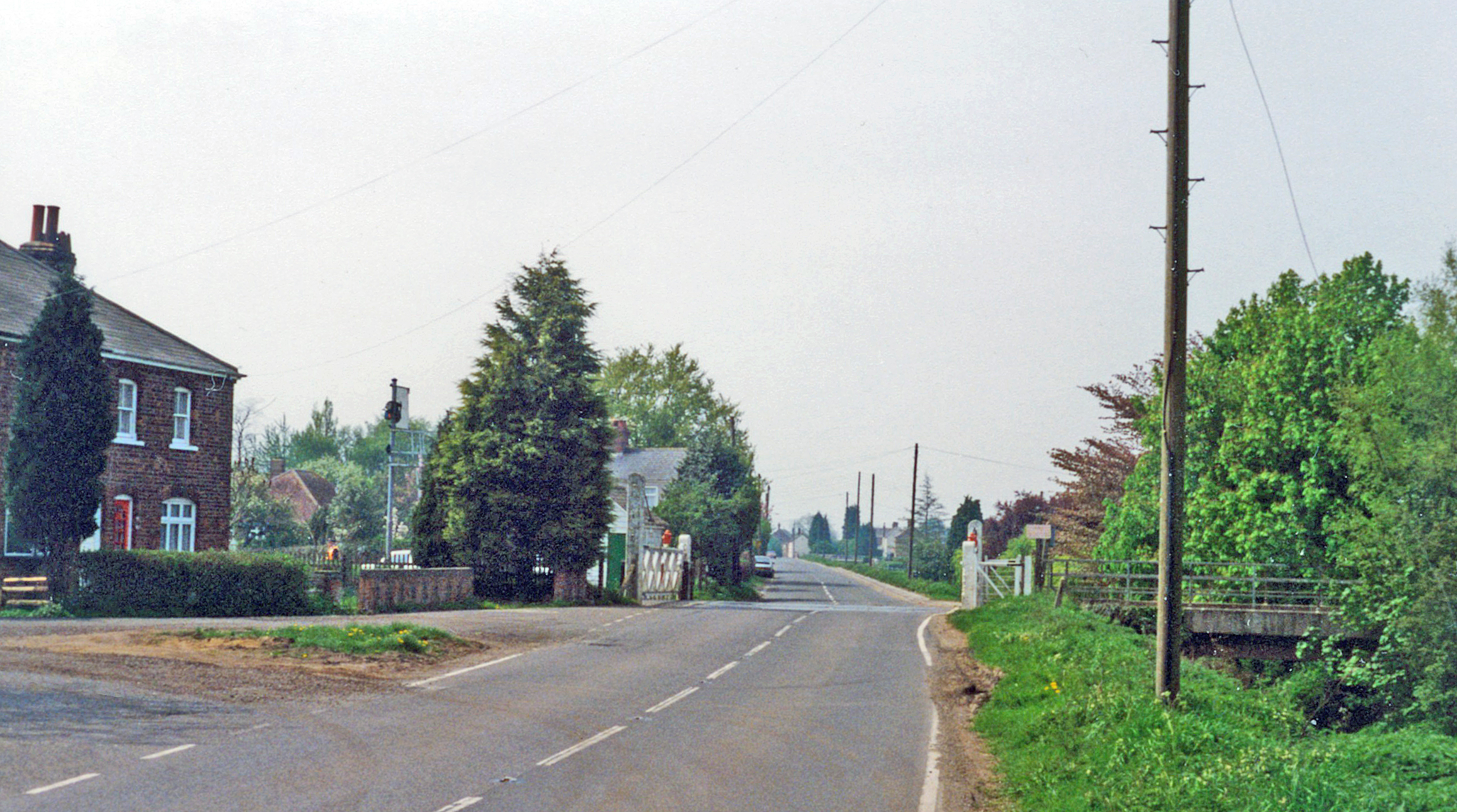
- Gosberton railway station in Gosberton Risegate

- Location within Lincolnshire
- OS grid reference: TF218301
  - London: 95 mi (153 km) S
- District: South Holland
- Shire county: Lincolnshire
- Region: East Midlands
- Country: England
- Sovereign state: United Kingdom
- Post town: SPALDING
- Postcode district: PE11
- Dialling code: 01775
- Police: Lincolnshire
- Fire: Lincolnshire
- Ambulance: East Midlands
- UK Parliament: South Holland and The Deepings

Gosberton Risegate or simply Risegate is a village in the civil parish of Gosberton and the South Holland district of Lincolnshire, England. It is 30 miles (50 km) south-east of the city of Lincoln, 5 miles (8 km) north of the town of Spalding, and 2 miles (3 km) west-southwest of the village of Gosberton.

Gosberton Risegate and the village of Gosberton Clough to the west are conjoined as a 2 miles (3 km) linear settlement on the east to west B1397 road which runs along the south side of Risegate Eau (drain). Within Gosberton Risegate the B1497 is named 'Risegate Road', and in Gosberton Clough, 'Clough Road', the villages separated at a bridge over the Risegate Eau at the junction with Chesboule Lane, running north, and Beach Lane, running south. The B1397 and the village is mirrored at the north of Risegate Eau by the parallel 'Siltside' (road). The Risegate Eau starts 3 miles (5 km) west at the South Forty-Foot Drain, then flows through the village, and reaches the River Welland at the Risegate Outfall sluice in Algarkirk Marsh, 5.5 miles (9 km) to the east.

== Amenities ==
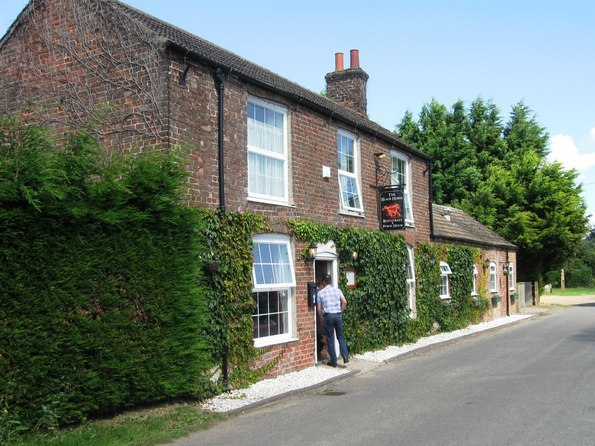
The Black Horse public house

Amenities, facilities and businesses include, on Risegate Road, a truck sales & service centre, a portable toilet company, a haulage company depot, a memorial masonry contractor, a wrought ironwork company, The Duke of York public house, and a farm at Cressy Hall at the west of the village. The site of the former Gosberton railway station, opened in 1882 and closed in 1961, today used for light industry and storage, is 180 yards (200 m) inside the village from the west, where a level crossing intersects the National Rail Peterborough–Lincoln line operated by East Midlands Railway, the line previously part of the GN and GE Joint Railway. On Hedgefield Hurn (road), which runs south-east from Risegate Road, is a farm, a window supplier and a plant nursery.

On Siltside is a funeral directors, and The Five Bells and The Black Horse public houses. Adjacent to The Black horse is The Marjoram Hall community centre.

The nearest school is Clough & Risegate Community Primary school in Gosberton Clough. Risegate is connected by bus to Gosberton, Quadring and Spalding.

In 1872 Risegate was described as a hamlet of Gosberton, and partly in the parish of Surfleet. It contained Wesleyan and Primitive Methodist chapels. There was a free school, founded 1681 by Robert Marjoram, who endowed it with just over 13 acres (0.05 km^{2}) of land, rented out for £46 yearly, this to pay for a schoolmaster to teach poor children of "Rysgate and about the Fen Ends in the parishes of Gosberton and Surfleet". By 1872 the school had fallen down but another was about to be rebuilt. Occupations listed at the time included sixteen farmers and a market gardener, a miller, a blacksmith, a wheelwright, a harness maker, two shopkeepers, one of whom was also a draper, and the other a flour dealer. There were public house licensed victuallers of the 'Duke of York', the 'Old Crane', 'The Ship' and the 'Five Bells'. The landlord of the 'Five Bells' was also a potato dealer, and that of 'The ship' was also a shopkeeper and a baker.

== Landmarks ==
In the west of the village, to the north of the B1397, is the Grade II* listed Cressy Hall, a three-storey brick house in Flemish bond Originally a moated medieval manor house, it had been rebuilt in 1695 by Sir Henry Heron, father to Henry Heron (MP), but burnt down. The present house dates to 1794. On Risegate road, 500 yards (460 m) southwest from Cressy Hall, is the Grade II red brick four-stage tower of the 19th-century Risegate tower corn mill, originally of four sails. Also on Risegate road, to the east from the junction with Beach Lane, is a Grade II 18th-century single-storey cottage of red brick. To the south from Risegate Road, on Hedgefield Hurn, is Panton House, of L-plan with two-storeys, three-bays with slate tile roof and sash windows, and which dates to about 1830. At 1.3 miles (2 km) southeast from Risegate, on Cheal Road, and at the side of a farm, is Cheal House with its associated listings of a fence, gate and wall piers. The L-plan house, of two storeys and three bays with sash windows, is of red brick laid in Flemish bond, and with a slate roof. The gate and fence railings are of cast iron, either end of which are brick piers supporting finials representing acorns. The house, which was altered in about 1840, dates to about 1800.

On Siltside is an unlisted 12 feet (4 m) high war memorial of celtic cross style and of Scottish marble, dedicated to the dead of the First and Second World Wars. It stands at the east of Siltside where it turns into Windmill Lane which runs to Westhorpe further north. To the west of the war memorial is a Grade II two-storey, three-bay house of red brick laid in Flemish bond, dating to 1804, and a Methodist Church, previously a United Free Methodist Church built in 1886. At the east of the village, and 500 yards north on Chesboule Lane, is the Grade II Chesspool House with attached cottage, dating to the 18th century, with early and late 19th-century additions. The house is two-storey and of red brick, laid in Flemish bond, and two bays; the cottage is of three bays. Beside the house and cottage is a listed 18th-century red brick barn of four bays and a pantile roof.
