= Gosberton Clough =

Village in Lincolnshire, England

Coordinates: 52.8520°N 0.216583°W

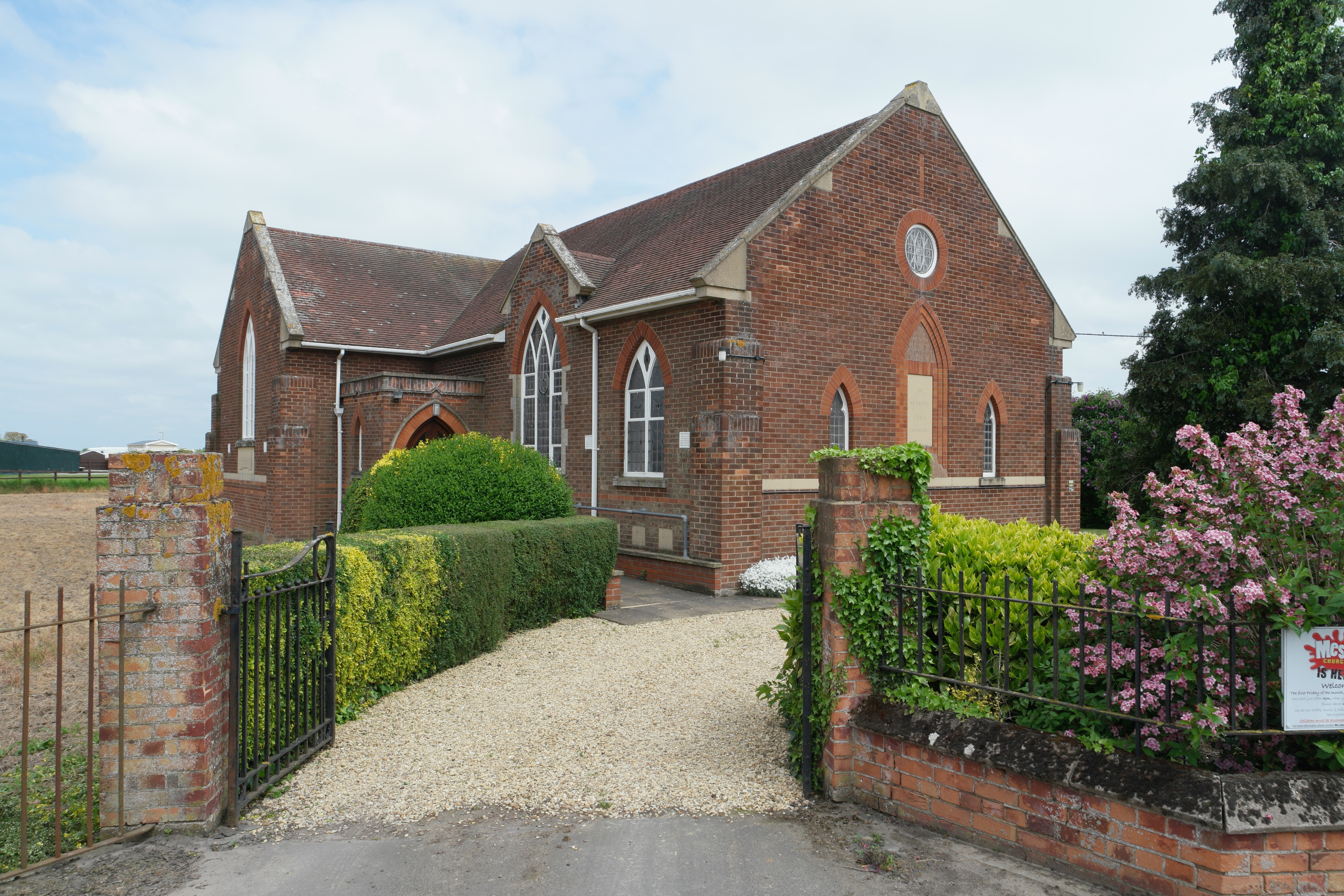
- The former Methodist Church, Gosberton Clough before its closure in 2024

- Location within Lincolnshire
- OS grid reference: TF201297
  - London: 95 mi (153 km) S
- District: South Holland
- Shire county: Lincolnshire
- Region: East Midlands
- Country: England
- Sovereign state: United Kingdom
- Post town: SPALDING
- Postcode district: PE11
- Dialling code: 01775
- Police: Lincolnshire
- Fire: Lincolnshire
- Ambulance: East Midlands
- UK Parliament: South Holland and The Deepings

Gosberton Clough is a village in the civil parish of Gosberton and the South Holland district of Lincolnshire, England. It is 30 miles (50 km) south-east of the city of Lincoln, 5 miles (8 km) north of the town of Spalding, and 3 miles (5 km) west-southwest of village of Gosberton.

Gosberton Clough and the village Gosberton Risegate to the east are conjoined as a 2 miles (3 km) linear settlement on the east to west B1397 road which runs along the south side of Risegate Eau (drain). Within Gosberton Clough the B1397 is named 'Clough Road', and in Risegate, 'Risegate Road', the villages separated at a bridge over the Risegate Eau at the junction with Chesboule Lane, running north, and Beach Lane, running south. The B1397 and the village is mirrored at the north of Risegate Eau by the parallel 'Siltside' (road). The Risegate Eau starts 2 miles (3 km) west at the South Forty-Foot Drain, then flows through the village, and reaches the River Welland at the Risegate Outfall sluice in Algarkirk Marsh, 7 miles (11 km) to the east. The north to south Hammond Beck intersects Risegate Eau at the west of the village, alongside of which is Beck Bank (road).

Amenities, facilities and businesses include, on Clough Rd, Gosberton Clough & Risegate County Primary School (built in 1878 for 200 children), and a small business park with tyre sales and timber sales outlets, a transport company, and a warehousing facility. A further transport company for mini-buses, taxis and light haulage is at the west of the village. There is also the Parish Church of St Gilbert and St Hugh with its church hall. On Siltside are two village farms, a motorsports' shop, and, at the west end of Siltside where the road turns north to become Beck Bank, the former Centenary Methodist Church which ceased to be a place of worship in late 2024.

Gosberton Clough is connected by bus to Gosberton, Quadring and Spalding.

In 1872 Gosberton Clough was described as containing a mission room, which was built in 1858 and enlarged in 1861. The only trade listed at the time was a blacksmith.

== Landmarks ==
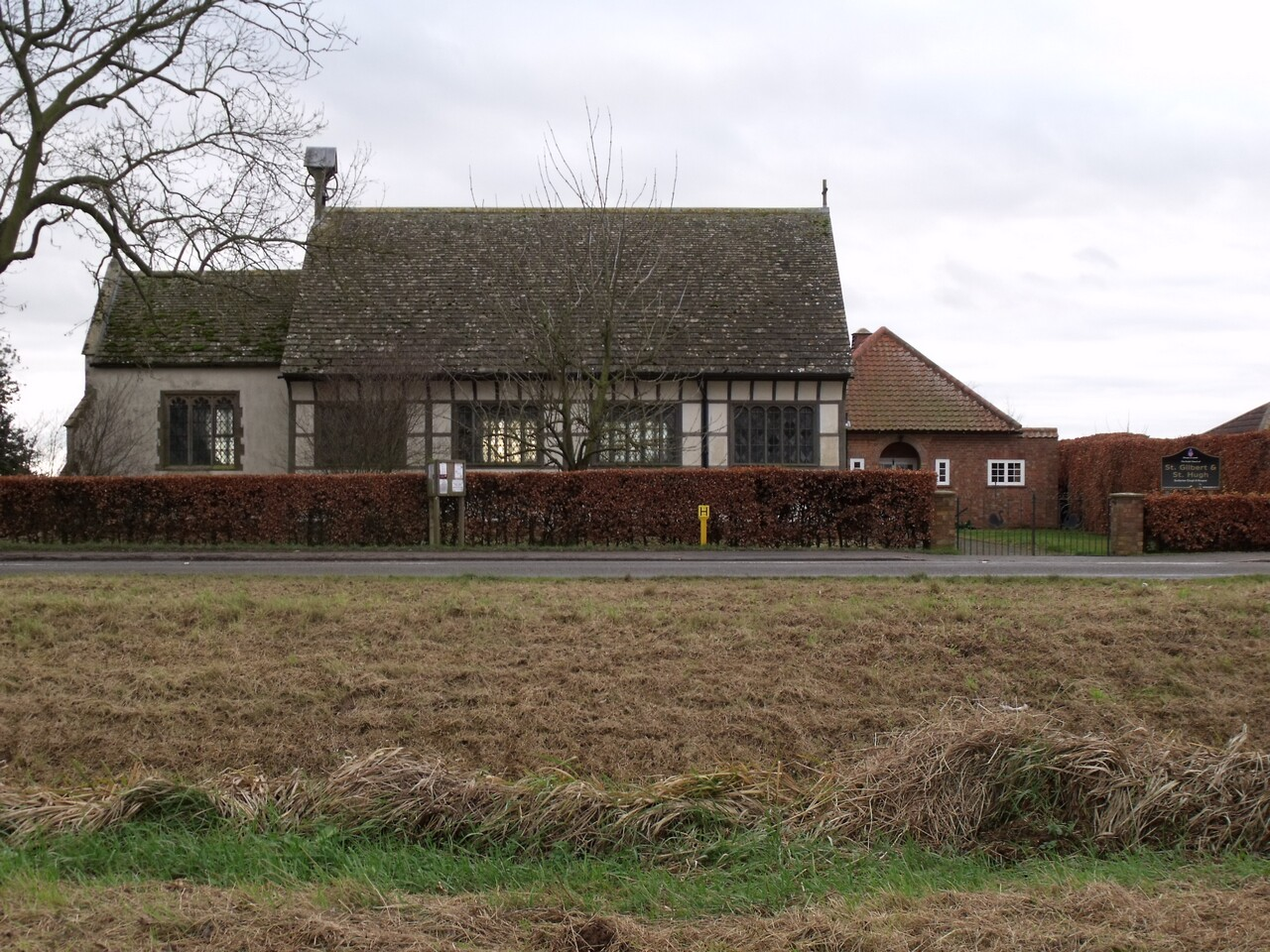
The Church of St Gilbert and St Hugh

The Church of St Gilbert and St Hugh, dating to 1902, was built by William Bucknall and Ninian Comper, and was Grade II listed in 1988, being described as a chapel of ease. Its construction is of timber framing on a brick plinth. It comprises a nave with bellcote, a chancel, vestry and south porch. A restoration of the church was begun in 2001.

In the church are four gilded wooden angels, carved and donated by Belgian refugees during World War I. Their restoration, by Will Kirk, was shown in an episode of the BBC Television programme The Repair Shop in April 2020.

At the south of Gosberton Clough on Beck Bank is 'Bank House', of two-storey and five bays, Grade II listed as c.1830 with some 20th-century alterations. At the time of listing in 1988 it was an old people's home.

A further Grade II property is Rigbolt House on Beck Bank 1 mile (1.6 km) south from the village. The house dates to the 16th century, with alterations in the 18th, 19th and 20th. The current house is mid-Georgian of two-storeys and three bays in T-plan, and of red brick laid in Flemish bond, with slate roof. The house was formerly a moated cell of the Gilbertine Order. Rigbolt House is today part of a farm; in the 19th-century it was part of a Gosberton hamlet of Rigbolt.
