= Quadring Eaudike =

Hamlet in the South Holland district of Lincolnshire, England

Coordinates: 52.8857°N 0.151970°W

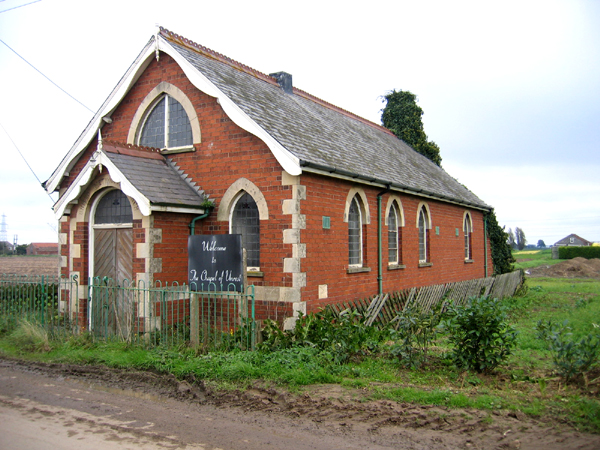
- United Methodist Church, Quadring Eaudike

- Location within Lincolnshire
- OS grid reference: TF244336
  - London: 95 mi (153 km) S
- Civil parish: Quadring
- District: South Holland, Lincolnshire
- Shire county: Lincolnshire
- Region: East Midlands
- Country: England
- Sovereign state: United Kingdom
- Post town: Spalding
- Postcode district: PE11
- Dialling code: 01775
- Police: Lincolnshire
- Fire: Lincolnshire
- Ambulance: East Midlands
- UK Parliament: South Holland and The Deepings (UK Parliament constituency)

Quadring Eaudike is a hamlet in the South Holland district of Lincolnshire, England. It lies approximately 1 mile (2 km) east from the A152 road, and 2 miles (3 km) south-east from Donington. Quadring Eaudike is within the civil parish of Quadring, a village 1 mile to the west.

The name Quadring, historically Quedhaveringe, is from the Old English meaning "muddy settlement of the family or followers of a man called Haefer".

Quadring Eaudike once contained a chapel, noted by Thomas Allen as not remaining in 1834. The previous chapel of ease was referred to in 1872 at which time a Primitive and a Free Methodist chapel existed.

In 1885 directory occupation listings included ten farmers, two blacksmiths, and the landlord of the New Inn public house. By 1933 there were seven farmers, one of whom was a cottage farmer and another a collector of Crown taxes, six smallholders, a fruit grower, and a beer seller.
