= Westhorpe, Lincolnshire =

Hamlet in Lincolnshire, England

Coordinates: 52.8642°N 0.189956°W

Westhorpe
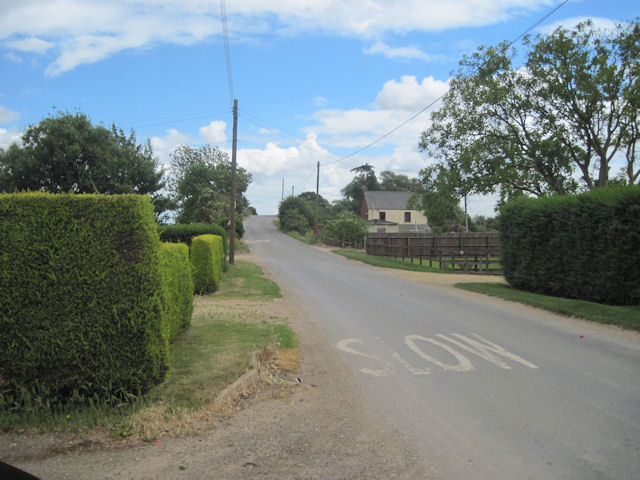
- Westhorpe Road and railway bridge in Westhorpe

- Location within Lincolnshire
- OS grid reference: TF219311
  - London: 95 mi (153 km) S
- District: South Holland
- Shire county: Lincolnshire
- Region: East Midlands
- Country: England
- Sovereign state: United Kingdom
- Post town: SPALDING
- Postcode district: PE11
- Dialling code: 01775
- Police: Lincolnshire
- Fire: Lincolnshire
- Ambulance: East Midlands
- UK Parliament: South Holland and The Deepings

Westhorpe is a hamlet in the civil parish of Gosberton and the South Holland district of Lincolnshire, England. It is 30 miles (50 km) south-east from the city and county town of Lincoln, 6 miles (10 km) north from the nearest large town of Spalding, and 1 mile (1.6 km) west from parish village of Gosberton.

Westhorpe is a linear settlement on the east to west Westhorpe Road. It is centred on the junction of Westhorpe Road with Windmill Lane which runs to the village of Risegate 1,000 yards (900 m) to the south. Adjacent to the east of this junction is a road bridge over the north to south National Rail line from Lincoln to Peterborough. Westthorpe Road, which starts at Gosberton, runs 1500yds to the west from the Windmill Lane junction, where it becomes Swale Bank (road) at the junction with Quadring Bank (road) which runs north.

Today, Westhorpe is a settlement of detached properties including new-build houses and bungalows. There is a creative craft company, a soft furnishings company, and four farms. In 1872 Westhorpe was a hamlet of Gosberton parish. There were twelve farmers, a beerhouse owner, a miller, a grocer & draper, and a "thrashing machine owner".

There are four Grade II listed buildings in Westhorrpe. At the west from the Windmill Lane junction is Yew Tree Farmhouse, which dates to the 16th century. It had a front facade added in the late 17th century, and was altered in the early 19th and the 20th century. The farmhouse is a mixture of two storeys with three bays, and a single storey with attic, and is in red brick laid in Flemish bond with a pantile roof. At the east from the Windmill Lane junction is an early 19th-century two-storey three-bay house of Flemish bond red brick, with sash windows, slate roof and a "lattice porch". Further west is an early 18th-century cottage, with later alterations from the 19th and 20th centuries. It is of three bays with sash windows, and in rendered brick. The pantile roof has gable dormers and attics. Further west is a single storey mid-18th-century cottage with three bays and a corrugated iron roof with dormer windows.

Westhorpe is connected by bus to Quadring and Spalding. The nearest school is Gosberton Academy primary school in Gosberton village.
