= A152 road =

Road in Lincolnshire, England

Coordinates: 52.8766°N 0.1701°W

A152

Major junctions
- North end: Donington
- A52; A16
- South end: Surfleet

Location
- Country: United Kingdom
- Constituent country: England

Road network
- Roads in the United Kingdom; Motorways; A and B road zones

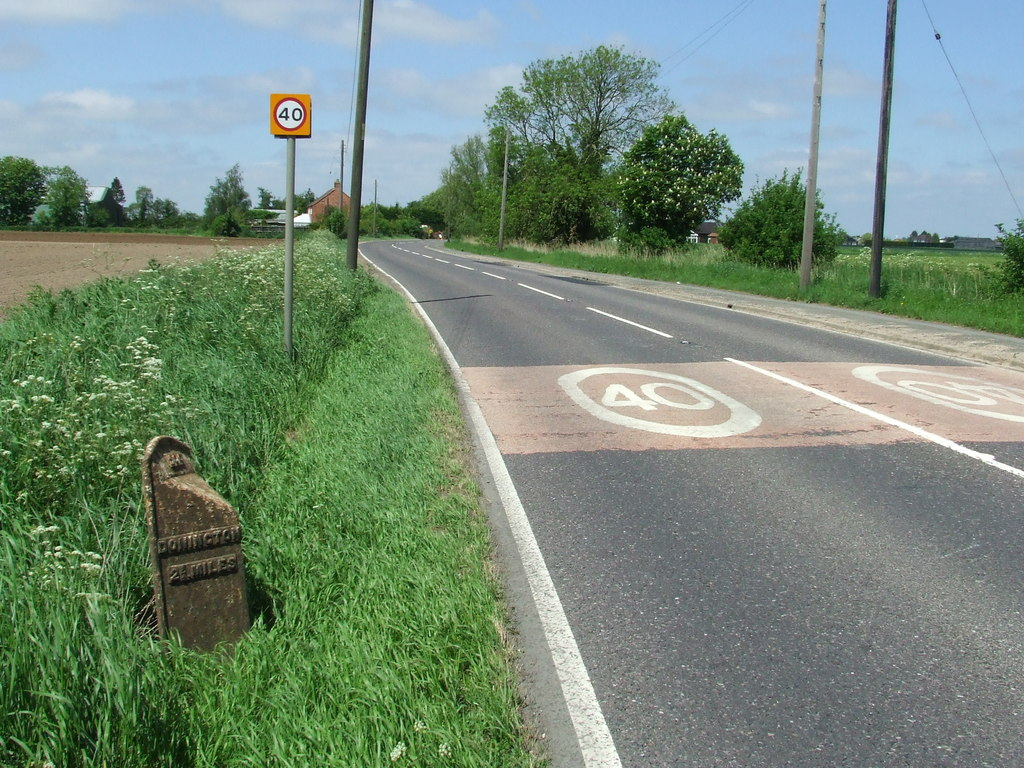
A152 at Monks Hall, showing speed limit and 19th century milepost

The A152 is a small non-primary A-road in Lincolnshire, from Donington to Surfleet linking the A52 and the A16, two major primary routes.

Between Donington and Surfleet the road goes through three villages; Church End, Quadring, and Gosberton.

To eliminate the number of speeding motorists who use the road for an easy way to get to and from Spalding, there is a speed limit of 40 miles per hour (64 km/h), higher in some places, this is so that traffic flows easier than a 30 miles per hour (48 km/h) speed limit would allow.
