= Quadring Fen =

Hamlet in the South Holland district of Lincolnshire, England

Coordinates: 52.876122°N 0.238520°W

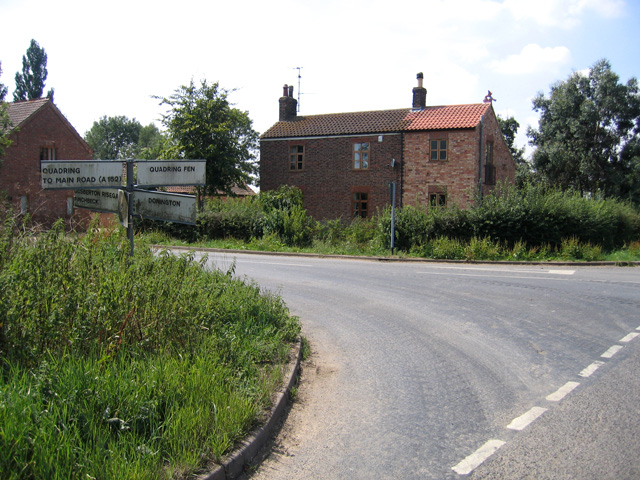
- Junction south of Quadring Fen

- Location within Lincolnshire
- OS grid reference: TF186324
  - London: 95 mi (153 km) S
- District: South Holland, Lincolnshire
- Shire county: Lincolnshire
- Region: East Midlands
- Country: England
- Sovereign state: United Kingdom
- Post town: Spalding
- Postcode district: PE11
- Dialling code: 01775
- Police: Lincolnshire
- Fire: Lincolnshire
- Ambulance: East Midlands
- UK Parliament: South Holland and The Deepings (UK Parliament constituency)

Quadring Fen is a hamlet in the South Holland district of Lincolnshire, England. It is situated 2 miles (3.2 km) south from the A52 road, 5 miles (8.0 km) east of Billingborough and about 7 miles (11 km) north-west from Spalding.

The village of Quadring is 2.5 miles (4.0 km) to the east. The smaller settlement of Quadring High Fen is 0.5 miles (0.8 km) to the south.

Quadring Fen forms part of the Lincolnshire Fens which was an area of low-lying land prone to flooding prior to drainage works being carried out between 1635 and 1638.

== Demographics ==
At the time of the 2011 census the civil parish had a population of 256.

This breaks down into:

132 Male

124 Female

253 White, 3 Mixed ethnicity

== Commerce and amenities ==
There used to be a public house in the village called The Old Plough Inn on the corner of South Drove and Quadring Bank. The publican in 1919 was George Hempsall, and it was owned by the Soulby, Son & Winch brewery until 1951 when it was purchased by JW Green of Luton. It was closed for business on 14 May 1962 and subsequently converted for residential use.

The South Forty Foot drain runs through Quadring Fen and there is a pump house situated at the end of South Drove. The Forty foot drain is a pump assisted principal drainage channel for the Fens of Eastern England that was first cut in the 17th century.
