= Gosberton =

Village and civil parish in Lincolnshire, England

Coordinates: 52.85°N 0.15°W

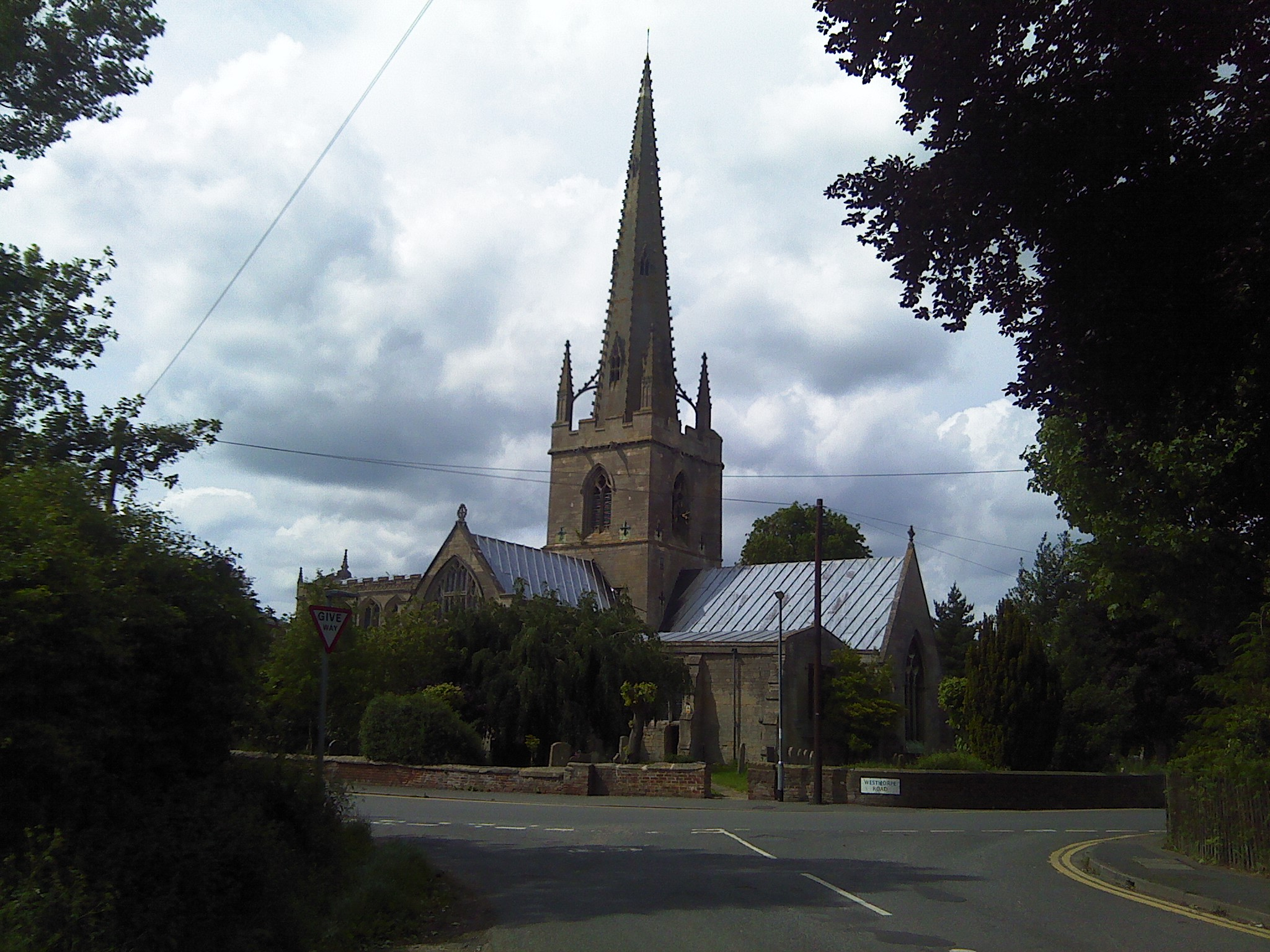
- Church of St Peter and St Paul, Gosberton

- Location within Lincolnshire
- Population: 2,958
- OS grid reference: TF241313
  - London: 95 mi (153 km) S
- District: South Holland
- Shire county: Lincolnshire
- Region: East Midlands
- Country: England
- Sovereign state: United Kingdom
- Post town: SPALDING
- Postcode district: PE11
- Dialling code: 01775
- Police: Lincolnshire
- Fire: Lincolnshire
- Ambulance: East Midlands
- UK Parliament: South Holland and The Deepings

Gosberton is a village and civil parish in the South Holland district of Lincolnshire, England. It is situated 9 miles (14.5 km) south-west of Boston, 6 miles (10 km) north of Spalding and 9 miles (14 km) north-west of Holbeach. The parish includes the villages and hamlets of Gosberton Clough and Risegate, Westhorpe and Gosberton Cheal. The population of Gosberton, which was approximately 2,500, increased to 2,958 at the 2011 Census.

The place-name 'Gosberton' is first attested in the Domesday Book of 1086, where it appears as Gosebertechirche and Gozeberdechercha. The name meant 'Gosbeorht's church', which was later changed to Gosberton, meaning 'Gosbeorht's town or settlement'. Eilert Ekwall comments, "Gosbeorht is probably a Continental name (Old High German Gauzpert, Gosbert from Gautberht)."

The village was skirted by the A16 road but has been bypassed. The crossroads of the B1397 (Dowsby to Boston road) and the A152 (Donington to Surfleet road) which is known to the elder locals as “Snowhill” is located here. The Peterborough to Lincoln railway line crosses the B1397, at a level crossing in Risegate, and passes through the hamlet of Westhorpe further north. When this line was known as the Great Northern and Great Eastern Joint Railway, it had a railway station.

The parish church of Gosberton is dedicated to St Peter and St Paul, and is under the Diocese of Lincoln. Gosberton Clough's wooden church is dedicated to St Gilbert and St Hugh. These two churches and that at Quadring are in the same Group, based in Gosberton.

The Baptist Church in Gosberton was founded in 1666. At the time, non-conformist Christians had no protection from the law and, like John Bunyan, could be imprisoned for their faith. Worship takes place in the original 17th-century meeting house.

The main occupation in the parish is farming. Some residents commute to jobs in surrounding areas and the larger towns of Spalding and Boston.

Gosberton House Academy is a school for children with additional educational needs.

Public houses within the parish are The Black Horse Inn, The Duke of York and The Five Bells Inn in Risegate, and the Bell Inn in Gosberton village.

Just to the east of the village is a nature reserve administered by the Lincolnshire Wildlife Trust.

== Gallery ==
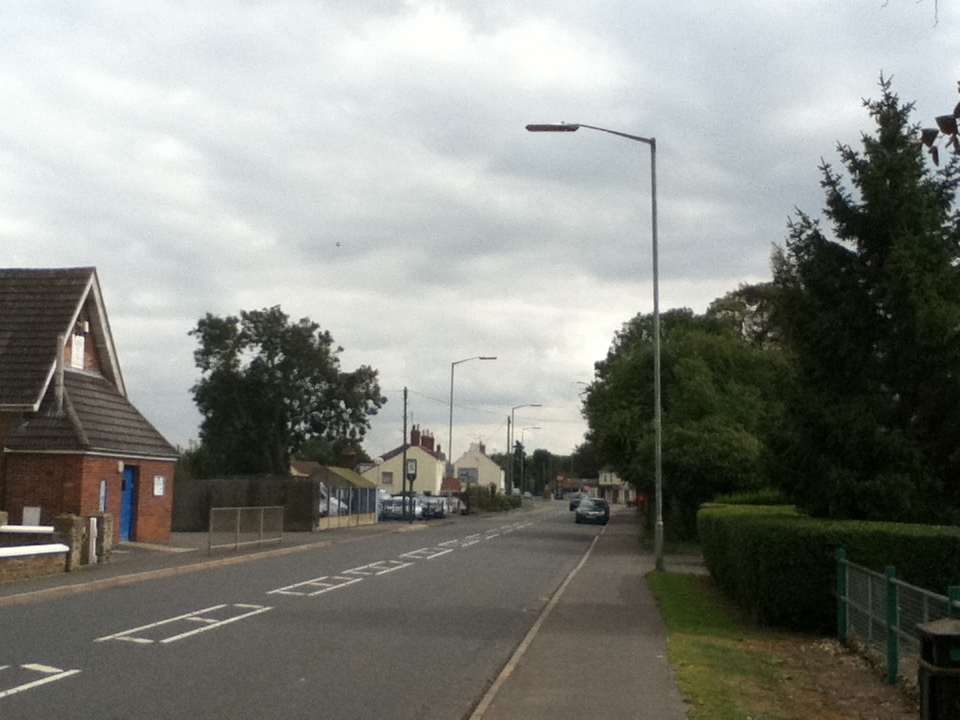

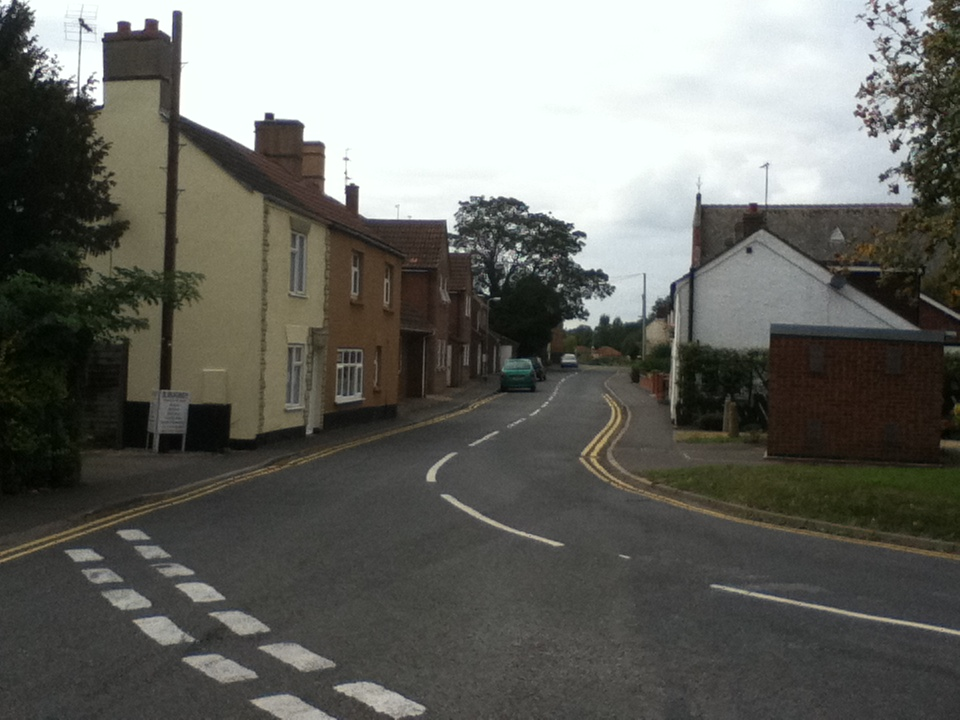

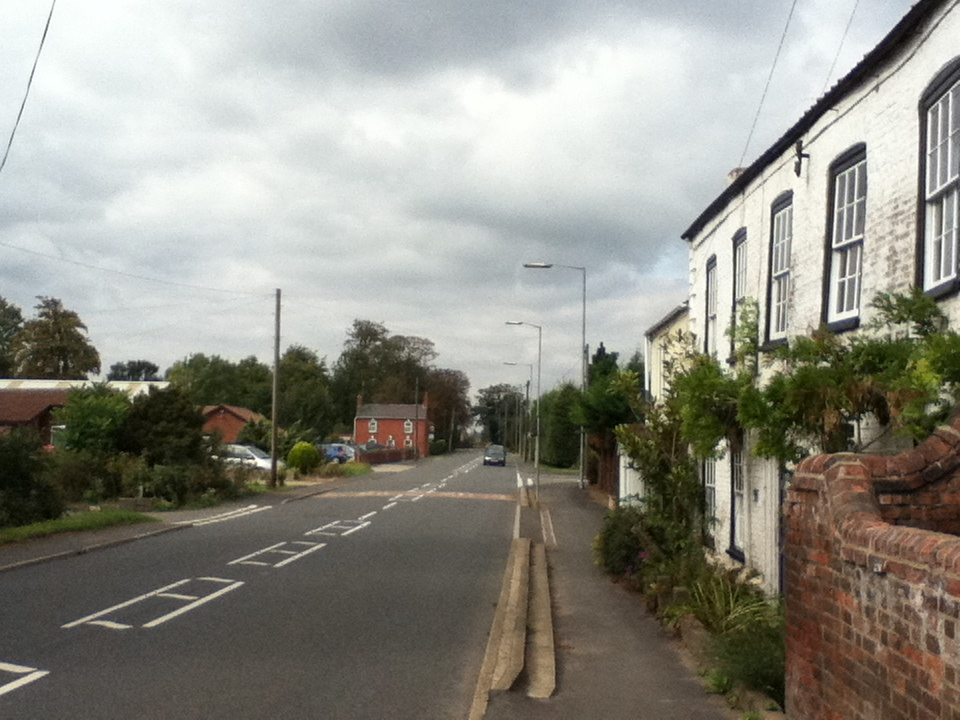

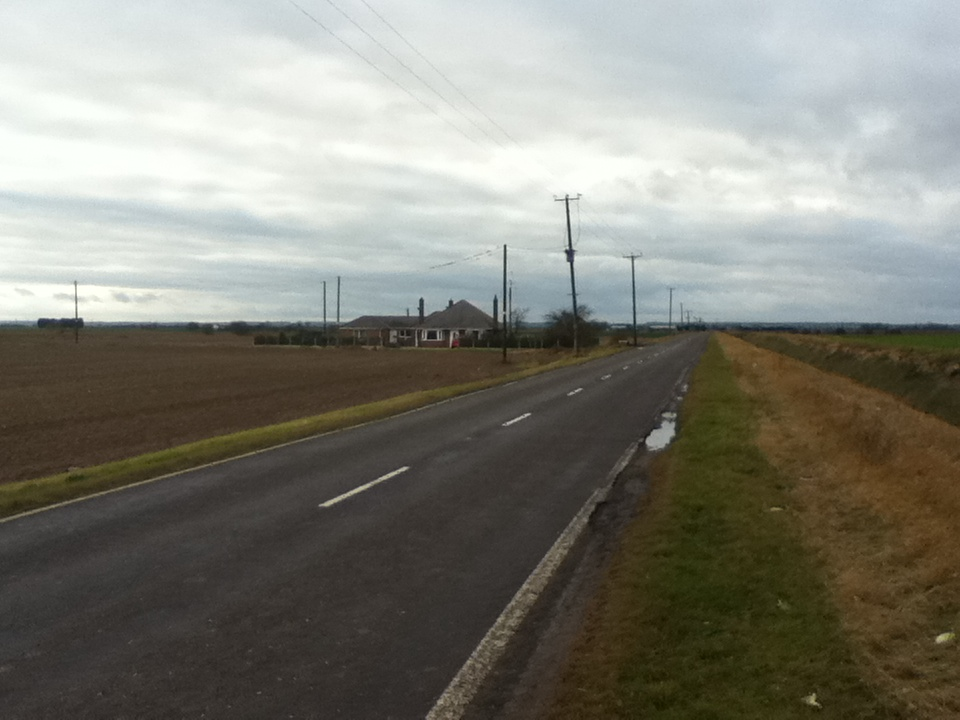

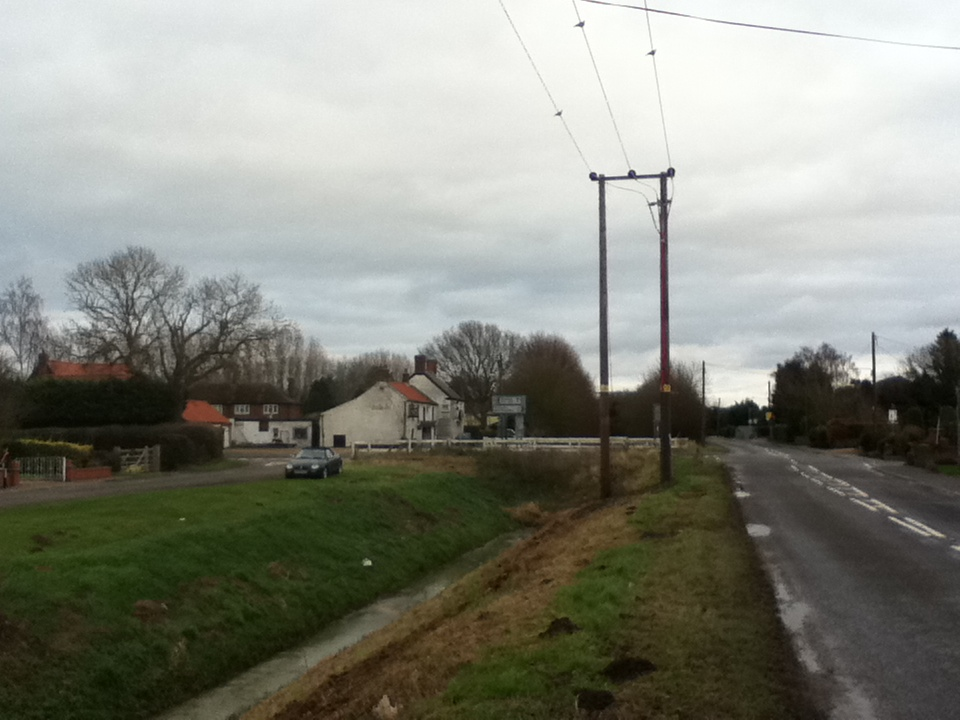

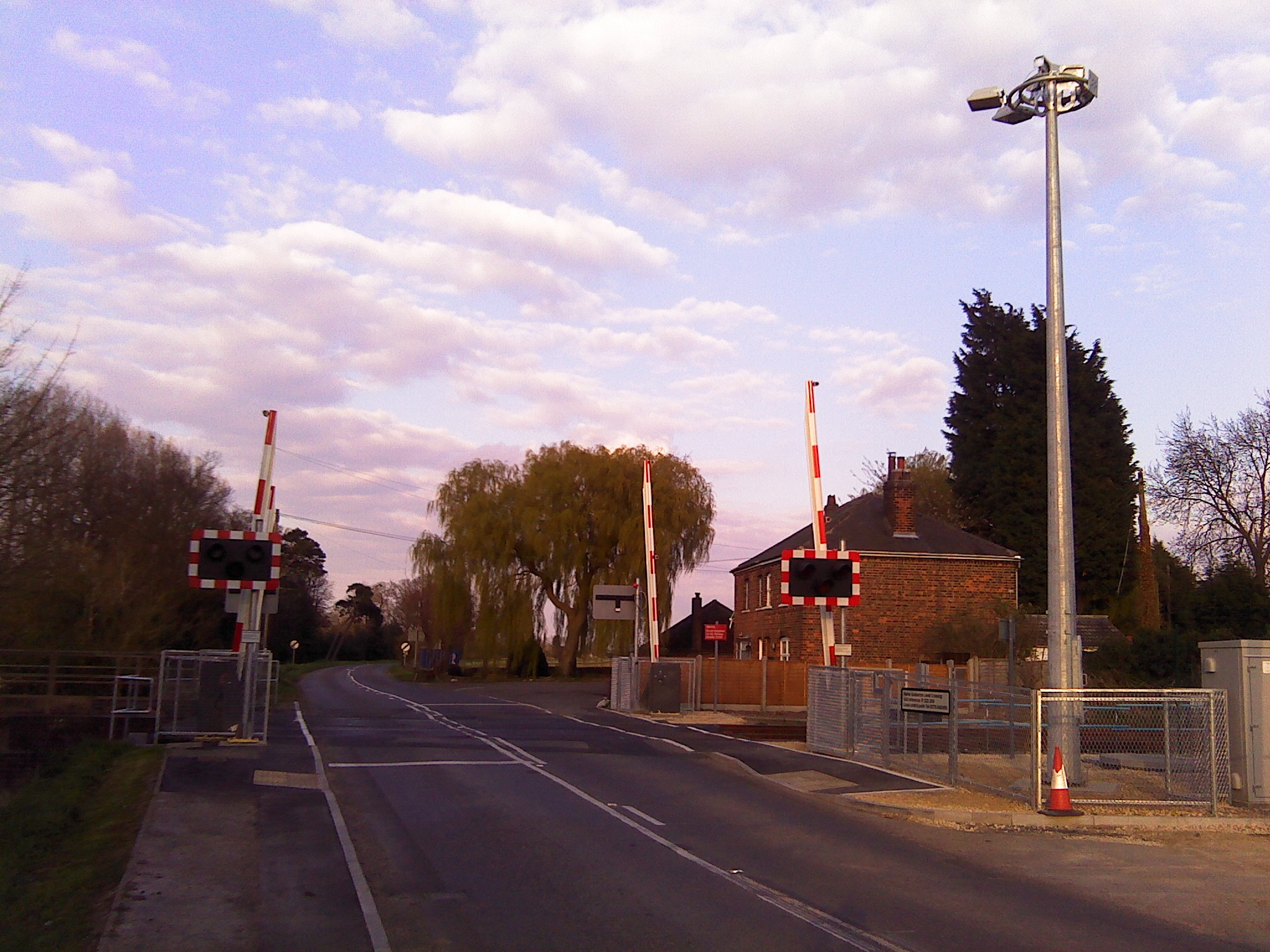

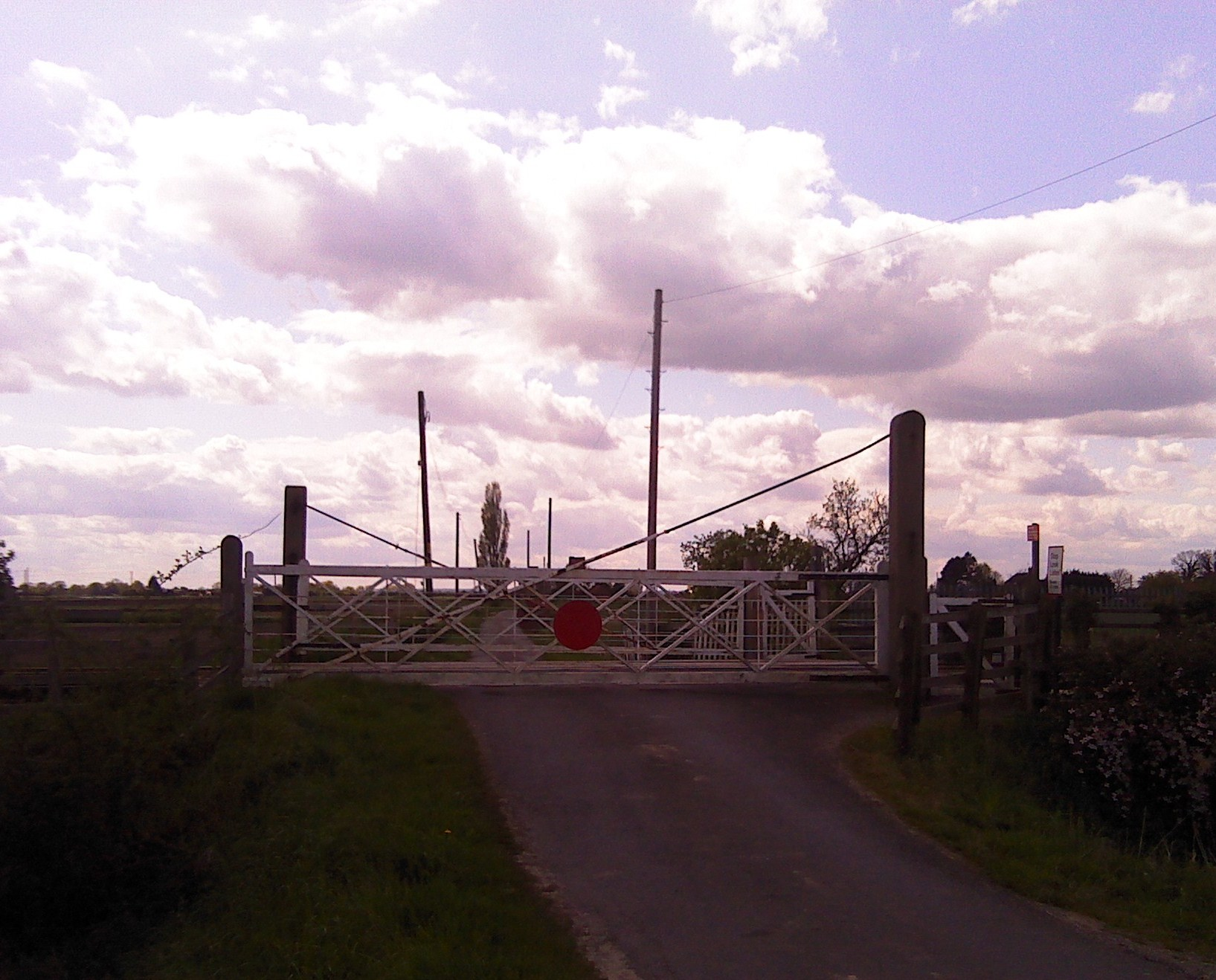

== Notable people from Gosberton ==
- Abbi Pulling (born 2003), racing driver
