= Quoditch =

Hamlet in Devon, England

Coordinates: 50.750000°N 4.266666°W

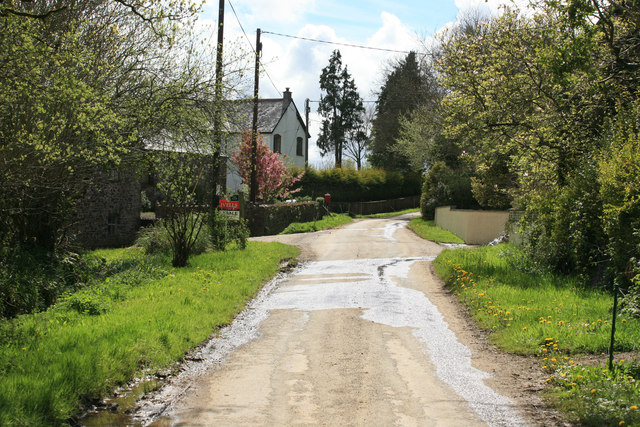
- Quoditch

- Location within Devon
- OS grid reference: SX4019696939
- District: Torridge
- Shire county: Devon
- Region: South West
- Country: England
- Sovereign state: United Kingdom
- Post town: BEAWORTHY
- Postcode district: EX21
- Dialling code: 01409
- Police: Devon and Cornwall
- Fire: Devon and Somerset
- Ambulance: South Western
- UK Parliament: Torridge and West Devon

Quoditch is a hamlet in the parish of Ashwater, part of the Torridge district of Devon, England. Its nearest town is Holsworthy, which lies approximately 5.6 miles (9 km) north-west from the hamlet.
