= Quality Corner =

Hamlet in Cumbria, England

Coordinates: 54°33′47″N 3°34′00″W

- Location in Copeland Borough Location within Cumbria
- OS grid reference: NX987196
- Civil parish: Moresby
- Unitary authority: Cumberland
- Ceremonial county: Cumbria
- Region: North West
- Country: England
- Sovereign state: United Kingdom
- Post town: WHITEHAVEN
- Postcode district: CA28
- Dialling code: 01946
- Police: Cumbria
- Fire: Cumbria
- Ambulance: North West
- UK Parliament: Whitehaven and Workington

Quality Corner is a hamlet in the English county of Cumbria.

Quality Corner is located about one mile east of the port of Whitehaven; its postal address being Quality Corner, Moresby, Cumbria.
