= Donington, Lincolnshire =

Village in Lincolnshire, England

Coordinates: 52.904035°N 0.198246°W

Donington
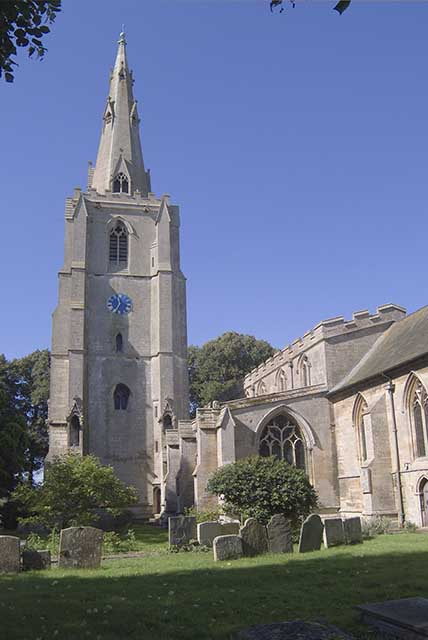
- Church of St Mary and the Holy Rood, Donington

- Location within Lincolnshire
- Population: 3,196 (2021 census)
- OS grid reference: TF212355
  - London: 100 S
- Civil parish: Donington
- District: South Holland
- Shire county: Lincolnshire
- Region: East Midlands
- Country: England
- Sovereign state: United Kingdom
- Post town: Spalding
- Postcode district: PE11
- Dialling code: 01775
- Police: Lincolnshire
- Fire: Lincolnshire
- Ambulance: East Midlands
- UK Parliament: South Holland and The Deepings

Donington is a village and civil parish in the South Holland District of Lincolnshire, England. It is 8 miles (13 km) north from the market town of Spalding and 11 miles (18 km) south of Boston on the A152, it is bypassed by the A52, and sits close to the A16 and A17. The parish includes the hamlet of Northorpe, and falls within the drainage area of the Black Sluice Internal Drainage Board. Donington is the birthplace of the explorer Matthew Flinders and where he was reburied in 2024.

== History ==
In Roman times, a road connected Wainfleet from the east coast through the settlement to Grantham. The road, Salters Way, was to carry salt from The Wash to the Midlands. In the Domesday Book (1086) the settlement which then was called Donnicture was a small hamlet with a Lord of the Manor and 16 salt works worth 20/-. It then had a recorded population of 65 households in the hundred of Kirton.

Donington was large enough in the 18th century to attract the travelling theatrical companies. In 1784, a surgeon, Matthew Flinders, father of the famous navigator, wrote "in the latter half of October and beginning of November we have a small Company of Comedians with us. I went 3 or 4 times and once or twice was tolerably entertained".

== Governance ==
As well as having its own parish council, Donington is part of the electoral ward of Donington, Quadring and Gosberton within the South Holland district of Lincolnshire. The total population of the ward taken at the 2021 census was 3,196.

It also forms part of the Donington Rural electoral division of Lincolnshire County Council.

== Parish church ==
Donington's Church of England parish church is dedicated to St Mary and the Holy Rood. It is a Grade I listed building. The church is almost a complete combination of early Decorated and late Perpendicular style. Its chancel, however, is mainly Early English. The church tower and spire rise to 240 feet (73 m).

Matthew Flinders' remains were identified in London in January 2019. Permission was granted for him to be re-buried in the north aisle of the Church of St Mary and the Holy Rood where he was baptised. His remains were reburied on 13 July 2024.

== Geography ==
The contract for the A52 bypass was £1.8m in April 1988. Work began in October 1988, with a 45 week contract, to open in September 1989. The bypass opened three months early in May 1989, built by Lincolnshire county council. In December 2024 it was agreed by Lincolnshire County Council’s planning and regulation committee that the speed limit of section of the A52 at the top of Donington will be reduced from 60 mph (97 km/h) to 50 mph (80 km/h) following expressed concerns from residents and reports of several accidents.

== Community ==
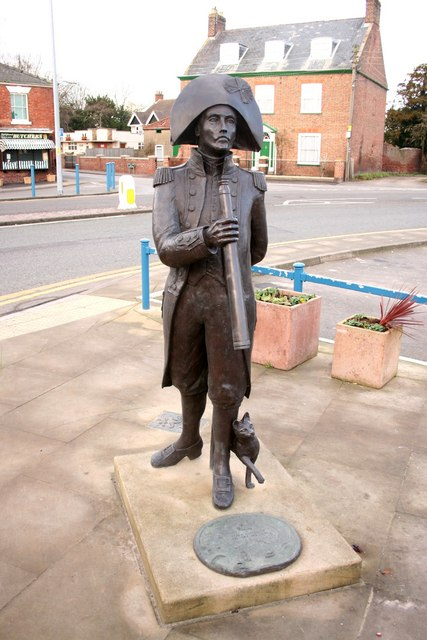
Statue of Matthew Flinders (and Trim the cat)

Local amenities include a park, a playpark, and a teen skatepark. Donington businesses include The Black Bull public house, Coop and Premier stores in the Market Place, an independent opticians, a butchers, a hair stylist, a flower shop, and a pets & produce outlet. A timber windows manufacturer, employing approximately 100 people, is one of the main employers, while a fire prevention and security company has its head office in Donington.

== Schools ==
There are two schools: the Donington Cowley Endowed Primary School, and Cowley Academy, a non-selective secondary school for pupils aged 11 to 16, and partly Grade II listed.

== Travel ==
The nearest Railway Stations are in Spalding and Boston with regular services to Peterborough, Lincoln, Derby, Sheffield, Leicester, Nottingham and London. The village is on an operating passenger rail line but has no station. In 2008 Hull Trains proposed reopening it as a railhead to nearby Boston for a direct Lincoln to London service.

Donington is on the regular B9 Bus route between Boston and Spalding

== Sport ==
Donington has football teams for two age groups: Old Doningtonians for over eighteens, and Young Dons (established in 1996) for anyone under that age; Old Dons play in the Saturday Boston League and Young Dons on a Sunday in the Mid-Lincolnshire Junior League.

The nearest professional football club is Boston United located approximately 11 miles from Donington in Boston itself. Boston play in the National League and fifth-highest tier overall in the English football league system
