= Quadring =

Village in Lincolnshire, England

Coordinates: 52.881105°N 0.180445°W

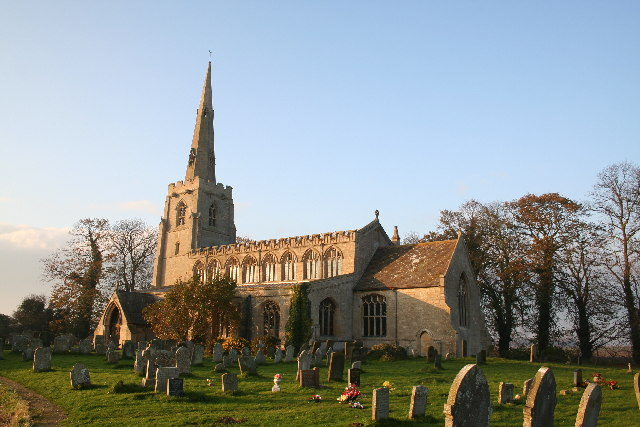
- St Margaret's Church, Quadring

- Location within Lincolnshire
- Population: 1,339 (2011)
- OS grid reference: TF225330
  - London: 95 mi (153 km) S
- District: South Holland, Lincolnshire
- Shire county: Lincolnshire
- Region: East Midlands
- Country: England
- Sovereign state: United Kingdom
- Post town: Spalding
- Postcode district: PE11
- Dialling code: 01775
- Police: Lincolnshire
- Fire: Lincolnshire
- Ambulance: East Midlands
- UK Parliament: South Holland and The Deepings (UK Parliament constituency)

Quadring is a small village and civil parish in the South Holland district of Lincolnshire. It lies on the A152, 2 miles (3.2 km) north-east of Gosberton, and 2 miles south-east of Donington.

The village includes the community of Barholme to its south-west. To the east of Quadring is Quadring Eaudike, and to the west is Quadring Fen. Nearby to the west is the Peterborough to Lincoln Line. The A152 (as Main Road within the village) transects Quadring and provides links to Spalding, Boston, Donington and Gosberton.

The village name is derived from the Old English "cwead+haefer+ingas" (Muddy settlement of Haefer), and is recorded in the Domesday Book of 1086 as Quadheveringe and Quedhaveringe.

The Grade I listed village church, dedicated to St Margaret of Antioch, lies at Church End, north of, and separate from, the village. Mainly an example of Perpendicular architecture, it was rebuilt in 1872.

Other listed buildings include a Grade II cottage, house, granary, coaching house, farm, and farm house.

== Amenities ==
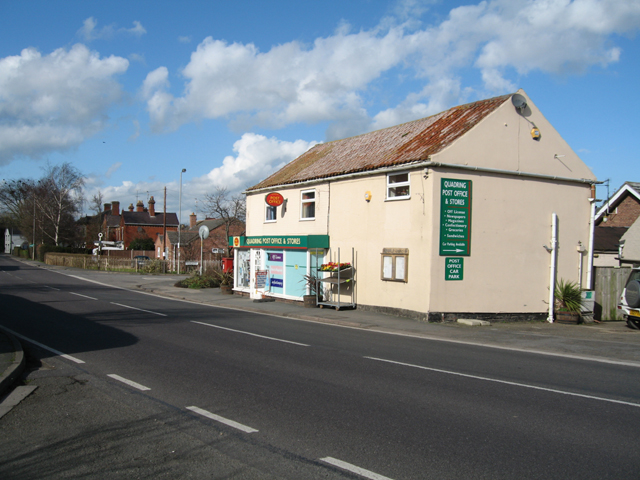
Village store and post office

The local school is the Quadring Cowley and Brown's primary school.

Previously Quadring had three public houses, a butcher, fishmonger, blacksmith, a slaughterhouse, and several pig farms. One of the public houses, The Black Bull was to the left of the Post Office; another, almost opposite the Post Office, was The Red Cow, which closed in 2002 and is now an Indian restaurant. Remaining is a village store (that serves as a post office), and The White Hart public house on Town Drove.
