= List of churches in Lincolnshire =

This is a list of churches in Lincolnshire. divided by denomination.

== Church of England ==
The Diocese of Lincoln is responsible for Anglican churches in Lincolnshire. It is divided into the Archdeaconries of:

- Lincoln:
  - Bolingbroke
  - Calcewaithe and Candleshoe
  - Christianity
  - Graffoe
  - Horncastle
  - Lafford
  - Louthesk
- Stow and Lindsey
  (separate until 1994):
  - Isle of Axholme
  - Corringham
  - Grimsby and Cleethorpes
  - Haverstoe
  - Lawres
  - Manlake
  - West Wold
  - Yarborough
- Boston:
  - (Aveland and Ness with) Stamford
  - Beltisloe
  - Elloe East
  - Elloe West
  - Grantham
  - Holland
  - Loveden

List
Image	Name	Civil Parish	Local government district	Date/Era	Conservation listing	Coordinates	Notes
	All Saints' Church	Lincoln	Lincoln	1904	Grade II	SK 98520 71406	
N/A	St Mary's Church (lost)	Aby with Greenfield	East Lindsey	Lost church	N/A		
	St Nicholas's Church	Addlethorpe	East Lindsey	15th Century	Grade I		
	St Peter's Church	Aisthorpe	West Lindsey		Grade II		
	St Wilfrid's Church	Alford	East Lindsey		Grade I		
	St John's Church	Alkborough	North Lincolnshire				
	Holy Trinity Church	Allington	South Kesteven	c. 1150	Grade II*		
	St Adelwold's Church	Alvingham	East Lindsey	14th Century	Grade I		Immediately adjacent to St Mary's Church in the same parish, but for the parish of South Cockerington.
	St Mary's Church (redundant)	Alvingham	East Lindsey	11th Century	Grade I		Parish church for the neighbouring South Cockerington. Under the care of the Churches Conservation Trust. Once a chapel of Alvingham Priory.
	Alvingham Priory	Alvingham	East Lindsey	1148			Dissolved 1538. The church of St Mary was originally a chapel as part of the priory, though it also pre-dates the founding of the priory.
	St Mark's Church	Amcotts	North Lincolnshire	1853	Grade II	SE 85528 14125	
N/A	St Thomas A Becket's Church (lost)	Amcotts	North Lincolnshire		N/A		Fell down in 1849.
	St Martin's Church	Ancaster	South Kesteven	11th Century	Grade I	SK 98270 43573	
	St Andrew's Church	Anderby	East Lindsey	1759	Grade II		
	St Edith's Church	Anwick	North Kesteven	13th Century	Grade I	TF 11451 50634	
	St Andrew's Church	Apley	West Lindsey	1871	N/A	TF 10895 75101	
N/A	St Andrew's Church (lost)	Apley	West Lindsey		N/A		Lost by 1816
	St Bartholomew's Church	Appleby	North Lincolnshire	13th Century	Grade II*	SE 95312 15066	
	St Andrew's Church	Asgarby and Howell (Asgarby)	North Kesteven	13th Century	Grade I	TF 11627 45389	
		Asgarby and Howell	North Kesteven				
		Ashby cum Fenby	North East Lincolnshire				
		Ashby de la Launde and Bloxholm	North Kesteven				
		Ashby Parkland	North Lincolnshire				
	St Peter's and St Paul's Church	Ashby with Scremby	East Lindsey	1733	Grade II*		
	St Helen's Church	Ashby with Scremby	East Lindsey	1841	Grade II		
	St James's Church	Aslackby and Laughton (Aslackby)	South Kesteven	14th Century	Grade I		
	St Peter's Church (redundant)	Asterby	East Lindsey	14th Century	Grade II*		Now in private ownership.
	St Denys' Church	Aswarby and Swarby (Aswarby)	North Kesteven	12th Century	Grade I		
	St Mary's and All Saints' Church	Aswarby and Swarby (Swarby)	North Kesteven	13th Century	Grade II*		
	St Helen's Church	Aswardby	East Lindsey	1747	Grade II		
	St Peter's Church (Old Church)	Aubourn with Haddington (Aubourn)	North Kesteven	1862	Grade II	SK 91960 62518	Largely demolished in 1973. Known locally as the Clock Tower.
	St Peter's Church	Aubourn with Haddington (Aubourn)	North Kesteven	13th Century	Grade II*	SK 92767 62787	
		Aunsby and Dembleby	North Kesteven				
	St Margaret's Church (lost)	Authorpe	East Lindsey	15th Century	Grade II		Restored 1848. Declared redundant 1980, demolished 1982.
	St Lawrence's Church	Aylesby	North East Lincolnshire	13th Century	Grade I	TA 20289 07589	
	St Lawrence's Church	Bardney	West Lindsey	1434	Grade I	TF11936 69366	
		Barholm and Stowe	South Kesteven				
	St Nicholas	Barkston	South Kesteven				
		Barlings	West Lindsey				
		Barnetby le Wold	North Lincolnshire				
		Barnoldby le Beck	North East Lincolnshire				
		Barrow upon Humber	North Lincolnshire				
	All Saints Church	Barrowby	South Kesteven	14th Century	Grade I	SK 87864 36492	
	St Peter's Church	Barton-upon-Humber	North Lincolnshire	Saxon	Grade I		
		Bassingham	North Kesteven				
		Baston	South Kesteven				
	St Swithin's Church	Baumber	East Lindsey	11th Century	Grade I		Encased in brick in 1758.
	All Saints' Church	Beckingham	North Kesteven	12th Century	Grade I		
	St Andrew's Church	Beelsby	North East Lincolnshire	13th Century	Grade II		
	St Andrew's Church	Beesby with Saleby (Beesby)	East Lindsey	13th Century	Grade II*		
	St Margaret's Church	Beesby with Saleby (Saleby)	East Lindsey		Grade II		Rebuilt 1850
	St Peter's and St Paul's Church	Belchford	East Lindsey	before 1153, rebuilt 1781	Grade II		
	St John's Church	Belleau	East Lindsey	13th Century	Grade II*		
	St Peter and St Paul	Belton	North Lincolnshire				
		Belton and Manthorpe	South Kesteven				
	St Julian's Church	Benniworth	East Lindsey	12th Century	Grade II		
		Bigby	West Lindsey				
	St Andrew's Church	Billingborough	South Kesteven	1251 or 1312	Grade I		
		Billinghay	North Kesteven				
	Holy Trinity Church	Bilsby	East Lindsey	15th Century	Grade II*		
	St Mary's and St Gabriel's Church	Binbrook	East Lindsey	1869	Grade II		Built by James Fowler. Replaced the two lost churches of St Mary's and St Gabriel's.
N/A	St Mary's Church (lost)	Binbrook	East Lindsey		N/A		
N/A	St Gabriel's Church (lost)	Binbrook	East Lindsey		N/A		
		Bishop Norton	West Lindsey				
		Bitchfield and Bassingthorpe	South Kesteven				
		Blankney	North Kesteven				
		Blyborough	West Lindsey				
	St Martin	Blyton	West Lindsey				
	St Peter's and St Paul's Church	Bolingbroke	East Lindsey				
		Bonby	North Lincolnshire				
		Boothby Graffoe	North Kesteven				
		Boothby Pagnell	South Kesteven				
	Boston Stump	Boston	Borough of Boston				
		Bottesford	North Lincolnshire				
	Bourne Abbey	Bourne	South Kesteven		Grade I		
		Braceborough and Wilsthorpe	South Kesteven				
	St John's Church	Bracebridge Heath	North Kesteven				
		Braceby and Sapperton	South Kesteven				
	St Edith's Church	Brackenborough with Little Grimsby	East Lindsey	15th Century	Grade II		
	St George's Church	Bradley	North East Lincolnshire	13th Century	Grade II*	TA 24171 06765	
		Brampton	West Lindsey				
		Branston and Mere	North Kesteven				
	St Helen's Church	Brant Broughton and Stragglethorpe	North Kesteven				
	St Peter and St Paul's Church	Bratoft	East Lindsey	Early 14th Century	Grade II*		
	St Cuthbert's Church	Brattleby	West Lindsey	11th Century	Grade II*	SK 94738 80800	
		Brigg	North Lincolnshire				
	St Helen's Church	Brigsley	North East Lincolnshire	11th Century	Grade II*	TA 25467 01813	
	St Philip's Church	Brinkhill	East Lindsey	1857	Grade II		
	Broadholme Priory	Broadholme	West Lindsey	Before 1154	Scheduled Ancient Monument		Historically part or Nottinghamshire. Dissolved 1536. Site is now Manor Farm.
	All Saint's Church	Brocklesby	West Lindsey	14th Century	Grade I		
	Newsham Abbey	Brocklesby	West Lindsey	1143			Dissolved 1536. Founded by Peter of Gousla, daughter house to Abbey of Licques. First Premonstratensian house in England.
	St Michael's Church (defunct)	Brookenby	West Lindsey	Modern	None		Served RAF Binbrook
	St Mary's Church	Broughton	North Lincolnshire	11th Century	Grade I		
	All Saint's Church	Broxholme	West Lindsey		Grade II		Rebuilt in 1857 by T.C. Hine
	St Margaret's Church	Bucknall	East Lindsey	13th Century	Grade II*		
	Bullington Priory (lost)	Bullington	West Lindsey	1148	Scheduled Ancient Monument		
	St Peter and St Paul's Church	Burgh le Marsh	East Lindsey	c. 1500	Grade I		
	St Helen's Church	Burgh on Bain	East Lindsey		Grade II		
	St John's Church	Burringham	North Lincolnshire	1856	Grade II		
	St Vincent's Church	Burton	West Lindsey	12th Century	Grade II	SK 96171 74590	
	St Thomas a Becket's Church	Burton Coggles	South Kesteven	12th Century	Grade I	SK 97969 25839	
	St Andrew's Church	Burton Pedwardine	North Kesteven	11th Century	Grade II	TF 11935 42097	
	St Andrew's Church	Burton upon Stather	North Lincolnshire	12th Century	Grade I	SE 87016 17875	
	St Michael's Church	Burwell	East Lindsey	12th Century	Grade I		Managed by the Churches Conservation Trust.
N/A	Burwell Priory	Burwell	East Lindsey	Norman	N/A		Benedictine Priory
	St Michael's Church	Buslingthorpe	West Lindsey	13th Century	Grade II*	TF07945 85160	Declared redundant in 1984. In the care of the Churches Conservation Trust.
	St Nicholas' Church	Cabourne	West Lindsey	11th Century	Grade II*	TA13979 01912	
	All Saints' Church	Cadney	North Lincolnshire	12th Church	Grade I	TA 01695 03354	
	St Nicholas' Church	Caenby	West Lindsey		Grade II	TF 00003 89292	
	St Peter and St Paul's Church	Caistor	West Lindsey	11th Century	Grade I	TA11677 01275	
	St Faith's Church (lost)	Calcethorpe with Kelstern (Calcethorpe)	East Lindsey		N/A		Lost by 1450
	St Faith's Church	Calcethorpe with Kelstern (Kelstern)	East Lindsey	14th Century	Grade II*		
	St Michael's and All Angels' Church	Cammeringham	West Lindsey	c. 1175	Grade II*		
N/A	Cammeringham Priory (lost)	Cammeringham	West Lindsey				Cammeringham Manor is now on the site with the cellars of the priory below.
	St Benedict's Church	Candlesby with Gunby (Candlesby)	East Lindsey		Grade II		Rebuilt in 1838.
	St Peter's Church	Candlesby with Gunby (Gunby)	East Lindsey		Grade II*		Rebuilt in 1870.
	All Saints' Church	Canwick	North Kesteven	12th Century	Grade I	SK 98745 69700	
		Careby Aunby and Holywell	South Kesteven				
		Carlby	South Kesteven				
		Carlton Scroop	South Kesteven				
	St Mary's Church	Carlton-le-Moorland	North Kesteven	11th Century	Grade I	SK 90809 57895	
	St Paul's Church	Carrington	East Lindsey	1816	Grade II		
		Castle Bytham	South Kesteven				
		Caythorpe	South Kesteven				
		Chapel St Leonards	East Lindsey				
		Cherry Willingham	West Lindsey				
		Claxby	West Lindsey				
	St Andrew's Church (redundant)	Claxby St Andrew	East Lindsey		Grade II		Rebuilt in 1846.
	All Saint's Church (lost)	Claxby with Moorby (Moorby)	East Lindsey	Early English	N/A		Demolished in the 1980s.
	St Andrew's Church	Claxby with Moorby (Claxby Pluckacre)	East Lindsey		N/A		Fell down in 1748.
	St Peter's Church	Claypole	South Kesteven	13th Century	Grade I	SK 84552 48996	
		Claythorpe	East Lindsey				
		Cold Hanworth	West Lindsey				
		Coleby	North Kesteven				
	St John's Church	Colsterworth	South Kesteven	11th Century	Grade I		
	St Michael's Church	Coningsby	East Lindsey	13th Century	Grade I	TF 22233 58040	
		Conisholme	East Lindsey				
		Corby Glen	South Kesteven				
		Corringham	West Lindsey				
		Counthorpe and Creeton	South Kesteven				
		Covenham St Bartholomew	East Lindsey				
		Covenham St Mary	East Lindsey				
		Cowbit	South Holland				
		Cranwell, Brauncewell and Byard's Leap	North Kesteven				
	All Saints' Church	Croft	East Lindsey	14th Century	Grade I	TF 50926 61864	
	Crowland Abbey	Crowland	South Holland	8th Century (?)	Grade I		
		Crowle and Ealand	North Lincolnshire				
		Croxton	North Lincolnshire				
N/A	St Bartholomew's Church (lost)	Culverthorpe and Kelby (Culverthorpe)	North Kesteven	N/A	N/A	TF 02320 40459	Lost before 1872.
	St Andrew's Church	Culverthorpe and Kelby (Kelby)	North Kesteven	12th Century	Grade I	TF 00359 41424	Rebuilt in 1881 after a collapse.
	St Helen's Church (redundant)	Cumberworth	East Lindsey	13th Century	Grade II	TF 50628 73743	Declared redundant in 1987, now in private ownership.
	St Lawrence's Church	Dalby (Dalby)	East Lindsey	1862	Grade II	TF40943 70081	
	(lost)	Dalby (Dalby)	East Lindsey				Material used for the construction of the present church.
	(lost)	Dalby (Dexthorpe)	East Lindsey				
	St James's Church (Priory Church)	Deeping St James	South Kesteven	1139	Grade I	TF 15751 09592	Built out of the remains of Deeping St James Priory.
		Deeping St Nicholas	South Holland				
		Denton	South Kesteven				
	St Thomas's Church	Digby	North Kesteven		Grade I		
		Doddington and Whisby	North Kesteven				
		Dogdyke	North Kesteven				
	St Mary's Church	Donington	South Holland	13th Century	Grade I	TF 20824 35943	
	St Andrew's Church	Donington on Bain	East Lindsey	12th Century	Grade II*		Restored in 1868.
	St James' and St John's Church	Dorrington	North Kesteven	13th Century	Grade I	TF 07621 53375	
	St Andrew's Church	Dowsby	South Kesteven	11th Century	Grade II*	TF 11328 29276	
		Dunholme	West Lindsey				
		Dunsby	South Kesteven				
		Dunston	North Kesteven				
		Eagle and Swinethorpe	North Kesteven				
	St Mary's Church	East Barkwith	East Lindsey	12th Century	Grade II*		
		East Butterwick	North Lincolnshire				
	St Laurence's Church (lost)	East Ferry	West Lindsey				Survived until the late 18th Century.
	St Mary's Church (lost)	East Ferry	West Lindsey				Rebuilt around 1800.
	St Peter's Church	East Halton	North Lincolnshire	13th Century	Grade I	TA 14146 18452	
	St Helen's Church	East Keal	East Lindsey	13th Century	Grade II*		
	St Nicholas's Church	East Kirkby	East Lindsey	13th Century	Grade II*		
	St Martin's Church	East Ravendale	North East Lincolnshire	1857	Grade II	TF 23887 99602	
	St Peter's Church	East Stockwith	West Lindsey	1846	Grade II	SK 78747 94512	
	St Bartholomew's Church	Eastoft	North Lincolnshire	1855	Grade II	SE 80612 16603	
		Easton	South Kesteven				
	St Paul's Church (lost)	Eastville	East Lindsey	Between 1816 and 1840.	(formerly Grade II)		Closed in 2007 and demolished in 2015 due to subsidence.
		Edenham	South Kesteven				
		Edlington with Wispington	East Lindsey				
		Elkington	East Lindsey				
		Elsham	North Lincolnshire				
		Epworth	North Lincolnshire				
		Ewerby and Evedon	North Kesteven				
	All Saint's Church	Faldingworth	West Lindsey	14th Century	Grade II		
	St Andrew's Church	Farlesthorpe	East Lindsey	c. 1800	Grade II		
	All Saints' Church	Fenton	South Kesteven	12th Century	Grade I	SK 87852 50686	
		Fenton	West Lindsey				
	St Andrew's Church	Fillingham	West Lindsey	1180	Grade II*	SK 94801 85914	
	St Andrew's Church	Firsby	East Lindsey		Grade II	TF 45512 62636	Rebuilt in 1856.
	St Clement's Church	Fiskerton	West Lindsey	11th Century	Grade I	TF 04825 71986	
	St Mary's Church	Fleet	South Holland	1180	Grade I	TF 38888 23680	The steeple and body of the church are separate.
	All Saints' Church	Flixborough	North Lincolnshire	1886	Grade II	SE 87280 15054	
	St Andrew's Church	Folkingham	South Kesteven	12th Century	Grade I	TF 07126 33731	
	St Peter's Church	Foston	South Kesteven	12th Century	Grade I	SK 85867 42963	
	St Mary's Church	Fotherby	East Lindsey	13th Century	Grade II	TF 31699 91712	
	St Peter's Church	Friesthorpe	West Lindsey	13th Century	Grade II	TF 07202 83412	
	All Saints' Church	Friskney	East Lindsey	12th Century	Grade I	TF 46062 55402	
		Frithville and Westville	East Lindsey				
	St Nicholas's Church	Fulbeck	South Kesteven	10th Century	Grade I	SK 94756 50438	
	St Andrew's Church	Fulletby	East Lindsey	14th Century	Grade II	TF 29824 73391	
		Fulnetby	West Lindsey				
	St Lawrence's Church	Fulstow	East Lindsey	13th Century	Grade II		
		Gainsborough	West Lindsey				
		Garthorpe and Fockerby	North Lincolnshire				
	St Helen's Church	Gate Burton	West Lindsey		Grade II	SK 83890 82899	Current incarnation built in 1866.
	All Saint's Church	Gautby	East Lindsey	1754	Grade II*		
N/A	St George's Church	Gayton le Marsh	East Lindsey		N/A	TF 42514 84145	Demolished in 1971.
	St Peter's Church	Gayton le Wold	East Lindsey	1775	Grade II		
	St Mary Magdalene Church	Gedney	South Holland	13th Century	Grade I	TF 40278 24350	
	Holy Trinity Church	Gedney Hill	South Holland	14th Century	Grade II*	TF 33868 11273	
	St Peter's and St Paul's Church	Glentham (Gelntham)	West Lindsey	13th Century	Grade I	TF 00310 90462	
	St Nicholas' Church	Glentham (Caenby)	West Lindsey	Mediaeval	Grade II	TF 00003 89292	Rebuilt in the 19th Century.
		Glentworth	West Lindsey				
		Goltho	West Lindsey				
		Gosberton	South Holland				
		Goulceby	East Lindsey				
		Goxhill	North Lincolnshire				
	St Nicholas' Church	Grainsby	East Lindsey	12th Century	Grade II*		
	St Clement's Church	Grainthorpe	East Lindsey	13th Century	Grade I	TF 38772 96582	
N/A	N/A	Grange de Lings	West Lindsey	N/A	N/A	N/A	No parish church.
	St Wulfram's Church	Grantham	South Kesteven		Grade I		
	All Saints' Church	Grasby	West Lindsey	13th Century	Grade II	TA 08731 04908	
	St Radegund's Church	Grayingham	West Lindsey	13th Century	Grade II*	SK 93543 96180	
	St John's Church	Great Carlton	East Lindsey	15th Century	Grade II	TF 40812 85597	
	St Nicholas's Church	Great Coates	North East Lincolnshire	13th Century	Grade I	TA 23328 09784	
	St Sebastian's Church	Great Gonerby	South Kesteven	13th Century	Grade I	SK 89784 38117	
	St John's Church	Great Hale	North Kesteven	11th Century	Grade I	TF14841 42928	
	St Peter's Church	Great Limber	West Lindsey	12th Century	Grade I	TA 13501 08628	
	Holy Cross Church	Great Ponton	South Kesteven	13th Century	Grade I	SK 92490 30473	
	All Saints' Church	Great Steeping	East Lindsey	1891			
	Old All Saints' Church (redundant)	Great Steeping	East Lindsey	1748	Grade II*	TF 43476 63943	Built on the foundations of the lost mediæval church. Declared redundant in 1973. Now in the care of the Churches Conservation Trust.
N/A	(lost)	Great Steeping	East Lindsey				
	All Saint's Church	Great Sturton	East Lindsey	11th Century	Grade II*		
	St Thomas's Church	Greatford	South Kesteven	11th Century	Grade I	TF08608 11965	
	All Saint's Church	Greetham with Somersby (Greetham)	East Lindsey	12th Century	Grade II	TF 30845 70813	Partially rebuilt in 1903.
	St Margaret's Church	Greetham with Somersby (Somersby)	East Lindsey	15th Century	Grade II*	TF 34364 72659	Please of baptism of Alfred, Lord Tennyson.
	St Andrew's Church	Greetham with Somersby (Ashby Puerorum)	East Lindsey	13th Century	Grade II*	TF 32801 71412	
	St Margaret's Church	Greetham with Somersby (Bag Enderby)	East Lindsey	1407	Grade II*	TF 34922 72049	
	All Saints' Church	Greetwell	West Lindsey	11th Century	Grade II*	TF 01354 71532	
	St Edith's Church	Grimoldby	East Lindsey	13th Century	Grade I	TF 39281 87954	
	Grimsby Minster	Grimsby	North East Lincolnshire				
	St Nicholas' Church	Gunby and Stainby (Gunby)	South Kesteven	15th Century	Grade II	SK 91273 21554	
	St Peter's Church	Gunby and Stainby (Stainby)	South Kesteven	14th Century	Grade II	SK 90528 22820	Rebuilt in 1865.
	St Barnabas' Church	Gunness	North Lincolnshire	20th Century	N/A	SE 84306 11268	
	St Margaret's Church	Habrough	North East Lincolnshire		Grade II	TA 15503 14310	Rebuilt in 1868-69
		Hackthorn	West Lindsey				
	St Andrew's Church	Haconby	South Kesteven	12th Century	Grade I	TF 10672 25262	Spire damaged by the 2008 Lincolnshire Earthquake.
	Holy Trinity Church	Hagworthingham	East Lindsey	11th Century	Grade II*	TF 34385 69228	
	St Mary's Church	Hainton	East Lindsey	11th Century	Grade I	TF 18023 84485	
N/A	St Lawrence's Church (lost)	Hallington	East Lindsey		N/A	TF 30594 85629	Only the graveyard remains.
	St Benedict's Church	Haltham	East Lindsey	12th Century	Grade I	TF 24609 63845	
	St Andrew's Church	Halton Holegate	East Lindsey	14th Century	Grade II*	TF 41794 65100	
	All Saint's Church	Hameringham	East Lindsey	c. 1200	Grade II		
	St Andrew's Church	Hannah cum Hagnaby (Hannah)	East Lindsey	1758	Grade I	TF 49981 79439	
	Hagnaby Abbey	Hannah cum Hagnaby (Hagnaby)	East Lindsey	c. 1175	N/A	TF 48415 80637	Suppressed in 1536. Is a Scheduled Ancient Monument.
		Hardwick	West Lindsey				
	St Mary's and St Peter's Church	Harlaxton	South Kesteven	12th Century	Grade I	SK 88268 32644	
		Harmston	North Kesteven				
	St Chad's Church	Harpswell	West Lindsey	1042	Grade I		
		Harrington	East Lindsey				
		Hatcliffe	North East Lincolnshire				
	St Stephen's Church	Hatton	East Lindsey	13th Century	Grade II	TF 17737 76842	Rebuilt in 1870.
	St Leonard's Church	Haugh	East Lindsey	11th Century	Grade I	TF 41562 75929	Restored in 1873.
	All Saints' Church	Haugham	East Lindsey				
		Hawerby cum Beesby	North East Lincolnshire				
		Haxey	North Lincolnshire				
		Healing	North East Lincolnshire				
		Heapham	West Lindsey				
		Heckington	North Kesteven				
		Heighington	North Kesteven				
	St Andrew's Church	Helpringham	North Kesteven	13th Century	Grade I	TF 13875 40750	
	St Margaret's Church	Hemingby	East Lindsey	14th Century	Grade II		
		Hemswell	West Lindsey				
		Hemswell Cliff	West Lindsey				
		Heydour	South Kesteven				
		Hibaldstow	North Lincolnshire				
	St John's Church	High Toynton	East Lindsey	12th Century	Grade II	TF 28357 69883	Rebuilt in 1872. Bell tower collapsed in 2020 and is in the process of being rebuilt.
	St Mary's Church	Hogsthorpe	East Lindsey	12th Century	Grade I	TF 53416 72216	
	All Saints' Church	Holbeach	South Holland	1340-1380	Grade I	TF 35910 24789	May be partially built from the ruins of nearby Moulton Castle.
	All Saints' Church	Holton cum Beckering	West Lindsey	13th Century	Grade I	TF 11630 81285	
	St Peter's Church	Holton le Clay	East Lindsey	c. 11th Century	Grade II*		
	St Luke's Church	Holton le Moor	West Lindsey	11th Century	Grade II	TF 08212 97820	
	St Wilfrid's Church	Honington	South Kesteven	11th Century	Grade I	SK 94326 43390	
	St Andrew's Church	Horbling	South Kesteven	12th Century	Grade I	TF 11887 35179	
	St Maurice's Church	Horkstow	North Lincolnshire	13th Century	Grade I	SE 98721 18225	
	St Mary's Church	Horncastle	East Lindsey	13th Century	Grade II*	TF 25855 69555	
	All Saint's Church	Horsington	East Lindsey	Rebuilt 1858	Grade II		
	All Saints' Church	Hough-on-the-Hill	South Kesteven	11th Century	Grade I	SK 92323 46406	
	All Saints' Church	Hougham	South Kesteven	11th Century	Grade I	SK88659 44222	
	St Peter's Church	Humberston	North East Lincolnshire	15th Century	Grade II*	TA 31094 05278	
	St Mary's Church	Hundleby	East Lindsey	14th Century	Grade II	TF 38920 66526	
	St Margaret's Church	Huttoft	East Lindsey	13th Century	Grade I	TF 51152 76421	
		Immingham	North East Lincolnshire				
		Ingham	West Lindsey				
		Ingoldmells	East Lindsey				
	St Bartholomew's Church	Ingoldsby	South Kesteven	12th Century	Grade I	TF 01025 30070	
	St Andrew's Church	Irby	North East Lincolnshire	12th Century	Grade I	TA 19591 04958	
	All Saints' Church	Irby in the Marsh	East Lindsey	13th Century	Grade II*	TF 46846 63758	
	St Andrew's Church	Irnham	South Kesteven	12th Century	Grade I	TF 02347 26675	
	St Oswald's Church	Keadby with Althorpe (Althorpe)	North Lincolnshire		Grade I	SE 83478 09625	Rebuilt in 1483.
	St Margaret's Church	Keddington	East Lindsey	12th Century	Grade II*	TF 34492 88663	
	St Batholomew's Church	Keelby	West Lindsey	13th Century	Grade I	TA 16503 09949	
	St Peter's and St Paul's Church	Kettlethorpe	West Lindsey	15th Century	Grade II	SK 84822 75695	
	St Paul's Church	Kexby	West Lindsey	13th Century	Grade II	SE 70060 51034	Partially rebuilt in 1852.
	St Deny's Church	Kirkby la Thorpe	North Kesteven	12th Century	Grade II*	TF 09907 46092	
	St Mary's Church	Kirkby on Bain	East Lindsey	Norman, rebuilt in 1802	Grade II		
	St Mary's and All Saints' Church	Kirkby Underwood	South Kesteven	11th Century	Grade I	TF 06981 27045	
		Kirmington	North Lincolnshire				
		Kirmond le Mire	West Lindsey				
		Kirton in Lindsey	North Lincolnshire				
		Knaith	West Lindsey				
		Laceby	North East Lincolnshire				
		Langriville	East Lindsey				
	St Michael's Church	Langtoft	South Kesteven	13th Century	Grade I	TF 12341 12552	
	St Margaret's Church	Langton	East Lindsey	13th Century	Grade II	TF 23724 68990	
	St Peter's and St Paul's Church	Langton by Spilsby	East Lindsey		Grade I	TF 38987 70396	Rebuilt in 1725 after previous church destroyed by fire.
	St Giles' Church	Langton by Wragby	East Lindsey	14th Century	Grade II	TF14934 76877	
	All Saints' Church	Laughton	West Lindsey	12th Century	Grade I	SK84912 97300	
	St Helen's Church	Lea	West Lindsey	13th Century	Grade I	SK83078 86678	
	St Swithin's Church	Leadenham	North Kesteven	13th Century	Grade I	SK 95038 51747	
	St Andrew's Church	Leasingham	North Kesteven	12th Century	Grade I	TF 05659 48553	
	All Saints' Church	Legbourne	East Lindsey	c. 1380	Grade I	TF36762 84430	
	St Thomas' Church	Legsby	West Lindsey	13th Century	Grade II	TF 13706 85659	
	St Peter's Church	Lenton, Keisby and Osgodby (Lenton)	South Kesteven	13th Century	Grade I	TF 02588 30351	
	St Cornelius' Church	Linwood	West Lindsey	12th Century	Grade I	TF 11405 85687	
	St John's Church	Lissington	West Lindsey	1796	Grade II	TF10915 83553	
	St Medardus' and St Gildardus' Church	Little Bytham	South Kesteven	10th Century	Grade I	TF 01293 18036	
	St Edith's Church (lost)	Little Carlton	East Lindsey		Grade II	TF40351 85370	Largely rebuilt in 1837. Declared redundant in 1981 and demolished in 1993.
	St Helen's Church (redundant)	Little Cawthorpe	East Lindsey	1860	Grade II	TF 35698 83746	Declared redundant in April 1996. Now under the care of the Churches Conservation Trust.
		Little Hale	North Kesteven				
	St Guthlac's Church	Little Ponton and Stroxton (Little Ponton)	South Kesteven	11th Century	Grade I	SK 92487 32234	
	All Saints' Church	Little Ponton and Stroxton (Stroxton)	South Kesteven	12th Century	Grade II*	SK 90235 31068	
	St Andrew's Church	Little Steeping	East Lindsey	14th Century	Grade II*	TF 43358 63556	
		Little Sutton	South Holland				
		Londonthorpe and Harrowby Without	South Kesteven				
		Long Bennington	South Kesteven				
		Long Sutton	South Holland				
	St James Church	Louth	East Lindsey		Grade I		
		Low Toynton	East Lindsey				
		Ludborough	East Lindsey				
		Luddington and Haldenby	North Lincolnshire				
	St Mary's and St Peter's Church	Ludford (Ludford Magna)	East Lindsey	1864	Grade II	TF 20056 89268	
	St Peter's Church	Lusby with Winceby	East Lindsey	11th Century	Grade I		
	St Margaret's Church (lost)	Lusby with Winceby	East Lindsey	N/A	N/A		
	St Nicholas' Church	Lutton	South Holland	16th Century	Grade I	TF 43307 25559	
		Mablethorpe and Sutton	East Lindsey				
		Maidenwell	East Lindsey				
		Maltby le Marsh	East Lindsey				
		Manby	East Lindsey				
	St Hybald's Church (redundant)	Manton	North Lincolnshire		Grade II	SE 93404 02692	Rebuilt in 1861. Declared redundant in 1998 and now owned privately.
	St Helen's Church	Mareham le Fen	East Lindsey	13th Century	Grade II*	TF 27833 61259	
	All Saints' Church	Mareham on the Hill	East Lindsey	15th Century	Grade II*	TF 28815 67874	
	St Peter's Church	Markby	East Lindsey	16th Century	Grade II*	TF 48724 78816	Only thatched church in Lincolnshire. Incorporates features from the earlier nearby, and now lost, priory.
		Market Deeping	South Kesteven				
		Market Rasen	West Lindsey				
		Market Stainton	East Lindsey				
		Marshchapel	East Lindsey				
		Marston	South Kesteven				
		Martin	North Kesteven				
		Marton	West Lindsey				
	St Michael's Church	Mavis Enderby	East Lindsey	14th Century	Grade II*	TF 36347 66577	
	Holy Ascension Church	Melton Ross	North Lincolnshire	1867	Grade II	TA 07147 10748	
	Holy Trinity Church	Messingham	North Lincolnshire	13th Century	Grade II*	SE 89033 04805	
	St Wilfred's Church	Metheringham	North Kesteven	12th Century	Grade II*	TF 07017 61288	
	(two churches)	Middle Rasen	West Lindsey				
		Midville	East Lindsey				
	St Andrew's Church	Minting	East Lindsey	13th Century	Grade II*	TF 18727 73460	
	St Paul's Church	Morton	West Lindsey		Grade II*	SK 80987 91463	Current building dating from 1891.
	St John's Church	Morton and Hanthorpe	South Kesteven	12th Century	Grade I	TF 09826 24010	
N/A	Holy Trinity Church (lost)	Muckton	East Lindsey		N/A	TF 37510 81396	Declared redundant 1981 and demolished October 1982.
	St Thomas' Church	Mumby	East Lindsey	13th Century	Grade I	TF 51563 74433	
	St Peter's Church	Navenby	North Kesteven	13th Century	Grade I	SK 98650 57843	
	All Saints' Church	Nettleham	West Lindsey	13th Century	Grade I	TF 00771 75323	
	St John's Church	Nettleton	West Lindsey	11th Century	Grade II*	TA 11111 00196	
		New Holland	North Lincolnshire				
		New Leake	East Lindsey				
		New Waltham	North East Lincolnshire				
		Newball	West Lindsey				
		Newton and Haceby	North Kesteven				
		Newton on Trent	West Lindsey				
	St Peter's Church (demolished)	Nocton	North Kesteven		N/A		Replaced by a new church nearby also called St Peter's in 1775, which itself was replaced by All Saints' Church in 1862.
	St Peter's Church (demolished)	Nocton	North Kesteven	1775	N/A		Replaced the previous St Peter's Church nearby.
	All Saints' Church	Nocton	North Kesteven	1862	Grade II*	TF 06067 64125	Built on the site of a previous St Peter's Church built in 1775.
	St Peter's Church	Normanby by Spital	West Lindsey	12th Century	Grade I	TF 00113 88110	Churches Conservation Trust church.
	St Peter's Church	Normanby le Wold	West Lindsey	13th Century	Grade II*	TF 12299 94738	
	St Nicholas' Church (redundant)	Normanton (Normanton-on-Cliffe)	South Kesteven	11th Century	Grade II*	SK 94893 46249	Now cared for by the Churches Conservation Trust.
	St Luke's Church	North Carlton	West Lindsey	15th Century	Grade II*	SK 94553 77639	Partially rebuilt in the 1770s.
N/A	Not in parish, in parish of Alvingham.	North Cockerington	East Lindsey	N/A	N/A	N/A	St Mary's Church serves this parish, but is in the neighbouring parish of Alvingham.
	St Nicholas' Church	North Cotes	East Lindsey	13th Century	Grade II*	TA 35030 00645	Partially rebuilt in 1865.
		North Hykeham	North Kesteven				
		North Kelsey	West Lindsey				
		North Killingholme	North Lincolnshire				
	St Luke's Church	North Kyme	North Kesteven	1877	Grade II	TF 15319 52705	
	St Helen's Church	North Ormsby	East Lindsey	1848	Grade II		Declared redundant in 1980, now a private residence.
	North Ormsby Priory	North Ormsby	East Lindsey	Post Norman	Scheduled Ancient Monument		Gilbertine Order
	St Peter's Church	North Rauceby	North Kesteven		Grade I	TF 02116 46448	
	All Saints' Church	North Scarle	North Kesteven	12th Century	Grade I	SK 84821 66737	
	(two churches)	North Somercotes	East Lindsey				
	St Helen's Church	North Thoresby	East Lindsey	13th Century	Grade II*		
		North Willingham	West Lindsey				
		North Witham	South Kesteven				
		Northorpe	West Lindsey				
		Norton Disney	North Kesteven				
		Old Somerby	South Kesteven				
	All Saint's Church	Orby	East Lindsey	13th Century	Grade II		
	St Peter's and St Paul's Church	Osbournby	North Kesteven	12th Century	Grade I	TF 06960 38134	
		Osgodby	West Lindsey				
	St Martin's Church	Owersby	West Lindsey				
		Owmby-by-Spital	West Lindsey				
		Owston Ferry	North Lincolnshire				
	St Nicholas's Church	Partney	East Lindsey	14th Century	Grade II*	TF 41042 68367	
	St Andrew's Church	Pickworth	South Kesteven	12th Century	Grade I	TF 04416 33679	
		Pilham	West Lindsey				
		Pinchbeck	South Holland				
		Pointon and Sempringham	South Kesteven				
		Potter Hanworth	North Kesteven				
		Quadring	South Holland				
	Holy Trinity Church	Raithby	East Lindsey	12th Century	Grade II*	TF 37379 67065	
	St Peter's Church	Raithby cum Maltby	East Lindsey	13th Century	Grade II	TF 31016 84718	
	St German's Church	Ranby	East Lindsey	12th Century	Grade II	TF 22768 79090	
	St Oswald's Church	Rand	West Lindsey	12th Century	Grade II*	TF10699 79070	
	St Andrew's Church (redundant)	Redbourne	North Lincolnshire	14th Century	Grade I	SK 97340 99944	Declared redundant in 1978 and now in the care of the Churches Conservation Trust.
		Reepham	West Lindsey				
		Reston	East Lindsey				
		Revesby	East Lindsey				
		Riby	West Lindsey				
		Rigsby with Ailby	East Lindsey				
		Rippingale	South Kesteven				
		Riseholme	West Lindsey				
	St Peter's Church	Ropsley and Humby	South Kesteven				
		Rothwell	West Lindsey				
	St Margaret's Church	Roughton	East Lindsey	13th Century	Grade II*		
	St Michael's Church	Roughton (Martin near Horncastle)	East Lindsey	12th Century	Grade II*		
N/A	St Martin's Church (lost, 1742)	Roughton (Dalderby)	East Lindsey	N/A	N/A		
	St Clement's Church	Rowston	North Kesteven	12th Century	Grade I	TF 08403 56406	
		Roxby cum Risby	North Lincolnshire				
		Roxholm	North Kesteven				
		Ruskington	North Kesteven				
		Saltfleetby	East Lindsey				
		Sausthorpe	East Lindsey				
		Saxby	West Lindsey				
		Saxby All Saints	North Lincolnshire				
		Saxilby with Ingleby	West Lindsey				
	St Martin's Church	Scamblesby	East Lindsey	12th Century	Grade II		Rebuilt 1893
	St John's Church	Scampton	West Lindsey	14th Century	Grade II*		
	St Hybald's Church	Scawby	North Lincolnshire	13th Century	Grade II*		Restored 1843 and 1870.
	Church of the Holy Cross	Scopwick	North Kesteven				
	Church of the Holy Cross	Scopwick (Kirkby Green)	North Kesteven				
	St Germain's Church	Scothern	West Lindsey	13th Century	Grade II*		
	St Peter's Church	Scotter	West Lindsey	12th Century	Grade I		
	St Genewys' Church	Scotton	West Lindsey	12th Century	Grade I	SK 89038 99099	
	St Andrew's Church	Scredington	North Kesteven	15th Century	Grade II	TF 09601 40403	
	St Benedict's Church	Scrivelsby	East Lindsey	13th Century	Grade II*	TF 26552 65774	
		Searby cum Owmby	West Lindsey				
	St Lawrence's Church	Sedgebrook	South Kesteven	13th Century	Grade I	SK85759 38042	
	St Margaret's Church	Sibsey	East Lindsey	12th Century	Grade I	TF35440 50743	
	St Denys's Church	Silk Willoughby	North Kesteven	12th Century	Grade I	TF 05726 43003	
	All Saints' Church	Sixhills	West Lindsey	13th Century	Grade II	TF 17023 87122	
		Skegness	East Lindsey				
		Skellingthorpe	North Kesteven				
		Skendleby	East Lindsey				
		Skidbrooke with Saltfleet Haven	East Lindsey				
		Skillington	South Kesteven				
	St Denys' Church	Sleaford	North Kesteven		Grade I		
		Snarford	West Lindsey				
	All Saints	Snelland	West Lindsey		Grade II		
	St Nicholas's Church	Snitterby	West Lindsey	1866	Grade II	SK 98574 94696	
		Somerby	West Lindsey				
	St Peter's Church	Sotby	East Lindsey	12th Century	Grade II*	TF 20429 78869	Restored in 1857 by Michael Drury.
	St John's Church	South Carlton	West Lindsey	12th Century	Grade I	SK 95084 76673	
	St Leonard's Church	South Cockerington	East Lindsey	14th Century	Grade I	TF 38152 88727	Restored 1872-3
	St Nicolas' Church	South Ferriby	North Lincolnshire	13th Century	Grade II*	SE 98845 20838	
	St Michael's Church	South Hykeham	North Kesteven	13th Century	Grade II*	SK 93685 64539	
	St Mary's Church	South Kelsey	West Lindsey	13th Century	Grade II	TF 04168 98218	
		South Killingholme	North Lincolnshire				
	St Mary's and All Saint's Church	South Kyme	North Kesteven	Before 1196	Grade II*		Rebuilt 1890. Formerly part of the priory.
N/A	Kyme Priory	South Kyme	North Kesteven	Before 1196	Scheduled Ancient Monument		Dissolved 1539.
	St Leonard's Church	South Ormsby cum Ketsby (South Ormsby)	East Lindsey	12th Century	Grade I		Restored 1871-1872 by James Fowler.
N/A	St Margaret's Church (lost)	South Ormsby cum Ketsby (Ketsby)	East Lindsey	N/A	N/A		
		South Rauceby	North Kesteven				
		South Somercotes	East Lindsey				
	St Andrew's Church	South Thoresby	East Lindsey	1738	Grade II*	TF 40139 77070	
	St Martin's Church	South Willingham	East Lindsey	13th Century	Grade II*	TF 19500 83331	
	St John's Church	South Witham	South Kesteven	12th Century	Grade I	SK 92718 19409	
	St Mary and St Nicolas Church	Spalding	South Holland				
		Spilsby	East Lindsey				
	St Hilary's Church	Spridlington	West Lindsey	1875	Grade II	TF 00796 84535	
N/A	St Hilary's and St Albinus's Church (lost)	Spridlington	West Lindsey		N/A		
	St Lawrence's and St George's Church	Springthorpe	West Lindsey	11th Century	Grade I	SK87566 89756	
	St Andrew's Church	Stainfield	West Lindsey	1711	Grade II*	TF 11190 73208	
		Stainton by Langworth	West Lindsey				
		Stainton le Vale	West Lindsey				
		Stallingborough	North East Lincolnshire				
	All Saints Church	Stamford	South Kesteven				
	St Martin's Church	Stamford	South Kesteven				
	St Mary's Church	Stamford	South Kesteven				
	All Saint's Church	Stapleford	North Kesteven	11th Century	Grade II		Partially rebuilt in 1770.
	St Nicholas's Church	Stenigot	East Lindsey	1892	Grade II		
	St Nicholas's Church (dilapidated)	Stenigot	East Lindsey	11th Century			In a state of ruin for many years.
	St Andrew's Church	Stewton	East Lindsey	11th Century	Grade II*		Partly rebuilt in 1866 by James Fowler
	St Helen's Church	Stickford	East Lindsey	13th Century	Grade II*	TF 35189 60039	
	St Luke's Church	Stickney	East Lindsey	13th Century	Grade II*	TF 34337 57071	
	St Peter's Church	Stixwould and Woodhall (Stixwould)	East Lindsey	Rebuilt in 1831	Grade II		
N/A	St Margaret's Church (lost 1972)	Stixwould and Woodhall (Old Woodhall)	East Lindsey	14th Century	N/A		
N/A	Stixwould Priory	Stixwould and Woodhall (Stixwould)	East Lindsey	1135	Scheduled Ancient Monument		
		Stoke Rochford	South Kesteven				
	Stow Minster	Stow in Lindsey	West Lindsey	Saxon	Grade I		
	St Oswald's Church	Strubby with Woodthorpe (Strubby)	East Lindsey	14th Century	Grade II*		Partially rebuilt in 1857
	St Martin's Church	Stubton	South Kesteven	1799	Grade II*	SK 87476 48779	
	St Hugh's Church	Sturton by Stow	West Lindsey	1879	Grade II	SK 89020 80461	The parish church is Stow Minster.
		Sudbrooke	West Lindsey				
		Surfleet	South Holland				
		Sutton Bridge	South Holland				
		Sutton St Edmund	South Holland				
	St James' Church	Sutton St James	South Holland	15th Century	Grade II	TF 39654 18393	
	St Nicholas's Church	Swaby	East Lindsey	1828	Grade II		
	Holy Trinity Church	Swallow	West Lindsey	12th Century	Grade II*	TA 17613 03029	
	St Michael's Church	Swaton	North Kesteven	12th Century	Grade I	TF 13300 37521	
	St Nicolas' Church	Swayfield	South Kesteven	12th Century	Grade II	SK 99324 22644	
	All Saints' Church	Swinderby	North Kesteven	12th Century	Grade II*	SK 86902 63179	
	St Helen's Church	Swinhope	West Lindsey	13th Century	Grade II	TF 21558 96240	
	St Mary's Church	Swinstead	South Kesteven	13th Century	Grade I	TF 01860 22454	
	St Mary's Church	Syston	South Kesteven	11th Century	Grade II*	SK 92979 40941	
	St Lawrence's Church	Tallington	South Kesteven	12th Century	Grade I	TF09137 07859	
	St Vedast's Church	Tathwell	East Lindsey	12th Century	Grade II*	TF 32051 82924	
		Tattershall	East Lindsey				
		Tattershall Thorpe	East Lindsey				
		Tealby	West Lindsey				
		Temple Bruer with Temple High Grange	North Kesteven				
	St Mary's Church	Tetford	East Lindsey	12th Century	Grade II*	TF 33397 74804	
	St Peter's and St Paul's Church	Tetney	East Lindsey	1363	Grade I	TA 31667 00892	
		The Moultons	South Holland				
		Theddlethorpe All Saints	East Lindsey				
		Theddlethorpe St Helen	East Lindsey				
	St Margaret's Church	Thimbleby	East Lindsey				Closed in 2010.
		Thonock	West Lindsey				
	St Mary's Church	Thoresway	West Lindsey	12th Century	Grade II	TF 16662 96638	
	All Saints' Church	Thorganby	West Lindsey	13th Century	Grade II	TF 20813 97610	
	St Lawrence's Church	Thornton Curtis	North Lincolnshire	12th Century	Grade I	TA 08796 17874	
		Thornton le Fen	East Lindsey				
N/A	St Mary's Church (lost)	Thorpe in the Fallows	West Lindsey		N/A	SK91220 80720	Demolished in the 17th Century.
	St Michael's Church	Thorpe on the Hill	North Kesteven	13th Century	Grade II	SK 90859 65464	
	St Peter's Church	Thorpe St Peter	East Lindsey	13th Century	Grade I	TF 48497 60684	
	St Peter's Church	Threekingham	North Kesteven	12th Century	Grade I	TF 08954 36138	
	St Germain's Church	Thurlby	North Kesteven	11th Century	Grade II*	SK 90895 61713	
	St Firmin's Church	Thurlby	South Kesteven	11th Century	Grade I		
	St Andrew's Church	Timberland	North Kesteven	12th Century	Grade II*		
	St Michael's Church	Toft Newton (Newton by Toft)	West Lindsey	12th Century	Grade II*	TF 05104 87358	
	St Peter's and St Paul's Church (redundant)	Toft Newton (Toft next Newton)	West Lindsey	13th Century	Grade II	TF 04214 88150	Closed in 1986 and now a private residence.
		Toft with Lound and Manthorpe	South Kesteven				
		Torksey	West Lindsey				
		Toynton All Saints	East Lindsey				
		Toynton St Peter	East Lindsey				
		Tumby	East Lindsey				
		Tupholme	East Lindsey				
	St Mary's Church	Tydd St Mary	South Holland	12th Century	Grade I	TF 44611 18591	
	St Michael's and All Angel's Church	Uffington	South Kesteven	13th Century	Grade I	TF06155 07743	
	St Nichols' Church	Ulceby	North Lincolnshire	13th Century	Grade I	TA10341 14607	
	All Saints' Church	Ulceby with Fordington (Ulceby)	East Lindsey	1826	Grade II	TF 42243 72614	
N/A	(lost)	Ulceby with Fordington (Fordington)	East Lindsey				
	All Saint's Church	Upton	West Lindsey	12th Century	Grade II*		
	St Andrew's Church	Utterby	East Lindsey	14th Century	Grade II		
	St Mary's and St Peter's Church	Waddingham	West Lindsey	13th Century	Grade II*	SK 98739 96355	
		Waddington	North Kesteven				
	St Margaret's Church	Waddingworth	East Lindsey	14th Century	Grade II	TF 18515 71222	
		Wainfleet All Saints	East Lindsey				
		Wainfleet St Mary	East Lindsey				
		Waithe	East Lindsey				
		Walcot near Folkingham	North Kesteven				
		Walcott	North Kesteven				
		Walesby	West Lindsey				
N/A	No church in parish.	Walkerith	West Lindsey	N/A	N/A	N/A	
		Walmsgate	East Lindsey				
		Waltham	North East Lincolnshire				
		Washingborough	North Kesteven				
		Welbourn	North Kesteven				
	St Bartholomew's Church	Welby	South Kesteven		Grade I		Restored 1848 to 1873.
		Well	East Lindsey				
	All Saint's Church	Wellingore	North Kesteven	12th Century	Grade I		
	St Mary's Church	Welton	West Lindsey	13th Century	Grade II*	TF 01141 79765	
		Welton le Marsh	East Lindsey				
		Welton le Wold	East Lindsey				
	All Saint's Church	West Ashby	East Lindsey	12th Century	Grade I		
		West Barkwith	East Lindsey				
		West Butterwick	North Lincolnshire				
		West Deeping	South Kesteven				
		West Fen	East Lindsey				
		West Firsby	West Lindsey				
		West Halton	North Lincolnshire				
	St Helen's Church	West Keal	East Lindsey	13th Century	Grade II*	TF 36749 63754	
		West Rasen	West Lindsey				
		West Ravendale	North East Lincolnshire				
	St Mary's Church (redundant)	West Torrington	East Lindsey	14th Century	Grade II	TF 13501 82049	Declared redundant in 2011. Rebuilt in 1860.
		Westborough and Dry Doddington	South Kesteven				
		Weston	South Holland				
		Whaplode	South Holland				
		Whitton	North Lincolnshire				
	St Peter's and St Lawrence's Church	Wickenby	West Lindsey	12th Century	Grade II*	TF 08802 81959	
		Wildmore	East Lindsey				
		Wildsworth	West Lindsey				
		Willingham	West Lindsey				
		Willoughby with Sloothby	East Lindsey				
		Willoughton	West Lindsey				
	St Mary's Church	Wilsford	North Kesteven	11th Century	Grade I	TF00658 43023	
	All Saints' Church	Winteringham	North Lincolnshire	11th Century	Grade I	SE 92485 22458	
	All Saints' Church	Winterton	North Lincolnshire	c. 1080	Grade I	SE 92831 18590	Built on the site of an earlier Anglo-Saxon church.
	St Andrew's Church	Witham on the Hill	South Kesteven	12th Century	Grade I	TF 05297 16589	
		Witham St Hughs	North Kesteven				
	St Martin's Church	Withcall	East Lindsey	1882	Grade II	TF 28405 84068	
	St Margaret's Church (redundant)	Withern with Stain (Withern)	East Lindsey	15th Century	Grade II	TF42480 82188	Now a private residence.
	All Saints' Church (All Hallows' Church)	Wold Newton	North East Lincolnshire	1862	Grade II	TF24192 96781	Some sources, including Historic England, have the name as All Hallows' Church. Rebuilt in 1862 by James Fowler.
	St Benedict's Church	Wood Enderby (Wood Enderby)	East Lindsey		Grade II	TF 27356 64133	Rebuilt in 1860.
	All Saints' Church	Wood Enderby (Wilksby)	East Lindsey	1791	Grade II	TF28396 63508	
	St Peter's Church	Woodhall Spa	East Lindsey	1893	N/A		
	St Andrew's Church (lost 1957)	Woodhall Spa	East Lindsey	1846-47	N/A	TF 19179 63106	Built using stone from Stixwould Priory. Damaged by a parachute mine during the Second World War.
	St Leonard's Without Church	Woodhall Spa (Kirkstead)	East Lindsey	13th Century	Grade I	TF 19008 61372	
	St James's Church	Woolsthorpe By Belvoir	South Kesteven	1847	Grade II	SK 83659 33876	
	St Andrew's Church	Wootton	North Lincolnshire	13th Century	Grade I	TA 08904 16172	Restored in 1851.
	St Clement's Church	Worlaby	North Lincolnshire	11th Century	Grade II*		Partly rebuilt 1873-1877 by W Scott Champion.
	All Saint's Church	Wragby	East Lindsey	1839	Grade II		By W. A. Nicholson
	All Saint's Church	Wragby	East Lindsey	12th Century	Scheduled Ancient Monument		Original parish church, replaced with newer church to the north in the 19th Century.
	St Mary's Church	Wrawby	North Lincolnshire	12th Century	Grade I		
	St Pancras's Church	Wroot	North Lincolnshire	1878			Current church built in 1878.
	All Saint's Church (redundant)	Wyham cum Cadeby	East Lindsey	13th Century	Grade II		Declared redundant in 1982.
	St Catherine's Church	Wyville cum Hungerton	South Kesteven	1857	Grade II		Current church built in 1857.
	St John's Church	Yarburgh	East Lindsey	14th Century	Grade I		In the care of the Churches Conservation Trust.
	St Peter's Church	Lincoln		18th Century	Grade II		

== Roman Catholic Church ==
Lincolnshire is in the Roman Catholic Diocese of Nottingham.

See also: Category:Roman Catholic church buildings in Lincolnshire

Image	Name	Civil Parish	District	Date/Era	Conservation Listing	Coordinates	Notes
Holy Rood Catholic Church - Market Rasen	Holy Rood Church	Market Rasen	West Lindsey	19th Century	N/A		

== Other Churches ==
See also: Category:Baptist churches in Lincolnshire and Category:Methodist churches in Lincolnshire

=== Pentecostal ===
- Cornerstone Christian Centre, Gainsborough
- Alive, Lincoln
- Bridge, Lincoln
- Ignite Elim Church, Lincoln
- New Life, Market Rasen
- Life Church Lincoln (Birchwood)

=== New Frontiers ===
- Grace Church, Lincoln

The church is now closed up
