= Revesby Abbey =

Cistercian monastery in Lincolnshire, England

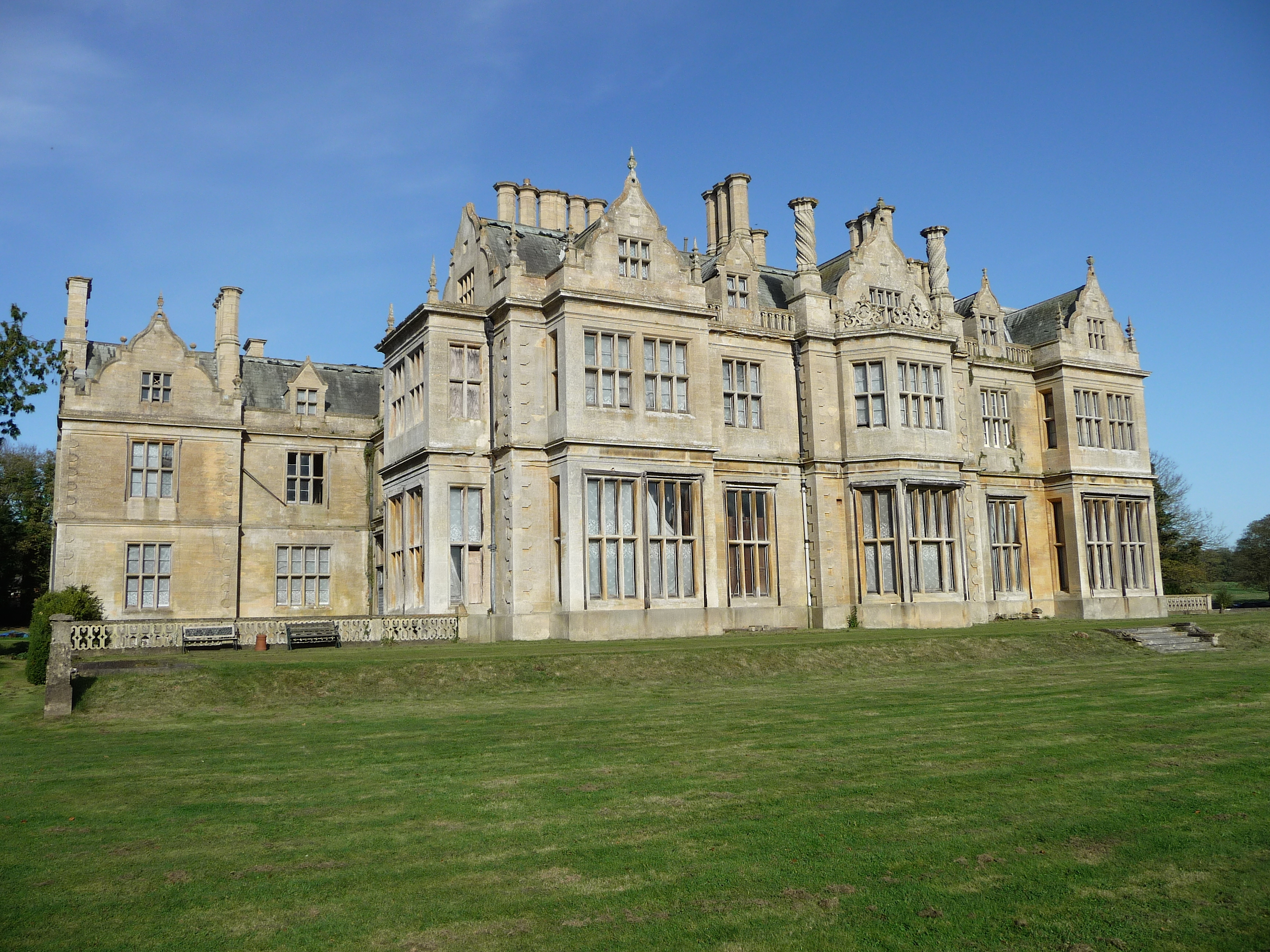
- William Burn’s house built on the site in 1845

- Location within Lincolnshire

Monastery information
- Full name: The Abbey Church of St Laurence, Revesby
- Order: Cistercian
- Established: 1143
- Disestablished: c.1539
- Mother house: Rievaulx Abbey
- Dedication: St Mary and St Laurence
- Diocese: Diocese of Lincoln
- Controlled churches: Revesby, Scithesby, Hagnaby, Frodingham, Theddlethorpe

People
- Founder: William de Roumare, Earl of Lincoln

Site
- Location: Revesby, Lincolnshire, England
- Coordinates: 53°07′42″N 0°03′37″W
- Visible remains: earthworks
- Public access: no

Revesby Abbey was a Cistercian monastery near the village of Revesby in Lincolnshire, England. The abbey was founded in 1143 by William de Roumare, Earl of Lincoln, and the first monks came from Rievaulx Abbey.

After the Dissolution of the Monasteries in the 16th century, the Abbey was demolished and a country house built. Another house was built in the mid-19th century, and is in poor condition. Unoccupied since the 1960s and previously earmarked for demolition, the house was listed on the 2023 Heritage at Risk Register issued annually by Historic England. The register recorded that, although some progress had been made in relation to the repair and renovation of the stable block, the main house remained at "serious risk".

== History ==
Revesby Abbey was founded in 1142 by William de Roumare, Earl of Lincoln, who became a monk at the abbey in his later life, and was then buried within the abbey. The first monks at the abbey were sent from Rievaulx Abbey in Yorkshire. The abbey was endowed with land at Revesby, Scithesby and Thoresby, and with the advowsons of the churches of Hagnaby and Scithesby.

During the mid-12th century, the monks of Revesby offered land in other villages to its tenants in the villages of Stichesby and Thoresby, if they would move. All 13 families left Stichesby and all 11 from Thoresby, leaving both of these settlements unpopulated. In the 14th century the abbey acquired the manor of Mareham and was granted permission to hold a weekly market and an annual fair there. In 1534 the abbey was recorded as having an income of £1287 2s. 4½d. (equivalent to £1,080,000 in 2025), and was in control of the manors of Claxby, East Keal, Hagnaby, Hameringham, Mareham-le-Fen, Mavis Enderby, Sibsey, Stickney and Toynton. However, despite this, the abbey's income appears to have been mismanaged, and in 1538 the Duke of Norfolk wrote to Thomas Cromwell to inform him the abbey was "in great ruin and decay". The abbey was dissolved c.1539.

=== Abbots of Revesby Abbey ===
List of known Abbots of Revesby Abbey:

William, first abbot, 1142
Aelred of Rievaulx, occurs 1143, until 1147,
Walo, occurs 1155
Hugh, occurs 1176 and 1200
Ralf, occurs 1208
Elias, occurs 1216 and 1231
Matthew
William, occurs 1255
Walter, occurs 1257 and 1263
Robert, occurs 1275
Henry, occurs 1291
Walter, elected 1294
Philip, occurs 1294
Henry, elected 1301, occurs 1314
Henry, occurs 1385
John de Toft, occurs 1390
Philip Malteby, occurs 1415
Thomas, (Stickney) occurs 1504-32
Robert Styk or Banbury, occurs 1536
John, occurs 1537

=== Burials ===
- Hawise de Reviers, sister of Baldwin de Redvers, 1st Earl of Devon (Reviers)
- William (Helie) de Roumare, 2nd Earl of Lincoln

== History after dissolution ==
After dissolution the former abbey passed through various hands. It was in the hands of Charles Brandon, 1st Duke of Suffolk, at the time of his death in 1545. From Brandon it passed to John Carsley and then to his son Francis Carsley. The former monastic estate was sold to William Cecil, 1st Baron Burghley, in 1575. It then passed through his family to his son: the 1st Earl of Exeter; and grandson: the 2nd Earl of Exeter. Through the marriage of the 2nd Earl's daughter, Lady Elizabeth Cecil, the estate passed to Thomas Howard, 1st Earl of Berkshire, and then to their third son, Henry Howard (a playwright). Following Henry's death, the estate passed to his nephew Craven Howard (d.1700; son of Henry's brother Thomas and father of Henry Howard, 11th Earl of Suffolk).

Nothing of the abbey is visible today which was to the SW of the present house and the village of Revesby. Excavations undertaken in 1869 only located the abbey church and cloister. In 1870 the skeletons of several monks were found. Earthworks indicate the extent of the abbey precinct, and reveal the location of 3 rectangular fishponds.

=== Country house ===
The site of the former abbey was, like many others, developed into a country house. Craven Howard (d. 1700) built a new residential house at the former abbey, although not on top of the former monastic remains. This new house and estate passed to Craven's son Henry Howard, 11th Earl of Suffolk.

Earl of Berkshire's Estate Act 1710
- Act of Parliament
- Parliament of Great Britain
- Long title: An Act for Sale of the Manor of Reaversby, and other Lands, in the County of Lincoln, the Estate of Henry Bowes Earl of Berkshire; and to settle other Lands, in the County of Stafford, to the same Uses.
- Citation: 9 Ann. c. 5 Pr.
- Territorial extent: Great Britain

Dates
- Royal assent: 26 March 1711
- Commencement: 25 November 1710 (Note: Start of session.)

Status: Current legislation

In 1711 Henry sold the house and 2,000-acre estate for £14,000 (equivalent to £2.3 million in 2025). The purchaser was Joseph Banks I, who established his son Joseph Banks II at the house. Henry required a private act of Parliament, the Earl of Berkshire's Estate Act 1710 (9 Ann. c. 5 Pr.), to sell the house, as it was tied to him and his children as "part of his marriage settlement". The purchase price was described as "evidently cheap", as the estate had an annual income of around £900. Revesby and the rest of Joseph Banks' possessions officially passed to his son with his death. Although Joseph II had lived primarily at Revesby during his father's lifetime, after his death, Joseph II spent little time there.

The grounds were extensively landscaped in the mid-18th century, and in the late 18th century the house was home to the botanist Sir Joseph Banks, who sailed with Captain Cook. Banks died in 1820 and the house was inherited by his first cousin once removed, Hon. James Hamilton Stanhope who died by suicide in 1825, leaving the house to his minor son James Banks Stanhope.

Revesby Abbey was later completely rebuilt in 1845 in the Jacobethan style, by architect William Burn, for James Banks Stanhope. It appears the house was totally built and furnished from scratch, as the contents of the previous house, including furniture, paintings and curtains, were auctioned in 1843. The timber, cornices and fittings were also auctioned in 1844. Although the sub-basement for the current house is built with bricks much older than the house and so it is believed are the bricks from Craven Howard's house.

In 1977 the then owner applied for permission to demolish the house which was initially refused. Advised by the council to apply again, she did not do so. In 1987 English Heritage used section 101 of the Town and Country Planning Act 1971 (c. 78) to conduct "urgent works which the owner is unwilling to do". The Secretary of State had the power to reclaim the costs of the building work from the owner, and the following year the house was sold. Its "remaining contents" were sold in 1953.

The house is Grade I listed and was recorded on the 2023 Heritage at Risk Register issued annually by Historic England. The register recorded that, although some progress had been made in relation to the repair and renovation of the stable block, the condition of the main house remained "very bad" and that it was at "serious risk".

== Bibliography ==
- The Cistercian Abbeys of Britain, ed David Robinson, Batsford 1998
- A History of the County of Lincolnshire: Volume II, The Victoria County History 1906
