= Revesby =

Revesby can mean the following places :-

- Revesby, New South Wales, a suburb in the City of Bankstown, Australia
- Revesby, Lincolnshire, a civil parish in the East Lindsey district of Lincolnshire, England
  - Revesby Abbey, a Cistercian monastery located near the village
