= Hameringham =

Extended village in the East Lindsey district of Lincolnshire, England

Coordinates: 53.186133°N 0.040222°W

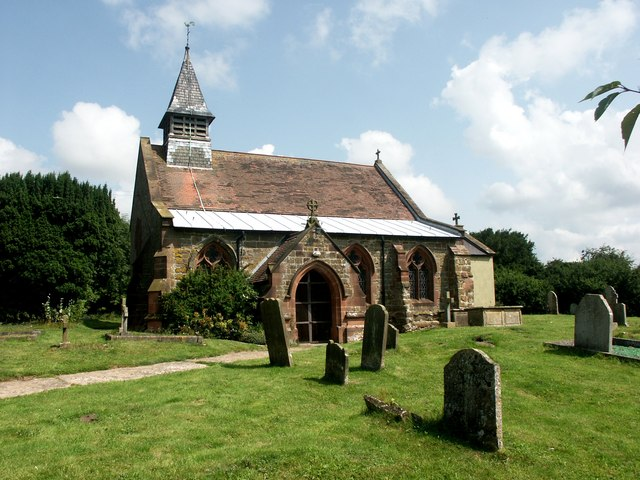
- All Saints' Church, Hameringham

- Location within Lincolnshire
- OS grid reference: TF310672
  - London: 115 mi (185 km) S
- District: East Lindsey
- Shire county: Lincolnshire
- Region: East Midlands
- Country: England
- Sovereign state: United Kingdom
- Post town: Horncastle
- Postcode district: LN9
- Police: Lincolnshire
- Fire: Lincolnshire
- Ambulance: East Midlands
- UK Parliament: Louth and Horncastle

Hameringham is an extended village in the East Lindsey district of Lincolnshire, England. It is situated 4 miles (6.4 km) south-east from the town of Horncastle, and consists of High Hameringham and Low Hammeringham. It is in the civil parish of Lusby with Winceby.

The parish church is dedicated to All Saints, and is a Grade II listed building dating from the year 1200, although heavily restored in 1893 by Hodgson Fowler after the nave collapsed. It is made from greenstone, brick, limestone and red sandstone.

Hameringham belongs to the Fen and Hill Group of Parishes which also includes:

- Mareham le Fen, St Helen
- Mareham on the Hill, All Saints
- Revesby, St Lawrence
- Scrivelsby, St Benedict
- Wilksby, All Saints

The Thatched Cottage is a Grade II listed late 18th-century mud and stud thatched cottage.

Dunsthorpe is a deserted medieval village which was located near the present Hameringham Grange. The church was in ruins by 1421 and in 1437-08 the parishes were united to become Hameringham. Bones have been found here.
