= Claxby with Moorby =

Civil parish in Lincolnshire, England

Coordinates: 53.157°N 0.069°W

- Civil parish
- Former Methodist Chapel, Moorby Former site of Claxby Pluckacre Moorby Roadside Nature Reserve Revesby reservoir

- Location within Lincolnshire
- Interactive map of Claxby with Moorby
- Area: 2.57 sq mi (6.7 km^{2})
- Population: 56 (2021)
  - Density: 22/sq mi (8.5/km^{2})
- OS grid reference: TF292640
- District: East Lindsey
- Shire county: Lincolnshire
- Region: East Midlands
- Country: England
- Sovereign state: United Kingdom
- Settlements: Moorby
- Post town: BOSTON
- Postcode district: PE22
- Dialling code: 01507
- Police: Lincolnshire
- Fire: Lincolnshire
- Ambulance: East Midlands
- UK Parliament: Louth and Horncastle

Claxby with Moorby is a sparsely populated civil parish located in the East Lindsey district of Lincolnshire, England. It lies approximately 4 miles (6.4 km) south-east of Horncastle and comprises the small village of Moorby together with the site of the deserted medieval village of Claxby Pluckacre. The modern civil parish was formed on 1 April 1987 by the merger of the former parishes of Moorby and Claxby Pluckacre. There were 56 residents reported at the 2021 census throughout the parish.

== Geography ==
The parish occupies low-lying agricultural land on the edge of the Lincolnshire Wolds, drained by small watercourses. Moorby is a compact linear settlement on the B1183; Claxby Pluckacre consists largely of earthworks and scattered farms reached by a gated road.

The landscape is predominantly arable farmland with limited woodland. The lowest region is along the boundary to the west, at approximately 28 metres (92 ft), The highest location is by Hameringham Hill to the north of the parish boundary at 84 metres (276 ft).

There is a Roadside Nature Reserve at Moorby managed by the Lincolnshire Wildlife Trust. Watercourses form much of the western and southern boundary, including Haltham and Miningsby becks, the latter flowing into the Revesby reservoir in the south east corner of the parish.

== History ==
=== Toponymy ===
Moorby derives from the Old Norse mór + bý, meaning “farmstead or village on the moor”. Claxby (Pluckacre) is thought to incorporate the Old Danish personal name Klak + bý (“Klak’s farmstead”), with the later addition “Pluckacre” distinguishing it from other Lincolnshire places named Claxby.

=== Events ===
Prehistoric artefacts include flint pieces and cropmarks found near Claxby Pluckacre. Moorby is recorded in the Domesday Book of 1086 as “Morebi” in the Horncastle Hundred (Lindsey South Riding). Claxby Pluckacre is also listed in Domesday.

Claxby Pluckacre is a classic deserted medieval village whose earthworks (tofts, hollow-ways, ridge-and-furrow and the site of the former church) survive and have been recorded from aerial photography and ground survey. Medieval and later agricultural features, including ridge-and-furrow, are visible across the parish. Limited prehistoric and Romano-British material has been noted in the wider locality.

Dunsthorpe near Hameringham Hill to the north was also a former medieval village whose area overlapped into the parish. It was first mentioned in 1316, but its church was by 1421 in ruins and the then parishes of Dunsthorpe and Hameringham merged in 1437 due to a lack of locals. It's also thought Moorby was larger in medieval times but shrunk to its current size.

Both settlements had churches in the medieval period. The church at Claxby Pluckacre (St Andrew) fell into ruin and collapsed in 1748; the last priest was instituted in the 1660s. Revesby reservoir was built on the Revesby Abbey estate in the 1860s to supply water to Boston; it reverted to a fisheries-only lake in 1980.

A Methodist church was built in 1848 and a national school opened in 1855, in Moorby, both closed in the later 20th century. World War II prisoner-of-war working camp existed near Moorby and was later used as a poultry farm. Moorby’s church (All Saints) was demolished in 1983. The two ancient parishes remained separate until their formal amalgamation in 1987. The Revesby estate continues to own properties and land within the parish.

== Governance ==
The parish is administered by a parish meeting rather than a full parish council, reflecting its very small population. It forms part of the Horncastle district ward, the Horncastle and The Keals council electoral division and the Louth and Horncastle parliamentary constituency. Historically, the settlements lay in the Horncastle wapentake / Soke in the Parts of Lindsey.

== Demographics ==
The parish is one of the least populous in East Lindsey. Census figures for 2021 show 56 residents.

== Economy ==
The economy is almost entirely agricultural, focused on arable farming and associated farm businesses. There is one small commercial premises for small firms owned by the Revesby estate within the parish; there are some residence-based businesses; locals travel to Horncastle or other nearby towns for shopping, employment and amenities. Occasional holiday lets and farm diversification exist on a small scale.

== Landmarks ==
There are two Grade II listed residences currently standing within the parish boundaries. Other heritage assets are the earthwork remains of the deserted medieval villages of Claxby Pluckacre (including the site of St Andrew’s Church), Moorby and Dunsthorpe, and the sites of former churches and associated burial grounds. Nineteenth-century farmsteads such as Hall Farm survive as vernacular agricultural complexes.

== Transport ==
The parish is served by the B1183 which runs through Moorby and minor lanes (some gated). There is no public transport of note and no railway station; the nearest services are at Horncastle or further afield.

== Community ==
Community facilities are minimal. There is no village hall, school or active parish church within the parish. Residents use churches, schools and services in neighbouring villages (particularly Wilksby, Wood Enderby and Horncastle).
