= Robert Lilley =

Robert Lilley may refer to:

- Robert D. Lilley (general) (1836–1886), Confederate brigadier general during the American Civil War
- Robert D. Lilley (businessman), American businessman, president of AT&T, 1972–1976
- Bob Lilley (soccer, born 1966), American soccer coach
- Bob Lilley (footballer, born 1893) (1893–1964), English footballer

== See also ==
- Bob Lilley (disambiguation)
