= Moorby =

Village in Lincolnshire, England

Coordinates: 53.15749°N 0.06856°W

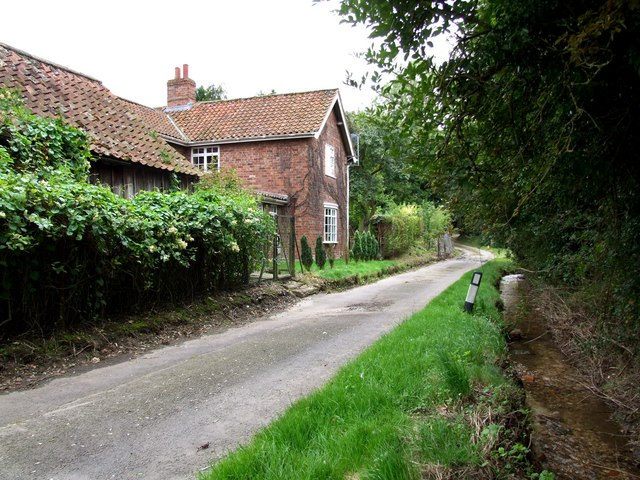
- The brook at Moorby

- Location within Lincolnshire
- Population: 50 (2001)
- OS grid reference: TF292640
  - London: 115 mi (185 km) S
- Civil parish: Claxby with Moorby
- District: East Lindsey
- Shire county: Lincolnshire
- Region: East Midlands
- Country: England
- Sovereign state: United Kingdom
- Post town: BOSTON
- Postcode district: PE22
- Dialling code: 01507
- Police: Lincolnshire
- Fire: Lincolnshire
- Ambulance: East Midlands

Moorby is a small village and former civil parish, now in the parish of Claxby with Moorby, in the East Lindsey district of Lincolnshire, England. The village is situated 4 miles (6 km) south-east from Horncastle and 1 mile (1.6 km) east from Wood Enderby. Moorby has a population of about 50 inhabitants.

== History ==
According to Mills, Moorby derives from the Old Norse for 'mór' plus 'bý', a "farmstead or village in the moor".

Moorby is listed in the 1086 Domesday Book as "Morebi", in the Horncastle Hundred of Lindsey South Riding. The village contained 18 households, 10 smallholders, 8 freemen, a meadow of 240 acres (0.97 km^{2}), woodland of 6 acres (0.02 km^{2}), and a church. In 1066 Queen Edith held the Lordship, which in 1086 was transferred to William I as Lord of the manor and Tenant-in-chief.

In 1885 Kelly's noted Moorby as a village with a Wesleyan chapel, and a school, founded 1856, for children of the parishes of Moorby, Wilksby, Claxby Pluckacre, and Wood Enderby. The school was supported by voluntary contributions and held 70 pupils, with an average attendance of 40. Parish soil was described as heavy loam with a subsoil of white clay, on which were grown wheat, barley, seeds and turnips. Parish population in 1881 was 98. Moorby occupations included four farmers, a wheelwright who was also a beer retailer, a blacksmith, and a farm bailiff.

A church, dedicated to All Saints, was demolished in the 1980s Kelly's (1885) notes the church as a small structure in Early English style, constructed of Ancaster stone with brick bands, and comprising a chancel, nave and vestry, a north porch, and a small square tower with one bell and a spire. The arcade was of three arches, the reredos of carved stone and encaustic tile, and the pulpit of Caen stone. The parish registers dated from 1561, and included those of Claxby Pluckacre. The living was a rectory and 14 acres (0.06 km^{2}) of glebe land at Wildmoor Fen. The Shell Guide to Lincolnshire describes Moorby church as being "much restored by James Fowler in 1866, but he left a large and very early font". In 1964 Pevsner noted a square font that included images of a virgin, sun and moon, kneeling and seated figures, a cadaver, and an angel. The vestry held a 16th-century stone panel with the image of a man playing bagpipes and two dancing figures. A 1712 paten by John Stocker also existed.

Moorby was 'a Great War landing ground' for the RAF.

The village contains remains of POW Camp 79. The camp was a standard Second World War working camp for German soldiers. It was later used as a poultry farm.

In 1961 the civil parish had a population of 50. On 1 April 1987 the parish was abolished and merged with Claxby Pluckacre to form "Claxby with Moorby".

== Community ==
Most local gatherings in the village take place in the village hall, a Rural Education Centre on Cooks Farm (including village council meetings and the annual Harvest Supper, which residents of Wilksby also attend) or on the village green, a small grassy area on the site of an old farmyard, probably owned by the nearby Scrivelsby estate. Church services are held in Wilksby church (built by the Stanhope family at a cost of £99) every third Sunday in the month.

Village buildings include 12 houses, including the Old Rectory, the Old School House, and the Royal Oak, no longer a licensed premises. A Methodist chapel still stands but is now outhouses for a private residence. The village is also home to Oslinc, a farm where ostriches are reared for meat, eggs, and feathers.

== Media ==
On New Year's Eve 2002 a farm at Moorby was taken-over by 70 people for an illegal rave, causing damage and fires. The farmer complained that Lincolnshire Police took no eviction action after sending two officers to investigate. The police stated that "officers could only intervene to break up rave parties if certain criteria were met".
