= Wilksby =

Hamlet in the East Lindsey district of Lincolnshire

Coordinates: 53.148°N 0.082°W

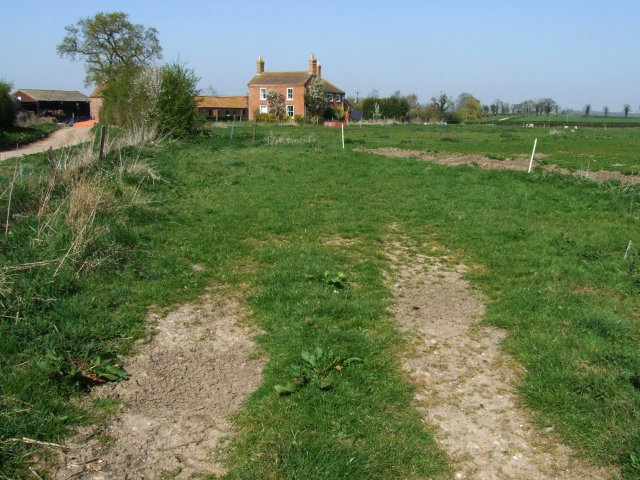
- Manor Farm

- Location within Lincolnshire
- Civil parish: Wood Enderby
- District: East Lindsey
- Shire county: Lincolnshire
- Region: East Midlands
- Country: England
- Sovereign state: United Kingdom

Wilksby is a hamlet in the civil parish of Wood Enderby, in the East Lindsey district of Lincolnshire. A former civil parish in itself, it was merged with the parish of Wood Enderby in 1936.

== History ==
Wilksby was mentioned in Domesday Book of 1086 as "Wilchesbi", with the Lord of the Manor being William I. The name is derived from the Old Norse "Vilgeirr's/Vilgerth's" + "by", meaning the farmstead of Vilgeirr/Vilgerth.

In 1931 the parish had a population of 30. On 1 April 1936 the parish was abolished and merged with Wood Enderby.

=== Church ===
The church is dedicated to All Saints, though it may once have been St Mary, and is Grade II listed. Built of greenstone and red brick, It was renovated in 1895.

A church has known to have been on the site for at least 800 years, with the first recorded rector was Simon de Tynton in 1230. The stone font dates from the reign of King John (1166-1216), with the earliest written records from the church from 1563.

== Geography ==
Wilksby lies in the foothills of the Lincolnshire Wolds, an area of limestone and sandstone hills forming the highest ground between Yorkshire and Kent. The village itself is in the valley of Mareham Beck at about 25–30 m above sea level, whilst the church sits atop the hill to the north of the village.

The roads leading to and from the north and east of the village are wide, suggesting their use as ancient droving tracks.
