= Barlings Chronicle =

The Barlings Chronicle is an important late 13th or early 14th century Latin chronicle from the Premonstratensian Barlings Abbey in Lincolnshire, England. It is closely related to the Hagnaby Chronicle.
