= Claxby =

Claxby may refer to the following places in Lincolnshire, England:

- Claxby by Normanby, West Lindsey
- Claxby St Andrew, East Lindsey
- Claxby Pluckacre, East Lindsey
