= Stixwould =

Village in Lincolnshire, England

Coordinates: 53.177974°N 0.24375°W

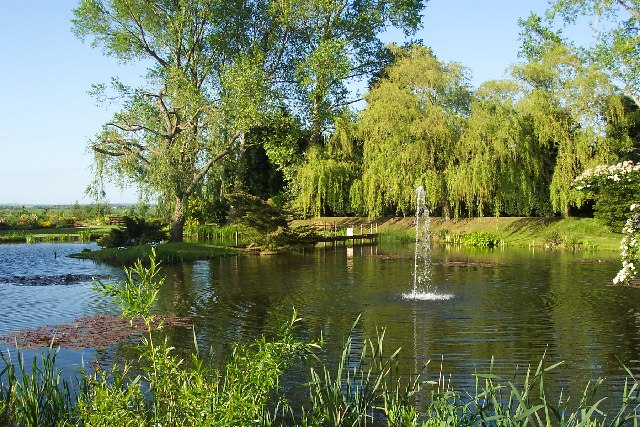
- Pond at Stixwould

- Location within Lincolnshire
- OS grid reference: TF174659
  - London: 120 mi (190 km) S
- Civil parish: Stixwould and Woodhall
- District: East Lindsey
- Shire county: Lincolnshire
- Region: East Midlands
- Country: England
- Sovereign state: United Kingdom
- Post town: WOODHALL SPA
- Postcode district: LN10
- Dialling code: 01526
- Police: Lincolnshire
- Fire: Lincolnshire
- Ambulance: East Midlands
- UK Parliament: Louth and Horncastle

Stixwould is a small village in the civil parish of Stixwould and Woodhall, in the East Lindsey district of Lincolnshire, England.

== Geography ==
The village is situated 13 miles (21 km) east from Lincoln and 2 miles (3.2 km) north-east from the large village of Woodhall Spa. The River Witham runs a little over a mile to the west of the village which lies on the southern end of the Lincolnshire Limewoods.

Stixwould lies on a finger of higher ground on the edge of the Witham fenland, bordered to the north by the Catchwater Drain and to the south by Reeds Beck.

The historic parish of Stixwould contains numerous woodlands most notable of which are Stixwould Wood to the north-west, Halstead Wood to the west and Long Wood to the south.

Nowadays the ancient parish has been adjoined with the parish of Woodhall to form the parish of Stixwould and Woodhall with a combined population of 255 in 2011.

== History ==
Stixwould's name originates from the Old English Stigr and wald meaning Stigr's forest or wood, appearing in the 1086 Domesday Book as Stigeswalde.

Major John Edward Almonds, a founding member of the SAS, was from Stixwould.

In 1971 the civil parish had a population of 123. On 1 April 1987 the parish was abolished and merged with Woodhall to form "Stixwould and Woodhall".

=== Medieval ===
Stixwould is recorded in the Domesday Book as having twenty-one households in 1066.

To the south of the village is an area of ridge and furrow field systems.

=== Nunnery ===
Stixwould Priory, as it is now commonly known, was a Cistercian nunnery founded in the twelfth century and dedicated to St. Mary. It was dissolved in 1536. Almost immediately after its founding it was refounded in the Benedictine order and by 1537 was of the Premonstratensian, before being finally suppressed in 1539.

After the Dissolution of the Monasteries in 1540 the property was given to Robert Dighton.

The earthwork remains of the nunnery and associated fishponds are still visible.

It was one of a number of monastic buildings along the sides of the Witham valley south of Lincoln. To its north is Tupholme Abbey and to the south is Kirkstead Abbey.

=== Stixwould Ferry ===
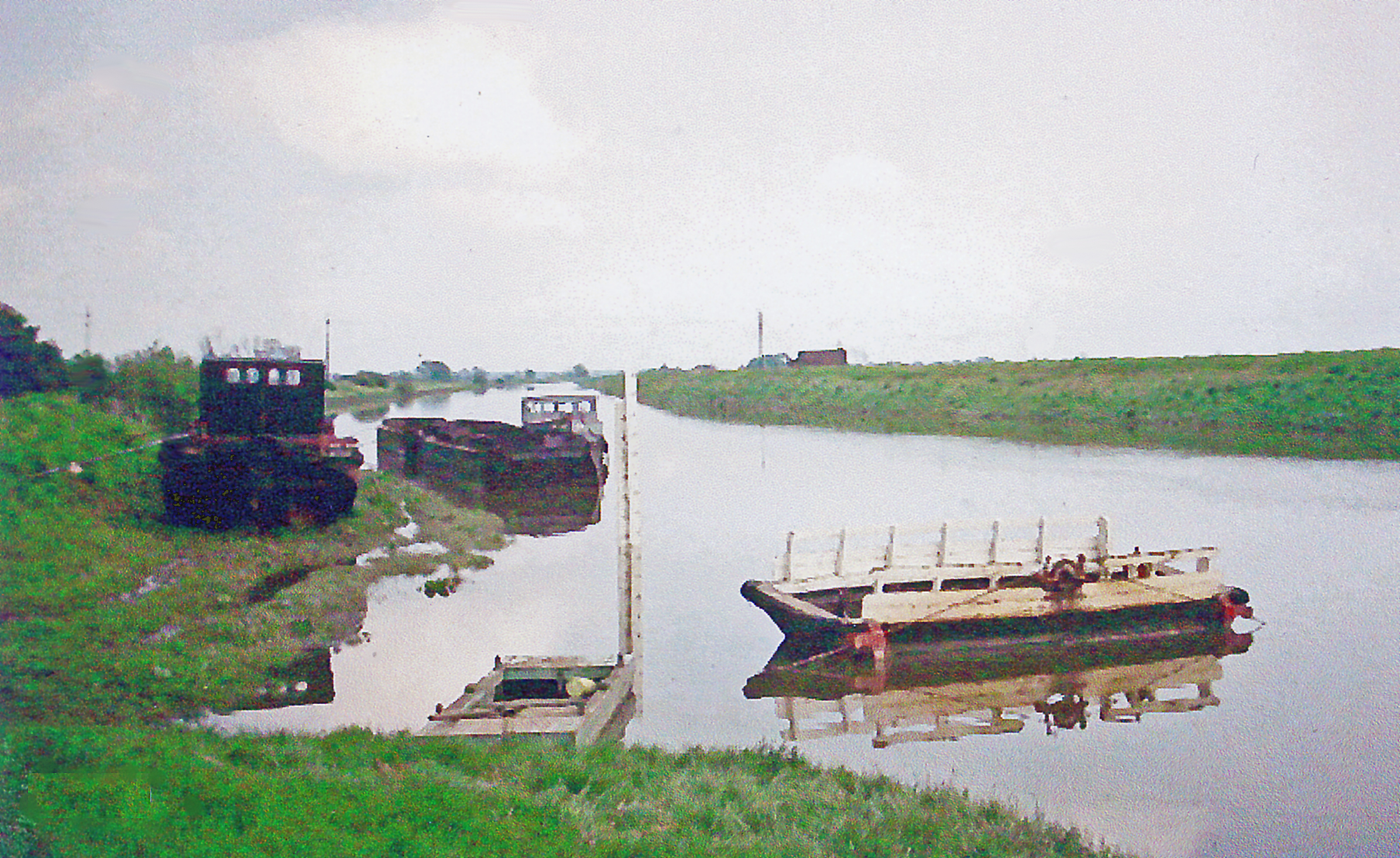
Stixwould Ferry in May 1967

A ferry operated across the Witham on the site of the now disused railway station from the middle of the nineteenth century until the middle of the twentieth. It was purchased by Kesteven Council in 1937.

=== Railway ===
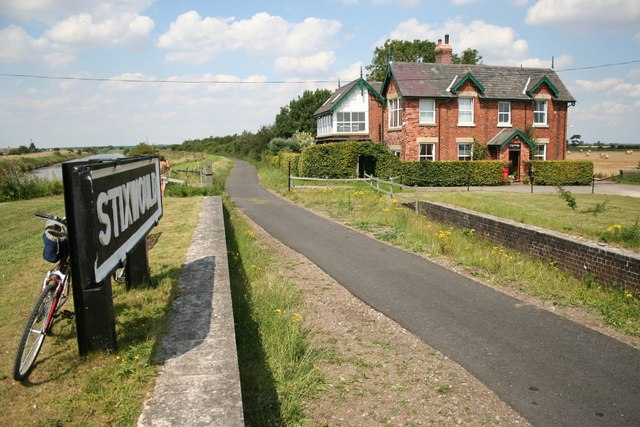
Stixwould railway station and Signalbox

In 1846 the Great Northern railway company purchased the land to build a 58 miles (93 km) rail link from Peterborough to Lincoln along the banks of the River Witham. Works commenced in 1847 and the line opened on 17 October 1848 along with Stixwould station one mile to the west of the village. The station was closed on 5 October 1970 and the station building is now a private residence. The Water Rail Way, part of the National Cycle Network (Route 1) managed by Sustrans, now runs along the course of the tracks.

=== School ===
A school was built in 1851 and enlarged in 1894.

=== Church ===
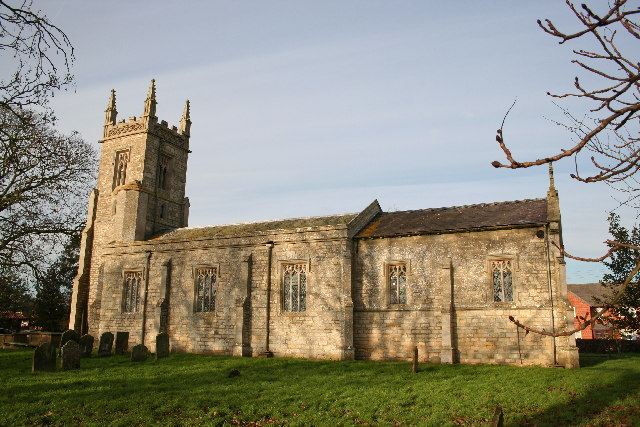
St Peter's Church, Stixwould

The parish church is a Grade II listed building dedicated to Saint Peter, rebuilt in 1831 by Christopher Turner. The font dates from the 16th century. A 13th-century grave slab, found on the site of Stixwould Abbey, leans against north side of the church tower. There is also a 14th-century churchyard cross in the graveyard. Alice Cranmer, the sister of Archbishop Thomas Cranmer, was a nun at Stixwould and its sacristan by 1525. She played a crucial role in his spiritual uncertainties whilst awaiting execution in Oxford, but ultimately he rejected the Catholic view she espoused.

=== Abbey Farm ===
Abbey Farm lies to the west of the village occupying the site of the now lost priory. The farmhouse dates from the early seventeenth century, though incorporates materials much older into the construction.
