= Hagnaby Chronicle =

Latin chronicle

The Hagnaby Chronicle is an important late 13th or early 14th century Latin chronicle from the Premonstratensian Hagnaby Abbey in Lincolnshire, England. It is closely related to the Barlings Chronicle.
