= North Ormsby Priory =

Gilbertine priory in Lincolnshire, England

Coordinates: 53.419008°N 0.06488°W

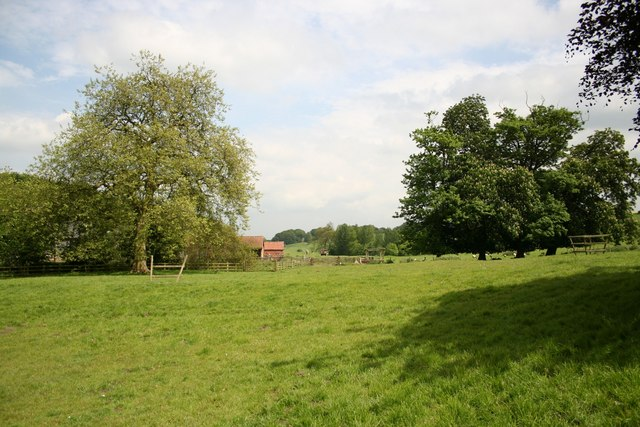
North Ormsby Priory site

North Ormsby Priory was a Gilbertine priory in North Ormsby, Lincolnshire, England.

It was founded by Gilbert son of Robert of Ormsby with the consent of his lord, William, earl of Albemarle. Robert was steward of William of Percy and gave the nuns the churches of Sth Elkington and Little Grimsby pasture, and land. The number of inmates was limited by Saint Gilbert to 100 nuns and lay sisters, and 50 canons and lay brothers. In 1534 the prior subscribed to the kings supremacy, and the house was surrendered by the prior and 5 canons and 9 nuns in 1538. The last prior was Christopher Cartwright. The site is still visible as earthworks and is scheduled.
