= Bob Lilley =

Bob Lilley may refer to:

- Bob Lilley (soccer, born 1966) (born 1966), American soccer coach and former player
- Bob Lilley (footballer, born 1893) (1893–1964), English footballer
- Bob Lilley (British Army soldier) (1914–1981), founding member of the British Special Air Service

== See also ==
- Bob Lilly (born 1939), former American football defensive tackle and photographer
