= Claxby Pluckacre =

Hamlet in the East Lindsey district of Lincolnshire, England

Coordinates: 53.160995°N 0.049599°W

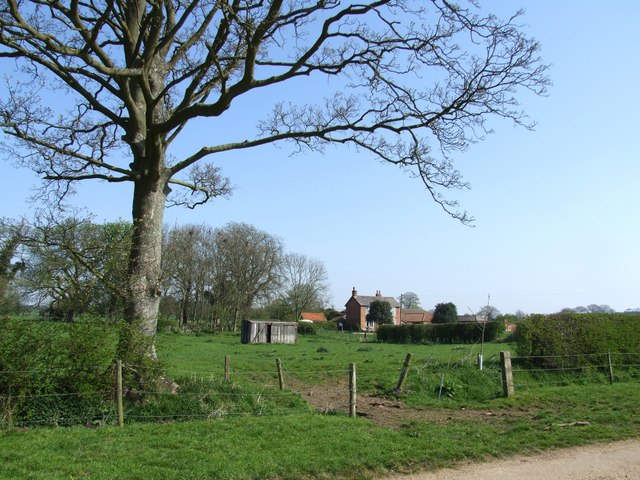
- Hall Farm, Claxby Pluckacre

- Location within Lincolnshire
- OS grid reference: TF304644
  - London: 115 mi (185 km) S
- Civil parish: Claxby with Moorby
- District: East Lindsey
- Shire county: Lincolnshire
- Region: East Midlands
- Country: England
- Sovereign state: United Kingdom
- Post town: Boston
- Postcode district: PE22
- Police: Lincolnshire
- Fire: Lincolnshire
- Ambulance: East Midlands
- UK Parliament: Louth and Horncastle

Claxby Pluckacre is a hamlet in the civil parish of Claxby with Moorby, in the East Lindsey district of Lincolnshire, England. It is situated approximately 5 miles (8.0 km) south-east from the town of Horncastle. In 1971 the parish had a population of 14. On 1 April 1987 the parish was abolished and merged with Moorby to form "Claxby with Moorby".

Whilst Claxby Pluckacre is listed in the 1086 Domesday Book, today it is considered a deserted medieval village with slight earthworks visible between Hall Farm and The Grange.

Claxby Pluckacre once had a church dedicated to Saint Andrew, which fell down in 1748 and was never rebuilt. The last priest was instituted 1660–62. Whilst nothing remains it can be seen as earthworks.

Each year, in July, there is an annual pilgrimage to the site of St Andrew's Church. The Mareham le Fen Victory Silver Band provides the music for a service which commemorates the over 250 villages and hamlets lost in Lincolnshire over the past four centuries.
