= Bob Lilley (British Army soldier) =

British Army soldier

- Sergeant Bob Lilley in the Libyan desert, 1941
- Born: Ernest Thomas Lilley; 10 February 1914; Wolverhampton, West Midlands, England
- Died: 14 August 1981 (aged 67); Folkestone, Kent, England
- Military career
- Allegiance: United Kingdom
- Branch: British Army
- Service years: 1939–1958
- Rank: Warrant Officer Class I
- Units: Coldstream Guards; South Staffordshire Regiment; Special Air Service
- Conflicts: Second World War; North African Campaign; Malayan Emergency
- Awards: Military Medal; British Empire Medal; Mentioned in Despatches (2)

Ernest Thomas "Bob" Lilley, MM, BEM (10 February 1914 – 14 August 1981) was a British Army soldier. A founding member of the Special Air Service, he formerly served with the Coldstream Guards. Lilley was one of the first four men selected by Colonel David Stirling to comprise L Detachment 1st S.A.S. in Middle East Headquarters at Cairo in 1940. He took part in many operations behind enemy lines in Libya against Italian and German forces during the Second World War.

== Military career ==
Lilley was born at Wolverhampton on 10 February 1914. During the Second World War he enlisted into the Coldstream Guards in September 1940 and was one of the founding members of 'L' Detachment, having joined from No. 8 Commando in September 1941, as one of the Tobruk Four (the others being Pat Riley, Jim Almonds, and Jim Blakeney) under officer Lieutenant Jock Lewes, who was killed in December the same year and of whom David Stirling later wrote: "Jock could far more genuinely claim to be the founder of the S.A.S. than I." Prior to joining 'L' Detachment, Sergeant Lilley along with Jock Lewes was seconded to Layforce and took part in operations. Subsequently, when Layforce was disbanded Lilley was attached to 30 Commando and thereafter selected along with Lewis by David Stirling to become part of 'L' Detachment.

Lilley took part in many operations and missions in North Africa but perhaps his most acclaimed operation was on the return from a hit and run mission in 1941. Lilley was in a truck with Jock Lewes and David Stirling. Lilley suddenly yelled out for everyone to jump out of the LRDG Chevrolet truck. Lilley had smelled burning and realised that one of the timers pencils in the explosive bombs had activated. Mere seconds after they scrambled out, the truck blew up. Lilley by his quick reaction had saved their lives.

Lilley won the Military Medal in November 1942, for his heroism during a daring raid. In the recommendation for the award, Stirling wrote:

Lance Sergeant Ernest Thomas Lilley, 'L’ Det S.A.S. Bde (Coldstream Guards). This NCO was cut off and captured by the enemy when returning from a raid on Berka Aerodrome, in May 1942. Although completely unarmed he subsequently managed to surprise and strangle his guard and to return by himself to the RV. He has distinguished himself by great coolness and calmness in other raids.

Lilley was a member of the British Commando team who were parachuted into Norway to destroy the heavy water facility. On completion of the mission he returned from Norway back to the UK by submarine. Lilley later received a certificate of thanks from the King Olav of Norway in December 1945. Lilley was also twice Mentioned in Despatches, the first in January 1944.

Post-war, Lilley continued to serve with the SAS, including at least two operational tours in Malaya, his parent unit changing to the South Staffordshire Regiment. Prior to taking his discharge in 1958 he served seven years with 21 Special Air Service Regiment. In 1950 he was appointed Regimental Sergeant Major of 21 Special Air Service Regiment and was awarded the British Empire Medal for his services in 1952. In August 1951, Lieutenant Colonel Augustus Newman, commanding officer of the 21st S.A.S. Regiment, wrote:

RSM Lilley was appointed RSM of this unit in September 1950 and for some considerable time before his appointment was carrying out the duties of acting RSM under difficult circumstances in connection with his taking over the appointment. He weathered this period in an extremely resourceful manner.

RSM Lilley has served with SAS troops since they were first formed in 1941. He has a very distinguished war record and was awarded the Military Medal for outstanding bravery in the field, by this outstanding example he has contributed to a very great extent to the reputation earned by SAS troops during the war.

His name is legendary throughout the Regiment and since taking over RSM of 21st SAS Regiment, his qualities of tact, understanding and unswervable loyalty combined with firmness, have been invaluable in a unit combining the SAS role with the previous traditions of the Artists Rifles and containing ranks representative not only of all corps of the Army but of other services and other countries and including a high proportion of ex officers.

He has carried out the difficult job of RSM to a TA unit magnificently and continues to be an example to all ranks. I strongly recommend that he be awarded the BEM for his outstanding services to the Regiment.

In Special Forces circles, the term boblilley refers to a commando hit-and-run operation.

== Later life ==
After his service Lilley retired to Folkestone, Kent and set up a Guest house where many of his old SAS comrades would come and enjoy spending many a happy weekend reminiscing. Lilley died in August 1981 at the age of 67 in Folkestone, Kent. His funeral on 21 August 1981 was attended by Colonel David Stirling and other surviving notables from the SAS originals of 'L' Detachment 1st SAS.
