= Thoresby =

Thoresby may refer to:

- John Thoresby (disambiguation)
- Ralph Thoresby
- North Thoresby, Lincolnshire
- South Thoresby, Lincolnshire
- Thoresby, Nottinghamshire
- Thoresby Colliery
- Thoresby Hall
- Thoresby Society
