= Hagnaby Abbey =

Former monastery in Lincolnshire, England

Coordinates: 53.301700°N 0.227601°E

Hagnaby Abbey was an abbey and former priory in Hagnaby, Lincolnshire, England. It was one of nine Premonstratensian houses within the historical county.

It was founded as a house for Premonstratensian canons around 1175, by Agnes, widow of Herbert de Orreby. The priory was a dependency of Welbeck Abbey and named in honour of Saint Thomas the Martyr.

It achieved its independence and abbey status in 1250, and appears from surviving records to have been well run.

Hagnaby Abbey was suppressed in 1536, its last abbot being Edmund Toft. It is an ancient scheduled monument.

== See also ==
- Hagnaby Chronicle
