= Waddingham =

Village and civil parish in Lincolnshire, England

Coordinates: 53.453234°N 0.519252°W

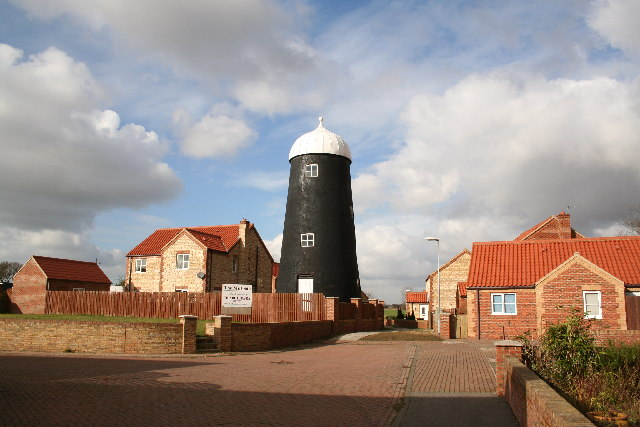
- Andersons mill, Waddingham

- Location within Lincolnshire
- Population: 601 (2011)
- OS grid reference: SK984961
  - London: 145 mi (233 km) S
- District: West Lindsey
- Shire county: Lincolnshire
- Region: East Midlands
- Country: England
- Sovereign state: United Kingdom
- Post town: GAINSBOROUGH
- Postcode district: DN21
- Police: Lincolnshire
- Fire: Lincolnshire
- Ambulance: East Midlands
- UK Parliament: Gainsborough (UK Parliament constituency)

Waddingham is a village and civil parish in the West Lindsey district of Lincolnshire, England. It is geographically situated 1.5 miles (2.4 km) to the east of the A15 road, 10 miles (16 km) south-east from Scunthorpe and 16 miles (26 km) north from Lincoln. According to the United Kingdom Census 2001 Waddingham (including Brandy Wharf) had a population of 548; by the time of the United Kingdom Census 2011, the population had increased to 601.

== History ==
Originally there were two settlements, Stainton (where the present church is) and Wadingham, which were on either side of the Waddingham Beck which runs through the village. Both settlements are mentioned in the Domesday Book of 1086. Both places have Anglo Saxon names: Stainton is derived from The Old English "Stan" (stone), and the Old English "Tun" (farm), meaning stony farm. Waddingham is derived from two common OE suffixes: "ing" (person), or "ingas" (people), and "ham" (village or settlement), meaning the village of, or belonging to, the Wada family or tribe.

Church of St Mary and St Peter, Waddingham

The Church of St Mary and St Peter, Waddingham (originally St Peter) church chancel arch is 13th-century, the tower being a 15th-century addition. The church was largely rebuilt in 1862.

== Culture and community ==
Waddingham had a post office and village shop, which closed in late August 2022, and a Methodist chapel. Opposite the Jubilee Hall (built to commemorate HM Queen Elizabeth II's Silver Jubilee in 1977) is Waddingham Primary School. The village public house is now closed.

== Sources ==
- Mills, A.D. (2011) [first published 1991]. A Dictionary of British Place Names (First edition revised 2011 ed.). Oxford: Oxford University Press. ISBN 9780199609086.
