= John Thoresby =

John Thoresby may refer to:

- John of Thoresby, English clergyman and politician
- John Thoresby (burgess), member of parliament for Great Grimsby
