= Broxholme =

Village and civil parish in the West Lindsey district of Lincolnshire, England

Coordinates: 53.293140°N 0.636874°W

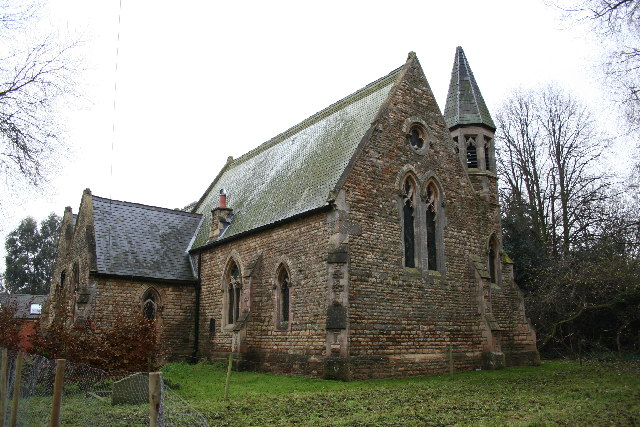
- Church of All Saints, Broxholme

- Location within Lincolnshire
- OS grid reference: SK909782
  - London: 125 mi (201 km) S
- District: West Lindsey
- Shire county: Lincolnshire
- Region: East Midlands
- Country: England
- Sovereign state: United Kingdom
- Post town: Lincoln
- Postcode district: LN1
- Police: Lincolnshire
- Fire: Lincolnshire
- Ambulance: East Midlands
- UK Parliament: Gainsborough

Broxholme is a village and civil parish in the West Lindsey district of Lincolnshire, England. The village is situated approximately 6 miles (10 km) north-west from the city and county town of Lincoln. According to the 2001 census, Broxholme had a population of 58. At the 2011 census the population remained less than 100 and was included in the civil parish of South Carlton.

Broxholme Grade II listed Anglican parish church is dedicated to All Saints. It was rebuilt in 1857.
