= Old Woodhall =

Village in Lincolnshire, England

Coordinates: 53.194165°N 0.175505°W

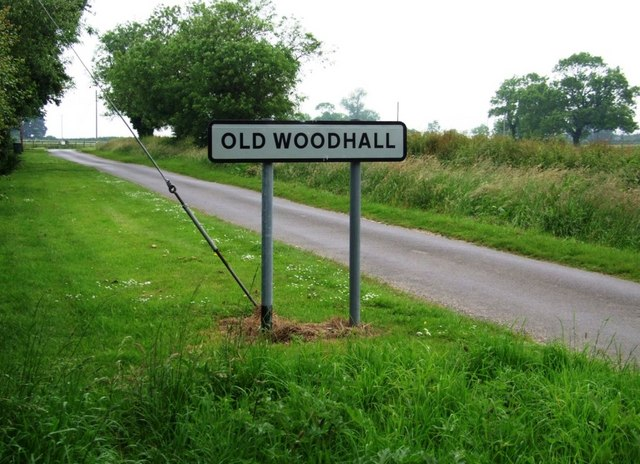
- Old Woodhall

- Location within Lincolnshire
- OS grid reference: TF219678
- Civil parish: Stixwould and Woodhall
- District: East Lindsey
- Shire county: Lincolnshire
- Region: East Midlands
- Country: England
- Sovereign state: United Kingdom
- Post town: Horncastle
- Postcode district: LN9 5
- Police: Lincolnshire
- Fire: Lincolnshire
- Ambulance: East Midlands
- UK Parliament: Louth and Horncastle (UK Parliament constituency)

Old Woodhall or Woodhall, is a village and former civil parish, now in the parish of Stixwould and Woodhall, in the East Lindsey district, in the county of Lincolnshire, England. It is located about 3 miles (4.8 km) south west of Horncastle. In 1961 the parish had a population of 123.

Woodhall Spa was created a civil parish on 1 April 1889 comprising portions of Langton, Woodhall, Thimbleby, and Thornton. The boundary between Woodhall Spa and Woodhall was the Reeds Beck Road. On 1 April 1987 the parish of Woodhall was abolished and merged with Stixwould to form "Stixwould and Woodhall".

The church of Saint Margaret was built in the 14th century and may have once been part of the moated manorial complex of Woodhall Hall. The church declared redundant by the Diocese of Lincoln in 1971, and was demolished in 1972.

There is a medieval moated site which represents the site of Woodhall Hall, which is an ancient scheduled monument.

Darwood House is a grade II listed farmhouse dating from the 15th century with 17th and 19th century alterations.
