= Deanery of Christianity (Lincoln) =

The Deanery of Christianity is a deanery in the Anglican Diocese of Lincoln in England immediately around the city of Lincoln. The deanery takes the name "Christianity" because there is a tradition that a diocese and a deanery should not share the same name.

== Parishes ==
- Lincoln St Botolph
- Boultham St Helen
- Boultham St Matthew
- Bracebridge, All Saints
- Lincoln St Giles
- Lincoln St Faith
- Lincoln St Mary le Wigford
- Lincoln St Nicholas
- Lincoln St Matthias
- Lincoln St Peter in Eastgate
- Lincoln St Annes Chapel
- Lincoln St Mary Magdalene with Saint Paul in the Bail
- Lincoln St Peter at Gowts
- Lincoln All Saints
- Lincoln St Swithin's
- Birchwood St Luke
- Bracebridge Heath St John the Evangelist
- Lincoln St John
- Lincoln St George's, Swallowbeck
