= Somerby by Gainsborough =

Hamlet in the West Lindsey district of Lincolnshire, England

Coordinates: 53.386048°N 0.724976°W

Somerby
- Location within Lincolnshire
- OS grid reference: SK849884
  - London: 140 mi (230 km) S
- Civil parish: Corringham, Lincolnshire
- District: West Lindsey
- Shire county: Lincolnshire
- Region: East Midlands
- Country: England
- Sovereign state: United Kingdom
- Post town: Gainsborough
- Postcode district: DN21
- Police: Lincolnshire
- Fire: Lincolnshire
- Ambulance: East Midlands
- UK Parliament: Gainsborough

Somerby (or Somerby by Gainsborough) is a hamlet in the West Lindsey district of Lincolnshire, England. It is situated 2 miles (3.2 km) south-east from the town of Gainsborough, and lies in the civil parish of Corringham.

The settlement is best known as the home of Richard Topcliffe, the infamous Tudor torturer and persecutor of Roman Catholics. Topcliffe brought one of his victims, Anne Bellamy, to Somerby in 1593 where she had a baby - believed to be Topcliffe's. He died here in 1604.

Excavations at Somerby in 1957 showed it was once larger, revealing 15th-century streets and house foundations, with finds ranging from the 12th to the 16th century. Much of the medieval village of Somerby was the site of an ancient deer park which belonged to Somerby Park mansion.

Somerby Park is described in the 1872 Whites Directory as "a commodious ancient mansion in the Elizabethan style".
