= Jim Almonds =

British Army officer

John Edward (Jim) Almonds
- Born: 6 August 1914; Stixwould, Lincolnshire, England
- Died: 20 August 2005 (aged 91)
- Spouse: May Almonds (née Lock)
- Children: 3
- Military career
- Allegiance: United Kingdom
- Branch: British Army
- Service years: 1932–1936; 1939–1945 c. 1955–1961
- Rank: Major
- Nickname: Gentleman Jim
- Service number: 2655348

John Edward Almonds (known as Jim Almonds and Gentleman Jim) (6 August 1914 – 20 August 2005), was a soldier in the first incarnation of the Special Air Service (SAS), created in North Africa, during the Second World War.

== Early life ==
John Edward (Jim) Almonds was born in the village of Stixwould on 6 August 1914, and left school at the age of 14. He was the son of a Lincolnshire smallholder; the family had lost their farm due to an outbreak of Foot-and-mouth disease before Almonds was born. In 1932, at the age of 18, Almonds joined the Coldstream Guards where he was given the nickname of Jim as there were too many Johns in his squad at Pirbright. During his tenure soldiering in London with the Guards, one of his roles was to guard the prisoner Norman Baillie-Stewart in the Tower of London. He left the Army in 1936 and joined the Bristol Police, but upon the outbreak of the Second World War, he rejoined his old regiment at Pirbright.

== Military career ==
Whilst back in the military, Almonds was also nicknamed Gentleman Jim on account of his "...deceptively soft voice and courtesy.." Another accolade afforded to Almonds came from David Stirling, who stated that Almonds "set the standard", and also that Stirling "..thought it was a bit unfair on the others who came after him because he was that good - his fitness, endurance and his character." In 1941, he was one of the original SAS soldiers alongside David Stirling, George Jellicoe, David Sutherland, and Pat Riley, when it formed at Kabrit, however, he didn't take part in their first ill-fated venture, as his son was ill in hospital with suspected meningitis, and it was expected Almonds would be recalled to Britain quite soon.

Almonds was also a renowned engineer, boats especially intrigued him; aged 10, he built his first boat out of a bacon box with toffee tins as outriggers. In one raid on an enemy airfield in 1942, Paddy Mayne, one of the SAS officers, ripped a compass out of an Italian aircraft and gave it to Almonds so that he could engineer the device to work in one of their jeeps. In the early days of the SAS, they used sun compasses as the metal of the jeeps they drove interfered with the magnetic compasses. The compass that Mayne wanted to be adapted for their use could not be done, as it was designed to be kept moving by the bleed from an aeronautical engine, and the exhaust from a jeep could not replicate this effect.

During a raid in Benghazi in September 1942, the SAS force was engaged by the enemy with Almonds' jeep taking a direct incendiary hit in the petrol tank. David Stirling thought that Almonds and the two other men in the jeep were killed outright, but they all managed to jump clear before an explosion. Almonds was taken prisoner and then moved to Italy by ship to be locked up in Prison Camp No. 51 at Altamura. After 13 months of captivity, and one failed escape attempt, Almonds escaped when he was asked by an Italian camp commandant to provide a reconnaissance report on German port activities; by this time the Italians had declared an armistice with the Allied Powers and the commandant stated that "Britain and Italy were friends". Almonds used the reconnaissance trip as a means of escape after phoning his report in to camp, he travelled over 230 miles (370 km) southwards to meet up with the advancing allies and during his trip he mapped out minefields which saved allied lives.

In September 1944, some three months after Almonds had parachuted into occupied France as part of Operation Gain, Paddy Mayne took Almonds to see Field Marshal Montgomery in his caravan with the recommendation that Almonds be commissioned as an officer. This request was granted after the "briefest of interviews".

Whilst in the Far East in the early 1950s, Almonds built an 18-foot (5.5 m) boat from teak, and used it to teach the military children sailing skills around the Changi Naval Base. At the end of his military career, Almonds crafted a two-masted sailboat, the SS Kumasi, which he built 200 miles (320 km) inland at Kumasi. It was taken to the coast at Takoradi, where Almonds and two colleagues sailed it from West Africa to the Azores, and then on to the United Kingdom.

== Post war ==
Almonds died in 2005; his wife pre-deceased him in 1997. All of Almonds' children joined the British Army; his son, Brigader John Almonds, also commanded within the SAS regiment.

== In popular culture ==
In the BBC series SAS: Rogue Heroes, Almonds is played by Corin Silva.

== Honours and awards ==
Military Medal	26 November 1942; 27 April 1944 (Bar)
Croix de guerre 1939–1945 with silver star	1945 (France)

== See also ==
- 1st SAS Brigade
- SAS operations
