= Dalby, Lincolnshire =

Village and civil parish in the East Lindsey district of Lincolnshire, England

Coordinates: 53.209919°N 0.104894°E

Dalby
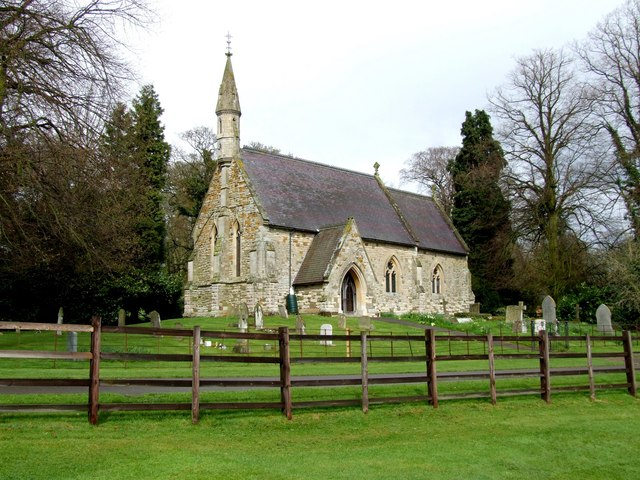
- Church of St Lawrence and Bishop Edward King, Dalby

- Location within Lincolnshire
- Population: (2001)
- OS grid reference: TF406701
  - London: 115 mi (185 km) S
- District: East Lindsey
- Shire county: Lincolnshire
- Region: East Midlands
- Country: England
- Sovereign state: United Kingdom
- Post town: Spilsby
- Postcode district: PE23
- Police: Lincolnshire
- Fire: Lincolnshire
- Ambulance: East Midlands
- UK Parliament: Louth and Horncastle

Dalby is a village and civil parish in the East Lindsey district of Lincolnshire, England. It is situated approximately 3 miles (5 km) north from the town of Spilsby. It is in the civil parish of Sausthorpe.

Dalby church is dedicated to Saint Lawrence and Bishop Edward King, and is a Grade II listed building built in 1862 by James Fowler of Louth to replace an earlier church. The font dates from the 14th century.

Dalby Hall is a Grade II listed house dating from the 18th century. The original Dalby Hall was destroyed by fire in 1841 and the present Hall was rebuilt nearby in 1856, also by James Fowler.

The hamlet of Dexthorpe is considered a deserted medieval village (DMV), first mentioned in 1086, and again in 1334. By 1577 there was just a pasture of two acres, a church, and a parsonage.
