= Church of St Mary and St Peter, Waddingham =

Church in Lincolnshire, England

Coordinates: 53°27′17″N 0°30′52″W

- Church of St Mary and St Peter, Waddingham
- Denomination: Church of England

History
- Dedication: St Mary St Peter

Administration
- Diocese: Lincoln
- Archdeaconry: Stow and Lindsey
- Parish: Waddingham, Lincolnshire

The Church of St Mary and St Peter is a church in Waddingham, Lincolnshire. It is a Grade II* listed building.

== History ==
The church was built in the 13th-15th centuries and went under a renovation in 1858 by Revd Windsor Berry. There are currently three bells in the tower, made by George Heathcote, Humphrey Wilkinson and Daniel Heathcote.

The church went under a restoration in 1862, where a south porch had been built and roofs were added to the nave and aisles, and was reopened in 1864.
