= Hagnaby =

Village in Lincolnshire, England

Coordinates: 53.145°N 0.010°E

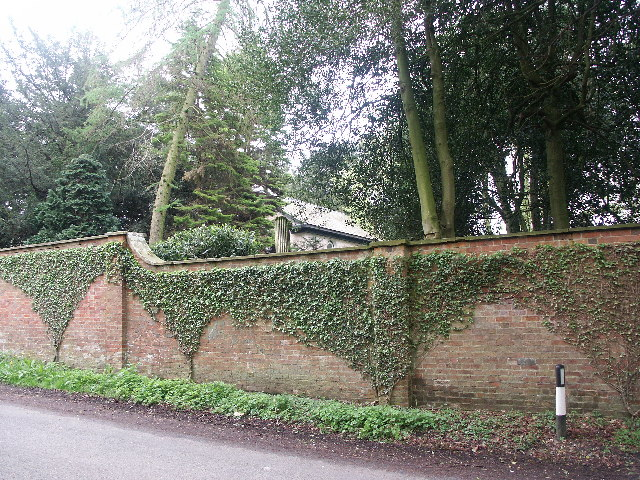

- Location within Lincolnshire
- OS grid reference: TF345627
  - London: 110 mi (180 km) S
- Civil parish: East Kirkby
- District: East Lindsey
- Shire county: Lincolnshire
- Region: East Midlands
- Country: England
- Sovereign state: United Kingdom
- Post town: Spilsby
- Postcode district: PE23
- Police: Lincolnshire
- Fire: Lincolnshire
- Ambulance: East Midlands
- UK Parliament: Louth and Horncastle

Hagnaby is a small village and former civil parish, now in the parish of East Kirkby, in the East Lindsey district of Lincolnshire, England. It is 4 miles (6.4 km) south-west from Spilsby. In 1961 the parish had a population of 18. On 1 April 1987 the parish was abolished and merged with East Kirkby.

Hagnaby is listed in the 1086 Domesday Book as "Hagenebi", with 23 households. In 1086 the Lord of the manor was Ivo Tallboys.

The church, dedicated to Saint Andrew, is a Grade II listed building dating from the late 18th century with 1881 and 1903 alterations, and consists of render over red brick.

A 19th-century mansion house assumed the name "Hagnaby Priory" although there is no historical record of any priory in the vicinity. In 1964 Pevsner stated that remains of a large 1835 Tudor and Gothic style house (Hagnaby Priory) by Charles Kirk existed as part of a current office wing.

In 1885 Kelly's Directory recorded a parish of 789 acres (3.2 km^{2}), with agricultural production of wheat, oats, barley and beans.
