= South Carlton =

Village and civil parish in the West Lindsey district of Lincolnshire, England

Coordinates: 53.274420°N 0.566105°W

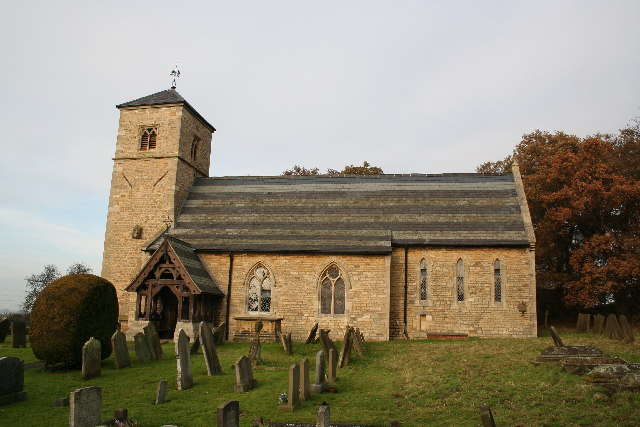
- Saint John the Baptist's Church, South Carlton

- Location within Lincolnshire
- Population: 168 (2011)
- OS grid reference: SK957762
  - London: 125 mi (201 km) S
- District: West Lindsey
- Shire county: Lincolnshire
- Region: East Midlands
- Country: England
- Sovereign state: United Kingdom
- Post town: Lincoln
- Postcode district: LN1
- Police: Lincolnshire
- Fire: Lincolnshire
- Ambulance: East Midlands
- UK Parliament: Gainsborough

South Carlton is a village and civil parish in the West Lindsey district of Lincolnshire, England. It is situated on the B1398 road, approximately 2 miles (3 km) north from the city and county town of Lincoln. The population (including Broxholme) at the 2011 census was 168.

== Church ==
South Carlton church is dedicated to Saint John the Baptist, and is a Grade I listed building dating from the 12th century with later alterations. After "various 18th and 19th century mutilations" it was almost entirely rebuilt in 1859, mostly by Samuel Sanders Teulon, and, according to Pevsner, presented "an unpromising exterior".

In the north chapel of the church, behind wrought iron railings, is the large alabaster and marble tomb of Sir John (d.1593) and Jane, Lady Monson (d.1625), dating from 1625, by Nicholas Stone. Their son was Sir Thomas Monson, who was an English politician.

A mausoleum for the Monson family was built in 1851 by Watkins, which contains a monument to the sixth Lord Monson (1796–1862) by Bartolini and Bencini.

Near the south porch in the graveyard, is a Grade II listed gravestone to William Sander who died in 1762, on which is inscribed the following:

"Remember, man, as you pass by,
As you are now so once was I,
As I am now so you must be,
Therefore prepair [sic] to follow me."

== School ==
The Monson Free School was founded here in 1678 by Sir John Monson. The current school building dates from 1876, and a nearby stone marks the date of the original. It is now closed.

== First World War airfield ==
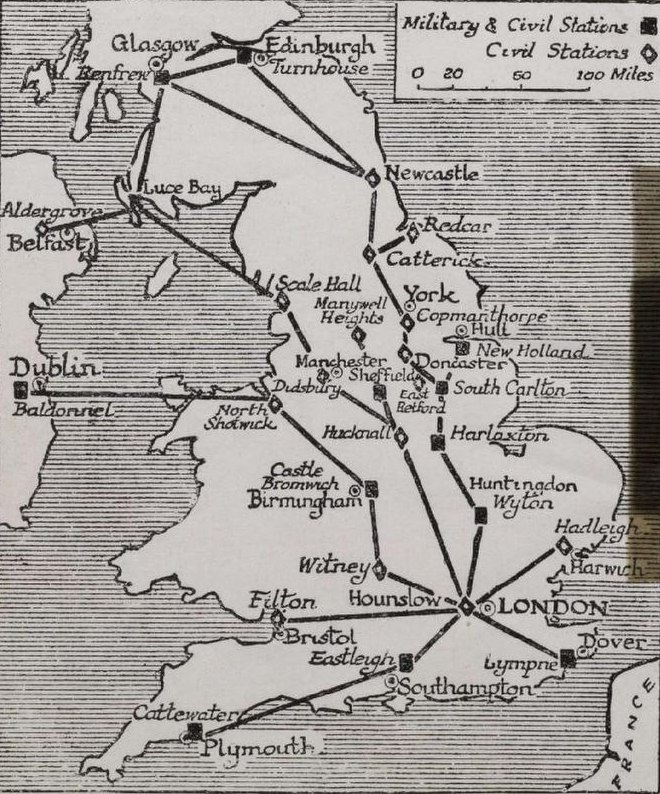
"Map of Air Routes and Landing Places in Great Britain, as temporarily arranged by the Air Ministry for civilian flying", published in 1919, showing South Carlton as a "military and civil station", and as a stop on the route between Hounslow, near London, and the north.

South Carlton Airfield opened in November 1916 with the code XOSQ, and consisted of seven large canvas and brick hangars, and wooden living quarters and offices. In July 1918 it was designated No 46 Training Depot Station and equipped with Avro 504, Camel and Dolphin aircraft. It closed in 1920.
