= Hannah cum Hagnaby =

Civil parish in the East Lindsey district of Lincolnshire, England

Coordinates: 53.287935°N 0.249075°E

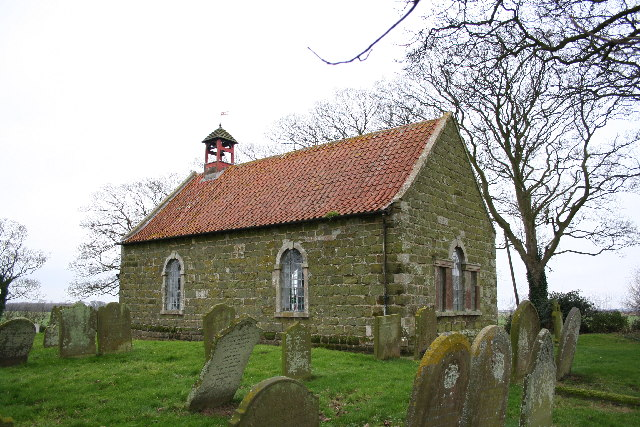
- St Andrew's Church, Hannah

- Location within Lincolnshire
- OS grid reference: TF500791
  - London: 120 mi (190 km) S
- District: East Lindsey
- Shire county: Lincolnshire
- Region: East Midlands
- Country: England
- Sovereign state: United Kingdom
- Post town: Alford
- Postcode district: LN13
- Police: Lincolnshire
- Fire: Lincolnshire
- Ambulance: East Midlands
- UK Parliament: Louth and Horncastle

Hannah cum Hagnaby is a civil parish in the East Lindsey district of Lincolnshire, England. It is situated approximately 4 miles (6 km) north-east from Alford, and 15 miles (24 km) south-east from Louth. The parish contains two small hamlets, Hannah and Hagnaby. Hannah was used in the Bronze Age as there is evidence of a Round Barrow. In antiquity Hannah was known as Hannay. The church, in Hannah, is dedicated to Saint Andrew and is a Grade I listed building, built of greenstone about 1758, with early 19th, and some 20th-century, alterations.

Hagnaby Priory, later Hagnaby Abbey, was in Hagnaby. Pevsner states that a Premonstratensian priory, founded in 1175, stood 0.5 miles (0.8 km) to the north of the village. Fragments of the priory, including octagonal shafts and window tracery, exist at Hagnaby Abbey Farm 1.25 miles (2.0 km) to the west. English Heritage has noted the existence of the suppressed priory through evidence of aerial photographs and building debris, and grassed foundations of a later formal garden and post-medieval house.
