= Ashby Parkland =

Civil parish in Lincolnshire, England

Coordinates: 53.569°N 0.695°W

Ashby Parkland is a civil parish in North Lincolnshire, England. The parish was created on 1 April 2004 and was previously part of the Burringham parish. The parish consists of a few fields and hamlets to the immediate west of Scunthorpe, and to the east of the M181, which marks the border with Burringham.
