= All Saints' Church, Lincoln =

Coordinates: 53°13′52″N 0°32′32.97″W

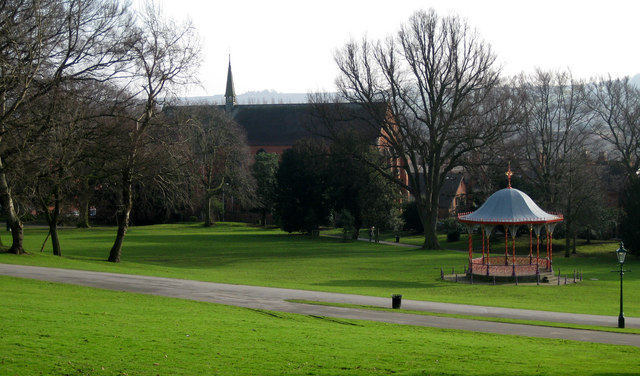
- All Saints' Church, Lincoln
- OS grid reference: SK 98520 71406
- Location: Lincoln
- Country: England
- Denomination: Church of England
- Churchmanship: Anglo-Catholic

History
- Dedicated: 1904

Architecture
- Heritage designation: Grade II listed
- Architect: C. Hodgson Fowler
- Completed: 1903

Administration
- Diocese: Diocese of Lincoln
- Archdeaconry: Lincoln
- Deanery: Christianity

All Saints' Church, Lincoln is a parish church on Monks Road in Lincoln in the Church of England.

The parish is part of the Deanery of Christianity within the Diocese of Lincoln.

== History ==
The church was erected in the Early Decorated style in 1903 to designs by the architect C. Hodgson Fowler. It contains decoration, rood screen and stained glass dating from the early 20th century by Ninian Comper.

The church is noted as having an altar slab from Bardney Abbey.

== Organ and organists ==
The organ dates from around 1906 and was by the London builder Henry Willis. It has since been renovated and modified. It is widely regarded as one of the finest organs in Lincolnshire. A specification of the organ can be found on the National Pipe Organ Register.

Previous organists have included Albert Hancock, (who served as Organist and Master of the Music for over 40 years), Graham Chapman, and Edward Hewes (now Organ Scholar at Canterbury Cathedral).

Specification: Pedal Key action Stop action Compass-low Compass-high Keys

            1 Open Diapason 16  
            2 Bourdon 16  

Great Key action Stop action Compass-low Compass-high Keys

            3 Double Open Diapason 16  
            4 Open No. 1 8  
            5 Open No. 2 8  
            6 Claribel Flute 8  
            7 Dulciana 8  
            8 Principal 4  
            9 Fifteenth 2 was Harmonic Flute 
            10 Trumpet 8  

Swell Key action Stop action Compass-low Compass-high Keys Enclosed

            11 Open Diapason 8  
            12 Lieblich Gedact 8  
            13 Salicional 8  
            14 Voix Celeste 8  
            15 Gemshorn 4  
            16 Piccolo 2  
            17 Mixture III  
            18 Cornopean 8  
            19 Oboe 8
