= Stixwould and Woodhall =

Civil parish in Lincolnshire, England

Coordinates: 53.1779°N 0.2437°W

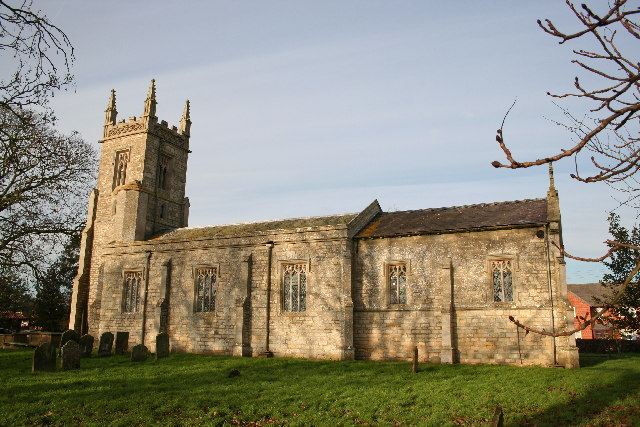
- St Peter's Church, Stixwould

- Location within Lincolnshire
- Area: 23 km^{2} (8.9 sq mi)
- Population: 255 (2011)
  - Density: 11/km^{2} (28/sq mi)
- OS grid reference: TF174659
  - London: 120 mi (190 km) S
- Civil parish: Stixwould and Woodhall
- District: East Lindsey
- Shire county: Lincolnshire
- Region: East Midlands
- Country: England
- Sovereign state: United Kingdom
- Post town: Woodhall Spa
- Postcode district: LN10
- Police: Lincolnshire
- Fire: Lincolnshire
- Ambulance: East Midlands
- UK Parliament: Louth and Horncastle

Stixwould and Woodhall is a civil parish in the East Lindsey district of Lincolnshire, England. The civil parish population (including Langton near Horncastle) was 255 at the 2011 census.

The parish incorporates the villages of Stixwould and Old Woodhall or Woodhall.
