= North Ormsby =

Village and civil parish in the East Lindsey district of Lincolnshire, England

Coordinates: 53.421850°N 0.06227°W

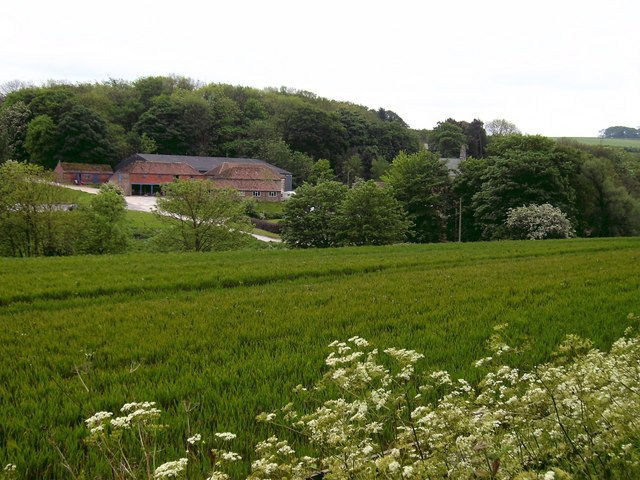
- North Ormsby

- Location within Lincolnshire
- Population: 134 (2011)
- OS grid reference: TF288934
  - London: 135 mi (217 km) S
- Civil parish: North Ormsby
- District: East Lindsey
- Shire county: Lincolnshire
- Region: East Midlands
- Country: England
- Sovereign state: United Kingdom
- Post town: Louth
- Postcode district: LN11
- Police: Lincolnshire
- Fire: Lincolnshire
- Ambulance: East Midlands
- UK Parliament: Louth and Horncastle

North Ormsby (sometimes Ormesby) is a village and civil parish in the East Lindsey district of Lincolnshire, England. It is situated approximately 7 miles (11 km) north-west from the market town of Louth. In 2021 the parish had a population of 43.

== History ==
North Ormsby was in antiquity known as Nun Ormsby. It is documented in the Domesday account as "Ormesbi". The manor comprised 1 smallholder, 10 freemen, 8 ploughlands, 40 acres (0.16 km^{2}) of meadow and 10 acres (0.040 km^{2}) of woodland. Lords in 1066 were Skemundr and Ulf Fenman, the land transferred to Geoffrey of Aalst as Lord of the manor in 1086 with Drogo of la BeuvriËre as Tenant-in-chief.

A Gilbertine priory dedicated to Saint Mary was founded as a double house between 1148 and 1154, and dissolved in 1538. There are still earthworks visible, and the site is scheduled.

== Church ==
The former parish church, which was dedicated to Saint Helen, is a Grade II listed building built in 1848 by S. S. Teulon. It was declared redundant in 1980 by the Diocese of Lincoln and sold for private residential use. Within the church is a railed monument surmounted by an urn, a memorial to Mary Russell (d.1855). Pevsner, however, assigns the tomb to John Ansell (d.1797) and his wife (d.1808), and describes it as "an exceptional piece".

In 1863 six graves cut from chalk and dressed with sandstone were found in the churchyard, and were probably of Saxon date. There is also a Grade II listed cross in the churchyard, dating from the 14th century.

== Landmarks ==
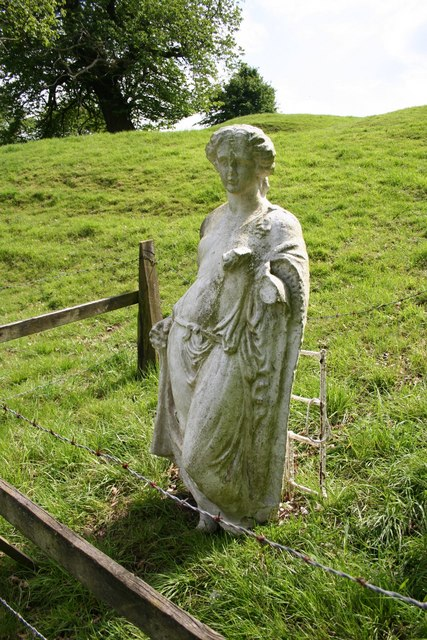
The White Lady

"The White Lady of North Ormsby" is a life-size statue in the grounds of Abbey Farm, which is Grade II listed. It is possibly of Roman origin, and depicts a lady in Grecian style. It was erected here in 1850 to commemorate the death of a lady in a riding accident. In 1964 Pevsner reported the White Lady's position as just south of Ormsby Abbey, a Victorian house.

Near Mill Farm is the site of a First World War military airfield established in 1917 and abandoned in 1919. It was intended for No. 33 Squadron RAF's use as an emergency landing site for aircraft if they were short of fuel during anti-Zeppelin operations.
