= Revesby, Lincolnshire =

Village and civil parish in Lincolnshire, England

Coordinates: 53.133527°N 0.059395°W

Revesby
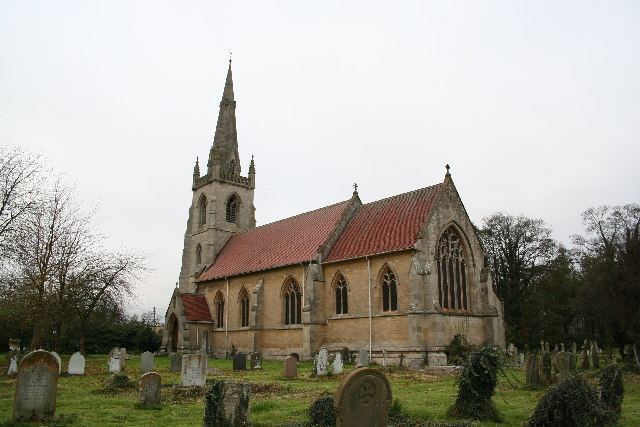
- Church of St Lawrence, Revesby

- Location within Lincolnshire
- Population: 243 (Including Miningsby, 2011)
- OS grid reference: TF299613
  - London: 115 mi (185 km) S
- District: East Lindsey
- Shire county: Lincolnshire
- Region: East Midlands
- Country: England
- Sovereign state: United Kingdom
- Post town: Boston
- Postcode district: PE22
- Police: Lincolnshire
- Fire: Lincolnshire
- Ambulance: East Midlands
- UK Parliament: Louth and Horncastle

Revesby is a village and civil parish in the East Lindsey district of Lincolnshire, England. It is 7 miles (11 km) south-east from Horncastle, 8 miles (13 km) east from Woodhall Spa and 14 miles (23 km) north from Boston, and on the A155. The parish includes the hamlet of Moorhouses 3 miles (5 km) to the south of Revesby village.

== History ==
The parish includes the site of the Cistercian abbey of SS Mary and Lawrence, founded in 1142 and colonised by monks from Rievaulx Abbey. The abbey was suppressed through the 1538 Dissolution of the Lesser Monasteries Act. A post-restoration house was built close to the site of the abbey by Craven Howard. This house was rebuilt in 1849 as Revesby Abbey in Elizabethan style, to the 1843 design of William Burn, architect for Harlaxton Manor, with 330 acres (1 km^{2}) of deer park. English Heritage styles the building Jacobean, with a build date of 1845. Revesby Abbey, with its stable yard, is Grade I listed. The deer park today holds an annual Revesby Country Fair.

The 1885 Kelly's Directory notes Sir Henry James Hawley and James Stanhope DL JP, as principal landowners. Stanhope was Lord of the manor. The parish is described as partly upland and partly fen, on which chief crops grown were wheat, oats, barley, turnips and mangolds. Parish area was 4,577 acres (18.5 km^{2}), with an 1881 population of 565. Parish occupations in 1885 included twelve farmers, a farm bailiff, gamekeeper, head gardener, blacksmith, carpenter, land agent, surgeon, and the publican at the Red Lion public house. The parish post master was also a grocer and draper.

By 1933, reduced parish area was 4,269 acres (17 km^{2}), with 15 of water. Civil parish population in 1921 was 457, and ecclesiastical parish, 375. Revesby Abbey was now the home of Lady Beryl Groves, Lady of the Manor, who, with Henry Cusack Wingfield, scion of the Hawley baronets, was principal landowner. Parish occupations in 1933 included nineteen farmers, one of whom was a landowner, and another a cottage farmer. There was a smallholder, a head gardener, two gamekeepers, a carpenter, a land agent, and the publican at the Red Lion public house. The post master and grocer had ceased to be a draper. Trades in 1933 not found in 1885 were a motor engineer—who hired-out cars and was a vehicle dealer, agent and repairer—and a motor and agricultural engineer.

Revesby Grade II listed Anglican church is dedicated to St Lawrence. The present church was built in Decorated style in 1891 on the site of a previous church built in 1733 by Revesby Abbey estate owner Joseph Banks, the great-grandfather of naturalist Sir Joseph Banks. The 1733 church was built on the site of an even earlier church. Parish registers date from 1595.

== Notable people ==
- John Chesser (architect) (1819−1892) – master-of-works at Revesby estate
