= Wood Enderby =

Village and civil parish in the East Lindsey district of Lincolnshire, England

Coordinates: 53.156763°N 0.095150°W

- Civil parish
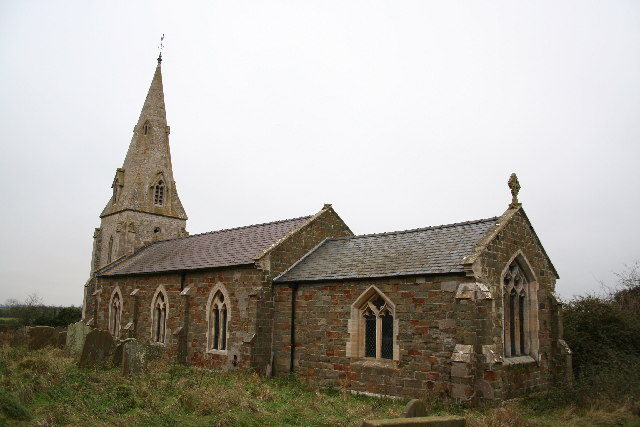
- Saint Benedict's Church, Wood Enderby

- Location within Lincolnshire
- Interactive map of Wood Enderby
- Area: 8.55 sq mi (22.1 km^{2})
- Population: 135 (2021)
  - Density: 16/sq mi (6.2/km^{2})
- OS grid reference: TF274638
  - London: 185 mi (298 km) S
- District: East Lindsey
- Shire county: Lincolnshire
- Region: East Midlands
- Country: England
- Sovereign state: United Kingdom
- Post town: Boston
- Postcode district: PE22
- Police: Lincolnshire
- Fire: Lincolnshire
- Ambulance: East Midlands
- UK Parliament: Louth and Horncastle

Wood Enderby is a village and civil parish in the East Lindsey district of Lincolnshire, England. It is situated approximately 4 miles (6 km) south from Horncastle. The civil parish includes the hamlet of Wilksby. The population was 135 at the 2021 census.

Wood Enderby has no amenities, such as a local shop or any retail outlet. There are approximately 50 households in the hamlet of Wood Enderby and nearly all are registered as private dwellings, there are few commercial dwellings in Wood Enderby. Wood Enderby has a 30 mph speed limit throughout the hamlet and its extremities.

A Dictionary of British Place Names states that Enderby derives from the Old Scandinavian person name 'Eindrithi', with 'by', Old Scandinavian for a farmstead, village or settlement. According to the web site of the Enderby & District Museum Society, Canada, the name Enderby "seems" to derive from 'Eindrithi's by', with Einraethi being Old Norse for 'sole ruler' with the suffix -by being Old Norse for village or homestead.

Wood Enderby is listed as "Endrebi" in the Domesday Book of 1086, at which time the Lord of the manor was William I. In 1198 and 1328 it was referred to as Woodenderby.

The Grade II listed church, dedicated to St Benedict, was almost entirely rebuilt in 1860 using limestone and greenstone. It was declared redundant by the Diocese of Lincoln in 1976.

Rose Cottage, in Wood Enderby, is a Grade II listed 17th-century white-washed mud and stud cottage, with 19th- to 20th-century alterations.

== Wilksby ==
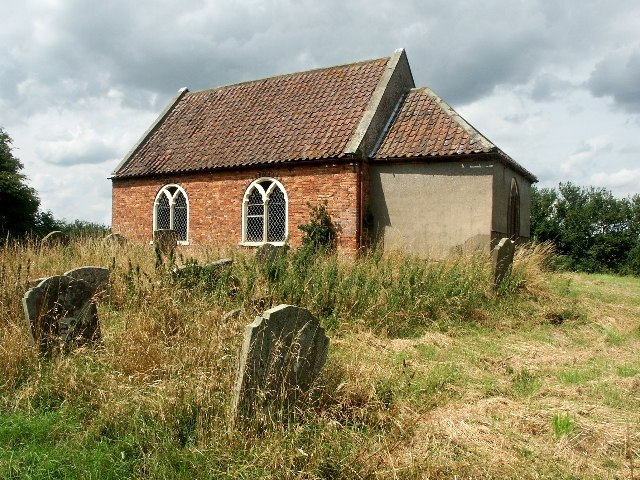
All Saints, Wilksby

Wilksby was mentioned in Domesday Book of 1086 as "Wilchesbi", with the Lord of the manor being William I.

It is a former civil parish, abolished in 1936 and amalgamated with Wood Enderby.

Wilksby church is dedicated to All Saints, Grade II listed, and built of greenstone and red brick, It was renovated in 1895.
