= Mareham le Fen =

Village in Lincolnshire, England

Coordinates: 53.131140°N 0.08949°W

Mareham Le Fen
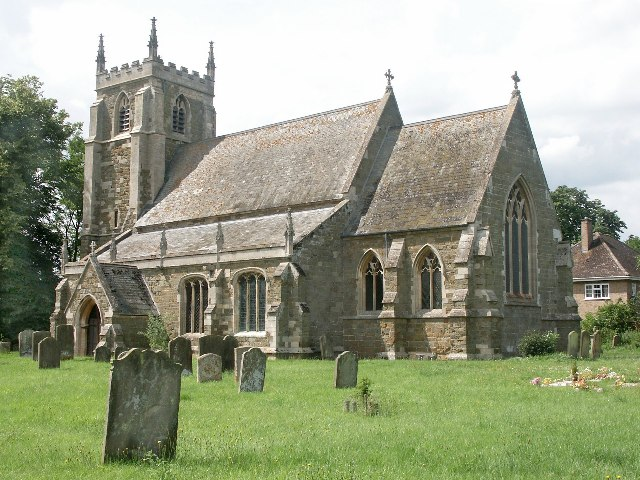
- Church of St Helen, Mareham le Fen

- Location within Lincolnshire
- Population: 944 (2011)
- OS grid reference: TF279610
  - London: 110 mi (180 km) S
- District: East Lindsey
- Shire county: Lincolnshire
- Region: East Midlands
- Country: England
- Sovereign state: United Kingdom
- Post town: Boston
- Postcode district: PE22
- Police: Lincolnshire
- Fire: Lincolnshire
- Ambulance: East Midlands
- UK Parliament: Louth and Horncastle n

Mareham le Fen (otherwise Mareham-le-Fen) is a village and civil parish about 6 miles (10 km) south from the town of Horncastle, Lincolnshire, England. The hamlet of Mareham Gate lies about 0.5 miles (0.8 km) south from the village, and it is believed that the deserted medieval village (DMV) of Birkwood is situated nearby.

Mareham le Fen is listed in the 1086 Domesday Book as "Marun", with 33 households, 60 acres (0.24 km^{2}) of meadow, 300 acres (1.2 km^{2}) of woodland, and a church. The Lord of the manor was William I.

The parish church is dedicated to St Helen, and is a Grade II* listed building of greenstone and dating from the 13th century. It was partially rebuilt in 1879, and in 1974 the vestry was extended using stone from the demolished church of St Margaret at Woodhall. In the north aisle is a tomb to James Roberts who died 1826, and sailed in the Endeavour with Captain Cook and Sir Joseph Banks. In the churchyard is a medieval stone cross, which is both Grade II listed and a scheduled monument. Dating from the 14th century, it was restored in 1904.

The Grade II listed Royal Oak public house has a datestone of 1473, but is believed to date from the 17th century, with 18th- and 20th-century additions.

Also in the village is a Grade II listed tower windmill dating from 1820, although it ceased working as a windmill in 1910 but continued to mill with an engine until mid 1940s

Mareham le Fen Church of England Primary School was built in 1840 as a National School and was enlarged in 1880.

Mareham le Fen Victory Silver Band, established in 1919, plays in the local area at events and services.

== Governance ==
An electoral ward with the same name exists. This ward stretches south west to Coningsby with a total population taken at the 2011 census of 2,123.
