= Francis Ford =

Francis Ford may refer to:

- Francis Ford (actor) (1881–1953), American actor, writer and film director
- Francis Ford (cricketer) (1866–1940), English cricketer, who played cricket in the late 19th century
- Francis Ford (politician), Canadian Liberal politician active in Edmonton
- Francis Ford (judge) (1882–1975), United States Federal Judge from Boston, Massachusetts
- Francis Thomas Ford (1877–1946), English engineer and inventor
- Francis Xavier Ford (1892–1952), Roman Catholic bishop and martyr
- Sir (Francis) Clare Ford (1828–1899), English diplomat

== See also ==
- Francis Ford Coppola (born 1939), American film director, producer and screenwriter
- Frank Ford (disambiguation)
- Frances Ford Seymour (female, 1908–1950), socialite
- Francis Forde (disambiguation)
