= Frank Ford =

Frank Ford is the name of:

- Frank Ford (Australian politician) (born 1936), Australian politician
- Frank Ford (theatre personality), (1935–2018) Australian writer and director
- Frank Ford (broadcaster) (1916–2009), Philadelphia radio host
- Frankie Ford (1939–2015), U.S. singer
- Frank Ford (footballer) (1907–1974), Australian rules footballer
- Frank Ford (priest) (1902–1976), Archdeacon of the East Riding from 1957 to 1970
- Frank C. Ford (1873–1965), Canadian lawyer

== See also ==
- Francis Ford (disambiguation)
- Frank Deford (1938–2017), American sportswriter and novelist
- Frank Forde (1890–1983), prime minister of Australia
