= Listed buildings in Bainton, East Riding of Yorkshire =

Bainton is a civil parish in the county of the East Riding of Yorkshire, England. It contains seven listed buildings that are recorded in the National Heritage List for England. Of these, one is listed at Grade I, the highest of the three grades, and the others are at Grade II, the lowest grade. The parish contains the village of Bainton and the surrounding countryside. The listed buildings consist of a church, a former rectory and associated structures, a farmhouse and farm buildings.

== Key ==
Grade	Criteria
I	Buildings of exceptional interest, sometimes considered to be internationally important
II	Buildings of national importance and special interest

== Buildings ==
Name and location	Photograph	Date	Notes	Grade
St Andrew's Church; 53.95834°N 0.53067°W		c. 1300	The church has been altered and extended through the centuries, including restorations in 1840–43 and in 1866–69, the latter by James Fowler. It is built in limestone and magnesian limestone and has a grey slate roof. The church consists of a nave, north and south aisles, a south porch, a chancel, a north vestry, and a west tower. The tower has three stages, a chamfered plinth, angle buttresses, a southwest stair turret, a four-light pointed west window with a hood mould, floor bands, a slit window, a west clock face, two-light bell openings with hood moulds, and an embattled parapet pierced with crosses.	I
Manor Farmhouse; 53.96636°N 0.53339°W	—	Late 18th century (probable)	The farmhouse is in pinkish-brown brick, with red brick dressings, a modillion eaves band, and a Westmorland slate roof, hipped on the left. There are two storeys, a double depth plan and a front range of three bays. The central doorway has a fanlight, the windows are sashes, and all the openings have flat arches of red rubbed brick.	II
Stables, barn and pigeoncote, Manor Farm; 53.96658°N 0.53357°W		Late 18th century (probable)	The farm buildings, later used for other purposes, are in red brick, with dressings in brick and stone, stepped eaves and pantile roofs. The central bay has two storeys, and contains two blocked segmental carriage arches, above which is a pitching door with pigeon openings under an elliptical arch, and a pyramidal roof. The flanking wings have one storey and contain a carriage entrance with a keystone, and doors and windows, most with elliptical arches.	II
Stables and outbuildings, former Neswick Hall; 53.96217°N 0.51551°W	—	Late 18th century	The farm buildings to the east of the demolished hall are in red brick with dentilled eaves, and have a hipped pantile roof. They form an L-shaped plan, and consist of a stable block with eight bays, and at right angles on the north are a barn and byres with five bays. The stable range has a semicircular arch and a keystone, and elsewhere there are doorways, some with keystones, casement and sash windows, vents and pitching doors.	II
The Old Rectory; 53.95798°N 0.53025°W	—	1815	The house is in pinkish-red brick, with pinkish-yellow tiles on the front, and a hipped pantile roof. There are two storeys, five bays, and rear ranges. Steps lead to a central entrance with a Doric doorcase with a pediment, and a door with a radial fanlight. The windows on the front are sashes with channelled wedge lintels. At the rear is a round-headed stair window. Flanking the house are single-storey stone coped screen walls containing rounded niches.	II
Coach house and stables, The Old Rectory; 53.95805°N 0.53070°W	—	Early 19th century	The building, later used for other purposes, is in pinkish-red brick with a pantile roof. The central bay has two storeys and a coped gable, and it is flanked by single-storey two-bay wings with hipped roofs. In the centre is a carriage entrance above which is pitching door, both with an elliptical arch. The windows contain doors with divided fanlights.	II
Dutch Barn, former Neswick Hall; 53.96217°N 0.51501°W	—	Mid-19th century	The Dutch barn, to the east of the demolished hall, is in red brick, and has a pantile roof with brick copings. It has a tall single storey, four bays, and four square piers on each side. The barn contains slit and diamond vents.	II
