= Francis Forde =

Francis Forde may refer to:

- Francis Forde (East India Company officer) (1718–1770), British officer who served with Clive of India
- Francis Forde (hurler) (born 1974), Irish hurling selector and former coach, manager and player
- Frank Forde (1890–1983), Prime Minister of Australia

== See also ==
- Francis Ford (disambiguation)
