= John de Bothby =

Lord Chancellor of Ireland

John de Bothby, or Boothby (born c.1320-died after 1382) was an English-born cleric and judge who became Lord Chancellor of Ireland.

== Biography ==
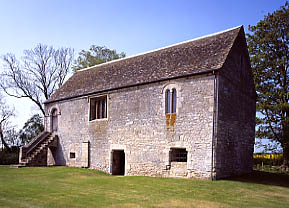
Boothby Pagnall, John's birthplace.

Boothby was born at Boothby Pagnall in Lincolnshire, the second son of Thomas de Bothby and his wife Alicia; his family were Lords of the Manor of Bourne, Lincolnshire. John himself later held the nearby manor of Cammeringham.

He is first heard of as a royal clerk. He rose in the public service, held a number of royal commissions, and was granted a licence to export corn in 1360. He came to Ireland as Lord Chancellor in 1371 and held the office until 1374. O'Flanagan remarks that nothing is known of his career as Chancellor, other than the fact of his appointment. Elrington Ball however notes that he was entitled to a military guard while in Ireland, and that he was sufficiently knowledgeable about Irish affairs to be sent back to England by the Privy Council of Ireland to report on them to King Edward III in 1372. Smyth records the payment to him of the cost of maintaining six men-at-arms and six mounted archers, who were given to him for his personal safety and for the safe custody of the Great Seal of Ireland. Having undertaken the journey to England at his own expense, he was later repaid 12 marks by the Council for the costs.

Unlike many holders of the office of Lord Chancellor of Ireland, who could reasonably expect to be appointed to a bishopric in due course, Boothby never rose above the position of vicar: he held the living of Keyingham, at Bainton, and later that of Hound, Hampshire. He was finally appointed vicar of the Church of the Holy Sepulchre, Northampton, and died there.

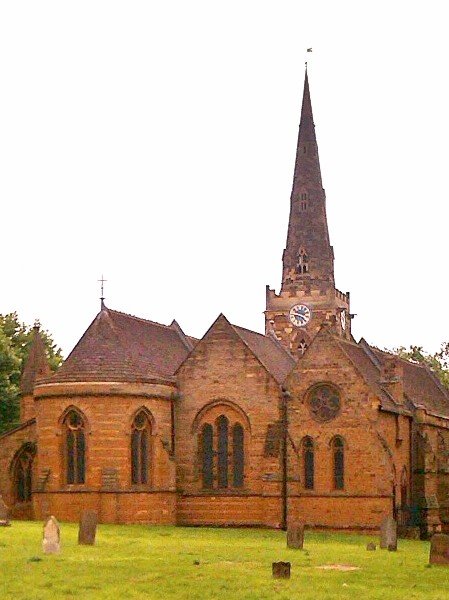
Holy Sepulchre Church, Northampton

His date of death is uncertain. He was still living in 1382 when he was asked to inquire into whether lands held by the Priory of Walton had been unlawfully acquired. His property passed to his nephew, also called John de Bothby.
