= Beswick Hall =

Building in the East Riding of Yorkshire, England

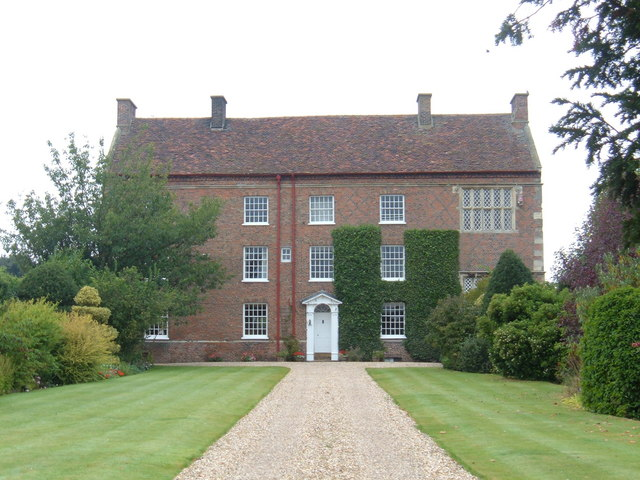
- The building in 2011

- Location within East Riding of Yorkshire

General information
- Location: Main Street, Beswick, East Riding of Yorkshire, England
- Coordinates: 53°55′10″N 0°27′41″W
- Year built: c. 1590
- Renovated: Mid-18th century (wing added) c. 1840 (storey added)

Listed Building – Grade II*
- Official name: Beswick Hall
- Designated: 7 February 1968
- Reference no.: 1103484

Beswick Hall is a historic building on Main Street in Beswick, East Riding of Yorkshire, a hamlet in England.

The house was built in about 1590 with two storeys. A rear wing was added in the mid-18th century, then around 1840 an extra storey was added to the majority of the house. Residents included Alexander Pope's friend Hugh Bethel, and the foxhunter William Draper. By the mid-19th century it had been divided into two farmhouses, and more recently has operated as a single farmhouse. The building was Grade II* listed in 1968.

The house is built of red brick, with burnt brick diapering, on a plinth, with stone dressings, quoins, a dentilled eaves cornice, and a tile roof with raised coped gables. There are five bays, the left four bays with three storeys, the right bay with two storeys, a basement, a rear stair projection and a rear wing. The central doorway has pilasters, a radial fanlight and an open pediment. The right bay contains a five-light mullioned and transomed window with a hood mould on each floor. Elsewhere on the front, the windows are sashes. The right return has three-light mullioned and transomed windows. Inside, there is an early 19th-century staircase, and several early 18th-century doors.

== See also ==
- Grade II* listed buildings in the East Riding of Yorkshire
- Listed buildings in Beswick, East Riding of Yorkshire
