= Sidney Leslie Ollard =

British Anglican priest (1875–1949)

Sidney Leslie Ollard (1875 – 28 February 1949) was a British Anglican priest, who served as a Canon of Windsor from 1936 to 1948.

== Biography ==
Born in 1875, he was educated at St John's College, Oxford and graduated BA in 1896, MA in 1899 and D.Litt. in 1947. He died on 28 February 1949.

He was appointed:

- Assistant curate, Holy Trinity, Hastings 1899 - 1902
- Christ Church (Oxford) Mission, Poplar 1902 - 1903
- Vice-Principal of St Edmund Hall, Oxford 1903 - 1913
- Rector of Dunsfold 1914 - 1915
- Rector of Bainton, Yorkshire 1915 - 1936
- Hon. Canon of Worcester Cathedral 1912 - 1935
- Prebendary of Wetwang in York Minster 1935 - 1936

He was appointed to the eleventh stall in St George's Chapel, Windsor Castle in 1936, and held the stall until 1948. From its inception in 1939, he was the editor of the Historical monographs relating to St. George's Chapel, Windsor Castle.
