= Church of St Andrew, Bainton =

Anglican church in the East Riding of Yorkshire, England

Church of St Andrew
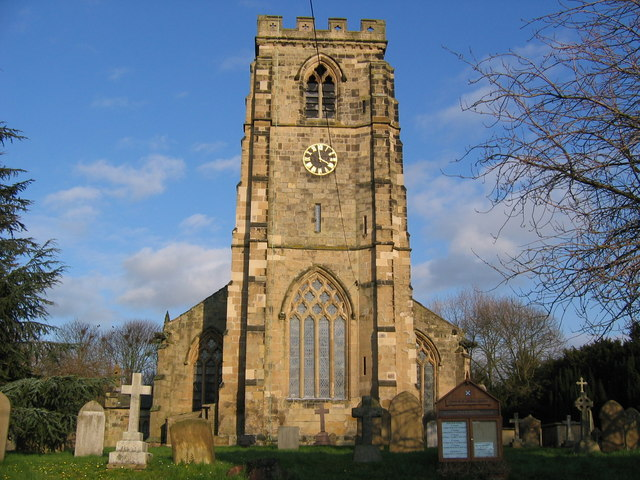
- Church of St Andrew, Bainton
- Church of St Andrew
- 53.9583°N 0.5305°W
- OS grid reference: SE965523
- Location: Bainton, East Riding of Yorkshire
- Country: England
- Denomination: Church of England
- Website: Official webpage

History
- Status: Parish church

Architecture
- Functional status: Active
- Architectural type: Decorated

Administration
- Diocese: Diocese of York
- Archdeaconry: East Riding
- Deanery: Harthill
- Benefice: Woldsburn
- Parish: Bainton

Listed Building – Grade I
- Designated: 20 September 1966
- Reference no.: 1083830

The Church of St Andrew is a grade I listed parish church in the village of Bainton, East Riding of Yorkshire, England. It is known locally as the Cathedral of the Wolds, a nickname it shares with the Church of All Saints, Pocklington, and along with the church at Pocklington, it has been noted for its Decorated style of architecture with one writer describing it as "stately and striking". The main fabric of the church dates back to the 14th century.

== History ==
The Domesday Book mentions the settlement of Bainton as having one priest, though there is no mention of a church. (Note: Brown suggests that the absence of a church may be due to the rector living in Bainton, but being attached to the church at Great Driffield, 7 miles (11 km) to the north-east. Besides Bainton, only two other locations in the East Riding were listed in Domesday as having a priest, but specifically without a mention of a church, and these are Swine and Withernsea.) The south-west corner of the chancel dates back to 1280, and it is possible that parts date back to the late 12th century/early 13th century. Apart from the Domesday notation about a priest, the first allocation of a named priest (Peter de St Flovier), is recorded in 1229. The main body of the church is thought to date back to the late 1330s/early 1340s, as a result of the preceding church being ransacked by Scottish raiders after the Battle of Byland in 1332. The dates for the building of the church can be accurately proved as it was recorded during the building phase that the clerk of Bainton was crushed when a pulley system failed, killing him. The west tower dates back to the main fabric of the church (14th century), and has a four-light window with hood mould. The second stage has a slit window, and the top of the tower has battlements with crosses pierced through the stones. The top of the tower used to have a spire of an octagonal shape which fell off during a storm in 1715. The remains of the spire were removed from the tower's roof in 1886.

The church consists of a nave with north and south aisles, a chancel, and porches on the north and south side. Renovations were carried out in the 1820s, something which Stephen Glynne describes as being in "...at some expense and in good spirit for the date." The whole of the east wall was pulled down in 1869 and then rebuilt during the extensive renovations carried out between 1866 and 1869 by James Fowler. Glynne notes that there is no clerestory, and the roof of the nave must have been lowered during one of these renovations as there is a mark in the east wall of the tower showing where a higher-pitched roof existed.

The font is thought to be Norman in origin and dates from between 1130 and 1140, thus predating the current church; it has a cylindrical bowl, sculptured lozenges, a chevroned rim, and it set upon two steps. Not long after the restoration of the early 1920s, a great storm and flood caused damage to the church; one of the pinnacles of the tower crashed down and fell through the roof of the church in January 1926 on account of the high winds. The East Window was installed in 1951, and shows a baby Jesus with St Andrew and St Peter, a crucifixion scene, the good shepherd with his sheep, and the feeding of the 5,000. The original window, an 1844 design by William Wailes, was damaged in 1941. Another restoration was carried out between 1995 and 2015, which cost £600,000. After the renovations, a map from 1629 showing the church with a spire was displayed in the church. The final part of the restoration was in 2016, and was a complete rebuild of the organ, which had last been played in 1986.

Edmund de Mauley was a noble in the local area who was described as being a "great pluralist", but was also notable for being killed at the Battle of Bannockburn when he was in a charge near to the Bannock Burn and he was drowned. His tomb is on the south side of the church. There is a brass memorial to Sir Roger Godeale, a former priest of the church, which is surrounded by a Latin inscription. Ollard theorises that the brass was moved (it is in the centre of the chancel) during renovations in the 1840s. The memorial to a former rector (Robert Faucon) has caused intrigue as it carries his death year (but no day or month) as 1640, however he is recorded as dying in 1661.

The churchyard has the grave of Caleb Angas, a noted agriculturist, and also has a memorial cross installed in 1920 to a design by Charles Nicholson. The church is dedicated to St Andrew, with the building being a grade I listed structure and is also part of Bainton Conservation area. It is known locally as the Cathedral of the Wolds, however, the Church of All Saints at Pocklington is also popularly known by this name. K. J. Allison described it (and All Saints at Pocklington) as being "..the most complete examples of the Decorated style [in the East Riding]", and Stephen Glynne observed that the interior was "stately and striking." Pevsner described it as an "..impressive church [that was]..such a change from those Early English parish churches...".

The church's listed rectory, south of the church, is of late Georgian period. According to Pevsner a local tradition connects the rectory's coniferous garden with Paxton. The rectory's coach house and stables are also listed buildings.

== Parish and clergy ==
The church is in its own parish of Bainton, part of the Benefice of Woldsburn, in the Deanery of Harthill, the Archdeaconry of East Riding, and the Diocese of York.

John de Bothby was in charge between 1351 and 1353. Bothby later became the Lord Chancellor of Ireland.

Sidney Leslie Ollard was the vicar between 1915 and 1936. Frank Ford was both the incumbent at Bainton (1957–1965) and the Archdeacon of the East Riding (1957–1970).

== See also ==
- Grade I listed buildings in the East Riding of Yorkshire
- Listed buildings in Bainton, East Riding of Yorkshire
