= Stewton =

Village and civil parish in the East Lindsey district of Lincolnshire, England

Coordinates: 53.360039°N 0.043305°E

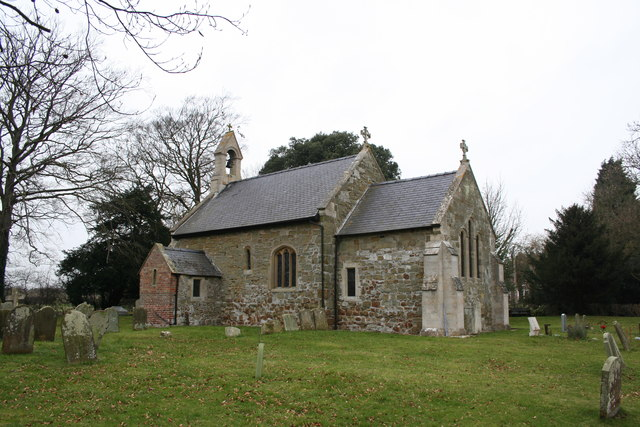
- St Andrew's Church, Stewton

- Location within Lincolnshire
- OS grid reference: TF360867
  - London: 135 mi (217 km) S
- District: East Lindsey
- Shire county: Lincolnshire
- Region: East Midlands
- Country: England
- Sovereign state: United Kingdom
- Post town: Louth
- Postcode district: LN11
- Dialling code: 01507
- Police: Lincolnshire
- Fire: Lincolnshire
- Ambulance: East Midlands
- UK Parliament: Louth and Horncastle

Stewton is a village and civil parish in the East Lindsey district of Lincolnshire, England. It is situated about 2 miles (3.2 km) east from the town of Louth, in the Lincolnshire Wolds, a designated Area of Outstanding Natural Beauty. The population is included in the civil parish of Keddington.

In the Domesday Book of 1086 the village is written as "Stivetone", with 19 households, 3 acres of meadow and 5 acres of woodland.

The Grade II* listed parish church is dedicated to Saint Andrew and dates from the 11th century, although it was rebuilt in 1866 by James Fowler of Louth. In 1902 the west porch was added.

Stewton was the birthplace of William Spavens (1735–99), whose life story 'The Seaman's Narrative' is an important historical source about life in the Royal Navy. In it he describes how he was forced into the Navy by a press gang but later joined a press gang himself.
