= Listed buildings in Beswick, East Riding of Yorkshire =

Beswick is a civil parish in the county of the East Riding of Yorkshire, England. It contains ten listed buildings that are recorded in the National Heritage List for England. Of these, two are listed at Grade II*, the middle of the three grades, and the others are at Grade II, the lowest grade. The parish contains the villages of Beswick and Kilnwick, the hamlet of Wilfholme, and the surrounding countryside. The listed buildings consist of houses and associated structures, and a church.

== Key ==
| Grade | Criteria |
|---|---|
| II* | Particularly important buildings of more than special interest |
| II | Buildings of national importance and special interest |

== Buildings ==
| Name and location | Photograph | Date | Notes | Grade |
|---|---|---|---|---|
| All Saints' Church, Kilnwick; 53.93217°N 0.48288°W | | 12th century | The church has been altered and extended through the centuries, the chancel, nave and north aisle being largely rebuilt in 1871. The church is built in stone with slate roofs, and consists of a nave, a north aisle, a north porch, a chancel and a west tower. The tower has two stages, a chamfered plinth, a northeast stair turret, and round-headed bell openings, above which is a band and an embattled parapet. The reset north doorway is Norman, and has two orders. The shafts have scalloped capitals, and the arches have beakhead decoration and a single beast at the head of the arch. | II* |
| Beswick Hall; 53.91944°N 0.46141°W | | c. 1600 | The house has been much altered and remodelled. It is in red brick, with burnt brick diapering, on a plinth, with stone dressings, quoins, a dentilled eaves cornice, and a tile roof with raised coped gables. There are five bays, the left four bays with three storeys, the right bay with two storeys, a basement, a rear stair projection and a rear wing. The central doorway has pilasters, a radial fanlight and an open pediment. The right bay contains a five-light mullioned and transomed window with a hood mould on each floor. Elsewhere on the front, the windows are sashes. The right return has three-light mullioned and transomed windows. | II* |
| Kilnwick Old Hall; 53.93426°N 0.48550°W | — | Early 17th century | The remaining part of Kilnwick Hall, the rest of which was demolished in 1951–52, it has been used for various purposes. It is in red brick on a moulded plinth, with a dentilled eaves cornice, and hipped stone slate roofs. There are two storeys and attics, and an L-shaped plan, consisting of a south wing of five bays, and an east wing of four bays. The doorways have four-centred arches, and the windows are a mix of mullioned cross windows, casements and sashes, some horizontally sliding. | II |
| Gate piers, Shrubbery Garth; 53.93138°N 0.48455°W | — | c. 1700 | The gate piers were originally to Kilnwick Hall, most of which has been demolished. There are two pairs of piers, the outer ones smaller. All are rusticated and have a square plan, a square base, bands, paterae and ball finials. | II |
| Gate piers, Kilnwick Old Hall; 53.93219°N 0.48801°W | | Mid-18th century | The gate piers at the entrance to the drive were originally to Kilnwick Hall, most of which has been demolished. There are two pairs of piers, the outer ones smaller. The two left piers were designed by John Carr, and the others, which are identical, were added in 1851. All are rusticated and have a square plan, a square base, and ball finials. | II |
| Rose Cottage; 53.91536°N 0.40234°W | | Mid-18th century | The house is in brick, and has a pantile roof with tumbled-in brick to the raised gables, and a rounded saddle on the left. There is one storey and attics and four bays. On the front is a doorway, and horizontally sliding sash windows under segmental arches. | II |
| The Gardens and attached garden walls 53.93167°N 0.48419°W | — | Mid-18th century | The house, formerly a pavilion, is in red brick with a dentilled eaves cornice and a pyramidal tile roof. There are two storeys and fronts of two bays. The house has a later porch extension with sash windows, and a Diocletian window above. At the rear is a tablet with guttae and an inscription. The attached walls are in brick with stone coping, and formerly enclosed the kitchen garden of Kilnwick Hall, most of which has been demolished. | II |
| Town End Farm and outbuildings 53.93076°N 0.47924°W | — | Mid-18th century | The house and flanking outbuildings are in brown brick, with impost bands, modillion eaves cornices, and Roman tile roofs. The house has two storeys and three bays. Each bay contains a giant recessed round arch, and in the centre is a doorway with a fanlight. The windows are sashes, those on the ground floor with flat gauged brick arches, and those on the upper floor with segmental heads. Each outbuilding has a single storey, a square plan, a giant recessed round arch, and a pyramidal roof. | II |
| Well head, Kilnwick Old Hall; 53.93419°N 0.48530°W | — | 1770 | The building in the courtyard of the house has a pump house in brick, with a square plan and a flight of six stone steps. On it is a timber bell tower that has Tuscan columns with imposts and a modillion cornice, surmounted by an ogee cupola with a lead roof, containing a bell. | II |
| Ha-ha, Kilnwick Old Hall; 53.93174°N 0.48663°W | — | Late 18th century (probable) | The ha-ha is in red brick, and runs between two sets of gate piers originally to Kilnwick Hall, most of which has been demolished. | II |
