= Cammeringham Priory =

Religious house In Lincolnshire, England

Coordinates: 53°19′40″N 0°34′38″W

Cammeringham Priory was a priory in Cammeringham, Lincolnshire, England, and was one of nine Premonstratensian houses in the historical county.

It was an Alien house granted by 1126 to the abbey of L'Essay in the diocese of Coutances, by Robert de Haya, with the advice of his wife Muriel, and also to the Premonstratensian abbey of Blanchelande in Normandy. A dispute arose between the two abbeys, which was settled in favour of Blanchelande in 1192, by William Bishop of Coutances.

The advowson of the priory passed first to Alice, countess of Lancaster, and from her to Hugh le Despenser, 1st in 1325. Shortly afterwards it reverted to the King. In 1396 the abbot of Blanchelande sold all his rights in the house to the Cistercian abbot of Hulton in Staffordshire. At the Dissolution of the Monasteries it was granted to Robert Tyrwhitt.

Cammeringham Manor House, built around 1730, retains the now blocked-up cellars of the priory, though there is no visible evidence above ground level.
