= Kilnwick =

Village in the East Riding of Yorkshire, England

Coordinates: 53°55′56″N 0°28′47″W

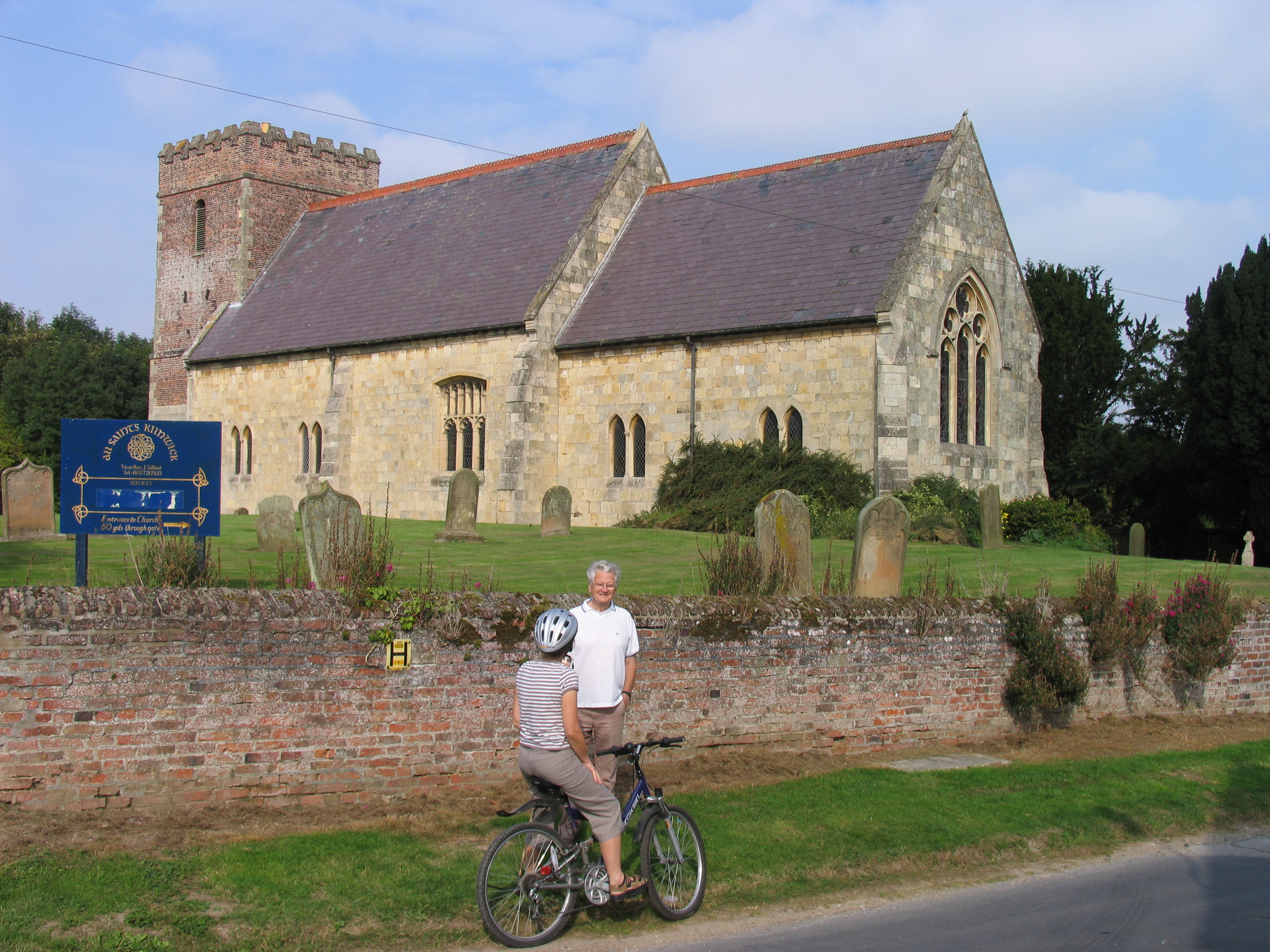
- Kilnwick Church, viewed from the south-east

- Location within the East Riding of Yorkshire
- OS grid reference: SE997494
  - London: 165 mi (266 km) S
- Civil parish: Beswick
- Unitary authority: East Riding of Yorkshire
- Ceremonial county: East Riding of Yorkshire
- Region: Yorkshire and the Humber
- Country: England
- Sovereign state: United Kingdom
- Post town: DRIFFIELD
- Postcode district: YO25
- Dialling code: 01377
- Police: Humberside
- Fire: Humberside
- Ambulance: Yorkshire
- UK Parliament: Beverley and Holderness

Kilnwick (or Kilnwick-on-the-Wolds) is a village and former civil parish, now in the parish of Beswick, in the East Riding of Yorkshire, England. It is situated in the Yorkshire Wolds approximately 5 miles (8 km) south of Driffield town centre and 7 miles (11 km) north of Beverley town centre. It lies 1 mile (1.6 km) west of the A164 road, and 3 miles (5 km) east of Middleton on the Wolds. In 1931 the parish had a population of 180.

== History ==
The name Kilnwick derives from the Old English Cyllaingwīc meaning 'trading settlement connected with Cylla'.

Kilnwick a small, seemingly unremarkable village, first called Chilewic in the Domesday Book (1086), has existed as a rural agricultural settlement for well over a thousand years, The foundation of Kilnwick as a settlement most likely began in the mid to late 9th century - the late period of the Kingdom of Northumbria, an area of land that extended from the north bank of the Humber estuary to the Firth of Forth in Scotland. Its inhabitants were known as the Norpan-hymb (the people or province north of the Humber).

The Kilnwick estate has over the centuries been in the hands of many people. The Domesday Book informs us that Mula-Grimr and Ealdwif – the first known names of villagers, had land which they farmed here in Kilnwick well before 1086. By the end of the 12th century, a good deal of Kilnwick land lay in the hands of the Gilbertine Priory of Watton, a double religious house (men & women). The priory had a sizable farm, or Grange in Kilnwick, the foundations of which may still lie beneath the remnants of Kilnwick hall. The priory also had Granges in nearby Swinkeld, Cawkeld and Burnbutts. From at least the thirteenth century, an important Kilnwick family appears to have been that of the Normanvilles. The Normanvilles were a branch of the family Basset of Normandy and may well have arrived in England with William the Conqueror in 1066. The Normanville family are recorded by the Surtees Society as being the “…ancient family of Normanville of Kilnwick”

On 1 April 1935 the parish was abolished and merged with Beswick.

=== Kilnwick House ===
Kilnwick House is thought to have been developed on the site of a medieval farm that was under the control of the Gilbertine Canons of nearby Watton Priory. During the Dissolution of the Monasteries between 1536 and 1539, the Kilnwick estate was granted to Robert Holgate, who later became Archbishop of York, and passed on his death to the Earl of Warwick. At the time of the sale and break-up of the Kilnwick Estate in 1951, the oldest part of the house was Jacobean, having likely been built in the early years of the 17th century by Richard Thekestone who held the manor in 1599, or Nicholas Stringer, owner from 1614.

The south frontage of Kilnwick House, as seen in a 1951 sales catalogue

The house was vastly extended in the 18th century by Thomas Grimston, who had been bequeathed the property by Vice-Admiral Medley in 1747. It was during the period 1740–80 that the Georgian south and east frontages were built. But it would seem that Kilnwick House was occupied only seasonally by the family and its entourage during the 18th century, and there is diary evidence that the journey would be made to Kilnwick from Grimston Garth in the autumn of each year. The estate remained in the hands of the Grimston family until 1943 when, on the death of Captain Luttrell Grimston Byrom, it was sold.

=== Kilnwick Bricks ===
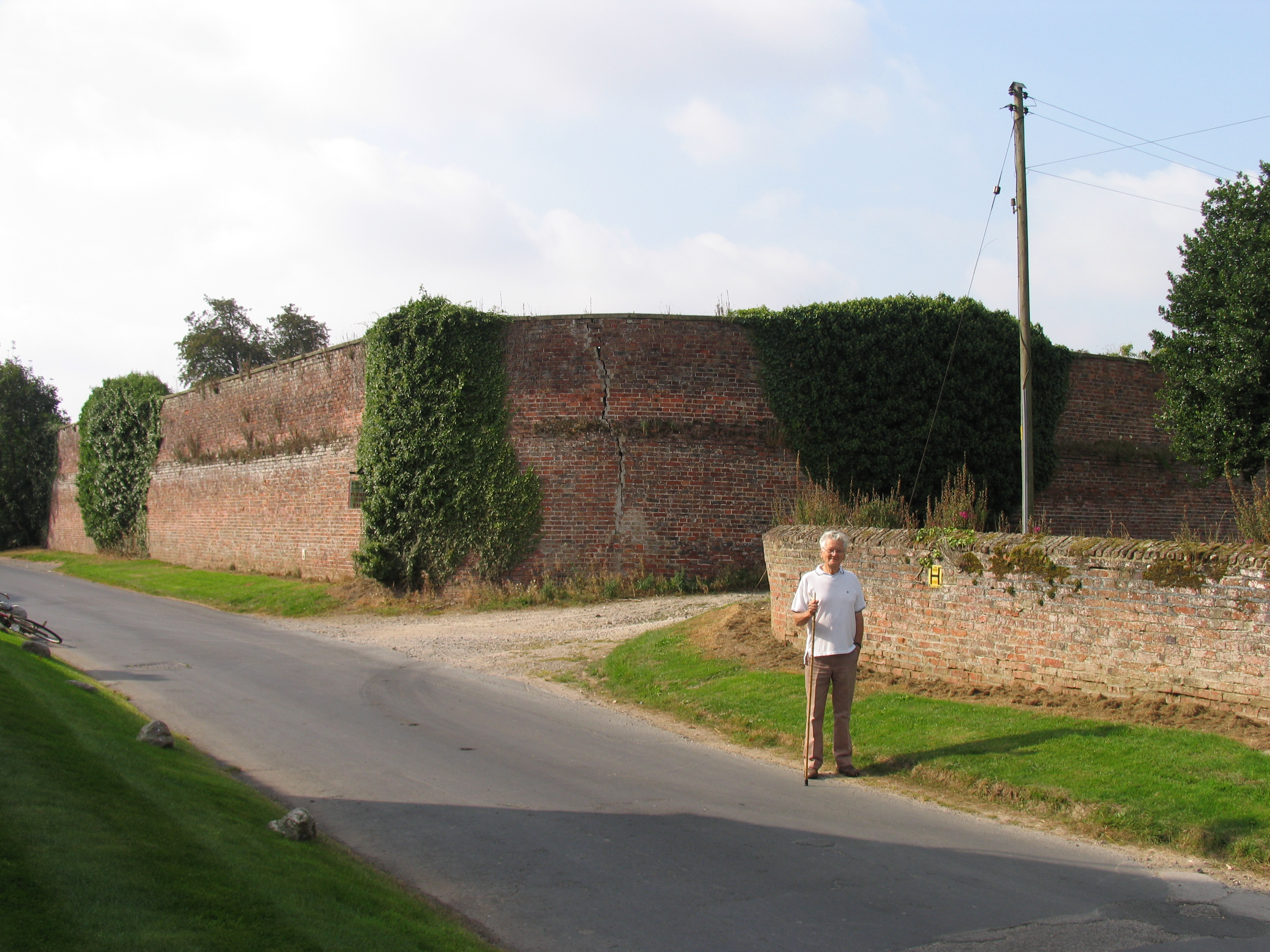
The wall surrounding the Kilnwick walled garden, taken from Church Road

A walled garden is located south of the church. The wall is over one metre thick and four metres high and was built entirely of bricks topped by coping flags. It encloses an area of more than half a hectare and has built into it, at its western end, a two-storey cottage. The walled garden must have served Kilnwick House, primarily for the purpose of supplying vegetables, though seasonal occupation of the house by the Grimston family raises the question why such a large enclosure was required. Today the magnificence of the structure is partially concealed by an overgrown holly hedge along the C59 road to the south, and by growth of ivy, which mounts the walls.

All Saints' Church, Kilnwick continues the theme of brick construction in that, while the nave is built of Jurassic limestone, the diminutive tower is made of brick, making it unusual in character. The Church is simple: there is no transept and there are no lady chapels. It is of mixed period construction, the oldest part being the Norman arch at the North Door. The church, dedicated to All Saints, was designated a Grade II* listed building in 1968 and is now recorded in the National Heritage List for England, maintained by Historic England.

Brick also figures in the ha-ha that lies to the north of the C59 immediately west of the village, now forming the side of the road ditch. This is in a state of poor repair, since the construction was dry stone, involving no mortar, and expansion and contraction of the clay subsoil over the years has led to bulges and the loosening of bricks.

Brick is (as in Holderness, in general) also the building material of the cottages and farmhouses that make up the village buildings that were constructed before the 20th century, and there was a brick kiln in the village. In 1820, records show that 68,000 bricks were made, attracting an excise tax of £17 1s. 3d. A walk northwards along the footpath from the corner of Church Lane and Main Street – what is now part of the Minster Way – takes one through the flood plain of Kilnwick Beck. Here, on the north side of the beck, the unnaturally uneven ground is testimony to the shallow clay workings that must have been the source of one of the raw materials used by the kiln workers. This readily available, local source of bricks is a likely explanation for the size and extent of the walled garden and the interesting, but seemingly casual, construction of the dry-brick ha-ha. It explains why the church tower is built of brick rather than limestone carted at great expense from the quarries along the Jurassic outcrop beyond the Wolds at e.g. South Newbald and South Cave or on the Howardian Hills, north-west of Malton. It might also reflect the (dis)interest and (lack of) wealth of successive owners of the Estate.

=== Prehistory ===
The clays that are the major constituent of Holderness, upon which Kilnwick is situated, are glacial in origin. Successive Pleistocene ice sheets swept south on a broad front from Northumbria, the Arctic Sea, and Scandinavia. The last advance – the Devensian glaciation (circa 60,000 to 20,000 years before present) – was diminutive by comparison with its predecessors, but was responsible for building not only Holderness as it extends today, but a plain of greater west–east extent that has been trimmed in post-glacial times – roughly the last 10,000 years – by cliff erosion as sea level has risen about 90 metres to restore the North Sea.

Indeed, pre-glacial Kilnwick (had it existed) would have been on a re-entrant of the North Sea. The re-entrant was one of many along a crenulated coastline. The re-entrant was the drowned lower reach of a valley that had been created by runoff from the Wolds along what are now the headwater dry valleys around and west of Middleton. The pre-glacial coastline is most marked in the neighbouring village of Beswick, which sits on a degraded chalk cliff. A sense of the slope of the old cliff-line can be experienced by following the unclassified road that runs from Lund to Beswick; the comparative steepness of the last 100 metres that fall towards Little Beswick is unusual for the area. The same sense of steepness is gained when taking the Rotsea road out of Hutton. ‘Beswick-on-Sea’ and ‘Hutton-on-Sea’ were promontories that protected bays such as Kilnwick and Lockington. It is uncertain whether the site of present-day Kilnwick would have been subaerial or submarine. Almost certainly, the lower level of the neighbouring village of Lockington would mean that it would have been submerged.

The Devensian glaciation was deflected in its southward advance by the northern buttress of the North York Moors. Because of this, the ice sheet was divided, one arm flowing southward down the Vale of York, the other curling around the Moors and Wolds to deposit Holderness. The Wolds were free of over-riding ice but would have been subjected to intense periglacial conditions like those of modern Lapland. The till left by the ice (a mixture of clay with cobbles and boulders and, occasionally, outwash sands and gravels) feathers out westward of Kilnwick. At Lund and Middleton, there is none. Villages such as Kilnwick, Beswick, Watton and Lockington sit at the transition between Holderness and the Wold.

== Present day ==
=== Modern landscape ===
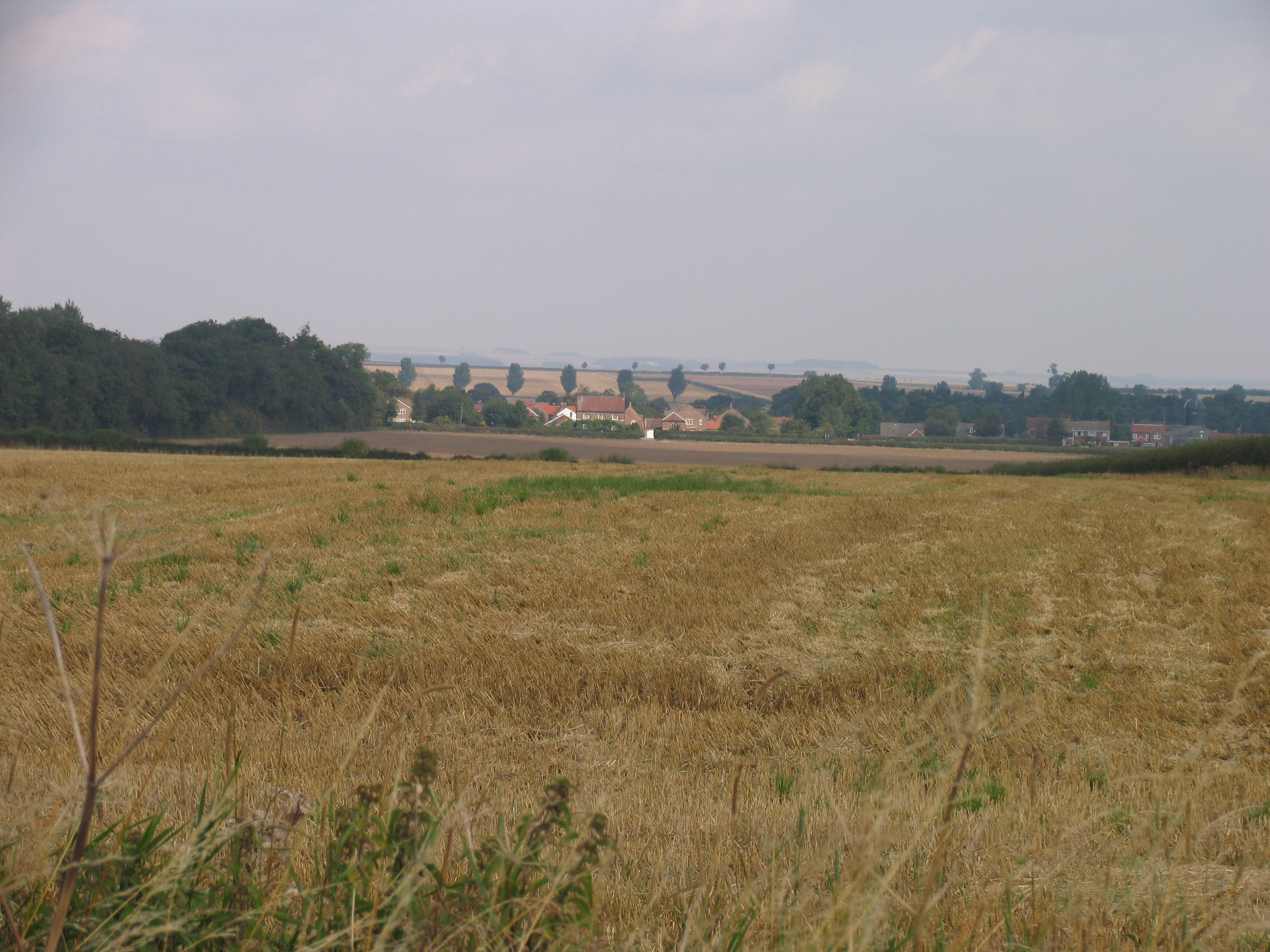
A view of Kilnwick from the south, with the East Belt Plantation to the left.

The landscape of Kilnwick owes much to its history as an Estate, having been described, at the time of its sale in 1951, as 'one of the finest shoots in Yorkshire'. The 1951 sales brochure drew attention particularly to the ‘bag’ of game that had been got over the six years since the end of the Second World War. Because of its history, it is exceptionally well endowed with woodland, which stems from the use of coverts for rearing game birds. Within a mile of the village centre, there are six sizeable linear plantations: Wedding Wood, West Belt, High Wood, East Belt, Low Wood and Stonybroke, each of which serve to give the impression of a well-wooded landscape. Given its low-lying position, and its diminutive church tower, Kilnwick is not easy to spot until a visitor is within the ring of woodland that surrounds it, and the density of trees is in stark contrast to the oft-treeless arable land of the Wolds to the north and west and Holderness to the east.

Unlike Lockington, which lies directly alongside its beck (much to its cost in the floods of July 2007), Kilnwick sits on a low river terrace and so avoids overbank floods that emanate from its own highly regulated beck. Despite this, the suffix ‘wick’ probably denotes the Anglo-Saxon for ‘village’ rather than its other meaning ‘marsh’.

=== Village ===
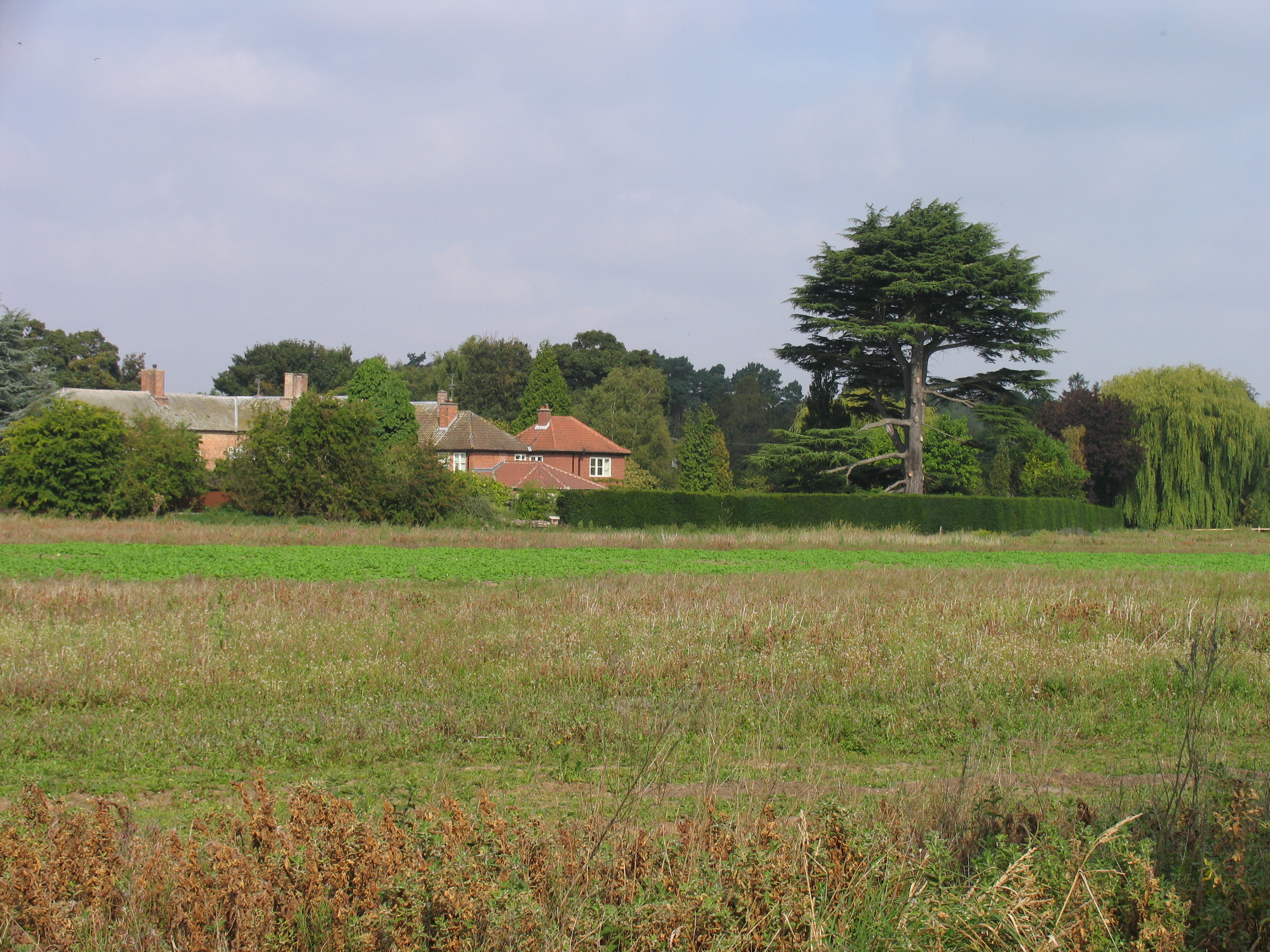
The site of Kilnwick House in 2007

Older houses lie on the west side of the village, between Church Lane and School Lane, while farms such as Highthorpe and Townend stood nearby, separated by fields. Developments since 1950 have filled the eastward extension of Main Street towards Highthorpe, while in-fill or the replacement of houses in School Lane, the extension of housing for a 110 yards (100 m) along High Road (the C59 to Middleton), and the refurbishment of the barns along Church Road remove the sense of strassedörfer (a village street). Somewhat distant, the out-buildings of Kilnwick House have been developed separately for residential use, while the Georgian part of the house was demolished, leaving the Jacobean wing and the butler's and servants’ quarters (now named ‘The Old Hall’).

The old post office. The actual site is unknown.

The first mention of a post office in Kilnwick is when a type of postmark known as an undated circle was issued in 1847. In 1963, the village sub-postmistress was Mrs. Ann Baston. The post office had closed by 1995. Kilnwick currently has no shop or public house; the nearest are found in Middleton on the Wolds, Hutton Cranswick and Lund, while Lockington still clings to the provision of a post office). This has not always been the case, though trading seems to have taken place from what were residential properties.

Similarly, as part of a rationalisation, the school in School Lane ceased to function in this capacity and primary-level pupils attend Beswick & Watton School, 1 mile (1.6 km) to the east on the A164.

== See also ==
- Listed buildings in Beswick, East Riding of Yorkshire
