= St Margaret's Church, Beswick =

Church in the East Riding of Yorkshire, England

Coordinates: 53.9194°N 0.4600°W

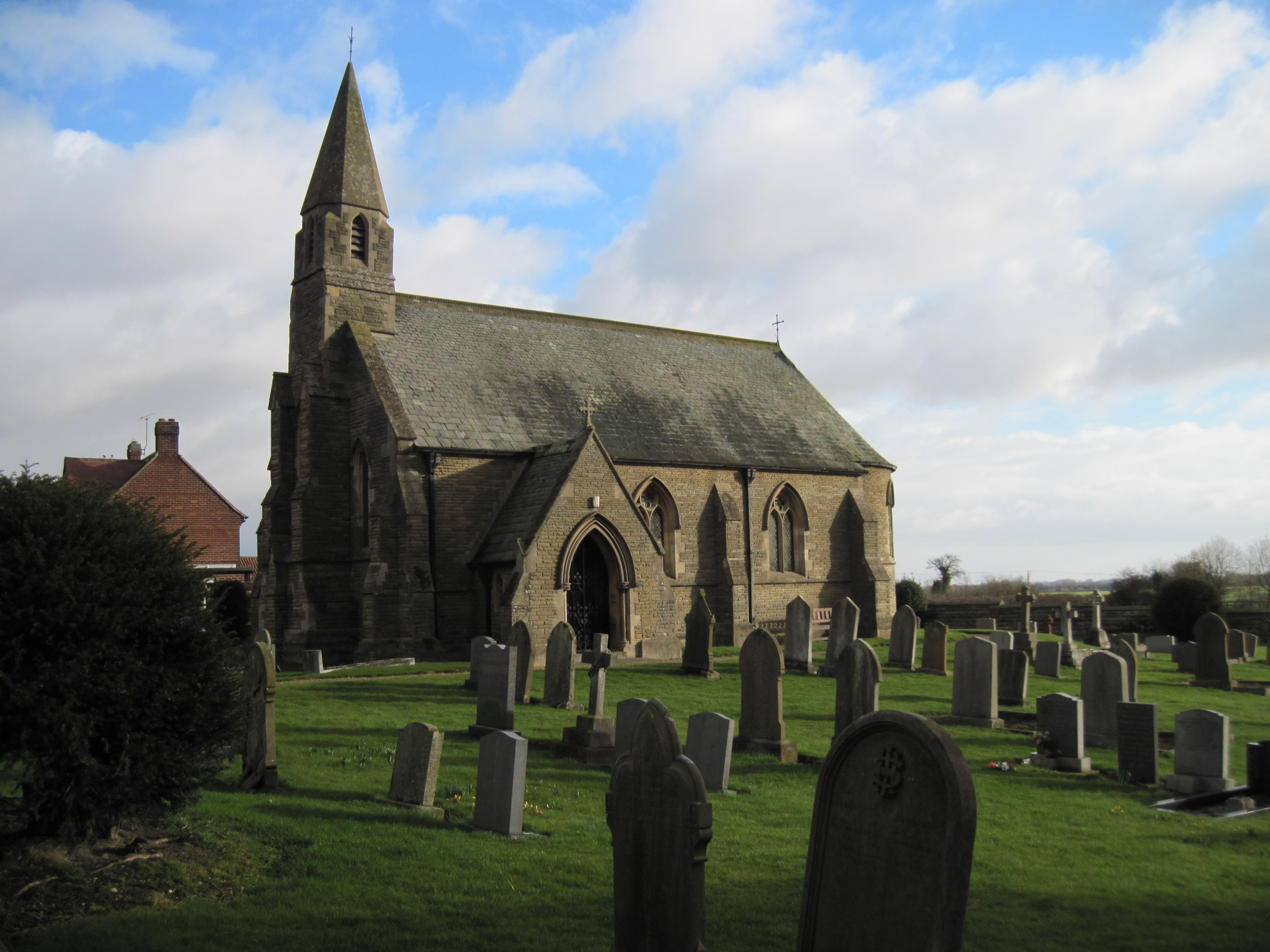
The church, in 2010

St Margaret's Church is the parish church of Beswick, East Riding of Yorkshire, a village in England.

A church was built in Beswick in the Norman period. In 1857, it was described as a "small mean church, with only chancel and nave, and covered with thatch". Most of the windows were lancets, while the font was described as "small and ridiculous". It was demolished in 1871; after the pews and other fittings were removed, the building collapsed. A replacement was constructed to a design by James Fowler, in an early Decorated Gothic style. On completion, it could seat 130 worshippers.

The church is built of small stones, and consists of a nave, apsidal chancel, south porch, north vestry and west tower, supported by buttresses. The tower is topped by a spire, reaching 75 feet (23 m) in total height. Inside, there is a reredos of Caen stone, and the floor is covered with Minton tiles.
