= Kilnwick Old Hall =

Building in the East Riding of Yorkshire, England

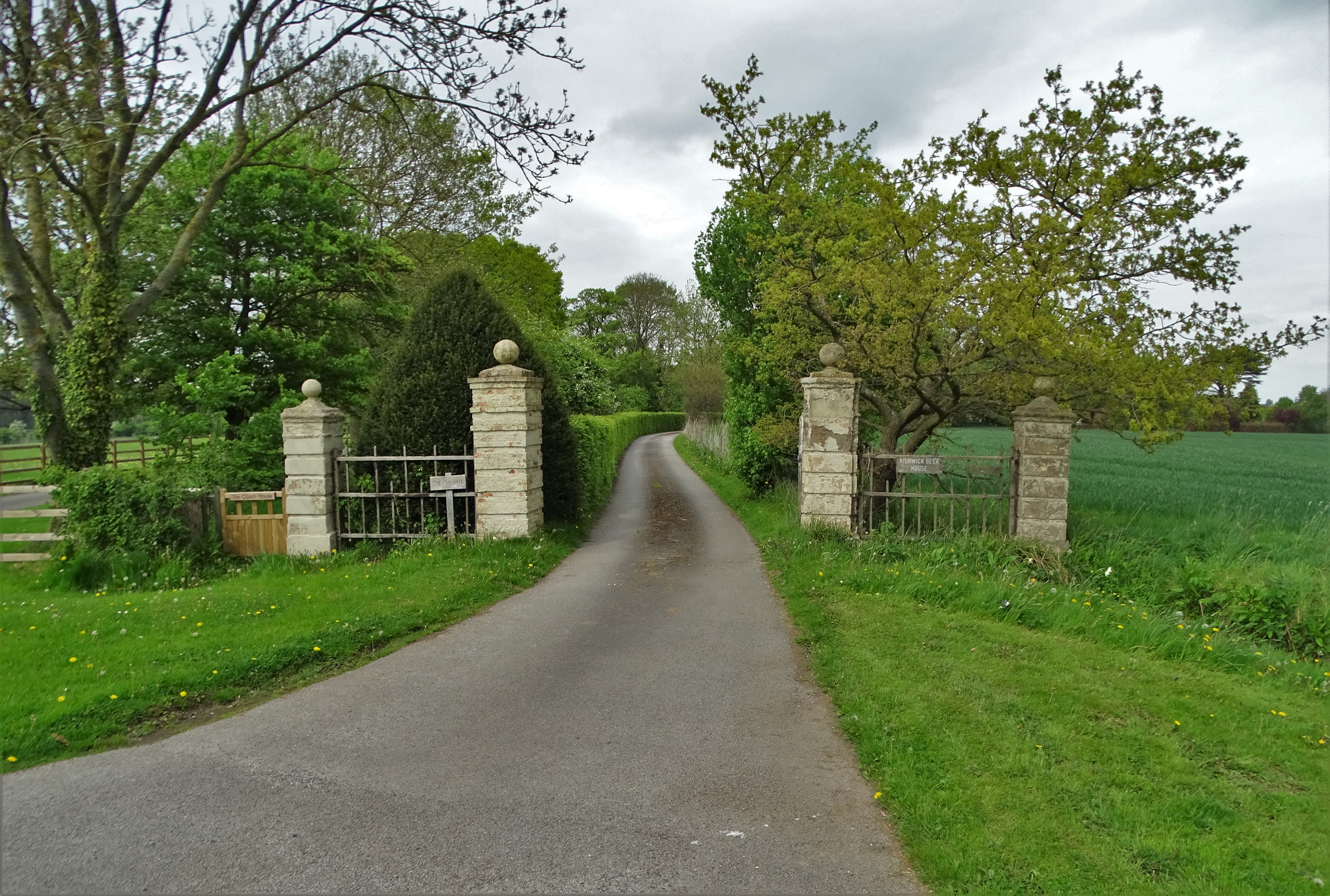
- Gateway to the hall in 2022

- Location within East Riding of Yorkshire

General information
- Location: Wilfholme Road, Kilnwick-on-the-Wolds, East Riding of Yorkshire, England
- Coordinates: 53°56′03″N 0°29′08″W
- Year built: Early 17th century
- Renovated: 1720s (partly rebuilt) c. 1747 (altered)

Renovating team
- Architect: John Carr (c. 1747)

Listed Building – Grade II
- Official name: Kilnwick Old Hall
- Designated: 7 February 1968
- Reference no.: 1346966

Listed Building – Grade II
- Official name: Well head at Kilnwick Old Hall in courtyard on south side
- Designated: 7 February 1968
- Reference no.: 1103444

Listed Building – Grade II
- Official name: Gatepiers to Kilnwick Old Hall
- Designated: 9 February 1987
- Reference no.: 1346967

Listed Building – Grade II
- Official name: Ha-ha to former Kilnwick Old Hall
- Designated: 9 February 1987
- Reference no.: 1103445

Kilnwick Old Hall is a historic building off Wilfholme Road in Kilnwick-on-the-Wolds, a village in the East Riding of Yorkshire, England.

The country house was built in the early 17th century, and was partly reconstructed in the 1720s. In 1747, it was purchased by John Grimston, who undertook further work, then his son, also John, commissioned John Carr to undertake further alterations. This included adding a rear range to the east wing, the replacement of the roofs, the addition of a bay window, and internal plasterwork by Giuseppe Cortese. In the 1780s, Carr redesigned the library. The bulk of the building was demolished in 1951, with the surviving range consisting of former offices. It was Grade II listed in 1968.

The surviving building is constructed of red brick on a moulded plinth, with a dentilled eaves cornice, and hipped stone slate roofs. There are two storeys and attics, and an L-shaped plan, consisting of a south wing of five bays, and an east wing of four bays. The doorways have four-centred arches, and the windows are a mix of mullioned cross windows, casements and sashes, some horizontally sliding. Inside, one first floor room has early plasterwork on its ceiling, while two rooms have early 18th-century panelling.

The well head, gatepiers, and ha‑ha associated with Kilwick Old Hall are each also listed separately at Grade II.

== See also ==
- Listed buildings in Beswick, East Riding of Yorkshire
