= Edmund Fellowes =

English musicologist (1870–1951)

Edmund Horace Fellowes CH MVO (11 November 1870 – 21 December 1951) was an English musicologist who became well known for his work in promoting the revival of sixteenth and seventeenth century English music. Outside of music, he was a Church of England clergyman.

== Life and work ==
Fellowes was born in Paddington, London, on 11 November 1870, the fifth child of Horace Decimus Fellowes, assistant director of the Royal Army Clothing Depot, and his wife Louisa Emily, daughter of Edmund Packe, a captain in the Royal Horse Guards. Fellowes showed musical ability at an early age and in 1878 received an offer from Joseph Joachim to become his violin pupil; the offer was not taken up and Fellowes went to Winchester College. He studied as an undergraduate at Oriel College, Oxford, from 1889 to 1892, taking a fourth class in theology and becoming a Bachelor of Music and Master of Arts in 1896.

Fellowes became an ordained deacon in 1894 and priest in 1895, and held a curacy in Wandsworth, after which he became precentor of Bristol Cathedral in 1897. On 12 January 1899 he married Lilian Louisa, a daughter of Admiral Sir Richard Vesey Hamilton. He was a minor canon of St. George's Chapel, Windsor from 1900 to 1951, and from 1924 to 1927, he was in charge of the choir following the death of the conductor Sir Walter Parratt.

Fellowes' passion for mid-16th century – mid-17th century music led him to edit thirty-six volumes of madrigals, thirty-two volumes of lute songs, and twenty volumes of William Byrd's music. He was one of the editors of Tudor Church Music, ten volumes published by Oxford University Press in the 1920s with the support of the Carnegie UK Trust. His work covered not only the music, but important biographical and critical writing such as The English Madrigal Composers, published in 1921 and William Byrd, published in 1936. Fellowes was honorary librarian of St. Michael's College, Tenbury from 1918 until 1948, and during this time he arranged and catalogued the musical library of Sir Frederick Ouseley. He was succeeded in this post by Watkins Shaw.

Fellowes' works were recognised by his alma mater and he was appointed an honorary fellow of Oriel in 1937. He also received honorary doctorates in music from Dublin University in 1917, Oxford University in 1939, and Cambridge University in 1950. Fellowes was interested in cricket, and in 1930, he published History of Winchester Cricket. He was appointed a Member of the Royal Victorian Order in 1931 and in 1944 he became a Member of the Order of the Companions of Honour. He was president of the Musical Association from 1942 until 1947, where he aided them in securing a Royal affiliation, and president of the Church Music Society from 1946 until 1951, following on from Archbishop Lang. Fellowes died at 12 Clarence Road, Clewer Within, Windsor, on 21 December 1951.

Fellowes' editions of English Tudor church music represent a very significant contribution to 20th Century musical scholarship, bringing to new prominence composers such as Byrd and Orlando Gibbons, whose work was thus made accessible to composers and scholars, notably Ralph Vaughan Williams, whose revision of The English Hymnal was influenced by study of these themes in Fellowes' editions. He lectured extensively on the subject, travelling numerous times to the United States for this purpose. His was the foremost work in the Anglican Tudor music revival of the early 20th Century. The musicologist Richard Turbet cautions, that while "His writings are always worth consideration [they] need to be read with an eye to the state of knowledge and the opinions prevalent at the time".

Other interests included cricket, writing A History of Winchester Cricket, and music performance, titling his memoirs the Memoirs of an Amateur Musician.

== Correspondence ==
Oriel College, Oxford, maintains a collection of his papers that includes a letter to his mother relating his eyewitness account of Queen Victoria's funeral, his work on Tudor Church Music, letters from Adrian Boult, Edward Elgar, Gustav Holst, Herbert Howells, Hubert Parry, John Stainer, Charles Villiers Stanford, Leopold Stokowski, Ralph Vaughan Williams, Henry Walford Davies, and Henry Wood.

The St George's Chapel Archives, Windsor Castle, maintains several collections, including letters to him from Sir Henry Walford Davies 1924–1930, H. C. Colles 1931 and C. Hylton Stewart 1929; the Fellowes Collection, including his private papers and ephemera from his life and work at St George's Chapel, Windsor Castle; and a collection of gramophone recordings and sheet music belonging to Fellowes. Other records of his work on the monograph series and as a minor canon of Windsor are available.

The Bodleian Library: Music Library on Broad Street, Oxford maintains correspondence including letters to Frederick Ouseley, formerly "The Tenbury Collection" at St. Michael's College, Tenbury.

== Publications ==
- Appendix with Supplementary Notes
- English Cathedral Music, 1941, revised J. A. Westrup – Publisher: London, Methuen, 1969. ISBN 0-416-14850-6
- English Cathedral Music from Edward the Sixth to Edward the Seventh
- English Madrigal Composers
- English Madrigal School
- English Madrigal Verse, 1588–1632
- English School of Lutenist Song Writers – Publisher: Boston : Music Library Association, c1984. ISBN 0-914954-30-X
- Orlando Gibbons and His Family: The Last of the Tudor School of Musicians
- Tudor Church Music
- William Byrd – English Church Music, Vol. 1
- William Byrd: A Short Account of His Life and Work
- The Knights of the Garter, 1348–1939: With a Complete List of the Stall Plates in St. Georges Chapel. Historical monographs relating to St. George's Chapel, Windsor Castle Volume 1. (SPCK – 1939)
- Organists and Masters of the Choristers of St. George's Chapel in Windsor Castle. Historical monographs relating to St. George's Chapel, Windsor Castle Volume 3. (1939)
- The Military Knights of Windsor, 1352–1944. Historical monographs relating to St. George's Chapel, Windsor Castle Volume 4. (1944)
- The Vicars Or Minor Canons of His Majesty's Free Chapel of St. George in Windsor. Historical monographs relating to St. George's Chapel, Windsor Castle Volume 5. (1945)
- The Baptism, Marriage and Burial Registers of St George's Chapel, Windsor Historical monographs relating to St. George's Chapel, Windsor Castle Volume 10., (1957).
