= Bainton, East Riding of Yorkshire =

Village and civil parish in the East Riding of Yorkshire, England

Coordinates: 53.957768°N 0.532097°W

Bainton
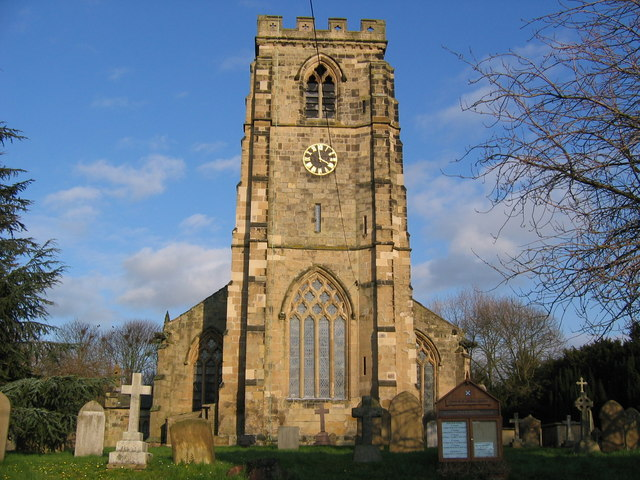
- St Andrew's Church, Bainton in 2007

- Location within the East Riding of Yorkshire
- Population: 334 (2011 census)
- OS grid reference: SE964522
  - London: 170 mi (270 km) S
- Civil parish: Bainton
- Unitary authority: East Riding of Yorkshire
- Ceremonial county: East Riding of Yorkshire
- Region: Yorkshire and the Humber
- Country: England
- Sovereign state: United Kingdom
- Post town: DRIFFIELD
- Postcode district: YO25
- Dialling code: 01377
- Police: Humberside
- Fire: Humberside
- Ambulance: Yorkshire
- UK Parliament: Bridlington and The Wolds

Bainton is a village and civil parish in the East Riding of Yorkshire, England. It is situated approximately 6 miles (10 km) south-west of Driffield on the A614 road.

According to the 2011 UK census, Bainton parish had a population of 334, an increase on the 2001 UK census figure of 282. The parish covers an area of 1,608.08 hectares (3,973.7 acres).

The name Bainton derives from the Old English beagaingtūn meaning 'settlement connected with Beaga'.

Bainton was served by Bainton railway station on the Selby to Driffield Line between 1890 and 1954.

Bainton Grade I listed Anglican church is dedicated to St Andrew. Pevsner noted that the church was totally rebuilt in the 1330s or 1340s by the rector William de Brocklesby, except for the south-west corner of the chancel with its priest's doorway, which are c. 1300. Until 1715 the tower supported a spire. The font is Norman, and the pews 18th century. A tomb to Sir Edmund de Mauley lies in the south aisle; [de Mauley, Steward to Edward II, died at the Battle of Bannockburn in 1314]. The tomb has an ogee canopy, crocketed gable and flying angels holding the soul of Sir Edmund in a napkin. There is also a brass to Roger Godeale, died 1429. A south porch and vestry were added by Henry Wheatley in 1843, and a restoration carried out by "Fowler of Louth" in 1866. The church's listed rectory, south of the church, is of late Georgian period. According to Pevsner a local tradition connects the rectory's coniferous garden with Paxton The rectory's coach house and stables are also listed buildings.

== See also ==
- Listed buildings in Bainton, East Riding of Yorkshire
