= Great Carlton =

Village and civil parish in the East Lindsey district of Lincolnshire, England

Coordinates: 53.343975°N 0.118298°E

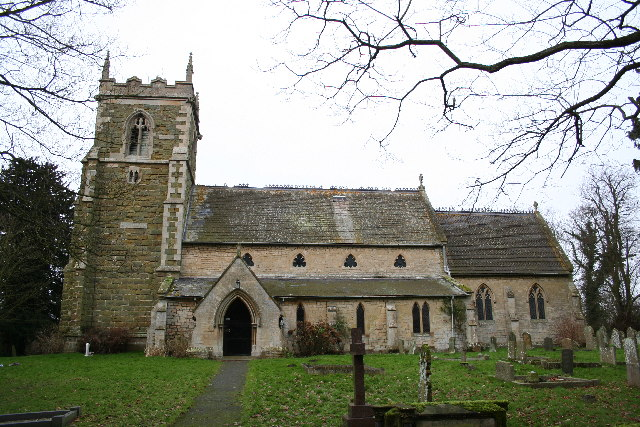
- Church of St John the Baptist, Great Carlton

- Location within Lincolnshire
- Population: 136 (2011)
- OS grid reference: TF411851
  - London: 125 mi (201 km) S
- District: East Lindsey
- Shire county: Lincolnshire
- Region: East Midlands
- Country: England
- Sovereign state: United Kingdom
- Post town: Louth
- Postcode district: LN11
- Police: Lincolnshire
- Fire: Lincolnshire
- Ambulance: East Midlands
- UK Parliament: Louth and Horncastle

Great Carlton is a village and civil parish in the East Lindsey district of Lincolnshire, England. The population of the civil parish at the 2011 census was 136. It is situated 5 miles (8.0 km) southeast from the market town of Louth, Lincolnshire.

Great Carlton is listed in the 1086 Domesday Book as "Magna Carleton". The name Carlton derives from the Old English 'Ceorlatun' meaning "the village of the free peasants", from the word 'ceorl' meaning "free peasant". There was a market granted to Great Carlton in 1275.

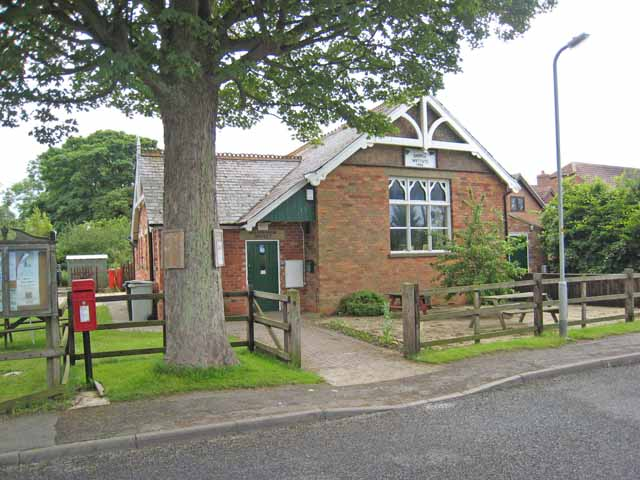
Great Carlton Village Hall

The parish church is dedicated to Saint John the Baptist, and was largely rebuilt in 1861 by James Fowler in 13th-century style, although it retains its 15th-century Perpendicular tower. It is a Grade II listed building.

A notable land owner and freeman of Great Carlton was George Smith, father of Captain John Smith (1580–1631); the same John Smith who acquired great fame as President of the Virginia Company at Jamestown in North America. John Smith was likely born in this village on his father's farm, but his parents (mother Alice Rickard) had to travel south to St. Helena's Parish Church in Willoughby by Alford for his infant baptism on Saturday, 9 Jan 1580. George leased other property from Lord Willoughby de Eresby. Alice Rickard Smith descended from the Rickards of Great Heck, South Yorkshire.

The Grade II listed church lychgate dates from 1871 and was erected by Canon Pretyman.

Great Carlton Church of England School was founded in 1716 as Great Carlton Free School. It later became a National School, and by 1906 it was known as Great Carlton School. It closed in the summer of 1976.
