= Cammeringham =

Village and civil parish in the West Lindsey district of Lincolnshire, England

Coordinates: 53.327885°N 0.57775°W

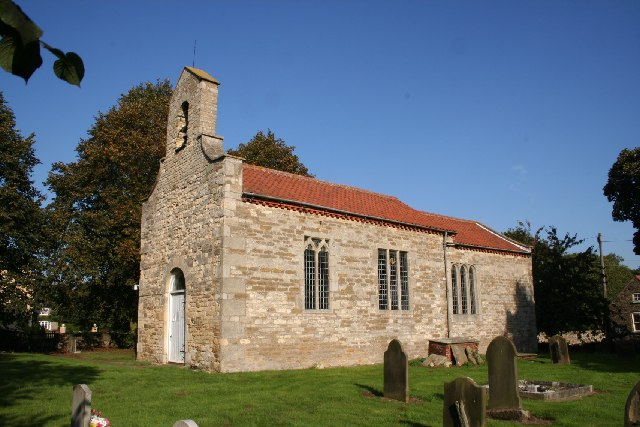
- Church of St Michael, Cammeringham

- Location within Lincolnshire
- Population: 127 (2011)
- OS grid reference: SK948821
  - London: 120 mi (190 km) S
- District: West Lindsey
- Shire county: Lincolnshire
- Region: East Midlands
- Country: England
- Sovereign state: United Kingdom
- Post town: Lincoln
- Postcode district: LN1
- Police: Lincolnshire
- Fire: Lincolnshire
- Ambulance: East Midlands
- UK Parliament: Gainsborough

Cammeringham is a village and civil parish in the West Lindsey district of Lincolnshire, England. It is situated 6 miles (10 km) north of Lincoln, and just off the A15 road near RAF Scampton. According to the 2001 census the village had a population of 123, increasing slightly to 127 at the 2011 census.

Cammeringham Grade II* listed Anglican church is dedicated to St Michael. St Michael's is a remnant of a much larger church; arches from the earlier building are embedded into its aisle wall, and the west doorway has a pre-Conquest knotwork sill. The graveyard holds ancient graves hollowed out of rock.

Within the parish was the Praemonstratensian Cammeringham Priory, founded by Richard de Haya about 1160 as an alien cell to the Abbey of Blanchelande in Normandy. The priory and its rights was sold in 1396 to the Cistercian Abbot of Hulton in Staffordshire.

John de Bothby, Lord Chancellor of Ireland, who died in about 1383, is recorded as owning a manor at Cammeringham.

RAF Ingham was renamed RAF Cammeringham in 1944. The airfield is now disused and derelict.
