= James Fowler (architect) =

English church architect

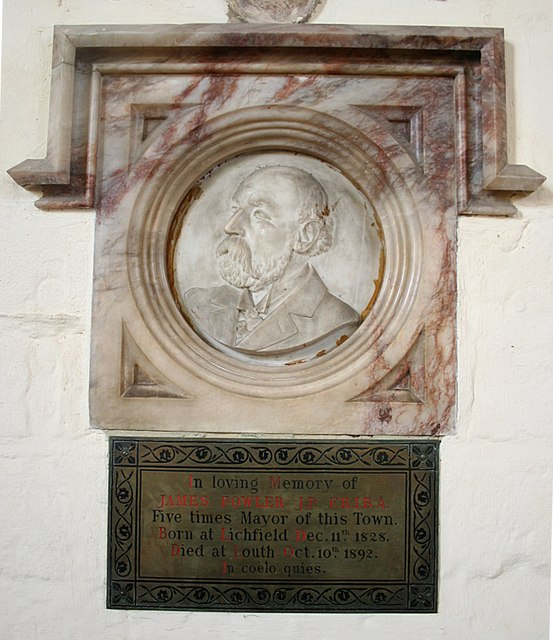
- James Fowler memorial in St James' Church, Louth
- Born: 11 December 1828; Lichfield, England
- Died: 10 October 1892 (aged 63); Louth, England
- Occupation: Architect

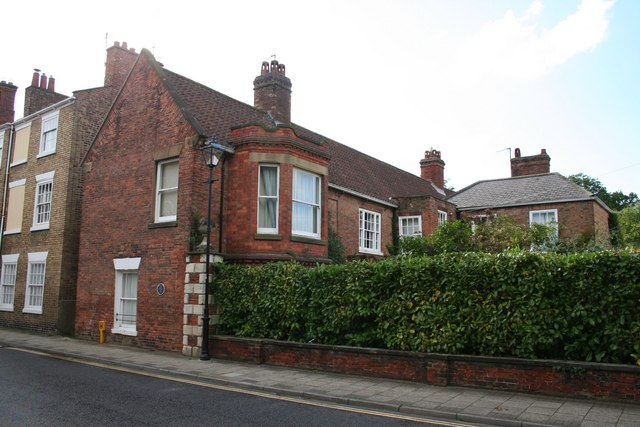
Fowler's house on Westgate in Louth

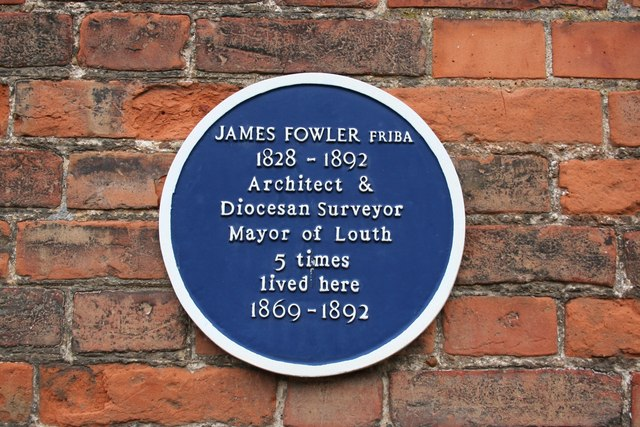
Blue Plaque on the side elevation of Fowler's home in Louth

James Fowler JP FRIBA (11 December 1828 – 10 October 1892), known as 'Fowler of Louth', is best known as a Victorian English church architect and associated with the restoration and renovation of churches. However, he was also the architect of a wide variety of other buildings. A listing of his work compiled in 1991 traced over 210 buildings that he designed or restored. He is known to be the architect for 24 new churches and his work also included 40 vicarages or rectories, 13 schools, four almshouses, a Savings Bank, a convalescent home and hospital as well as country houses and estate housing. Most of Fowler’s work was in Lincolnshire and particularly around Louth, but he also worked in the East Riding of Yorkshire, Nottinghamshire, Staffordshire, Suffolk, London, Sussex and Devon.

== Career and architectural practice ==
Fowler was born in Lichfield. He was a pupil of Lichfield architect Joseph Potter junior. He came to Louth in 1849, when he was employed in the construction of the Louth House of Correction (demolished 1885). He was probably working for James Sandby Padley, who was the County Surveyor for the Lincolnshire parts of Lindsey. He undertook other work for Padley, including illustrations of the Lincoln Greyfriars in Padley's Selections from the Ancient Monastic Ecclesiastical and Domestic edifices of Lincolnshire which was published in 1851. At Louth he was initially in partnership with Joseph Maughan, a surveyor and lithographer in Grimsby. The partnership lasted from 1851 until June 1859. On dissolution, it was agreed that the Surveying Department will hereafter be conducted by Mr. Maughan, and the Architectural Department by Mr. Fowler, at their usual places of business in both towns (Grimsby and Louth). Fowler had probably continued the practice of Charles John Carter, a Louth architect and surveyor, who had died in 1851.

Fowler was elected FRIBA in 1864. Amongst his pupils was Ernest William Farebrother, an architect who worked in Grimsby. He was a Surveyor for the Diocese of Lincoln between 1871 and 1886, and was for five terms the mayor of Louth. The Grimsby architect John James Cresswell worked as an articled assistant and then principal assistant to Fowler between 1877 and 1884.

== Works ==
=== Domestic buildings ===
==== Houses ====
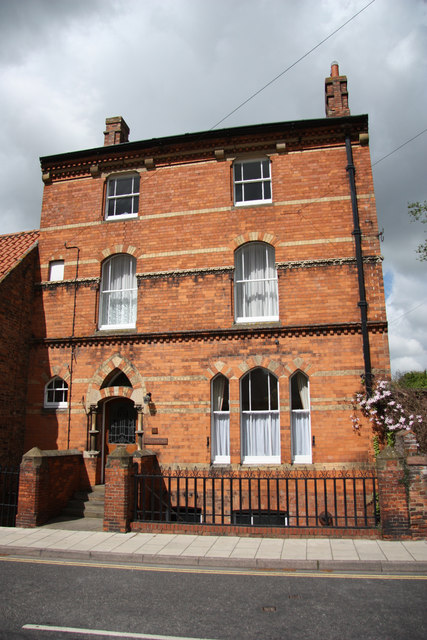
Riversmead, Louth by Fowler 1862

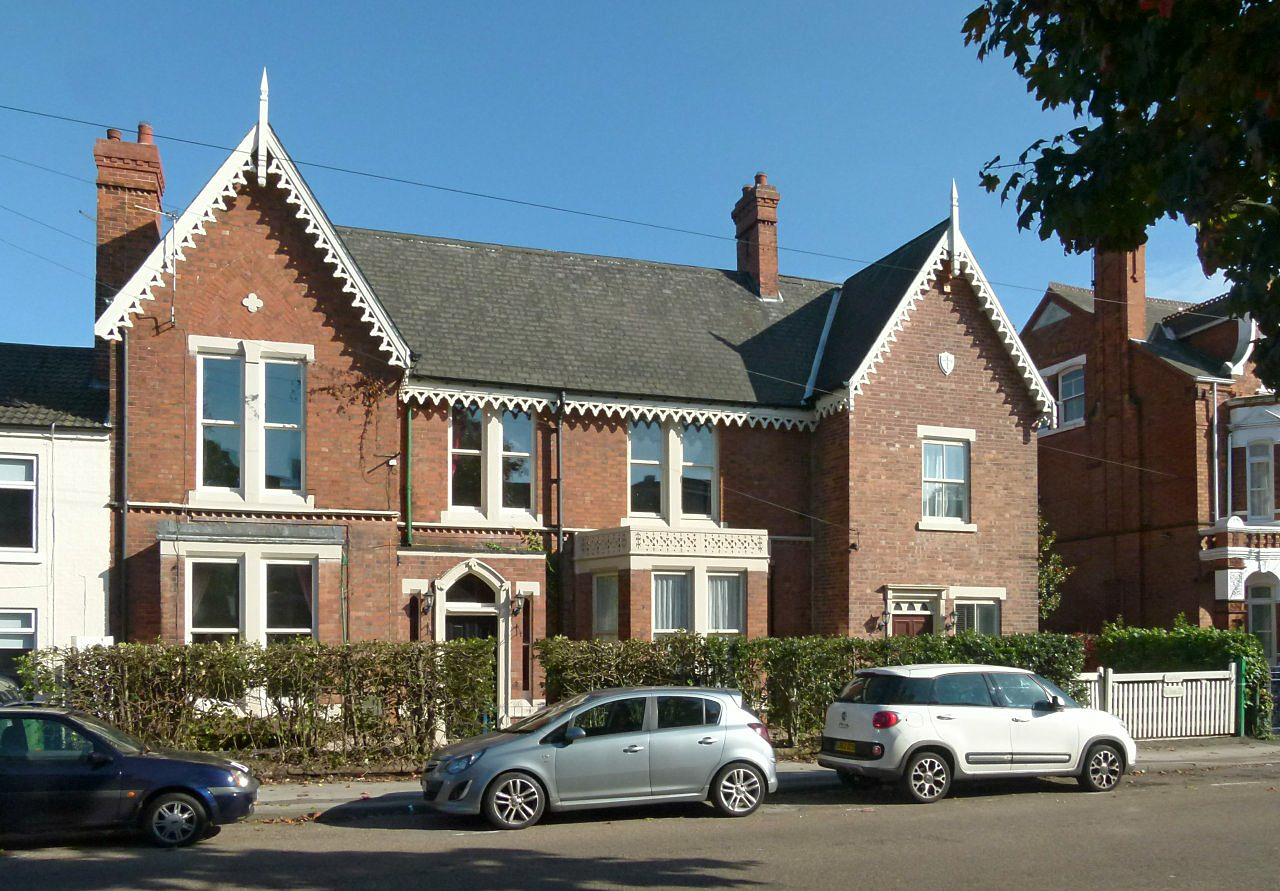
Lorne House, Queen Street

- Dalby – Dalby Hall (1856)
- Louth. Riversmead (1862). An example of a town house by Fowler: contrasting polychrome brickwork with banding and decorative voussoirs, typical Gothic arched entrance.
- Market Rasen – Grammar School, Headmaster's house (1863)
- Langton-by-Partney – Langton Hall (1869)
- Stamford – Browne's Hospital (1870)
- Stamford – Warden's House (ca. 1870)
- Trinity Estates, West Retford. In the 1870s Fowler laid out housing for the Trinity Hospital in Reford. An example of his designs is Lorne House, Queen Street.

==== Rectories and vicarages ====
- Alford, Lincolnshire – Rectory (1852)
- Amcotts – Rectory (1882 and 1888)
- Frodingham vicarage, now Scunthorpe Museum (1874)
- Goxhill – The Old Vicarage (1872–73)
- Gunness – The Old Rectory (1864–66)
- Gunness – Stable block (1864–66)
- Hatton – Old Rectory (1871); red brick, like the church.
- Irby – Old Rectory (1883)
- Odstock, Wiltshire – Old Rectory (1869)
- Redbourne – The Old Vicarage and Coach House (1861)
- Ruckland – Rectory (1856)
- Utterby – Rectory (1863)
- Waddingham – Old Stainton (was The Old Rectory) (1860).
- West Butterwick – The Old Vicarage (1863)
- Willoughby – Rectory (1875)
- Withcall – Old Rectory (1869)
- Wroot – Rectory (1878)

==== Almshouses ====
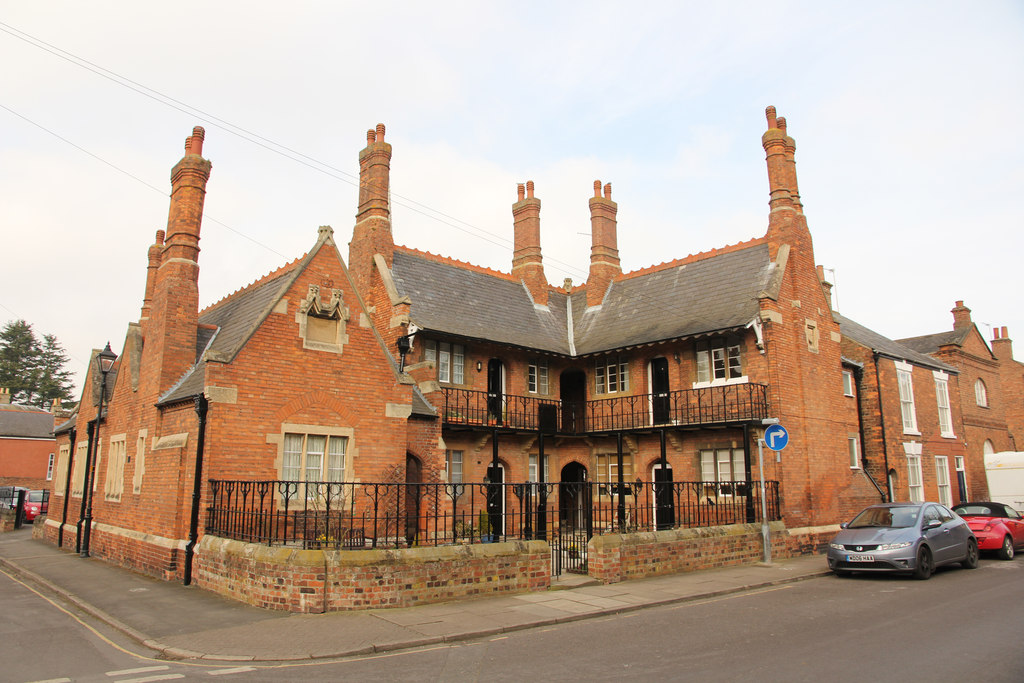
Bedehouses, Louth

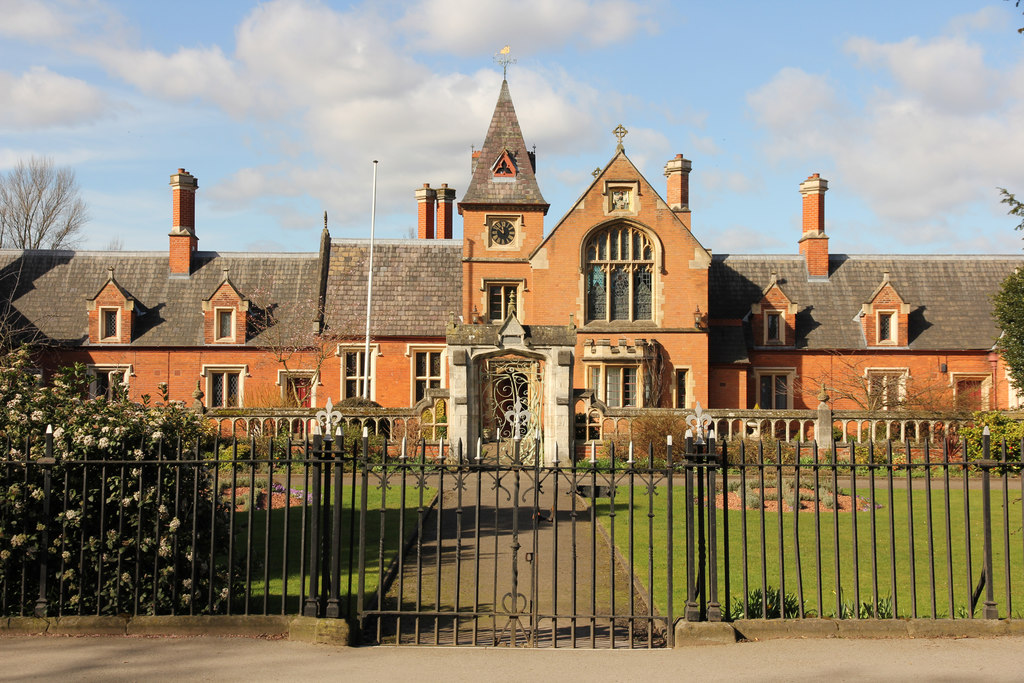
Holy Trinity Hospital, West Retford,1872

- Louth – Orme Almshouses (1885)
- Louth, Bedehouses Gospelgate. Almshouses on Gospelgate, founded in 1551 and sometimes referred to as King Edward VI's Hospital or Our Lady Bede House as the land formerly belonged to the Guild of St. Mary. The current Grade II listed neo-Tudor building by Fowler in 1868–69.
- Fotherby – Allenby Almshouses (1869)
- Browne's Hospital, Stamford. 1870. Largely rebuilt by Fowler. Only the south range and part of the west cloister are by Fowler, who rebuilt the rest around an enlarged courtyard.
- Holy Trinity Hospital, West Retford. In 1832–4 the present hospital was built to the design of Edward Blore. In 1872, Fowler (who had earlier worked on West Retford Church) was commissioned to design a new chapel and audit room. This was added to the centre of the building and at the ground floor, reusing the former common room and converting the space into a chapel. He also added the clock tower.

=== Schools ===
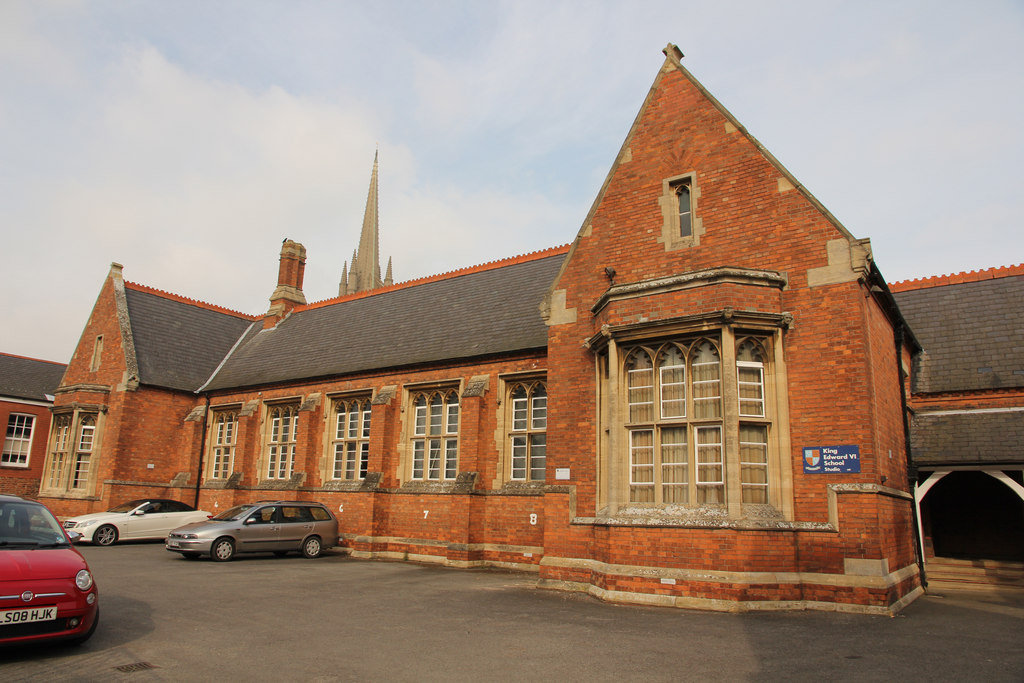
King Edward VI Grammar School, Louth 1868

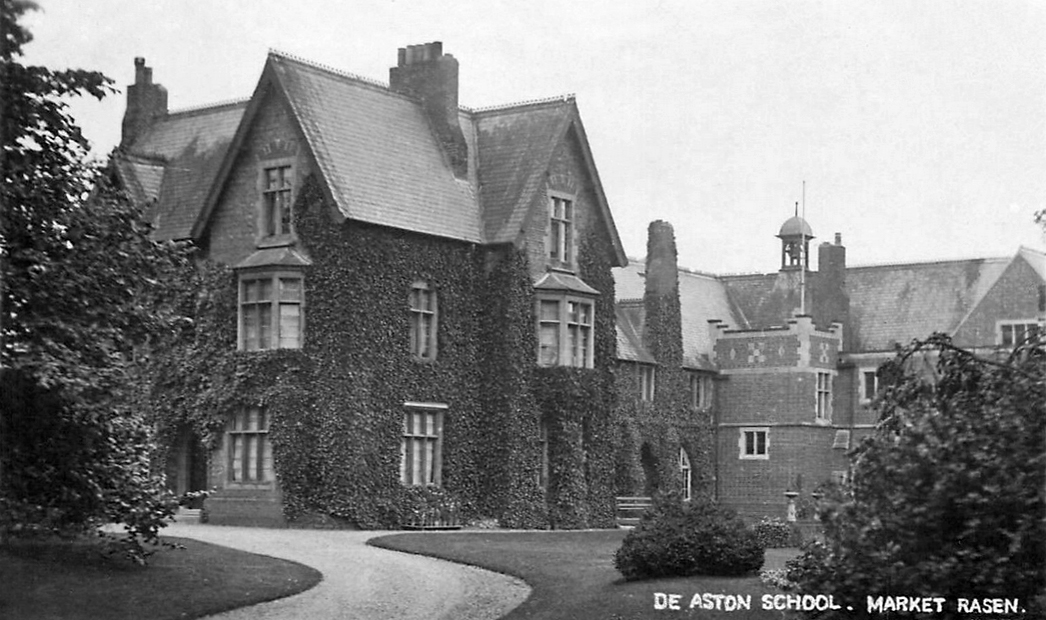
De Aston Grammar School, Market Rasen 1861–3

- Caistor – Caistor Primary School and School House (1859–60)
- East Ravendale – School
- Louth – parts of Edward VI Grammar School (1866)
- Market Rasen – De Aston School (1862), red brick headmaster's house with associated school buildings

=== Public buildings ===
- Grimsby – Town Hall (1861–63). Constructed to designs by Bellamy and Hardy of Lincoln and the London architect John Giles. Fowler acted as superintending architect during construction.
- Horncastle High Street – Corn Exchange by Maugham and Fowler (1855). Erected in 1856 at a cost of about £3500, was a handsome edifice of brick with stone facings, and included a newsroom, a mechanics' institute with a library, and a hall for assemblies, concerts, and lectures. Later converted into the Victory Cinema.
- Louth, Lincolnshire – Police station (1865)

=== Shops ===
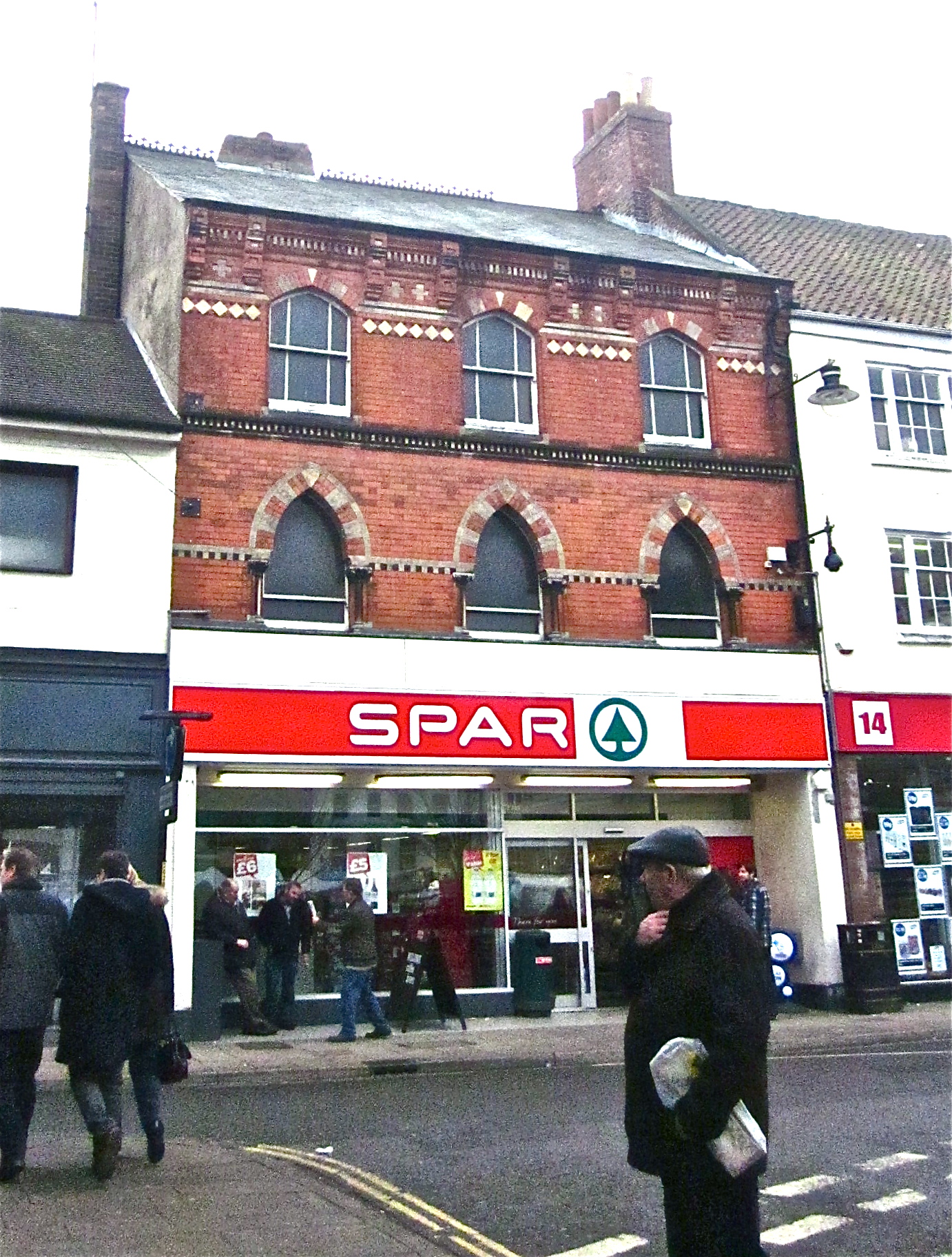
15 Market place, Louth, Lincolnshire

- 15 Market Place, Louth, c.1865. Venetian Gothic Revival derived style with polychrome decorated brick facade. Now in retail use.

== Churches ==
=== New or completely rebuilt churches, arranged by date of construction ===
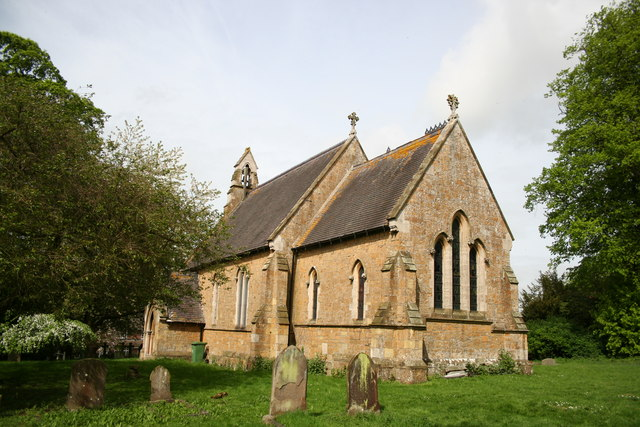
St Martin's church, East Ravendale, Lincs.

- East Ravendale, St. Martin (1857)
- Winceby, St Margaret (1860). Now demolished.
- Wold Newton, All Hallows (1862)
- Louth, St Michael (1862–3)
- Frampton, St. Michael (1863).
- Ludford, St Mary & St Peter (1863–5)
- Cleethorpes, St Peter (1864–66)
- Snitterby, St Nicholas (1866)
- Lichfield, St Mary (1868–70)
- Lincoln, St Swithin's (1869–87). Nikolaus Pevsner described this as "without doubt his most important church."
- Binbrook, Ss Mary and Gabriel (1869)
- Hatton, St Stephen (1870). According to Pevsner this is one of Fowler's more satisfying small churches. Red brick with bands of stone.
- Beswick, St Margaret

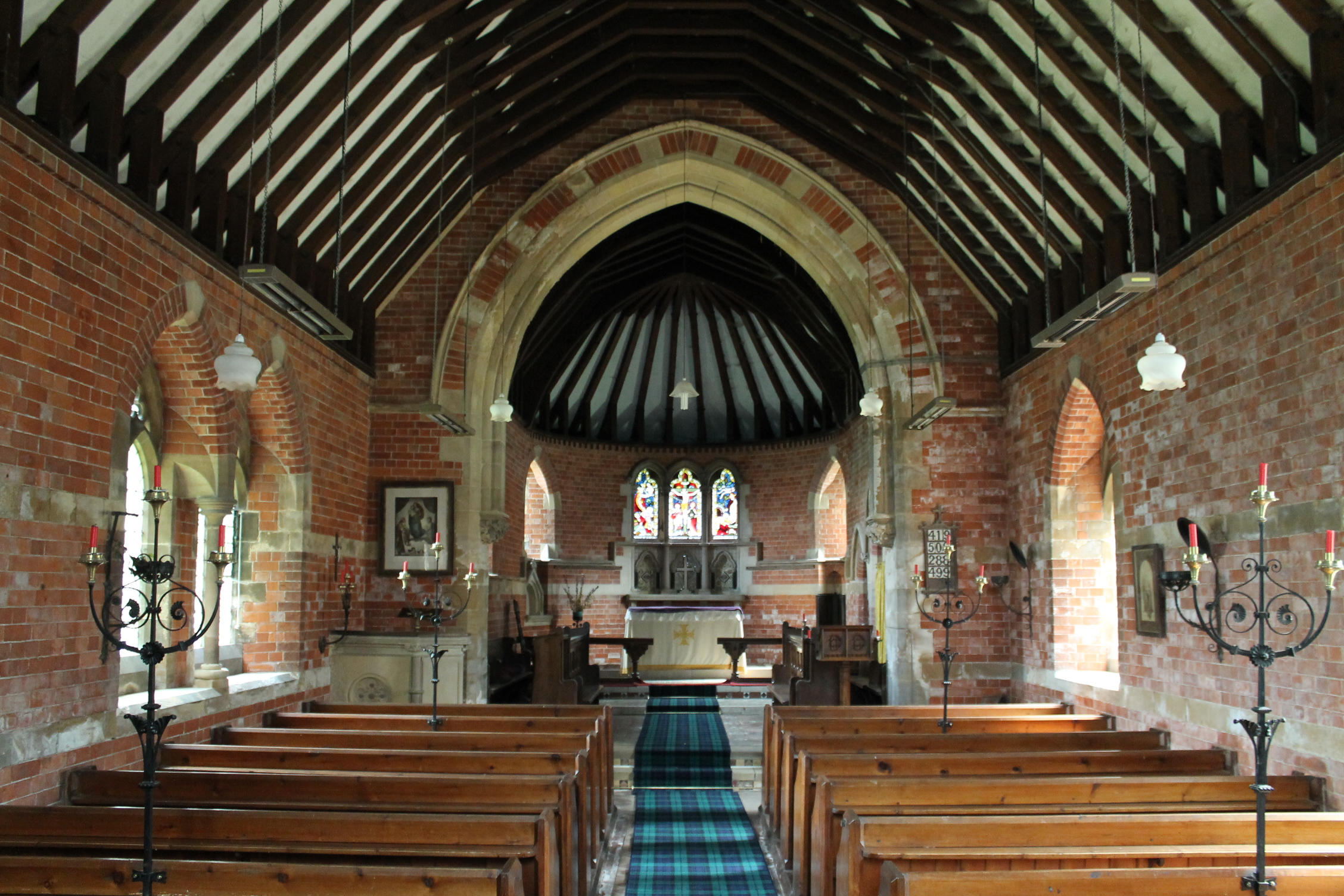
Interior, St Stephens church, Hatton

- London, Kenley, All Saints (1870–72)
- Newington, St Mary (1886)
- Temple Bruer, St John (1874)
- Spridlington, St Hilary (1875)
- Moorhouses, St Laurence (1875)
- Denmead, All Saints (1880; with C.R. Pink)
- Alford Cemetery Chapel and curator's lodge (1881). The buildings are joined by a Gothic archway for carriages. The floor is laid with Minton's ornamental tiles, the interior walls are of red brick to the moulded string course, and mixture above, with Gothic panelled arches. There is a bell turret with a bell of 75lb weight.
- Sutton-in-Ashfield, St Michael and All Angels', Nottinghamshire (1887) (chancel only)

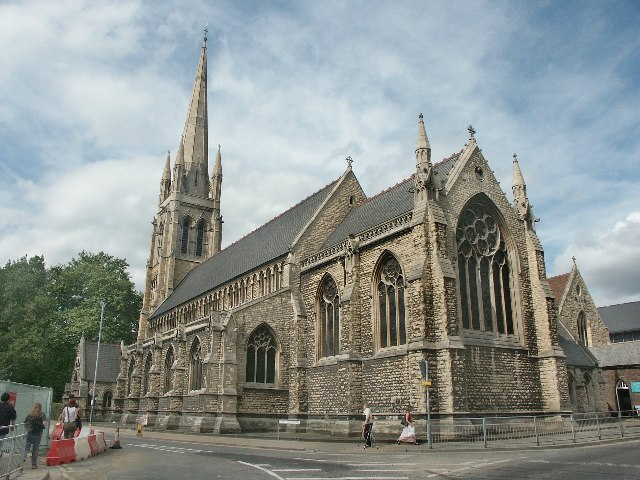
St Swithin's church, Lincoln

=== Renovated and partially rebuilt churches ===
- Benington, Lincolnshire – All Saints (1873)

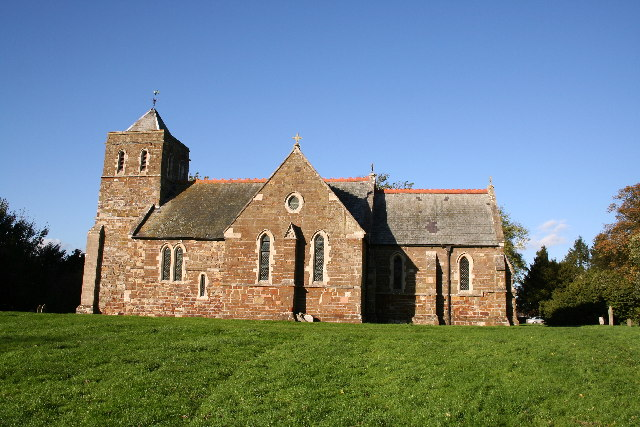
St.Julian's church, Benniworth, Lincs.

- Benniworth, St Julian
- Blyborough, St Alkmund (1877–88)
- Brattleby, St Cuthbert (1858)
- Clarborough, St John the Baptist
- Bucknall, St Margaret (1884)
- Claxby – St Mary (1871)
- Colsterworth, St John Baptist (1876)
- Croxton, St John the Evangelist (1876)
- Cuxwold, St Nicholas (1860)
- Dalby – St Lawrence and Bishop Edward King (1862)
- East Halton, St Peter (1868)
- Edlington, St Helen (1859–60)

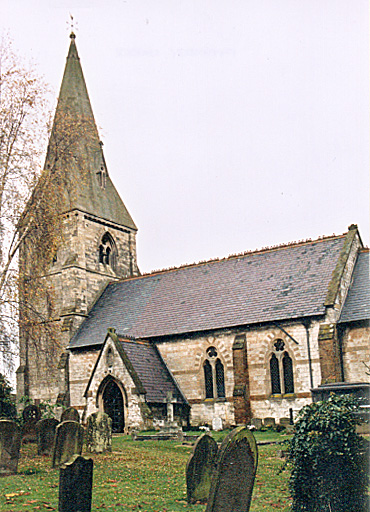
St Mary's Church, Fotherby

- Fotherby, St Mary (1863)
- Frampton, St Michael (1863)
- Gedney Hill, Holy Trinity (1875)
- Grayingham, St Radegund (1870)

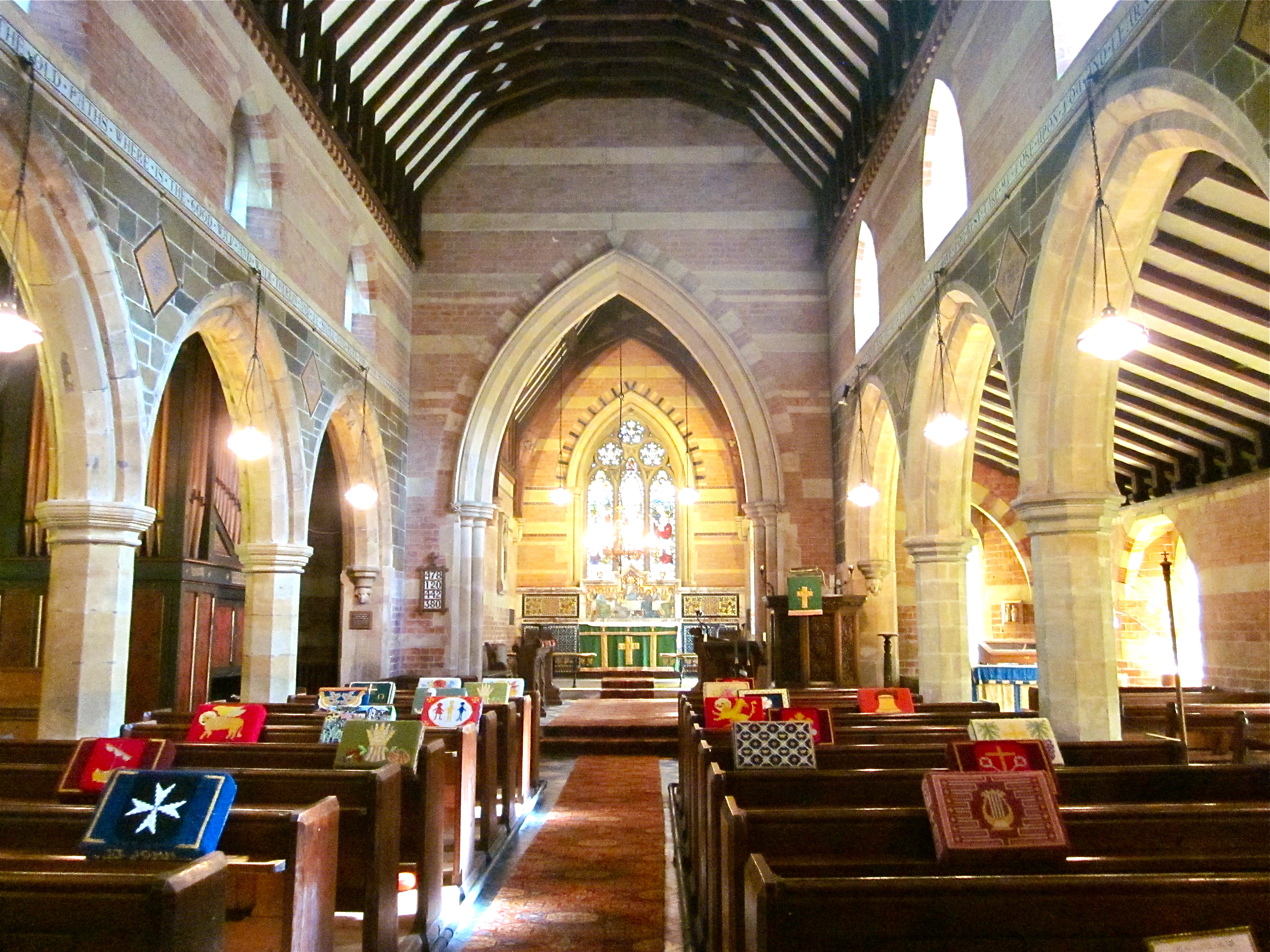
Great Carlton Church, Lincs.

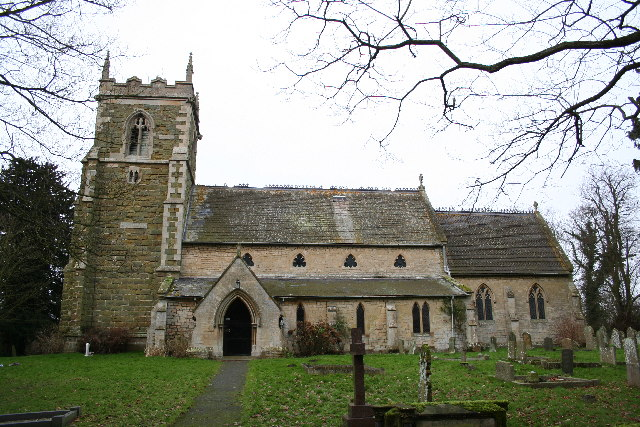
St.John the Baptist's church, Great Carlton, Lincs.

- Great Carlton – Church of St John Baptist (1860)
- Grimsby – Church of Holy Trinity and Holy Mary (1878)
- Gunby – Church of St Peter (1868–70)
- Hagworthingham, Holy Trinity (1859)
- Halton Holegate, St Andrew (1866)
- Healing, St Peter and St Paul (1874–76)
- Heckington, St Andrew (1887–88)
- Hibaldstow, St Hybald (1875)
- Irby, Saint Andrew (1883)
- Laceby, Saint Margaret (1883)
- Lenton – St Peter (1879)
- Leverton St Helen (1892)
- Louth, St James (1861–69)
- Ludborough, St Mary (1858)
- Ludford Magna, St Mary and St Peter (1864)
- Market Deeping, St Guthlac, 1875 or 1878
- Market Rasen, St Thomas (1862)
- Mavis Enderby, St Michael (1875)
- Miningsby, St Andrew (1878). Demolished 1980.
- Moorby, All Saints (1866), Demolished 1983.
- Muckton, Holy Trinity (1878–79) Demolished 1983.
- Nettleton, St John Baptist (1874)
- New Clee, St John (1879)
- Newton by Toft – St Michael (1860)
- Normanby le Wold, St Peter (1868)
- North Coates, St Nicholas (1865)
- Old Bolingbroke, St Peter and St Paul (1890)
- Ranby – St German (1861)
- Rigsby – St James (1863)
- Roxby, St Mary (1875)
- Saltfleetby by St Peter, St Peter (1877)
- Scawby, St Hybald (1870)
- Sixhills, All Saints (1869 and 1875) The major part of this restoration work, in 1869, was by William Watkins (architect) and not by Fowler.
- Skegness – St Clements (1884)
- Skegness, St Matthew (1879–80)
- Snitterby, St Nicholas (1866)
- South Ormsby, St Leonard (1871–72)
- South Reston, St Edith (1864–65)
- Stainfield St Andrew
- Stewton, St Andrew (1886)
- Tealby All Saints (1872)
- Thimbleby – St Margaret (1879)
- Thoresway, St Mary (1879–80)
- Thornton Curtis, St Lawrence (1884)
- Toynton St Peter, St Peter (1876)
- Upton – All Saints (1874–75 and 1880)
- Waithe St Martin, (1861)
- Waltham – Church of All Saints (1867 and 1874)
- Willoughby – St Helen. Chancel rebuilt by Fowler.(1880)
- Wilsthorpe – St Faith (1869)
- Wroot – St Pancras (1878)
- Wyham cum Cadeby All Saints (1886)
- Yarburgh St John the Baptist – restoration, 1854–5

==== Devon ====
- Georgeham, St George (1876)

==== London ====
- Croydon, All Saints (1870–72)

==== Nottinghamshire ====
- Bole – St John Baptist (1874)
- Boughton, St Matthew (1868)
- Nuthall – St Patrick, Nottinghamshire (1884)
- Retford – St Michael the Archangel (1863).

==== Wiltshire ====
- Odstock – St Mary (1870)

==== Yorkshire ====
- Bainton St Andrew (1866)
- Beswick St Margaret (1871)
- Easby – St Agatha (1881)
- Harswell, St Peter (1871)
- Moor Monkton, Yorkshire. All Saints (1879)
- Skipsea, All Saints (1856–60)

==== Cemetery chapels ====
- Grimsby – Cemetery chapels (1854), now demolished
