= Charles John Carter =

English architect and surveyor

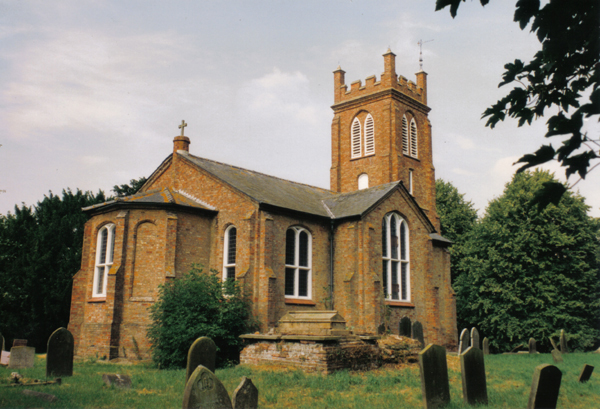
- Eastville parish church, Lincs
- Died: 1851; Louth, Lincolnshire
- Occupation: Architect

Charles John Carter (died 1851) was an architect and surveyor working in Louth, Lincolnshire. Sir Howard Colvin suggests that he may have come to Louth from Brereton in Staffordshire around 1832. Most of the work that he undertook was the building or restoration of churches and designing rectories and vicarages. He also appears to have been closely connected with the laying out and construction of houses at Cleethorpes, following the Clee Inclosure Act 1842 (5 & 6 Vict. c. 1 Pr.). This was a period of rapid development at Cleethorpes, as it developed into a popular sea bathing resort. He had a house in Upgate, Louth and also an office in Westgate, Louth. He was a great collector of antiquities and had an extensive architectural library and collection of drawings. Following his death an auction sale was held of his possessions, which lasted for four days. Following his death, he may have been succeeded in his Louth practice by Maughan and Fowler.

== Architectural work ==
=== Houses ===
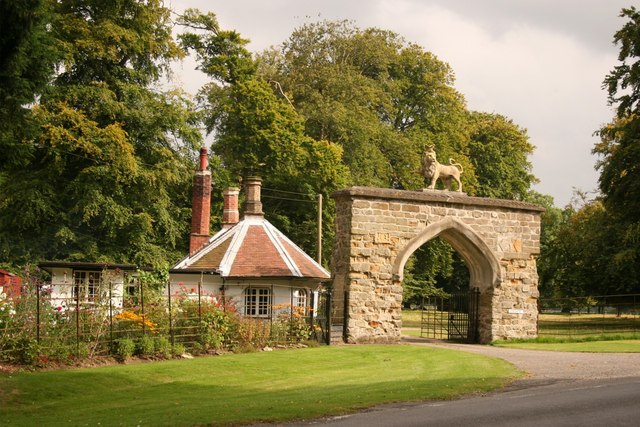
The Lion Gateway

- Scrivelsby Court, Scrivelsby, Lincolnshire. Carter submitted a design for the Lion Gate at Scrivelsby in 1833 which may have resulted in its rebuilding. Also according to John Harris he may have been responsible to alterations following a fire, to the now demolished Scrivelsby Court.
- The Sycamores, Westgate, Louth. (1837). Re-modelled for the Revd. Augustus Hobart-Hampden with shaped gables.

=== Churches ===
- Trinity Church, Louth (1832), but rebuilt in 1866
- Welton-le-Wold (1837-8)
- Ashby-cum-Fenby (1847-8)
- North Thoresby (1848-9)

=== Rectories and Vicarages ===
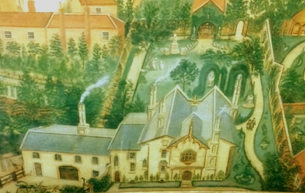
Louth Vicarage from Brown's panorama 1847

- Louth Vicarage (1832). For the Rev. E. R. Mantell. A double-pile house with a forward gable with oriel window and entrance porch set between the two ridges of the piles. Tudoresque half timbering and bargeboards with tall chimney stacks. This one of the earliest examples of Black-and-white Revival architecture in Britain.
- Little Carlton (1833)
- Gayton-le-Marsh (1834)
- Welton-le-Wold (1834)
- Burgh on Bain (1834)
- Milton Ernest, Bedfordshire (1835).
- Eastville (1839–40) Vicarage. Opposite church. Yellow brick with doorway with Gothic detail. Tudor detail, but essentially classical with deep eaves.

=== School ===
Eastville (1839–40).

=== Development of Cleethorpes ===
Carter would appear to have been very active in the early layout and development of Cleethorpes as a sea bathing resort bathing resort. The following advertisement appeared in the Lincolnshire Chronicle on Friday 27 September 1844 BUILDING GROUND at CLEETHORPES, delightful Sea Bathing Place on the Coast of Lincolnshire. SEVERAL PLOTS of GROUND, of various sizes, in the most eligible situation at this much frequented and improving Watering-place, will shortly be disposed of by Sale or Let on Building Leases to suit the convenience of persons requiring the same. The facility of communication with Cleethorpes by coaches from Nottingham, Lincoln, Stamford, and Boston, and from Leeds and other parts of Yorkshire by railroad and daily steamers, is sufficiently well known. Information respecting the said Plots of Land may be immediately obtained from Mr. C. J. Carter, Architect, Louth, who is engaged in arranging the same, and is authorised to treat with parties for the disposal thereof.— All letters must be post paid.

== Literature ==
- Antram N (revised), Pevsner N & Harris J, (1989), The Buildings of England: Lincolnshire, Yale University Press.
- Colvin H. A (1995), Biographical Dictionary of British Architects 1600-1840. Yale University Press, 3rd edition London, pg.485.
- Robinson D and Sturman C.(2001), William Brown and the Louth Panorama, Louth. ISBN 9780953953301
