= All Saints' Church, Kilnwick =

Church in the East Riding of Yorkshire, England

Coordinates: 53.93220°N 0.48269°W

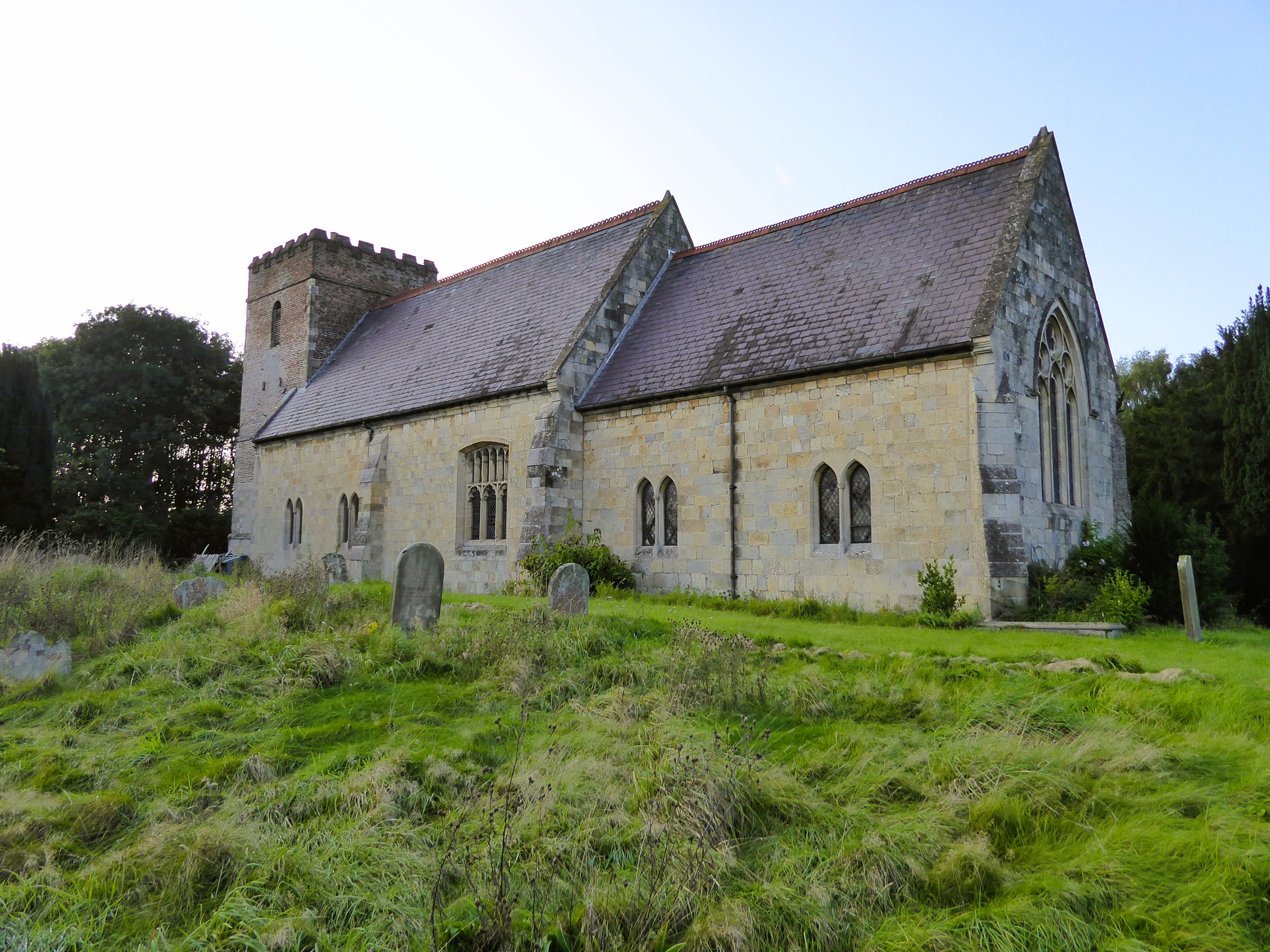
The church, in 2023

All Saints' Church is the parish church of Kilnwick, a village in the East Riding of Yorkshire, in England.

The church was built in or before the 12th century, with parts of the nave surviving from this period. The north aisle was added in the early 13th century, and the chancel later that century. The tower was added in the 15th century, and rebuilt in the 17th century. Most of the church was rebuilt in 1871. The building was grade II* listed in 1968.

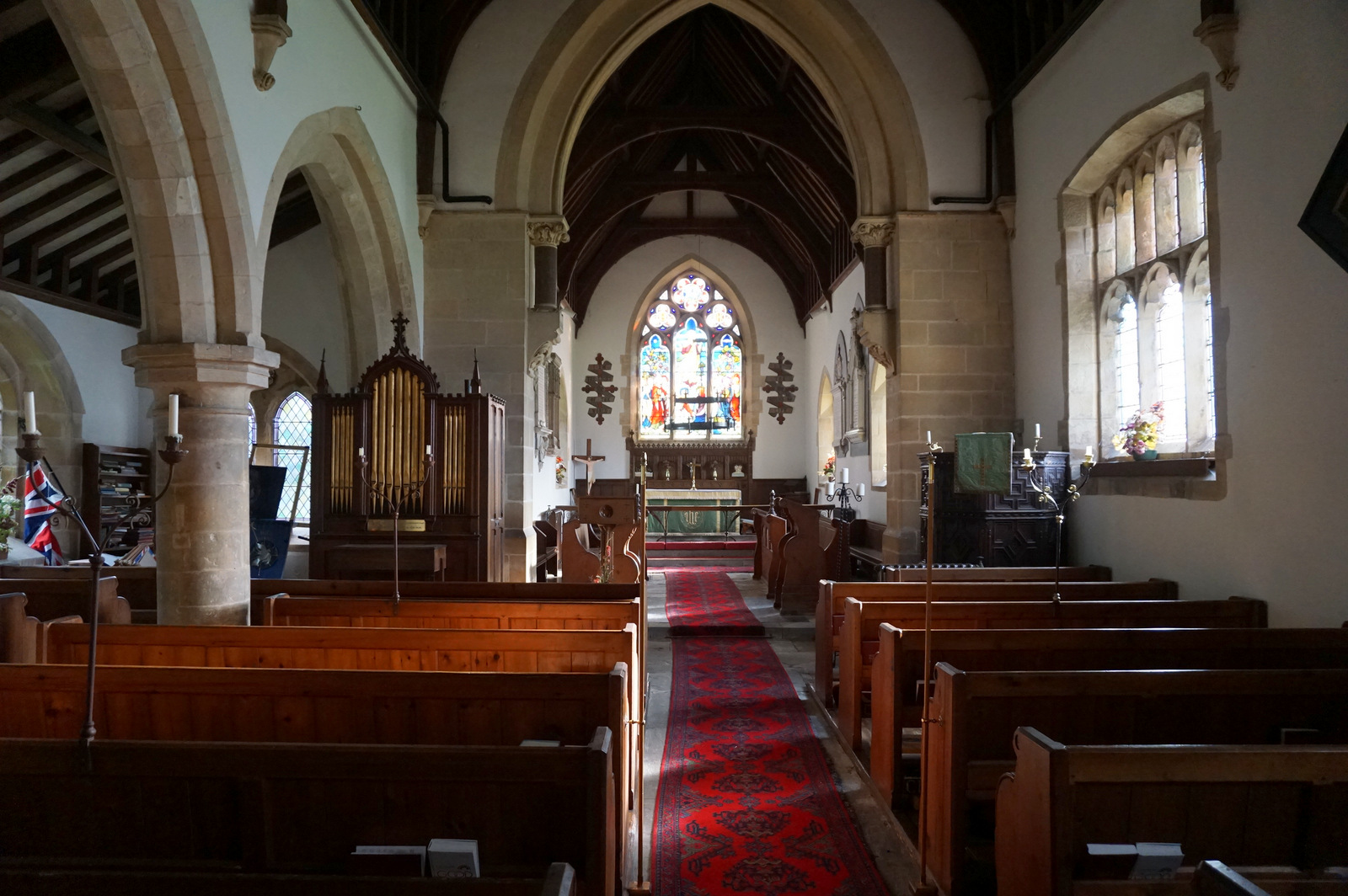
View from the nave into the chancel

The church is built of stone with slate roofs, and consists of a nave, a north aisle, a north porch, a chancel and a west tower. The tower has two stages, a chamfered plinth, a northeast stair turret, and round-headed bell openings, above which is a band and an embattled parapet. The reset north doorway is Norman, and has two orders. The shafts have scalloped capitals, and the arches have beakhead decoration and a single beast at the head of the arch. Inside, there is a mid-17th century pulpit, an organ built in 1836 with a neo-Gothic case, and a font with an early-13th century top, on a newer basin and octagonal pillar. There are various memorial tablets from the 18th century.

== See also ==
- Grade II* listed buildings in the East Riding of Yorkshire
- Listed buildings in Beswick, East Riding of Yorkshire
