= Beswick, East Riding of Yorkshire =

Village and civil parish in the East Riding of Yorkshire, England

Coordinates: 53.919520°N 0.460195°W

Beswick
- Location within the East Riding of Yorkshire
- Population: 357 (2011 census)
- OS grid reference: TA012481
  - London: 170 mi (270 km) S
- Civil parish: Beswick
- Unitary authority: East Riding of Yorkshire
- Ceremonial county: East Riding of Yorkshire
- Region: Yorkshire and the Humber
- Country: England
- Sovereign state: United Kingdom
- Post town: DRIFFIELD
- Postcode district: YO25
- Dialling code: 01377
- Police: Humberside
- Fire: Humberside
- Ambulance: Yorkshire
- UK Parliament: Beverley and Holderness

Beswick (/ˈbɛzɪk/) is a village and civil parish in the East Riding of Yorkshire, England. The village is situated on the A164 road, about 6 miles (10 km) north of Beverley and 6 miles south of Driffield.

The civil parish is formed by the villages of Beswick and Kilnwick and the hamlet of Wilfholme. According to the 2011 UK census, Beswick parish had a population of 357, a slight decline on the 2001 UK census figure of 372.

The name Beswick derives from the Old Norse Bosiwīc or Becciwīc meaning 'Bosi's' or 'Becci's trading settlement'.

Beswick was the former home of P.H. Sissons & Sons, famous for wheelwrighting and building 'Wolds Wagons' since 1854. One of the wagons is at Skidby Windmill.

Beswick Hall was designated a Grade II* listed building in 1968 and is now recorded in the National Heritage List for England, maintained by Historic England.

== See also ==
- Listed buildings in Beswick, East Riding of Yorkshire
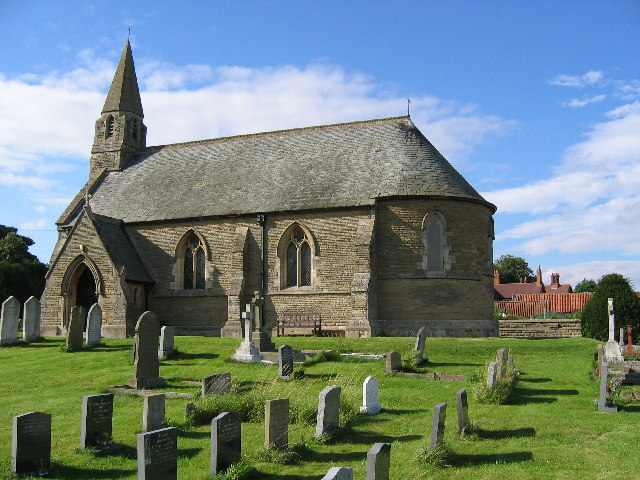
St Margaret's Church, Beswick

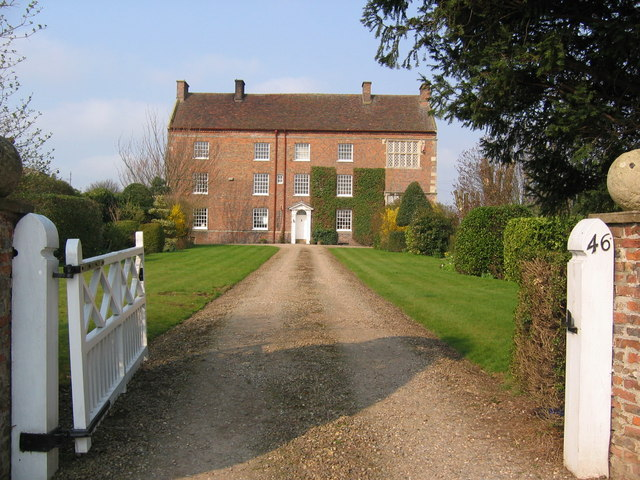
Beswick Hall
