= Francis Thomas Ford =

English engineer and inventor

Francis Thomas Ford (1877–1946) was an English engineer and inventor who established a successful welding and engineering firm in Cardiff, Wales.

== Early life ==
Frances Thomas Ford was born in Stapleton, Bristol on 4 March 1877. In the 1901 UK census he was living in Norwich and working as a cycle mechanic. Later he moved to Cardiff and he established a welding and engineering enterprise, the Ford Welding and Engineering Company locally. It was through these later endeavours that he received a certain amount of recognition and local acclaim.

== Working life ==
Once in Cardiff he set up the Ford Welding & Engineering Co. Ltd, located in the Tunnel Works where the Glamorganshire canal emerged from the tunnel under Queen Street. The works later moved to Forwell Works at 149 North Road Cardiff next to the weighbridge on Parkfield Place about 1950.

Over a period of 20 years Francis patented a number of inventions under The Forwell trade mark. He also worked as an Instructor in Oxy-Acetylene Welding at Cardiff Technical College and was also a keen Photographer.

=== Patents ===
A number of patents are associated with Francis Ford, including:

1. "Peak o Power" piston rings Jan 1931 GB341798 and Jan 1932 GB318783.
2. The Secura Gudgeon pin retainers Jun 1934 GB412227
3. "Forwell Jig" for remetalling white metal Conrods and liners Dec 1938 GB496702 and GB496805
4. Improvements relating to lathes Dec 1940 GB531162
5. Improvements to bins and racks for storage Aug 1943 GB555616

== Photography ==
He took photographs of all the machines and equipment he purchased for the Ford Welding and Engineering Company and kept records of purchase prices. He was a keen member of the Cardiff Photographic Club and took part in many competitions. One of his favourite photos which he entered into a competition was called 'The Elusive Tiddler' and showed a group of children trying to catch a fish on the bank of the Glamorganshire Canal in 1936.
