= Frank Ford (priest) =

Frank Edward Ford (9 July 1902 – 26 November 1976) was the archdeacon of the East Riding from 1957 to 1970.

Ford was educated at Lancing College and Hertford College, Oxford. He was ordained after a period of study at Westcott House, Cambridge and ordained in 1928. After a curacy at St Chrysotom Victoria Park, Manchester he worked for Toc H in various capacities from 1929 to 1940. He held incumbencies at St John Newland and St Thomas, Scarborough before his Archdeacon’s appointment; and Bainton afterwards.

Church of England titles
Preceded by Henry Townsend Vodden	Archdeacon of the East Riding; 1957–1970	Succeeded by Donald George Snelgrove
