= Grade I listed buildings in East Lindsey =

There are over 9,000 Grade I listed buildings in England. This page is a list of these buildings in the district of East Lindsey in Lincolnshire.

== East Lindsey ==
Name	Location	Type	Completed (Note: The date given is the date used by Historic England as significant for the initial building or that of an important part in the structure's description.)	Date designated	Grid ref. (Note: The grid reference is based on the British national grid reference system, sometimes known as OSGB36, used by the Ordnance Survey.) Geo-coordinates	Entry number (Note: The "List Entry Number" is a unique number assigned to each listed building and scheduled monument by Historic England.)	Image
Church of St Nicholas	Addlethorpe	Parish Church	15th century	3 February 1967	TF5508969095; 53°11′47″N 0°19′13″E	1359681	Church of St Nicholas More images
Church of St Wilfrid	Alford	Grammar School	1566	20 May 1953	TF4555476069; 53°15′42″N 0°10′51″E	1063026	Church of St Wilfrid More images
Alford Windmill	Alford	Windmill	1837	20 May 1953	TF4576376504; 53°15′56″N 0°11′03″E	1146936	Alford Windmill More images
Church of St Adelwold	Alvingham	Parish Church	c. 1300	9 March 1967	TF3679491315; 53°24′03″N 0°03′22″E	1063076	Church of St Adelwold More images
Church of St Mary	Alvingham	Parish Church	1967	9 March 1967	TF3676291333; 53°24′04″N 0°03′20″E	1261895	Church of St Mary More images
Church of St. Swithin	Baumber	Church	11th century	14 September 1966	TF2219374456; 53°15′11″N 0°10′12″W	1063173	Church of St. Swithin More images
Bolingbroke Castle	Bolingbroke	Castle	1220-1230	28 October 1987	TF3491165039; 53°09′55″N 0°01′00″E	1309023	Bolingbroke Castle More images
Little Grimsby Hall	Brackenborough with Little Grimsby	Country House	c. 1700	9 September 1967	TF3266891364; 53°24′09″N 0°00′21″W	1063121	Little Grimsby Hall More images
Church of St Peter and St Paul	Burgh Le Marsh	Church	1702	3 February 1967	TF5008365010; 53°09′40″N 0°14′36″E	1222765	Church of St Peter and St Paul More images
Dobson's Windmill	Burgh Le Marsh	Feed Mill	1813	28 May 1965	TF5037664972; 53°09′38″N 0°14′52″E	1222732	Dobson's Windmill More images
Church of St Michael	Burwell	Parish Church	Early 12th century	9 March 1967	TF3557479698; 53°17′49″N 0°01′58″E	1063684	Church of St Michael More images
Gunby Hall	Gunby Park, Candlesby with Gunby	Country House	1700	3 February 1967	TF4671866876; 53°10′44″N 0°11′38″E	1063656	Gunby Hall More images
Church Close	Coningsby	Aisled House	14th century	20 May 1969	TF2221758000; 53°06′19″N 0°10′33″W	1215282	Upload Photo
Church of St Michael	Coningsby	Parish Church	13th century	14 September 1966	TF2223558039; 53°06′20″N 0°10′32″W	1215652	Church of St Michael More images
Church of St Peter	Conisholme	Parish Church	Late 12th century	9 March 1967	TF4026595375; 53°26′11″N 0°06′36″E	1165526	Church of St Peter More images
Church of All Saints	Croft	Parish Church	14th century	3 February 1967	TF5092561847; 53°07′57″N 0°15′16″E	1223215	Church of All Saints More images
Church of All Saints	Friskney	Parish Church	Late 12th century	3 February 1967	TF4606255402; 53°04′33″N 0°10′44″E	1223280	Church of All Saints More images
Cross, Church Lane	Friskney	Cross	Mid 15th century	17 December 1987	TF4810255223; 53°04′25″N 0°12′33″E	1223281	Cross, Church Lane
Church of St Clement	Grainthorpe	Parish Church	c. 1200	9 September 1967	TF3877296582; 53°26′52″N 0°05′17″E	1308429	Church of St Clement More images
Somersby Grange	Greetham with Somersby	House	1722	25 October 1951	TF3432672595; 53°14′00″N 0°00′40″E	1147797	Somersby Grange More images
Church of St Edith	Grimoldby	Parish Church	13th century	9 March 1967	TF3928187954; 53°22′12″N 0°05′31″E	1359986	Church of St Edith More images
Church of St Mary	Hainton	Parish Church	11th century	9 March 1967	TF1802384485; 53°20′39″N 0°13′43″W	1147298	Church of St Mary More images
Hainton Hall	Hainton	Country House	1638	6 June 1952	TF1796284346; 53°20′34″N 0°13′47″W	1063102	Hainton Hall More images
Church of St Benedict	Haltham	Parish Church	Early 12th century	14 September 1966	TF2461463842; 53°09′26″N 0°08′16″W	1215674	Church of St Benedict More images
Church of St Andrew	Hannah, Hannah cum Hagnaby	Parish Church	1758	3 February 1967	TF4998179439; 53°17′26″N 0°14′55″E	1147204	Church of St Andrew More images
Harrington Hall	Harrington	Country House	Late 16th century	3 February 1967	TF3674471803; 53°13′32″N 0°02′49″E	1308532	Harrington Hall More images
Church of St Leonard	Haugh	Parish Church	11th century	9 March 1967	TF4156275929; 53°15′41″N 0°07′15″E	1168562	Church of St Leonard More images
Church of St Mary	Hogsthorpe	Parish Church	12th century	3 February 1967	TF5341672216; 53°13′29″N 0°17′48″E	1063615	Church of St Mary More images
Roman Wall	Horncastle	Wall	late C3-mid C4	25 March 1987	TF2592469682; 53°12′33″N 0°06′57″W	1251946	Roman Wall
Roman Wall	Horncastle	Wall	late C3-mid C4	7 December 1966	TF2582069502; 53°12′28″N 0°07′03″W	1262704	Upload Photo
Roman Wall Embedded in Clinic Building	Horncastle	Wall	late C3-mid C4	7 December 1966	TF2578569540; 53°12′29″N 0°07′05″W	1251668	Upload Photo
Roman Wall Now in Lobby of Public Library	Horncastle	Wall	late C3-mid C4	7 December 1966	TF2595469558; 53°12′29″N 0°06′56″W	1262504	Upload Photo
Roman Wall to Rear of the Manor House	Horncastle	Wall	late C3-mid C4	7 December 1966	TF2576769586; 53°12′30″N 0°07′06″W	1262720	Roman Wall to Rear of the Manor House
Section of Roman Wall to Rear of No 5	Horncastle	Settlement	Roman	7 December 1966	TF2580169606; 53°12′31″N 0°07′04″W	1063769	Upload Photo
Church of St Margaret	Huttoft	Parish Church	13th century	3 February 1967	TF5115276421; 53°15′48″N 0°15′53″E	1360009	Church of St Margaret More images
Church of St Peter and St Paul	Ingoldmells	Parish Church	c. 1200	3 February 1967	TF5594768832; 53°11′37″N 0°19′58″E	1204941	Church of St Peter and St Paul More images
Louth Abbey Ruins	Keddington	Abbey	Late 12th century	9 March 1967	TF3548788565; 53°22′36″N 0°02′07″E	1063050	Louth Abbey Ruins More images
Church of St Peter and St Paul	Langton, Langton by Spilsby	Parish Church	Early 18th century	3 February 1967	TF3898770396; 53°12′45″N 0°04′48″E	1063677	Church of St Peter and St Paul More images
Church of All Saints	Legbourne	Parish Church	14th century	9 March 1967	TF3676284430; 53°20′21″N 0°03′09″E	1063692	Church of All Saints More images
Parish Church of St James	Louth	Parish Church	Early 15th century	2 November 1954	TF3263687381; 53°22′00″N 0°00′29″W	1063264	Parish Church of St James More images
Church of St Mary	Ludborough	Parish Church	13th century	9 September 1967	TF2959295503; 53°26′25″N 0°03′02″W	1063122	Church of St Mary More images
Church of St Peter	Lusby with Winceby	Parish Church	11th century	14 September 1966	TF3402867935; 53°11′30″N 0°00′17″E	1166335	Church of St Peter More images
Church of St Mary	Marshchapel	Parish Church	Early 15th century	9 September 1967	TF3598598812; 53°28′07″N 0°02′50″E	1063124	Church of St Mary More images
Church of St Thomas of Canterbury	Mumby	Parish Church	13th century	3 February 1967	TF5156374433; 53°14′43″N 0°16′12″E	1204944	Church of St Thomas of Canterbury More images
Church of St Mary	North Somercotes	Parish Church	Late 12th century	9 March 1967	TF4223195764; 53°26′22″N 0°08′23″E	1063052	Church of St Mary More images
Methodist Chapel and Stables at Raithby Hall	Raithby	Methodist Chapel	c. 1760	3 February 1967	TF3738567034; 53°10′58″N 0°03′16″E	1063583	Methodist Chapel and Stables at Raithby Hall More images
Revesby Abbey and stable yard	Revesby	House	Before 1845	14 September 1966	TF3072362462; 53°08′36″N 0°02′49″W	1288157	Revesby Abbey and stable yard More images
Church of All Saints	Saltfleetby	Parish Church	12th century	9 March 1967	TF4551890416; 53°23′26″N 0°11′12″E	1063055	Church of All Saints More images
West Tower of former Church of St Peter	Saltfleetby	Tower	Late 15th century	9 March 1967	TF4357189941; 53°23′12″N 0°09′26″E	1165820	West Tower of former Church of St Peter More images
Scrivelsby Court	Scrivelsby	House	Early 19th century	17 April 1961	TF2699666036; 53°10′35″N 0°06′05″W	1252217	Scrivelsby Court More images
Church of St Margaret	Sibsey	Parish Church	12th century	3 February 1967	TF3544650744; 53°02′13″N 0°01′07″E	1063533	Church of St Margaret More images
Sibsey Trader Mill	Sibsey	Windmill	1877	3 November 1955	TF3446650962; 53°02′21″N 0°00′15″E	1063535	Sibsey Trader Mill More images
Church of St Mary	Winthorpe, Skegness	Church	Late 12th century	20 April 1976	TF5591165851; 53°10′01″N 0°19′51″E	1229941	Church of St Mary More images
Church of St Botolph	Skidbrooke, Skidbrooke with Saltfleet Haven	Parish Church	Early 13th century	9 March 1967	TF4399693224; 53°24′58″N 0°09′55″E	1165864	Church of St Botolph More images
Church of St Leonard	South Cockerington	Parish Church	Early 14th century	9 March 1967	TF3815388727; 53°22′38″N 0°04′31″E	1309123	Church of St Leonard More images
Church of St Leonard	South Ormsby, South Ormsby cum Ketsby	Parish Church	12th century	3 February 1967	TF3693875151; 53°15′21″N 0°03′04″E	1168707	Church of St Leonard More images
Church of St Peter	South Somercotes	Parish Church	c. 1200	9 March 1967	TF4159093800; 53°25′19″N 0°07′45″E	1063023	Church of St Peter More images
Church of St James	Spilsby	Parish Church	Late 14th century	3 February 1967	TF4002666090; 53°10′25″N 0°05′37″E	1308892	Church of St James More images
Halstead Hall	Halstead, Stixwould and Woodhall	Country House	16th century	14 September 1966	TF1882966273; 53°10′49″N 0°13′24″W	1146993	Upload Photo
Church of Holy Trinity	Tattershall	Church	15th century	14 September 1966	TF2121057584; 53°06′06″N 0°11′28″W	1215320	Church of Holy Trinity More images
Kitchen Ruins to Tattershall Castle	Tattershall	Kitchen	c. 1440	14 September 1966	TF2106557522; 53°06′04″N 0°11′36″W	1288162	Upload Photo
Market Cross	Tattershall	Market Cross	15th century	14 September 1966	TF2123457886; 53°06′16″N 0°11′26″W	1287778	Market Cross More images
Moat Walls at Tattershall Castle	Tattershall	Castle	c. 1440	14 September 1966	TF2110457512; 53°06′04″N 0°11′34″W	1215318	Moat Walls at Tattershall Castle More images
Round Towers, Tattershall Castle	Tattershall	Castle	c. 1230	14 September 1966	TF2106257558; 53°06′05″N 0°11′36″W	1216195	Upload Photo
Stable Ruins at Tattershall Castle	Tattershall	Castle	c. 1440	14 September 1966	TF2101957562; 53°06′06″N 0°11′38″W	1215319	Stable Ruins at Tattershall Castle More images
Tattershall Castle	Tattershall	Castle	c. 1440	14 September 1966	TF2105657544; 53°06′05″N 0°11′36″W	1215317	Tattershall Castle More images
Ticket Office and Shop, Tattershall Castle	Tattershall	Castle	c. 1440	14 September 1966	TF2114057592; 53°06′06″N 0°11′31″W	1287738	Ticket Office and Shop, Tattershall Castle More images
Church of St Peter and St Paul	Tetney	Parish Church	1363	9 September 1967	TA3166700892; 53°29′18″N 0°01′01″W	1359942	Church of St Peter and St Paul More images
Church of All Saints	Theddlethorpe All Saints	Altar	Medieval	9 March 1967	TF4636688208; 53°22′14″N 0°11′55″E	1062991	Church of All Saints More images
Church of St Peter	Thorpe St. Peter	Parish Church	c. 1200	3 February 1967	TF4849760684; 53°07′22″N 0°13′04″E	1223796	Church of St Peter More images
Tupholme Abbey	Tupholme	Wall	12th century	14 September 1966	TF1441868200; 53°11′55″N 0°17′19″W	1063169	Tupholme Abbey More images
Magdalen College School	Wainfleet All Saints	School	1484	3 February 1967	TF4989358765; 53°06′18″N 0°14′15″E	1224243	Magdalen College School More images
Church of St Martin	Waithe	Parish Church	10th century	9 September 1967	TA2837500705; 53°29′15″N 0°04′00″W	1359965	Church of St Martin More images
Church of St Margaret	Well Vale Park, Well	Parish Church	1733	3 February 1967	TF4440573375; 53°14′16″N 0°09′44″E	1359700	Church of St Margaret More images
Church of All Saints	West Ashby	Parish Church	Early 12th century	14 September 1966	TF2658372461; 53°14′03″N 0°06′18″W	1252247	Church of All Saints More images
Church of St Helen	Willoughby, Willoughby with Sloothby	Parish Church	14th century	3 February 1967	TF4734471962; 53°13′27″N 0°12′20″E	1063629	Church of St Helen More images
Church of St Leonard	Woodhall Spa	Abbey	c1230-40	14 September 1966	TF1901161371; 53°08′10″N 0°13′21″W	1288191	Church of St Leonard More images
Kirkstead Abbey ruins	Woodhall Spa	Abbey	c. 1200	14 September 1966	TF1892961645; 53°08′19″N 0°13′25″W	1288192	Kirkstead Abbey ruins More images
Church of St John the Baptist	Yarburgh	Parish Church	14th century	9 September 1967	TF3509393072; 53°25′02″N 0°01′52″E	1063089	Church of St John the Baptist More images
