= Ashby Puerorum =

Village in Lincolnshire, England

Coordinates: 53.223°N 0.013°W

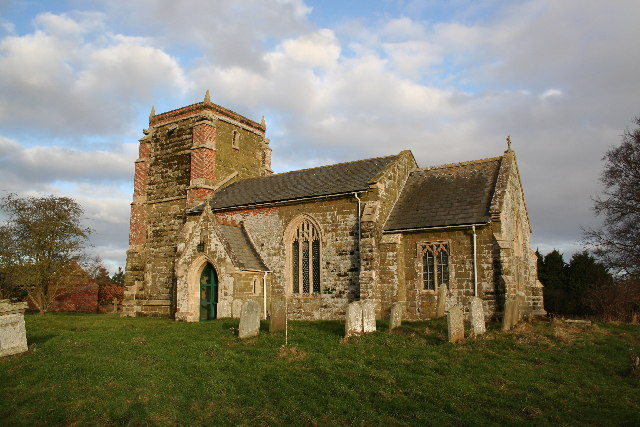
- St Andrew's Church, Ashby Puerorum

- Location within Lincolnshire
- OS grid reference: TF327714
  - London: 115 mi (185 km) S
- Civil parish: Greetham with Somersby
- District: East Lindsey
- Shire county: Lincolnshire
- Region: East Midlands
- Country: England
- Sovereign state: United Kingdom
- Post town: Horncastle
- Postcode district: LN9
- Police: Lincolnshire
- Fire: Lincolnshire
- Ambulance: East Midlands
- UK Parliament: Louth and Horncastle

Ashby Puerorum is a small village and former civil parish, now in the parish of Greetham with Somersby, in the East Lindsey district of Lincolnshire, England. The village situated 6 miles (10 km) north-west from Partney, 4 miles (6 km) east from Horncastle, to the north of the A158 road, and to the west of Bag Enderby. In 1931 the parish had a population of 97. On 1 April 1936 the parish was abolished and merged with Somersby.

Bishop Oliver Sutton (1280–1299) was responsible for the renaming of this village, coining the name Ashby Puerorum or "the Little Boys' Ashby". This came about after the bishop assigned the revenues of the vicarage of Ashby to the upkeep of the boys in the cathedral choir.

Ashby Puerorum Grade II* listed Anglican church is dedicated to St Andrew. The church is chiefly Early English with Perpendicular windows and tower. There are brass effigies to Richard Lytleburye (d. 1521) and his wife Elizabeth (d. 1523).
