= Greetham =

Greetham may refer to:

== Places ==
- Greetham, Lincolnshire
- Greetham, Rutland
- Greetham with Somersby, a civil parish in Lincolnshire, England

== People ==
- Chris Greetham (1936–2017), English cricketer
- David Greetham (cricketer) (born 1975), English cricketer
- David Greetham (textual scholar) (1941–2020), American literary critic

== Other ==
- HMS Greetham, Ham class minesweeper, sold to Libya in 1962

== See also ==
- Greatham (disambiguation)
