= Raithby by Spilsby =

Village and civil parish in the East Lindsey district of Lincolnshire, England

Coordinates: 53.184116°N 0.052608°E

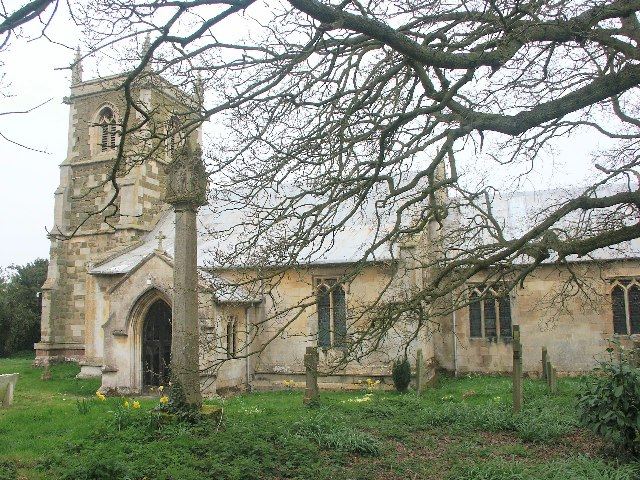
- Holy Trinity Church, Raithby

- Location within Lincolnshire
- Population: 190 (including Mavis Enderby, 2011)
- OS grid reference: TF372671
  - London: 115 mi (185 km) S
- Civil parish: Raithby
- District: East Lindsey
- Shire county: Lincolnshire
- Region: East Midlands
- Country: England
- Sovereign state: United Kingdom
- Post town: Spilsby
- Postcode district: PE23
- Police: Lincolnshire
- Fire: Lincolnshire
- Ambulance: East Midlands
- UK Parliament: Louth and Horncastle

Raithby by Spilsby or Raithby is a village and civil parish in the East Lindsey district of Lincolnshire, England. It is situated about 2 miles (3.2 km) north-west from the town of Spilsby.

Raithby has associations with the founder of Methodism, John Wesley, and the Victorian architect, George Gilbert Scott.

== History ==
Raithby is listed in the 1086 Domesday Book as "Radebi", with 26 households, a mill and a church.

The parish church is a Grade II* listed building dating from the 12th century, although it was largely rebuilt in 1873 by Sir George Gilbert Scott. The chancel was enlarged in 1886 by Temple Moore, and the tower renewed by Hodgson Fowler in 1895. The lychgate is Grade II listed and dates from 1907. It was dedicated to the memory of Sophy Janet Rawnsley, of Raithby Hall. In the grounds of the churchyard is a stone cross, mostly dating from 1903 but using part of an earlier shaft. The old base is not used and lies 6 feet (1.8 m) away.

The red-brick Raithby Hall was the seat of the Brackenbury and Rawnsley families, built around 1760 for Robert Carr Brackenbury and extended in 1848 and 1873 by Sir George Gilbert Scott. It is now an old peoples home, and is Grade II listed.

This village played an important role in the spread of Methodism in Lincolnshire. After visiting Raithby in 1788, John Wesley, the founder of Methodism, declared it 'an earthly paradise'. Raithby contains one of the oldest Methodist chapels in England, and one of the few surviving chapels opened by Wesley himself. Raithby Chapel was built over a stable block in the grounds of Raithby Hall in 1779 by Robert Carr Brackenbury, and was dedicated by Wesley on 5 July 1779. It is a Grade I listed building.

The children of Raithby were served by a village school from 1668 when Thomas Lawford founded a Free School where children from Raithby, Mavis Enderby, Hundleby and Sausthorpe were educated. The school was rebuilt in 1866 to hold 45 pupils. By the 1870s it was known as Raithby and Mavis Enderby School, and Raithby and Enderby CE School by 1925. It closed on 21 December 1949.

== Community ==
Raithby is situated 29 miles (47 km) from Lincoln, and around 12 miles (19 km) from the market town of Horncastle, the "gateway to the Wolds". It is also 14 miles (23 km) north-west from the coastal resort of Skegness. Nearby attractions include the birthplaces of Alfred, Lord Tennyson at Somersby, and explorer Sir John Franklin at Spilsby.

The mid-18th-century Grade II listed The Red Lion Inn is the village public house.

Raithby is served by the Interconnet 56 bus service, which runs from Lincoln Central bus station to Skegness Interchange. The bus stops outside the Red Lion Inn pub.

== Notable people ==
- John Morley (1838–1864), first-class cricketer
