= Charles Whistler =

The Reverend Charles Watts Whistler MRCS, LSA, (14 November 1856 – 10 June 1913) was an English physician, clergyman, historian, and writer of historical fiction, who set his story-telling work between 600 and 1100 CE, usually based on early Saxon chronicles, Norse or Danish sagas, and archaeological discoveries.

== Life ==
Charles Watts Whistler was the oldest son of the Rev. Rose Fuller Whistler, Vicar of Ashburnham in Sussex, a Vice President of the Sussex Archaeological Society, and later Rector of Elton, Huntingdonshire, to which cure Charles Watts Whistler would succeed. The family descended from the Sussex branch of the Thames Valley family of Whistler, as did Rex Whistler and his brother the glass engraver Sir Laurence Whistler.

Whistler was educated at Merchant Taylors School, London and Emmanuel College, Cambridge, before studying medicine at St Thomas's Hospital, Lambeth, and becoming a member of the Royal College of Surgeons and a licentiate of the Society of Apothecaries. After practising as a surgeon (like his maternal grandfather James Watts MRCS, of Battle, Sussex), he was ordained deacon in 1884 and priest in 1885. He then served successively as curate of Woolton, Liverpool (1884–1885), Chaplain of the Fishermen's Chapel, Hastings (1885–1888), Vicar of All Saints' Church, Theddlethorpe, Lincolnshire (1888–1894), Rector of Elton, Huntingdonshire (1894–1895), Vicar of Stockland Bristol, Somerset (1895–1909), and finally Rector of Cheselbourne, Dorset (1909–1913).

Whistler was married on 3 March 1886 to Georgiana Rosalie Shapter Strange, daughter of William James Stevenson Strange, a master wool-dyer by then retired. His brother Alfred James Whistler married Georgiana's sister Mary Maud Strange. The two women's brother, W. R. P. Strange, had been Vicar of Stockland before Whistler.

Whistler's interest in the history of England before the Norman Conquest appears in his prolific work as a historical novelist. His works were popular in their day, but the archaism of language he adopted makes them less accessible to modern readers.

== History ==
- Early Wars of Wessex (Cambridge University Press, 1913), with Albany F. Major

== Fiction ==
- A Thane of Wessex (1896)
- Wulfric the Weapon Thane (1897)
- King Olaf’s Kinsman (1898), a story of the Last Saxon Struggle against the Danes in the Days of Ironside and Cnut (set c. 1000 CE)
- King Alfred's Viking (1899), a story of the First English Fleet
- Havelok the Dane (1900), a legend of Old Grimsby and Lincoln (set c. 580 CE)
- For King or Empress? (1903)
- A Prince of Cornwall (1904), a story of Glastonbury and the West in the Days of Ina of Wessex (set 690-710 CE)
- A King’s Comrade (1905), a story of Old Hereford (set c. 790 CE)
- Gerald the Sheriff (1906)
- A Sea Queen Sailing (1906, set c. 935 CE)
- A Prince Errant (1908)
- Dragon Osmund (1914)
- A Son of Odin (1914)

== Summaries ==
- Havelok plays around 580–600 CE in Denmark and England, one or two generations after mythical King Arthur (and his people's struggle with the Saxons) and shows early relations between the Danes and Saxons (now well-established in England with their own kingdoms) and the already Christianized Welsh in England. It also introduces dislike between the Danes/Jutes (cousins of the Saxons) and the Norse. It is based one of the most popular pre-Elizabethan sagas of the British Isles, which shares traits with the classic Nordic sagas.
- Prince of Cornwall takes place about a hundred years or four generations later – c. 690–710 CE – and deals much with the relations between Welsh and Saxons, and some resident Danes in the country.
- King's Comrade is again three generations later, c. 790 CE. It is mainly focused on inter-Saxon conflict (King Ethelbert, King Offa), and problems with the Welsh, who still would like to get their lost estates back. Introduces Norse campaigns on the Frankish coast, founding the Norse state of Normandy.
- Wulfric the Weapon Thane shows how the Danes invade the English realm and found kingdoms, turning from fun-loving plunderers to competitive conquerors.
- Thane of Wessex takes place shortly before King Alfred's rule. The hero is robbed of land and title through bitter intrigues, and banned from the realm. But as he tries to leave the kingdom, he is followed by pursuers who are after his life. Soon Whistler has one or two tasty conflicts of interest, and we have a man in a mess – how to do the right thing if you have no rights or honour in the eyes of your former peers?
- King Alfred's Viking tells more of the battles between the English (united at last) and the Danes. It tells of the first navy of England, built by Alfred with help from Norse friends.
- c. 935 CE: A Sea Queen's Sailing (1906)
- c. 1000 CE: King Olaf's Kinsman (1896) – A Story of the Last Saxon Struggle against the Danes in the Days of Ironside and Cnut

== Sources ==
- Alumni Cantabrigenses (Venn) Part II vol 6 p 428 (1954)
