= St Martin's Church, Waithe =

Coordinates: 53.4874°N 0.0666°W

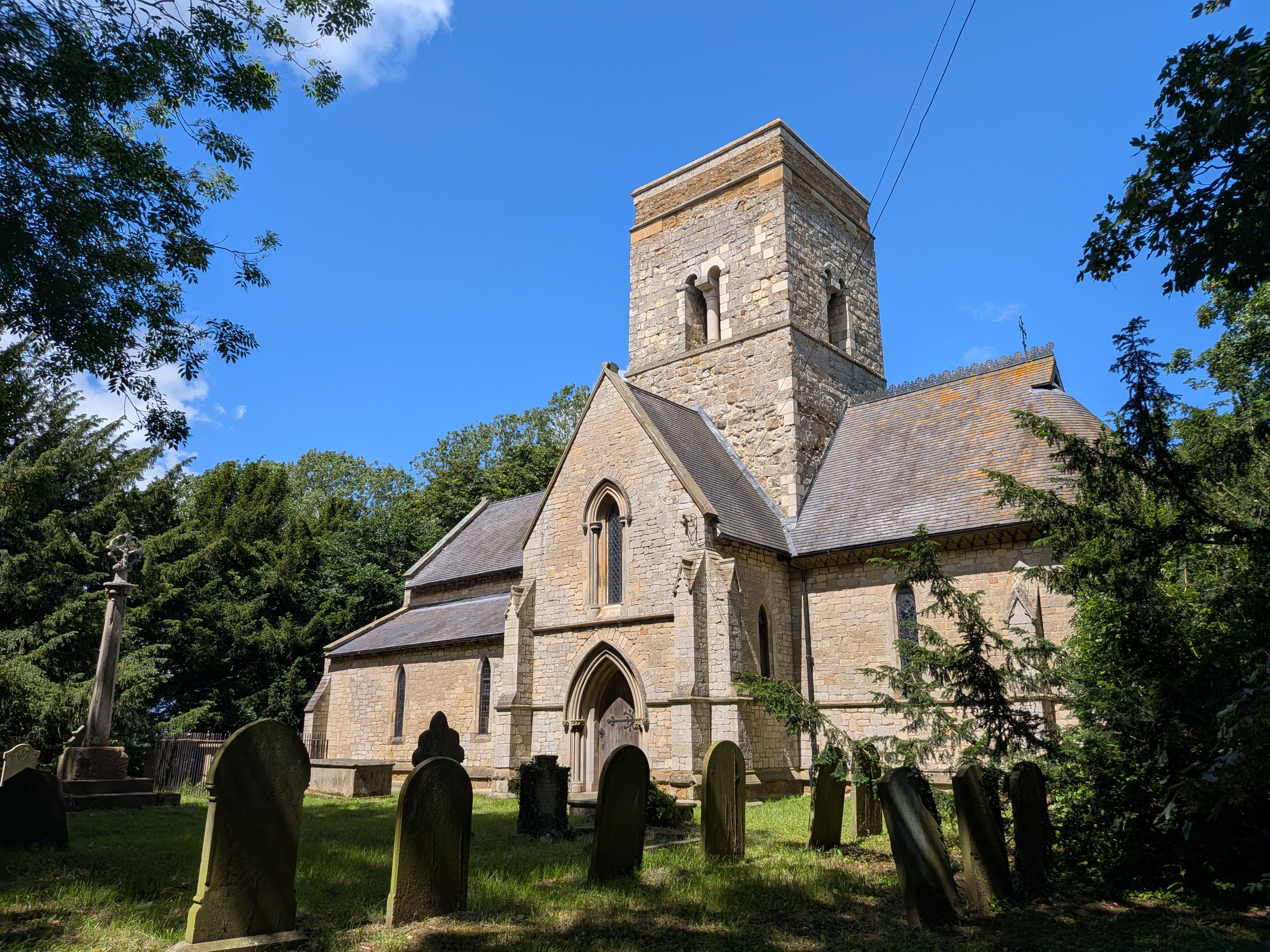
- The building in 2026, after the 2005 restoration

- Location in Lincolnshire
- OS grid reference: TA 283 007
- Location: Waithe, Lincolnshire
- Country: England
- Denomination: Anglican
- Website: Churches Conservation Trust

History
- Dedication: Saint Martin

Architecture
- Functional status: Redundant
- Heritage designation: Grade I
- Designated: 9 September 1967
- Architect: James Fowler (restoration)
- Architectural type: Church
- Style: Saxon, Gothic Revival

Specifications
- Materials: Limestone and ironstone Roofs of tiles and Welsh slate

St Martin's Church is a redundant Anglican church in the village of Waithe, Lincolnshire, England. It is recorded in the National Heritage List for England as a designated Grade I listed building, and is under the care of the Churches Conservation Trust. It stands in open countryside near the A16 road between Grimsby and Louth.

== History ==
The building originates from the 10th century, with additions and alterations carried out in the 11th and 13th centuries. It was restored in 1861 by James Fowler of Louth, for the Haigh family, local landowners. By the time it was vested in the Churches Conservation Trust in the 2000s, the building was in a state of decay and it had been vandalised. Some of the bell openings were near to collapse. The site was overgrown and the interior contained debris and bat guano. Repairs started in October 2005 and cost nearly £350,000.

== Architecture ==
=== Exterior ===
The tower is Anglo-Saxon, and the 19th-century restoration is in Early English style. The church is constructed in local limestone and ironstone, the roofs being a mixture of clay tiles and Welsh slate. Its plan consists of a two-bay nave with north and south aisles, a small south transept, a chancel in the form of an apse, and a central tower at the crossing between the nave and the chancel. The tower is in three stages with a plain parapet. The north wall contains a lancet window over which is a cinquefoil window. The bell openings in the top stage are paired; the lights being separated by a shaft with a cushion capital. The west wall of the church contains four lancet windows and a window in the shape of a vesica. In the north wall of the north aisle are two lancet windows, with a similar window in its east wall. There are five lancets around the apse of the chancel, and another in the east wall of the south transept. In the south wall of the transept is a doorway with a pointed moulded arch flanked by buttresses. In the gable above the doorway is a lancet window, also with a moulded head. In the south wall of the south aisle are two further lancet windows.

=== Interior ===
The nave is separated from the aisles by two-bay arcades. The walls of the aisles and nave consist of bands of red brick and ashlar stone. Around the tops of the walls are tiles containing texts. The tower arches are round-headed. In the south wall of the tower is a marble plaque recording the restoration of the church in 1861. Around the chancel apse is blind arcading consisting of marble shafts and limestone arches with decorated capitals, rising from a string course. The reredos, chancel floor and chancel walls are covered with elaborately decorated Minton tiles. Some of the stained glass is by Ward and Hughes, and the rest is by Powell. The fittings date from the 1861 restoration and include a carved font, a stone pulpit on a marble base, and a full set of pitch pine pews. Beneath the altar is the Haigh family mausoleum.

== External features ==
In the churchyard are the base and shaft of a cross dating from the 14th century and restored in 1861. It is designated as a Grade II listed building and a Scheduled Monument.

== See also ==
- List of churches preserved by the Churches Conservation Trust in the East of England
