= St Peter's Church, South Somercotes =

Coordinates: 53.4221°N 0.1293°E

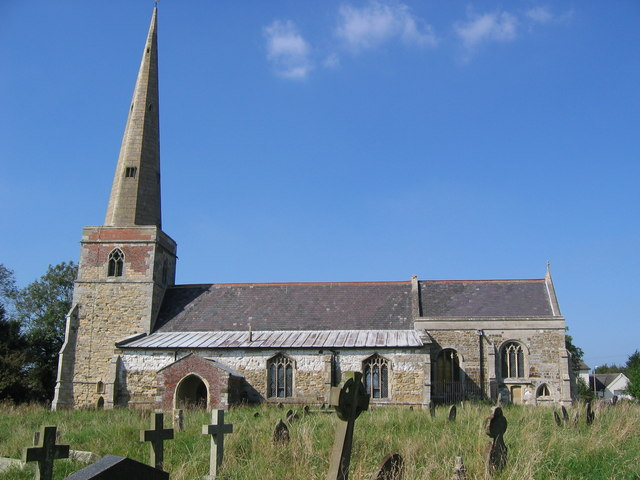
- St Peter's Church, South Somercotes, from the south

- Location in Lincolnshire
- Location: South Somercotes, Lincolnshire
- Country: England
- Denomination: Anglican
- Website: Churches Conservation Trust

History
- Dedication: Saint Peter

Architecture
- Functional status: Redundant
- Heritage designation: Grade I
- Designated: 9 March 1967
- Architectural type: Church
- Style: Gothic

Specifications
- Materials: limestone, greenstone and ironstone, red brick Roofs of slate and lead

St Peter's Church is a redundant Anglican church in the village of South Somercotes, Lincolnshire, England (grid reference TF416938). It is recorded in the National Heritage List for England as a designated Grade I listed building, and is under the care of the Churches Conservation Trust. The church is 8 miles (13 km) to the northeast of Louth, and to the west of the A1013 road. With its tall spire rising from a flat landscape, it has been called "The Queen of the Marsh".

== History ==
The church dates from about 1200, with additions and alterations in each of the following three centuries. It underwent restorations in 1866 and 1896. The church has suffered from subsidence, and since being vested in the Churches Conservation Trust it has been underpinned.

== Architecture ==
=== Exterior ===
St Peter's is constructed in a mixture of limestone, greenstone and ironstone, with some red brick. The roofs are in lead and slate, and are topped by red ridge tiles. Its plan consists of a nave with north and south aisles and a south porch, a chancel and a west tower with a spire. The tower stands on a plinth and has diagonal buttresses and a single string course. On the west side is a 15th-century doorway inserted into the lower part of a 14th-century window. The window has three lights containing Y-tracery. The top stage contains some patching with brick and a two-light bell opening in each side. Above this is a coped parapet. The spire is recessed and octagonal. It contains a doorway on the east side and two tiers of lucarnes, the lower tier having two lights and the upper tier a single light. In the north aisle wall is a two-light window to the west, and a doorway and two three-light windows to the east. In the north wall of the chancel is a three-light round-headed window and a blocked doorway. At the east end of the church are corner buttresses, and the east window has a round head and three lights. The south wall of the chancel has a small blocked 13th-century doorway into which has been inserted a semicircular window. To the west of this are two three-light windows. There are two more three-light windows in the south aisle wall, and a 16th-century gabled porch. The porch is built in red brick with alternating bands of greenstone. The west window has two lights.

=== Interior ===
The tower arch is tall and dates from the 14th century. Both arcades have five bays with round piers and pointed arches. In the spandrels of the arches are carved human heads. The chancel arch dates from the 13th century. The 14th-century screen was restored in the 19th century. In the south wall of the chancel is a small aumbry. The altar rails date from the early 18th century, and the choir stalls from the following century. The 15th-century font has an octagonal bowl carved with Instruments of the Passion. Beneath the bowl are carved human heads. It is supported by a pedestal with molded ribs, and stands on a square plinth. Also in the church is a monument in pink marble dated 1906.

== See also ==
- List of churches preserved by the Churches Conservation Trust in the East of England
