= Theddlethorpe All Saints =

Village in Lincolnshire, England

Coordinates: 53.369577°N 0.20483458°E

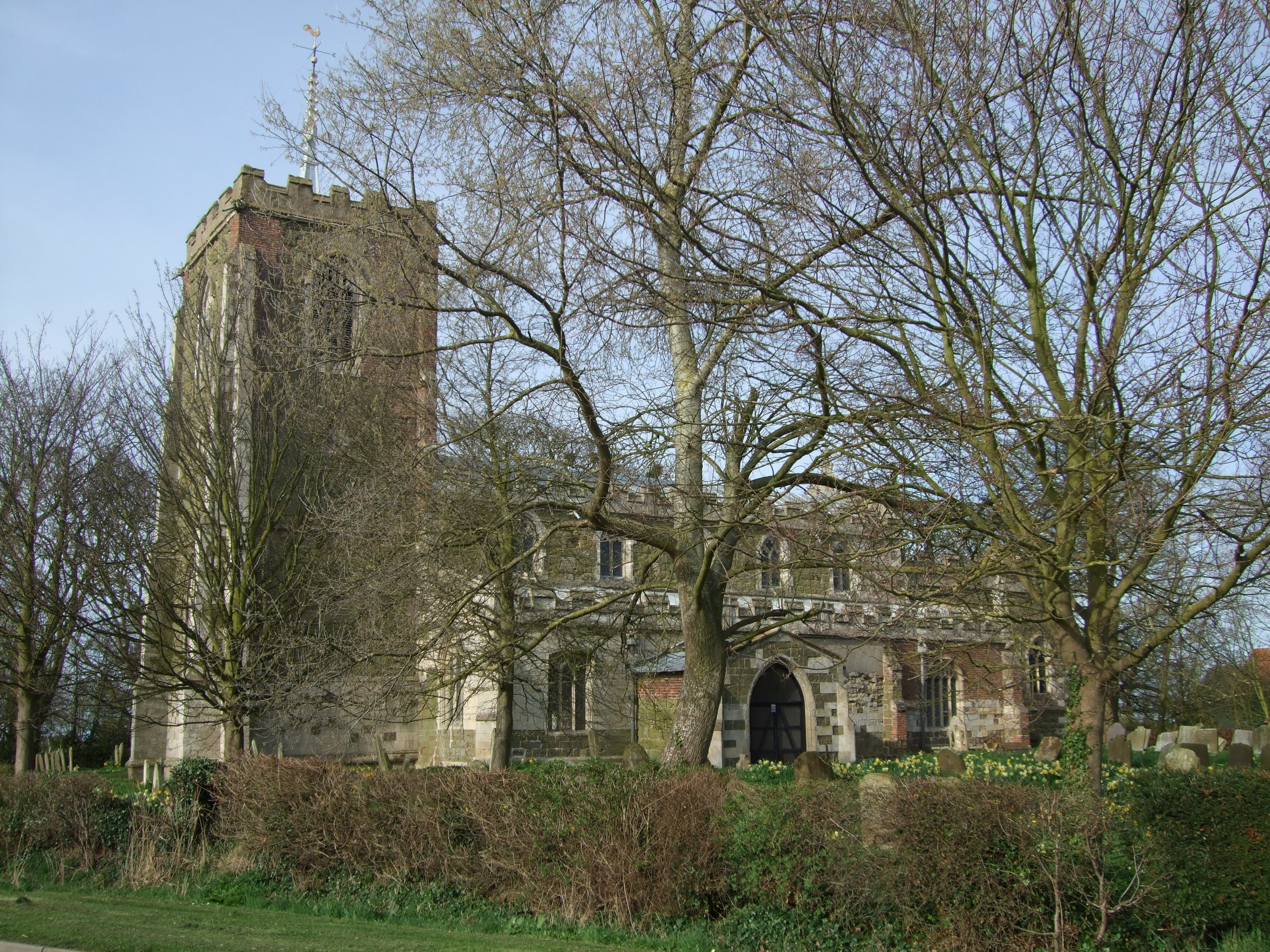
- All Saints’ Church

- Location within Lincolnshire
- Area: 8.25 km^{2} (3.19 sq mi)
- Population: 165 (2011 census)
  - Density: 20/km^{2} (52/sq mi)
- Civil parish: Theddlethorpe All Saints
- District: East Lindsey
- Shire county: Lincolnshire
- Region: East Midlands
- Country: England
- Sovereign state: United Kingdom
- Post town: MABLETHORPE
- Postcode district: LN12
- Police: Lincolnshire
- Fire: Lincolnshire
- Ambulance: East Midlands
- Website: http://parishes.lincolnshire.gov.uk/Theddlethorpe/

Theddlethorpe All Saints or West Theddlethorpe is a village and civil parish about 10 miles (16 km) from Louth, in the East Lindsey district, in the county of Lincolnshire, England. In 2011 the parish had a population of 165. The parish touches Gayton le Marsh, Great Carlton, Saltfleetby and Theddlethorpe St Helen. Theddlethorpe All Saints shares a parish council with Theddlethorpe St Helen.

Population of Theddlethorpe All Saints Civil parish
Year	1801	1811	1821	1831	1841	1851	1881	1891	1901	1911	1921	1931	1951	1961	2001	2011
Population	194	187	211	266	326	356	329	261	242	210	222	189	213	157	212	165

== Landmarks ==
There are 4 listed buildings in Theddlethorpe All Saints. Theddlethorpe All Saints has a redundant church called All Saints’ Church. Hall Farmhouse is a Grade II listed 16th-century red-brick house, altered about 1680 with more alterations in the late 18th and 19th centuries.

Within the parish there is a medieval moat, extant in 1963 but now only visible as cropmarks. A hearth tile bearing the arms of the Angevin family was found when excavation took place in the moated enclosure near Theddlethorpe All Saints’ church. The house within the moat was called Keleshall.

== History ==
The name "Theddlethorpe" means 'Theodlac's outlying farm/settlement'.

== See also ==
- Theddlethorpe
