= Robert Carr Brackenbury =

English Methodist preacher

Robert Carr Brackenbury (1752 – 11 August 1818) was an English Methodist preacher. His biographer, Terence R. Leach, describes him as a ‘poet, practitioner, philanthropist and mystic’.

== Methodism ==
Robert Carr Brackenbury was the son of Carr Brackenbury of Panton, Lincolnshire, where he was baptised on 28 April 1752. He was educated at Felsted School and St Catharine's College, Cambridge.

His chosen career as a Methodist preacher was ‘far removed from what might be expected of a wealthy 18th century Lincolnshire squire’. As a Methodist preacher, Brackenbury was very influential, and proved instrumental in the spread of Methodism in Lincolnshire. Terence Leach suggests a great deal of his influence stemmed from his social standing, for he was ‘the only person in his social sphere who showed any interest in the Methodist cause’. However his skills as an orator were also well recognised throughout the county, and indeed throughout the country, and he was in high demand to speak at the opening ceremonies of Methodist chapels throughout England. He remained an active preacher throughout his life, even taking Methodism to Jersey, where his legacy is still well remembered.

In 1779, Brackenbury constructed a Methodist chapel above the stables in the grounds of his estate in Raithby by Spilsby, Lincolnshire. Raithby Hall was also constructed by Brackenbury around this time. The chapel was completed before the house, which was just a ‘shell’ when John Wesley visited Brackenbury on 5 July 1779 to open the chapel.

John Wesley, the founder of Methodism, was a great friend of Brackenbury, and held him in high regard. Although Brackenbury was never ordained, Wesley appointed him to be part of the ‘Legal Hundred’, a conference of esteemed ministers who advised Wesley and provided guidance on the appointment of preachers. Wesley writes of his visits to Raithby and to Brackenbury's home fondly, after a visit in 1779 he wrote that he ‘could not but observe, while the landlord and his tenants were standing together, how “Love, like Death, maketh all distinctions void.”

In 1791, Brackenbury had just lost his friend and mentor Charles Wesley (John Wesley's brother). He decided to leave Southampton, and take the first coach that drew up. By complete chance Brackenbury ended up in Weymouth, where he was told of the Isle of Portland's darkness and immorality, although in reality conventional crime was rare on the island, and it was probably the unusual marriage and sexual customs that concerned those on the mainland. Within the space of a year Brackenbury and his friend George Smith had a large Methodist following on the island. In 1792 he had a large chapel built in the village of Fortuneswell, including the minister's house, entirely at his own expense. Brackenbury himself continued to stay on Portland for long periods, and in 1792 he rented a thatched cottage at Wakeham for meetings, and there the first Tophill Sunday Schools were held. Upon his death in 1818, his wife continued his work on the island. The 1792 chapel was later replaced with the Underhill Methodist Church, also known as Brackenbury Memorial Church.

== Family ==
Robert Carr Brackenbury was married twice. His first marriage to Jane Coatsworth on 21 July 1780 ended a couple of years later with the death of Jane, who was aged just 24.

Robert remarried in 1795 to Sarah Holland, also a dedicated Methodist. Sarah was very much Robert's junior, and survived him by almost 20 years. Records indicate that Sarah continued her husband's ministry after his death; the 1841 census lists her occupation, as ‘Cure of Souls Without Clerk In Holy Orders’. Despite two marriages, Robert Carr Brackenbury died without any children. Upon the death of his second wife, Sarah, his estate was sold, in an impoverished state, to the Reverend Edward Rawnsley (1816–1905).

== Death ==
Robert died in 1818 and is buried in Raithby Church.

== Legacy ==
Unfortunately few records survive of the life of Robert Brackenbury; his modesty demanded that all letters and papers be destroyed after his death.
