= Greatham =

Greatham may refer to:

- Greatham, County Durham
- Greatham, Hampshire
- Greatham, West Sussex

== See also ==
- Greetham (disambiguation)
