= John Morley (cricketer) =

English cricketer

Personal information
- Full name: John Wilby Morley
- Born: 30 July 1838; Raithby, Lincolnshire, England
- Died: 24 April 1864 (aged 25) along the Mackenzie River, Queensland, Australia
- Batting: Unknown

Domestic team information
- Years: Team
- 1859–1860: Oxford University

Career statistics
Competition	First-class
Matches	4
Runs scored	47
Batting average	7.83
100s/50s	–/–
Top score	19
Catches/stumpings	1/–
- Source: Cricinfo, 24 February 2020

John Wilby Morley (30 July 1838 – 24 April 1864) was an English first-class cricketer.

The son of The Reverend William Morley, he was born in July 1838 at Raithby, Lincolnshire. He was educated at Marlborough College, before going up to Brasenose College, Oxford. While studying at Oxford, he made four appearances in first-class cricket for Oxford University in 1859–60, scoring a total of 47 runs with a high score of 19. Shortly after graduating from Oxford, Morley emigrated to Australia, where he died along the Mackenzie River in Queensland in April 1864.
