= Bag Enderby =

Hamlet in Lincolnshire, England

Coordinates: 53.22°N 00.01°E

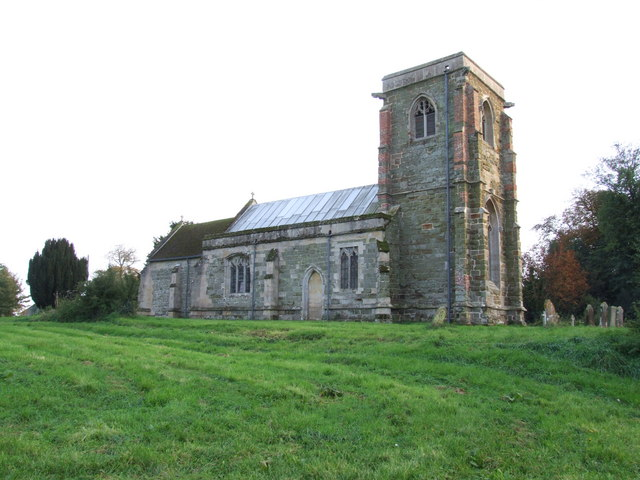
- St Margaret's Church, Bag Enderby

- Location within Lincolnshire
- OS grid reference: TF3472
  - London: 120 mi (190 km) S
- Civil parish: Greetham with Somersby
- District: East Lindsey
- Shire county: Lincolnshire
- Region: East Midlands
- Country: England
- Sovereign state: United Kingdom
- Post town: Spilsby
- Postcode district: PE23
- Police: Lincolnshire
- Fire: Lincolnshire
- Ambulance: East Midlands

Bag Enderby is a village and former civil parish, now in the parish of Greetham with Somersby, in the East Lindsey district of Lincolnshire, England. It lies just north of the A158 road, 6 miles (10 km) north-east from Horncastle and 4 miles (6 km) north-west from Partney. In 1931, the parish had a population of 29. On 1 April 1936, the parish was abolished and merged with Somersby.

Bag Enderby is little more than the buildings of Hall Farm, Ferndale Manor (which at one time was the rectory), a few cottages and a church.

The village Grade II* listed Anglican church is dedicated to St Margaret. It was built in 1407 with money bequeathed by Albinus de Enderby, who died in that year, and is commemorated on a sepulchral slab. Brass inscriptions are to Thomas and Agnes Enderby, 1390; and to John Gedney, 1533. In the chancel are effigies of Andrew and Dorothy Gedney and their four children, 1591. The font includes sculptures of Pietà, and David playing the harp. There are also fragments of old glass depicting the arms of Crowland Abbey.

The father of Alfred, Lord Tennyson was minister of the church from 1807 to 1831.

Was once home to 1960s singer Paul Hanford.

== See also ==
- Bag End
- Mavis Enderby
- Wood Enderby
- Enderby, Leicestershire
