= All Saints Church, Saltfleetby =

Coordinates: 53.3906°N 0.1867°E

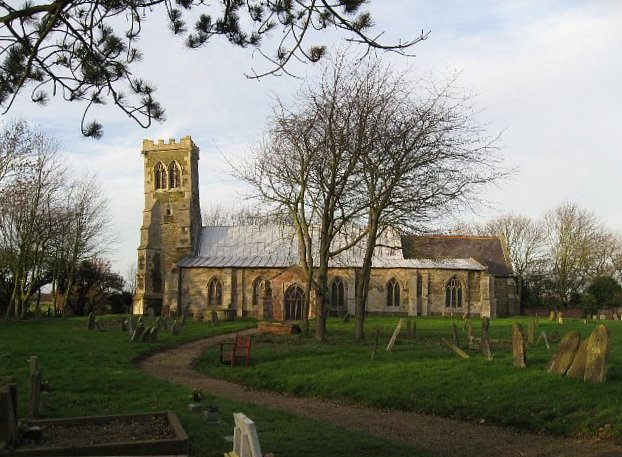
- All Saints Church, Saltfleetby, from the south

- Location in Lincolnshire
- OS grid reference: TF 45518 90416
- Location: Saltfleetby All Saints, Lincolnshire
- Country: England
- Denomination: Anglican
- Website: Churches Conservation Trust

History
- Dedication: All Saints

Architecture
- Functional status: Redundant
- Heritage designation: Grade I
- Designated: 9 March 1967
- Architectural type: Church
- Style: Norman, Gothic

Specifications
- Materials: Greenstone, limestone and ironstone

All Saints Church, Saltfleetby, is a redundant Anglican church in the village of Saltfleetby All Saints, Lincolnshire, England. It is recorded in the National Heritage List for England as a designated Grade I listed building, and is under the care of the Churches Conservation Trust. The church stands in the marshland of Lincolnshire, and has a leaning west tower.

== History ==
The church dates from the 12th century, with alterations and additions in each of the following three centuries, in 1611, and in 1873. Inside are fragments of a building probably dating to about 1150. It was built in the Early English and Perpendicular styles. It was repaired in 1886 by R. J. Withers. The church was declared redundant in November 1973, and was vested in the Redundant Churches Fund (the forerunner of the Churches Conservation Trust) during the same year.

== Architecture ==
=== Exterior ===
All Saints is constructed in a variety of materials; coursed greenstone, limestone and ironstone rubble, with limestone dressings. It contains some brick, and parts of it are rendered. The roofs are in lead and slate, with ridge tiles. Its plan consists of a nave with a south aisle and a south porch, a chancel with a southeast chapel, and a west tower. The tower dates from the late 12th century, and was raised in the 15th century. On its corners are large diagonal buttresses which were added in 1886, the southeast buttress containing a stair turret. The tower is in three stages with a battlemented parapet and gargoyles at the corners. In the bottom stage on the west side are two central lancet windows, one above the other. In the middle stage are rectangular windows on the north, west and south sides, together with the outlines of blocked 12th-century round-headed bell openings on each side. The top stage, which dates from the 15th century, contains a pair of two-light bell openings on each side.

In the north wall of the nave are two single-light windows flanking a pointed doorway, and to the east of these are large three-light rectangular windows. The north wall of the chancel contains two pointed windows dating from about 1300, and two lancet windows. The east wall has a large pointed window, and in the south wall is a three-light rectangular window. Along the south wall of the aisle are pilaster buttresses with larger buttress alongside, the latter being added in 1886. Towards the east end of the wall is a three-light pointed window dating from the 15th century. Along the rest of the wall are four windows with Y-tracery, and between the middle two of these is the porch. There is another similar window in the west wall of the aisle. The porch is gabled and dates from the 15th century. It has angle buttresses and a pointed doorway. Above the doorway is an inscription in Latin and shields. Inside the porch are benches. The doorway into the church dates from the 14th century.

=== Interior ===
The tower arch dates from the early 13th century. The arcade is from about 1200, and is in four bays, plus a smaller bay to the west. It has pointed arches carried on round piers. The pointed chancel arch dates from the middle of the 12th century. There are panelled 14th-century screens between the nave and the chancel, and between the chancel and the chapel. The chancel has a double south arcade, an aumbry in its north wall and a piscina in the south wall. In the chapel is a carved stone reredos. There are two pulpits. One is in Jacobean style and is ornately carved; the other dates from the early 17th century and was donated to the church by Oriel College, Oxford. Also in the church is an 18th-century box pew. The font has a 13th-century octagonal bowl carried on 14th-century shafts, standing on a 15th-century richly carved octagonal base.

== See also ==
- List of churches preserved by the Churches Conservation Trust in the East of England
- St Peter's Church, Saltfleetby
