= Horncastle Roman walls =

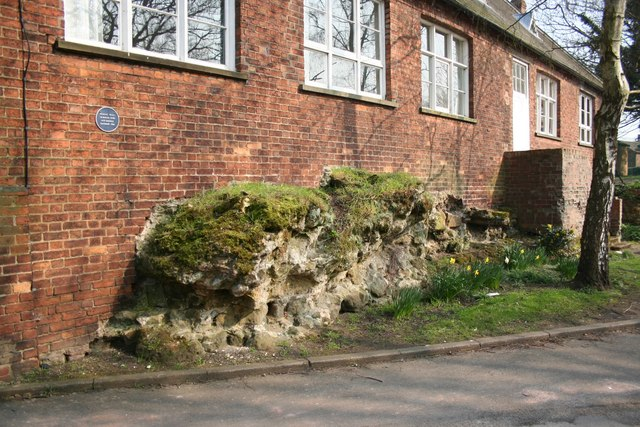
- Interactive map of Horncastle Roman walls
- 53.2081°N 0.1155°W
- Type: Ancient Roman defensive walls

Listed Building – Grade I
- Official name: Roman wall now in lobby of public library
- Designated: 7 December 1966
- Reference no.: 1262504

Listed Building – Grade I
- Official name: Roman wall
- Designated: 7 December 1966
- Reference no.: 1262704

Listed Building – Grade I
- Official name: Roman wall embedded in clinic building
- Designated: 7 December 1966
- Reference no.: 1251668

Listed Building – Grade I
- Official name: Roman wall to rear of the manor house
- Designated: 7 December 1966
- Reference no.: 1262720

Listed Building – Grade I
- Official name: Section of Roman wall to rear of No. 5
- Designated: 7 December 1966
- Reference no.: 1063769

Listed Building – Grade I
- Official name: Roman wall
- Designated: 25 March 1987
- Reference no.: 1251946

The Roman walls at Horncastle form the remnants of the defensive wall of a Roman castra in the town of Horncastle, Lincolnshire, England. The six remaining parts of the wall are all Grade I listed structures, and are collectively a scheduled monument.

== History ==
A settlement existed at Horncastle since Neolithic times. In the late 3rd century, or the early 4th, the Roman occupiers of Britain established a fort at the site, at the intersection of the River Bain and the River Waring. The name Banovallum (Wall on the River Bain) was suggested as the name of the fort in the 19th century, but this may refer to the nearby town of Caistor.

William Stukeley mapped the site in 1722 when the walls were in a more complete state of preservation. At this time the walls stood in a more-or-less continuous run, and parts were up to four yards high.

In 1998 the wall was placed on Historic England's Heritage at Risk Register having decayed over many years, in part due to weather erosion and in part due to the illegal removal of stones. In 2021 a decade-long fundraising campaign allowed the completion of a major conservation project supported by Historic England which aimed to conserve and preserve the walls. Further work was undertaken in 2023, and more is planned.

== Description ==
The fort followed the standard plan for a Roman castra, a rectangular site with four corner towers and gates giving access on three sides. The enclosed area amounted to about seven acres. Nicholas Antram, in his Lincolnshire volume of the Pevsner Buildings of England series, revised and reissued in 2002, notes that there is currently little archaeological understanding of the internal layout of the fort. The walls exist as standing masonry structures with further elements buried underground. Most of the standing elements have been incorporated into later structures, such as the best-preserved accessible section which now forms part of a wall in Horncastle Library. (Note: Many of the best preserved elements of the walls are located on private land and are not publicly accessible.) The six sections of remaining wall have separate Grade I listings, and are collectively a scheduled monument.

== Sources ==
- Pevsner, Nikolaus; Harris, John; Antram, Nicholas (2002). Lincolnshire. The Buildings of England. New Haven, US and London: Yale University Press. ISBN 0-300-09620-8.
