= St Benedict's Church, Haltham-on-Bain =

Coordinates: 53.1571°N 0.1379°W

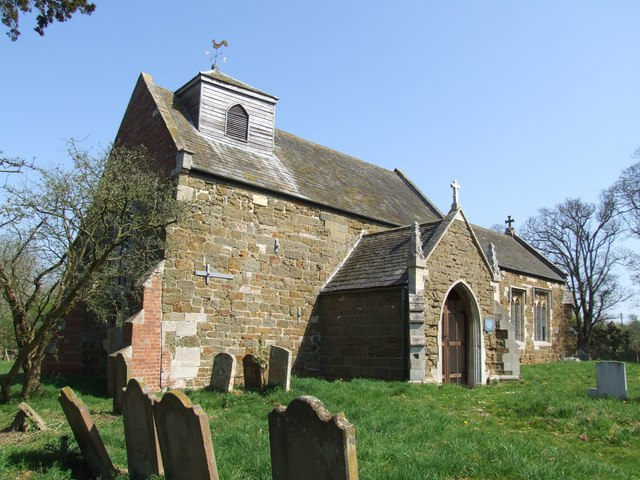
- St Benedict's Church, Haltham-on-Bain, from the southwest

- Location in Lincolnshire
- OS grid reference: TF 246 638
- Location: Haltham-on-Bain, Lincolnshire
- Country: England
- Denomination: Anglican
- Website: Churches Conservation Trust

History
- Dedication: Saint Benedict

Architecture
- Functional status: Redundant
- Heritage designation: Grade I
- Designated: 14 September 1966
- Architectural type: Church
- Style: Norman, Gothic

Specifications
- Materials: Greenstone with limestone dressings and some red brick. Roofs slated

St Benedict's Church is a redundant Anglican church in the village of Haltham-on-Bain, Lincolnshire, England. It is recorded in the National Heritage List for England as a designated Grade I listed building, and is under the care of the Churches Conservation Trust. It stands between the River Bain and the A153 road connecting Horncastle with Coningsby.

== History ==
The church dates from the early 12th century. Alterations and additions were made later during that century, in the late 13th century, and in the 14th and the 15th centuries. In 1842 it was described as "an ancient structure, which has suffered much from the hand of time...". The church was restored in 1880 and again in 1891, the latter restoration increasing the seating from 67 to 140. It was declared redundant in October 1977.

== Architecture ==
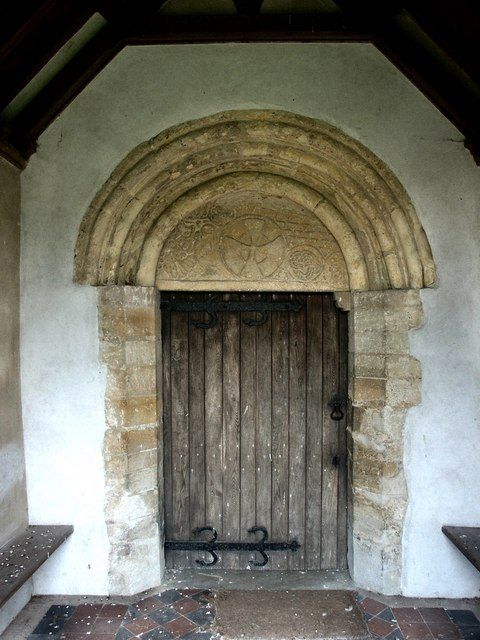
Norman doorway, with an ornate tympanum above

=== Exterior ===
St Benedict's is constructed in greenstone rubble with limestone ashlar dressings. The gables are in red brick, and red brick has been used in places for patching. The roofs are slated, and the bellcote is timber boarded. Its plan consists of a nave with a north aisle and a south porch, and a chancel. The bellcote sits towards the west end of the nave roof. At the west end of the church is a 14th-century doorway above which is a three-light window dating from the 15th century. In the west gable are two re-set medieval stones carved with heads. The north aisle has a two-light window in the north wall, a blocked doorway, a two-light and a three-light window in the north wall, and a three-light window in the east wall. The north wall of the chancel contains a two-light and a three-light window and two blocked ogee-headed windows. The east window has four lights and contains Decorated tracery. In the south wall of the chancel are a two-light and a three-light window, two ogee-headed windows, and an ogee-headed doorway. The south wall of the nave contains a two-light 13th-century window with Y-tracery, The gabled porch dates from the 14th century. It has an arched doorway, stepped angle buttresses with crocketted pinnacles and a cross finial. The inner doorway is Norman in style, with a round head, three orders of roll moulding, and a carved tympanum containing a Maltese cross in a circle, a fan-shaped shell to its left, and a knot in a circle to the right.

=== Interior ===
The arcade between the nave and the north aisle has three bays with octagonal piers. The two bays to the east have late-12th-century rounded arches, and the west bay has a pointed arch, probably dating from the 13th century. The chancel arch is pointed and dates from the 19th century. In the chancel are a 14th-century piscina with two ogee arches, four brackets for statues, and an aumbry. The pulpit dates from the 18th century; above it is a tester, and below it are seats in boxes. Arranged around the pulpit are pews dating from various periods facing in different directions. Some of these are family pews which have been reconstructed using wood from a 15th-century screen. The octagonal font dates from the 14th century, its bowl being carved with fleurons. Also inside the church are boards painted with the royal arms of Charles I and biblical texts.

== External features ==
In the churchyard is a 14th-century cross consisting of an octagonal shaft on a square base. It is designated as a Grade II listed building.

== See also ==
- List of churches preserved by the Churches Conservation Trust in the East of England
