= Mavis Enderby =

Hamlet and civil parish in the East Lindsey district of Lincolnshire, England

Coordinates: 53°10′38″N 0°02′10″E

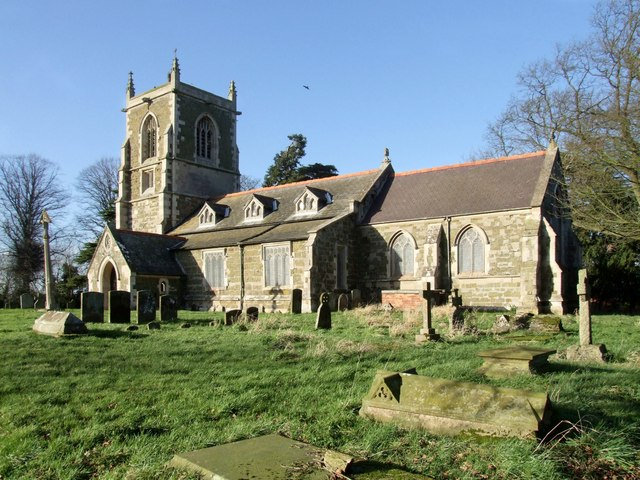
- Church of St Michael, Mavis Enderby

- Location within Lincolnshire
- OS grid reference: TF361663
  - London: 115 mi (185 km) S
- District: East Lindsey
- Shire county: Lincolnshire
- Region: East Midlands
- Country: England
- Sovereign state: United Kingdom
- Post town: Spilsby
- Postcode district: PE23
- Police: Lincolnshire
- Fire: Lincolnshire
- Ambulance: East Midlands
- UK Parliament: Louth and Horncastle

Mavis Enderby is a hamlet and civil parish in the East Lindsey district of Lincolnshire, England. It lies in the Lincolnshire Wolds, 4.5 miles (7 km) east from Horncastle.

== History ==
An early reference may be seen in 1349 when both parts of the name appear to end in "by", i.e. Maleby Senderby A later spelling, 1430, may be "Malvyssh Enderby"

== Literary references ==
Mavis Enderby had a ring of bells named after it, called The Brides of Enderby, which is mentioned in Jean Ingelow's poem The High Tide on the Coast of Lincolnshire 1571: in the poem, the ringing of the Enderby bells is the generally recognised signal of approaching danger to the neighbouring countryside: "Came down that kindly message free, the Brides of Mavis Enderby".

An extract from the poem is at the head of Rudyard Kipling's short story, At the Pit's Mouth.

Douglas Adams used the name "Mavis Enderby" in his spoof The Meaning of Liff dictionary "of things that there aren't any words for yet". Adams assigned meanings to placenames based on what he imagined them to mean, Mavis Enderby, becoming "The almost-completely-forgotten girlfriend from your distant past for whom your wife has a completely irrational jealousy and hatred".

Mavis Enderby was also used as the name of a character in Helen Fielding's Bridget Jones's Diary.

== St Michael's Church ==
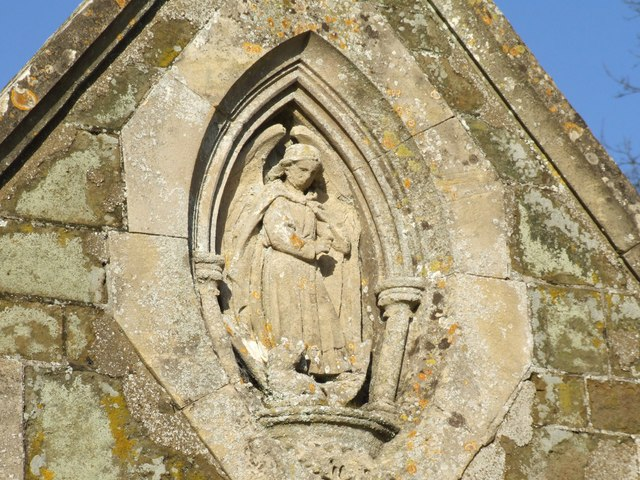
The "Mavis Enderby Angel" above the entrance porch doorway

The parish church is dedicated to St Michael. It is medieval (14th/15th centuries) with Victorian restorations by James Fowler in 1875 and C. Hodgson Fowler in 1894. It is built of greenstone rubble, with ashlar dressings and roofs in Welsh and Westmorland slate. A re-sited 11th-century Saxon grave slab stands in the doorway of the tower and a remnant of a 14th-century churchyard cross is located in the graveyard.

== See also ==
- Bag Enderby
- Wood Enderby
- Enderby, Leicestershire
