= Somersby Grange =

Coordinates: 53.2334°N 0.0110°E

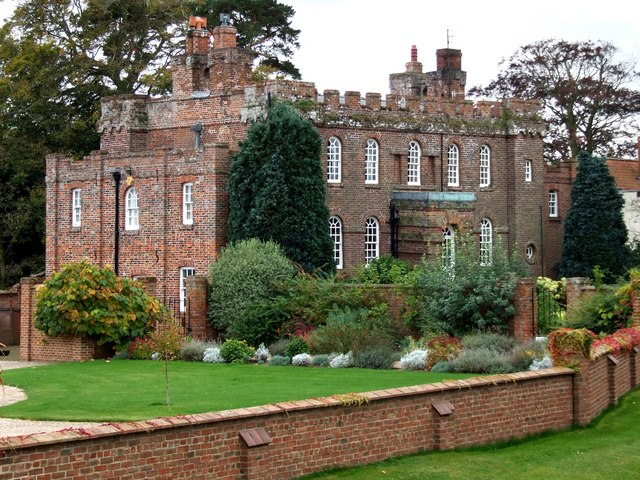
Somersby Grange

Somersby Grange is a Grade I listed Georgian country house in Somersby, Lincolnshire.

The house was built in 1722 for Robert Burton, the local lord of the manor. It is built in red brick to a rectangular plan with two storeys over a basement and has four square corner towers and a hipped slate roof behind a parapet. The parapet is embattled on the north front above the main entrance, to which a porch was later added. A two-storey extension was added to the east side to provide additional accommodation. Although in the style of Sir John Vanbrugh, the house was probably designed by Robert Alfray.

Adjacent to the house is the rectory, now called Somersby House, where Alfred Lord Tennyson was born and raised.
