= All Saints Church, Theddlethorpe =

Coordinates: 53.3705°N 0.1985°E

All Saints’ Church, Theddlethorpe
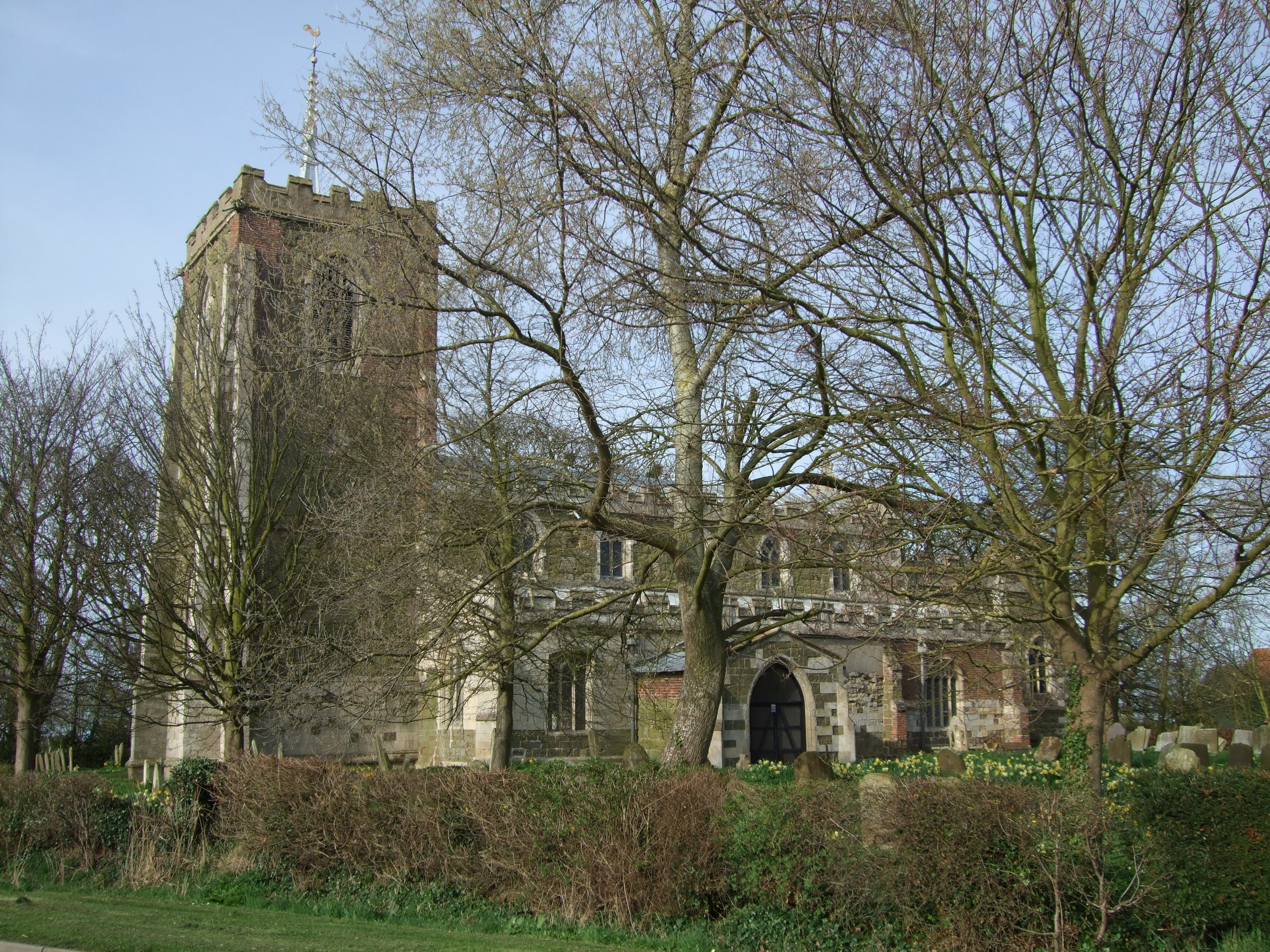
- All Saints’ Church, Theddlethorpe, from the south

- Location in Lincolnshire
- OS grid reference: TF 464 882
- Location: Theddlethorpe All Saints, Lincolnshire
- Country: England
- Denomination: Anglican
- Website: Churches Conservation Trust

Architecture
- Functional status: Redundant
- Heritage designation: Grade I
- Designated: 9 March 1967
- Architectural type: Church
- Style: Gothic

Specifications
- Materials: Greenstone and limestone with brick patching

All Saints’ Church is a redundant Anglican church in the village of Theddlethorpe All Saints, Lincolnshire, England. It is recorded in the National Heritage List for England as a designated Grade listed building, and is under the care of the Churches Conservation Trust. The church stands to the east of the A1031 road in the area of the village named Theddlethorpe All Saints, and is some 3 miles (5 km) northeast of Mablethorpe. It has been called the "Cathedral of the Marsh".

== History ==
The church dates from the 12th century, with some additions and alterations undertaken in about 1380–1400, and more in the late 17th century. Minor repairs were carried out in 1865–66. The church was declared redundant in July 1973.

== Architecture ==
=== Exterior ===
All Saints is constructed in greenstone rubble and limestone rubble, with limestone dressings. In parts the stonework has been patched with brick. The roofs are lead. Its plan consists of a nave with a clerestory, north and south aisles and a south porch, a chancel, and a west tower. The tower is in four stages, with string courses, corner buttresses, and a battlemented parapet with gargoyles at the corners. On top of the tower is a central lead-covered crocketed pinnacle. On the west side of the tower is a doorway, with a four-light window above it. The third stage contains small ogee-headed windows on the west and south sides. On each side of the top stage are three-light louvred bell openings. The north aisle has a battlemented parapet with gargoyles and corbels. The north side of the clerestory is also battlemented, and has gargoyles and pinnacles; it contains five two-light windows. In the north aisle is a two-light west window, a three-light east window, and along its north wall are four three-light windows and a doorway. The north wall of the chancel contains a blocked three-light window. The east window has three lights. The south wall of the chancel contains a three-light and a two-light window, and a priest's door. The parapet at the east end of the nave is pierced with quatrefoils and has crockets. The east wall of the south aisle also has a crocketed parapet, and corner pinnacles. The west window of the aisle has three lights, and there are two three-light windows and one four-light window in the south wall. The south porch is gabled and contains benches along the sides. The door leading into the church has an ogee head and a round rear arch.

=== Interior ===
Both arcades have five bays and are carried on octagonal piers. Incorporated into the fabric of the north wall are 12th-century stone fragments carved with chevrons, and beaked voussoirs. The roof of the nave is decorated with fleurons, and the coats of arms of the church donors. In the east wall of the south aisle is a medieval altar slab carved with crosses. Above it is a stone reredos decorated with quatrefoils, fleurons, human heads, and pinnacles. On the north walls of both aisles are fragments of painted texts. In the north aisle is another medieval altar slab, a bracket for a statue, and a doorway leading to the rood loft. The south wall of the chancel contains a triple sedilia and a piscina, and on its east wall are brackets for statues carved with human heads. There are fragments of 15th-century glass in the south aisle windows. The altar rails date from the 18th century, and the marble altar was given to the church in 1717. The chancel screen dates from the 15th century and is in seven bays. The pulpit and lectern are from the 19th century. There is another pulpit at the back of the church dating from the 17th century; this is in carved oak and was formerly in St Botolph's Church, Skidbrooke, to the north. The 16th-century pews are carved with poppyheads. The octagonal font is from the 15th century, and is decorated with quatrefoils, fleurons and human heads; it has a wooden 18th-century cover. In the church are memorials, including a brass dated 1424, 18th-century wall plaques, and a marble monument dated 1727.

== See also ==
- List of churches preserved by the Churches Conservation Trust in the East of England
