= Greetham, Lincolnshire =

Village in the East Lindsey district of Lincolnshire, England

Coordinates: 53.216648°N 0.042104°W

Greetham
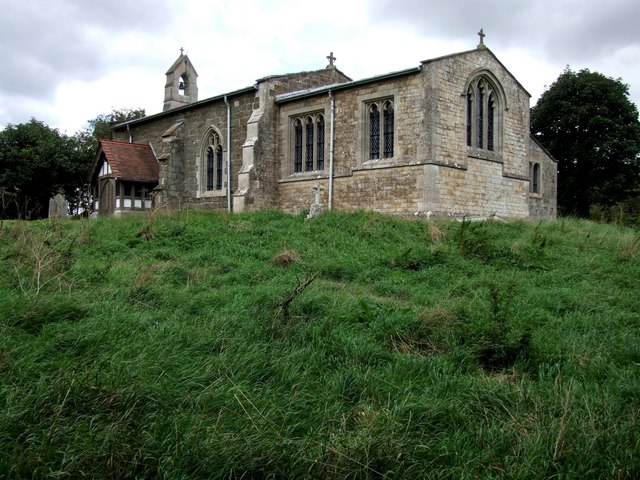
- All Saints' Church, Greetham

- Location within Lincolnshire
- OS grid reference: TF308706
  - London: 115 mi (185 km) S
- Civil parish: Greetham with Somersby
- District: East Lindsey
- Shire county: Lincolnshire
- Region: East Midlands
- Country: England
- Sovereign state: United Kingdom
- Post town: Horncastle
- Postcode district: LN9
- Police: Lincolnshire
- Fire: Lincolnshire
- Ambulance: East Midlands
- UK Parliament: Louth and Horncastle

Greetham (/ˈɡriːtəm/ GREET-əm) is a village and former civil parish, now in the parish of Greetham with Somersby, in the East Lindsey district of Lincolnshire, England. It is situated 3 miles (5 km) east from Horncastle, and 0.5 miles (0.8 km) north from the junction of the A158 and B1195 roads. To the west is High Toynton, and further to the north, Fulletby. In 1961 the parish had a population of 85. On 1 April 1987 the parish was abolished and merged with Somersby to form "Greetham with Somersby".

Greetham is listed in the 1086 Domesday Book with 56 households, which for the time was considered quite large, 300 acres (1.2 km^{2}) of meadow, a mill and a church, with Hugh d'Avranches, 1st Earl of Chester as Lord of the manor.

The church, dedicated to All Saints, is part of the Horncastle Group of churches. It is Grade II listed, dates from the 12th century, and was partly rebuilt in 1903, although the south aisle and tower have been demolished.
