= Saltfleetby =

Coastal village in Lincolnshire, England

Coordinates: 53.390°N 0.174°E

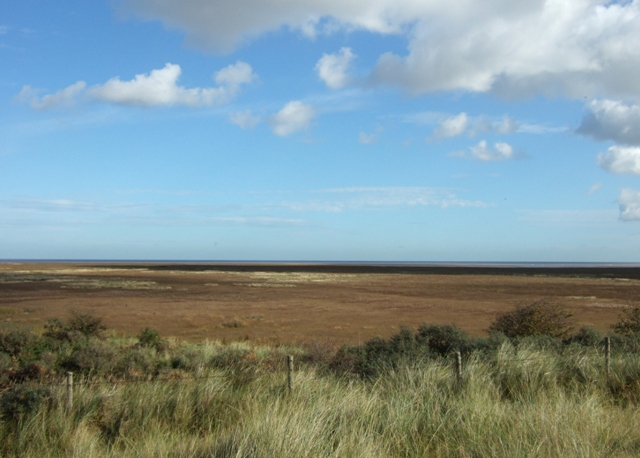
- Saltfleetby Nature Reserve

- Location within Lincolnshire
- Population: 568 (2011)
- OS grid reference: TF456910
  - London: 140 mi (230 km) S
- Civil parish: Saltfleetby
- District: East Lindsey
- Shire county: Lincolnshire
- Region: East Midlands
- Country: England
- Sovereign state: United Kingdom
- Post town: LOUTH
- Postcode district: LN11
- Police: Lincolnshire
- Fire: Lincolnshire
- Ambulance: East Midlands
- UK Parliament: Louth and Horncastle

Saltfleetby is a village and civil parish in the East Lindsey district of Lincolnshire, England on the coast of the North Sea, about 7 miles (11 km) east from Louth and 10 miles (16 km) north from Mablethorpe. The parish had a population of 599 in the 2001 Census, decreasing to 568 in the 2011 Census.

A local name for the village is Soloby.

Until 1999, Saltfleetby comprised three parishes: Saltfleetby St Peter, Saltfleetby All Saints and Saltfleetby St Clement, each one centred on the church that gave it its name.

The hamlet of Three Bridges is south of Saltfleetby St Peter.

Saltfleetby contains a wooden village hall, fishing lakes with a campsite and shop, and the Prussian Queen public house.

Saltfleetby Gas Field, north of North End Lane, is part of the neighbouring village of South Cockerington.

== Second World War ==
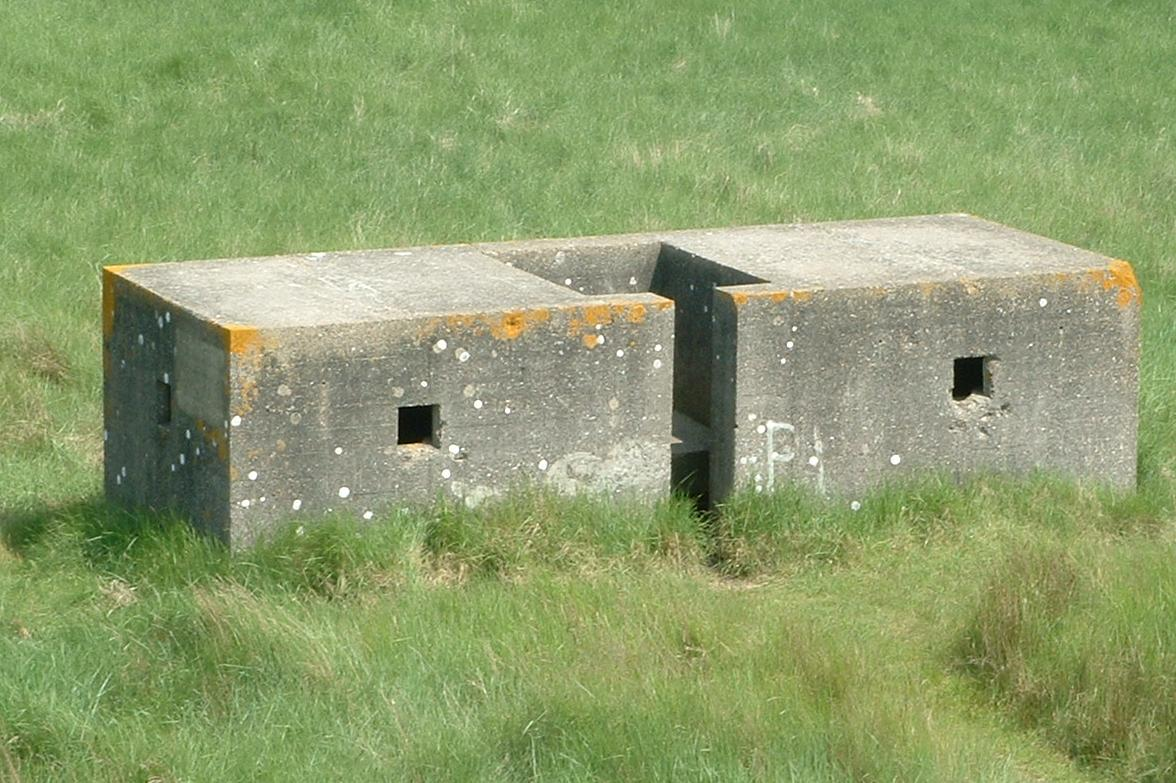
Pillbox, Lincolnshire three-bay type, Saltfleetby

The Second World War defences constructed in and around Saltfleetby have been documented by William Foot. They included extensive minefields between the Great Eau river and the dunes, a large number of pillboxes and a Home Guard shelter in the field adjacent to The Prussian Queen.

== Geography and ecology ==
A section of the parish seashore is salt marsh between Saltfleetby and the North Sea, and is part of the Saltfleetby-Theddlethorpe Dunes National Nature Reserve, which has sea dunes and both saltwater and freshwater marshes. The reserve is one of only around 60 places in the UK where the natterjack toad is found. Many halophyte (salt-tolerating) plant species are found there as well as wild orchids. Grey seals breed further north in Donna Nook nature reserve within the Saltfleet and North Somercotes parishes.

== See also ==
- Saltfleetby spindle-whorl
- All Saints Church, Saltfleetby
- St Peter's Church, Saltfleetby
