= Yarburgh =

Village and civil parish in the East Lindsey district of Lincolnshire, England

Coordinates: 53.41711°N 0.02805°E

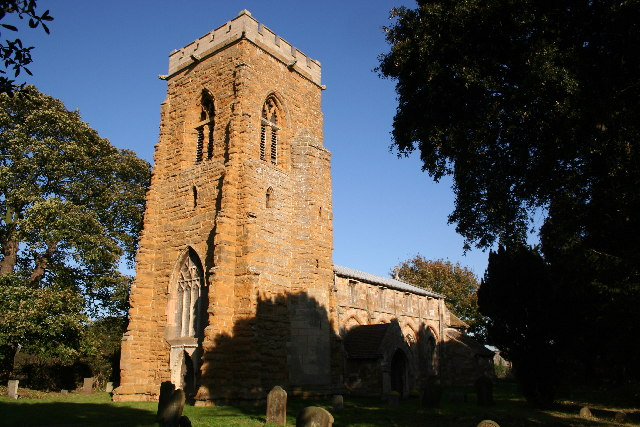
- St John the Baptist's Church, Yarburgh

- Location within Lincolnshire
- Population: 158 (2011)
- OS grid reference: TF348930
  - London: 135 mi (217 km) S
- Civil parish: Yarburgh
- District: East Lindsey
- Shire county: Lincolnshire
- Region: East Midlands
- Country: England
- Sovereign state: United Kingdom
- Post town: LOUTH
- Postcode district: LN11
- Police: Lincolnshire
- Fire: Lincolnshire
- Ambulance: East Midlands

Yarburgh is a village and civil parish in the East Lindsey district of Lincolnshire, England, and situated approximately 4 miles (6 km) north-east from the town of Louth.

The name 'Yarburgh' means 'fortification made of earth'.

St John the Baptist's Church in Yarburgh dates from at least the 13th century, although it was rebuilt after a fire in 1405 and restored in 1855. It is now in the care of The Churches Conservation Trust.
