= St Peter's Church, Saltfleetby =

Coordinates: 53.3868°N 0.1573°E

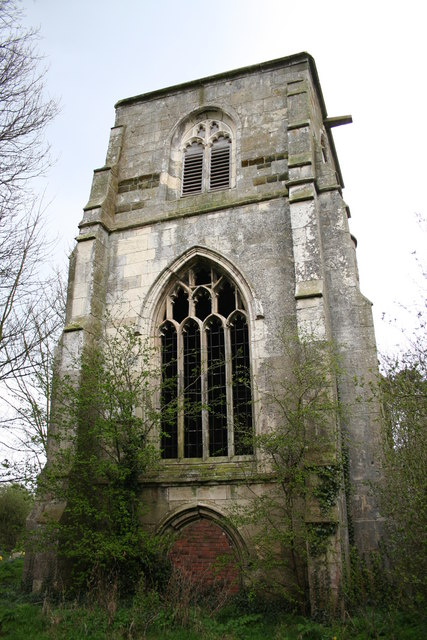
- Tower of St Peter's Church, Saltfleetby, from the west

- Location in Lincolnshire
- Location: Saltfleetby, Lincolnshire
- Country: England
- Denomination: Anglican
- Website: Friends of Friendless Churches

History
- Dedication: Saint Peter

Architecture
- Heritage designation: Grade I
- Designated: 9 March 1967
- Architectural type: Church
- Style: Gothic
- Groundbreaking: 15th century

Specifications
- Materials: Limestone, greenstone

St Peter's Church was an Anglican parish church in the village of Saltfleetby, Lincolnshire, England (grid reference TF436899). Due to subsidence, the main part of the church was moved elsewhere in the village and the tower was left at this location. The tower is recorded in the National Heritage List for England as a designated Grade I listed building, and it is now under the care of the Friends of Friendless Churches.

The tower is known locally as The Stump.

== History ==
The tower dates from the 15th century, with some re-building of the north side in the 20th century. It was taken into the care of the charity the Friends of Friendless Churches in 1976. The charity holds a 999-year lease with effect from 1 May 1976.

== Architecture ==
The older part of the tower is constructed in limestone ashlar, with greenstone rubble used in the 20th-century re-building; it also contains some red brick. It is built in three stages and has four-stage angle buttresses. In the bottom stage is a pointed doorway, above which is a string course. In the middle stage is a four-light window with rich tracery, over which is another string course. The top stage contains two-light bell openings on three sides. On the north side is a plaque to the memory of Mark Stubbs, who contributed financially to the maintenance of the tower. On the southeast corner is a stair turret, with a doorway on its north side.

== See also ==
- All Saints Church, Saltfleetby
