= St John the Baptist's Church, Yarburgh =

Coordinates: 53.4172°N 0.0312°E

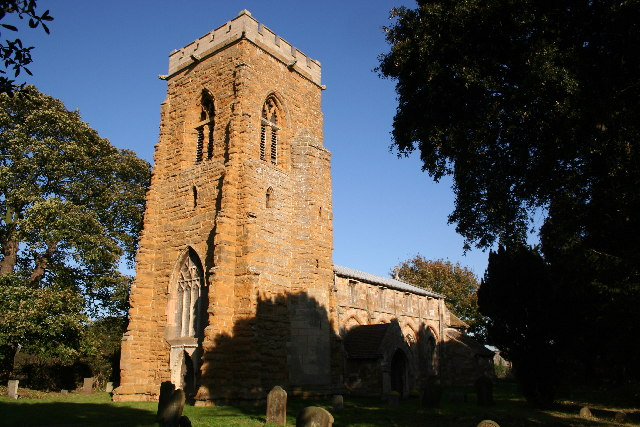
- St John the Baptist's Church, Yarburgh, from the southwest

- Location in Lincolnshire
- OS grid reference: TF 351 931
- Location: Yarburgh, Lincolnshire
- Country: England
- Denomination: Anglican
- Website: Churches Conservation Trust

History
- Dedication: Saint John the Baptist

Architecture
- Functional status: Redundant
- Heritage designation: Grade I
- Designated: 9 September 1967
- Architect: James Fowler (architecture)
- Architectural type: Church
- Style: Gothic, Gothic Revival
- Groundbreaking: 14th century
- Completed: 1855

Specifications
- Materials: Ironstone and chalk with limestone dressings

St John the Baptist's Church is a redundant Anglican church in the village of Yarburgh, Lincolnshire, England. It is recorded in the National Heritage List for England as a designated Grade I listed building, and is under the care of the Churches Conservation Trust. The village lies away from main roads, some 5 miles (8 km) northeast of Louth.

== History ==
The church dates from the 14th century. It was largely rebuilt in 1405 after a fire, and was restored in 1854–55 by the architect James Fowler of Louth, when a vestry and a south porch were added. It was declared redundant in March 1981.

== Architecture ==
=== Exterior ===
St John's is constructed in ironstone and chalk rubble, with limestone ashlar dressings. The roofs are covered with lead and tiles, the tiles being decorated in fishscale bands. Its plan consists of a nave with a clerestory, a north aisle, a south porch, a chancel, a vestry, and a west tower. The tower is built in ironstone, and is in three stages on a plinth. It has stepped corner buttresses, and a battlemented parapet. On the south side is a projecting stairway. The top stage contains two-light louvred bell openings, and in the middle stage are single-light openings with trefoil heads on all sides except the east. The church is particularly notable for the carved west doorway. In its moulded surround are leaves, tendrils, fruit, a pelican, and an inscription. In the spandrels of the arch are a coat of arms, Adam and Eve and the serpent, and a Paschal Lamb. Above the doorway is a large 15th-century four-light window. There is another 15th-century window in the west window of the north aisle, this with two lights. Along the north wall are a blocked doorway, three 15th-century three-light windows in the aisle, a similar window in the chancel and a niche for a statue. The east window in the chancel is from the 19th century with three lights. The vestry, also dating from the 19th century, has a two-light window in 15th-century style. On the south side of the chancel is a blocked 14th-century four-bay arcade which shows signs of fire damage. Three 19th-century windows in Perpendicular style have been inserted into the arcade. On both sides of the clerestory are four two-light windows. The porch is gabled, and it leads to a 14th-century inner doorway.

=== Interior ===
Inside the church the four-bay north arcade dates from the 15th century. It is carried on octagonal piers, and has 19th-century carved human heads. In the wall of the north aisle is a 14th-century pillar piscina with a crocketted ogee head surmounted by a finial. The plain octagonal font also dates from the 14th century, and the tower screen is from the 15th century. The rest of the fittings are from the 19th century. There is a ring of three bells. The oldest bell dates from about 1370, and the next from about 1500. The third bell was cast in 1831 by James Harrison III.

== See also ==
- List of churches preserved by the Churches Conservation Trust in the East of England
