= Harrington, Lincolnshire =

Hamlet and civil parish in the East Lindsey district of Lincolnshire, England

Coordinates: 53.227199°N 0.045466°E

Harrington
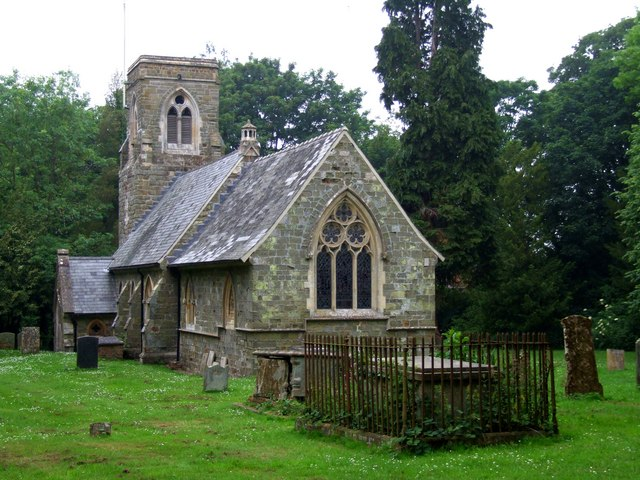
- Church of St Mary, Harrington

- Location within Lincolnshire
- Population: (2001)
- OS grid reference: TF366719
  - London: 120 mi (190 km) S
- District: East Lindsey
- Shire county: Lincolnshire
- Region: East Midlands
- Country: England
- Sovereign state: United Kingdom
- Post town: Spilsby
- Postcode district: PE23
- Police: Lincolnshire
- Fire: Lincolnshire
- Ambulance: East Midlands
- UK Parliament: Louth and Horncastle

Harrington is a hamlet and civil parish in the East Lindsey district of Lincolnshire, England. It is situated 6 miles (10 km) south-west from Alford, and 5 miles (8.0 km) north-west from Spilsby.

== History ==
Harrington is not listed in Domesday Book of 1086. In the 14th century the manor of Harrington passed from the de Harington family to the Copledyke family, and in 1673 the estate was bought by Vincent Amcotts.

== Landmarks ==
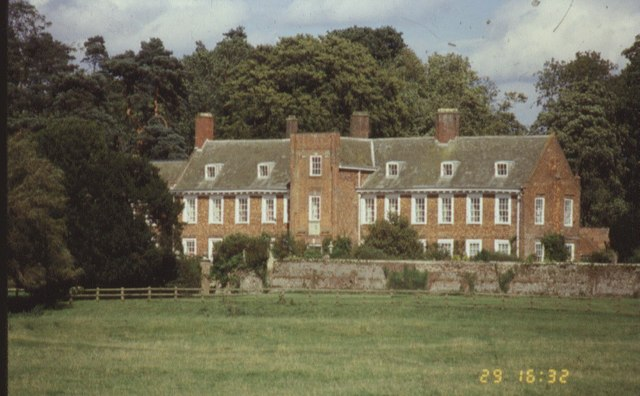
Harrington Hall

The parish church is a Grade II* listed building dedicated to Saint Mary, dating from the 13th century, and largely rebuilt in 1854-55 by Samuel Sanders Teulon. In the south side of the nave is a tomb containing the 14th-century effigy of a knight in chain mail. Under the tower is the black stone tomb of John Copledike who died in 1557 and his wife who died in 1552. In the chancel is a further tomb to John Copledike who died in 1585 and his wife who died 1582, and an alabaster memorial to Francis Copuldyck and his wife and family dated 1599.
