= St Botolph's Church, Skidbrooke =

Coordinates: 53.4162°N 0.1651°E

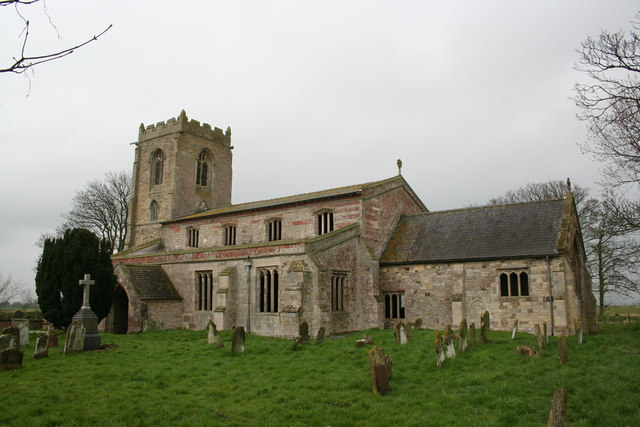
- St Botolph's Church, Skidbrooke, from the southeast

- Location in Lincolnshire
- OS grid reference: TF439932
- Location: Skidbrooke, Lincolnshire
- Country: England
- Denomination: Anglican
- Website: Churches Conservation Trust

History
- Dedication: Saint Botolph

Architecture
- Functional status: Redundant
- Heritage designation: Grade I
- Designated: 9 March 1967
- Architectural type: Church
- Style: Gothic

Specifications
- Materials: Limestone and brick Slate roofs

St Botolph's Church is a redundant Anglican church near the village of Skidbrooke, Lincolnshire, England. It is recorded in the National Heritage List for England as a designated Grade I listed building, and is under the care of the Churches Conservation Trust. It stands in an isolated position in the Lincolnshire marshlands, about 7 miles (11 km) northeast of Louth, and to the west of the A1031 road.

== History ==
The church dates from the early 13th century, with alterations and additions from the 14th and 15th centuries, in 1854 and 1871, and during the 20th century. It was declared redundant in November 1973.

== Architecture ==
=== Exterior ===
St Botolph's is constructed in limestone and brick with some rendering. The roofs are in slate, with stone coped gables. Brick is used on the parapets of the aisle, the east gable of the nave, and on the eaves of the clerestory. Its plan consists of a nave with a clerestory and north and south aisles, a south porch, a chancel and a west tower. The tower stands on a moulded plinth and is supported by stepped angle buttresses. It has a west doorway with a pointed arch, above which is a window with three ogee-headed lights. A moulded string course separates the two stages. In the upper stage are two-light windows on the north, west and south sides, and above these is a two-light bell opening on each side. The parapet is battlemented, with gargoyles and plain pinnacles on the corners. On the gables at the east ends of the nave and the chancel is a cross finial. Along the north wall of the north aisle are four gabled buttresses dividing it into three bays. The central bay contains a 13th-century doorway with a pointed head, and in each lateral bay is a three-light window. The east end of the aisle has a four-light window and two buttresses. The clerestory has four three-light windows on both north and south faces. On the north side of the chancel is a three-light window and a brick buttress. The east window of the chancel is large, with five lights. On the south wall of the chancel are two three-light windows, a blocked doorway, and a buttress. There are more three-light windows, one in the east wall, and two in the south wall of the south aisle. The south porch is gabled, and to its west is another three-light window.

=== Interior ===
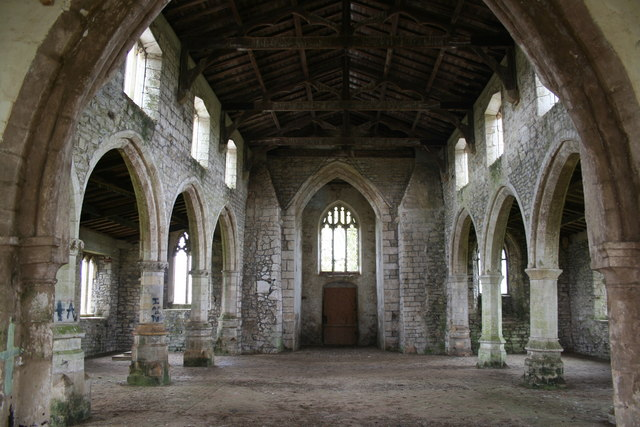
St Botolph's is noted for its well-preserved 13th-century interior

The four-bay arcades date from the early 13th century. The piers are octagonal, carried on tall octagonal plinths. The capitals of the north arcade are plain; three of the four capitals in the south arcade are carved with a variety of motifs. In the north wall of the chancel is an aumbry, and in the south wall are a piscina and a damaged sedilia. On each side of the east window is a large grotesque corbel painted white. In the chancel floor is the gravestone of a vicar of the church who died in 1413, and in the nave floor are two further gravestones with dates in the 18th century. The south aisle contains another grotesque corbel stone. The font dates from the early 13th century and consists of an octagonal bowl on an octagonal base. Also in the church are monuments dating from the 19th and early 20th centuries.

== External features ==
The churchyard contains the war graves of a Labour Corps soldier and a Coastguard of World War I, and a Merchant Navy sailor of World War II.

== Paranormal activity ==
Over the years, rumours of paranormal activity and reported sightings of ghosts in the church have attracted ghost hunters and Satanists to the premises.

Periodically, evidence has been found of occult ceremonies; remains of animal sacrifices have been left in the church, candles and fires have been lit, and pentagrams and other symbols painted on the stonework. The Churches Conservation Trust have expressed dismay at the damage to the church fabric and acts of "desecration".

== See also ==
- List of churches preserved by the Churches Conservation Trust in the East of England
