= Chapel at Raithby Hall =

Chapel in Lincolnshire, England

Coordinates: 53.18266°N 0.05442°E

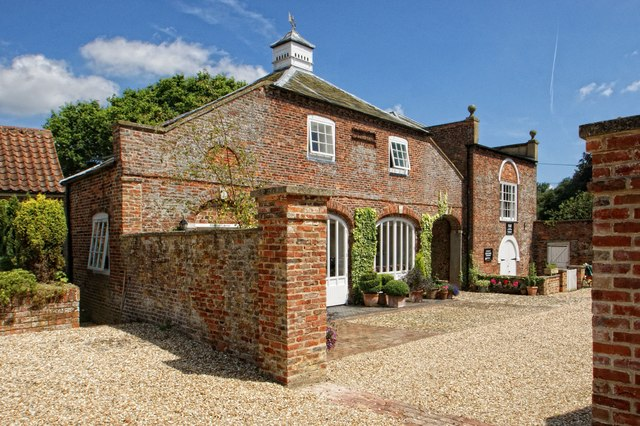
Chapel above stable (far right)

The small Methodist chapel at Raithby Hall in Raithby by Spilsby is the oldest Methodist chapel in Lincolnshire, and one of the oldest in England. It is one of the few surviving chapels that was opened by John Wesley, the founding father of Methodism, and is still in use today.

The chapel was built in brick over an existing stable in 1779 by Robert Carr Brackenbury, the well-to-do Methodist minister who built and lived at Raithby Hall and was dedicated by John Wesley on 5 July 1779. The building housing the stable and the chapel is Grade I listed.

== Services ==
John Wesley is recorded as having delivered a service here on 3 July 1788.

The chapel is now part of the Mid-Lincolnshire Methodist Circuit. Occasional services are still held at the chapel.
