= North Somercotes =

Village in the East Lindsey district of Lincolnshire

Coordinates: 53.446398°N 0.132638°E

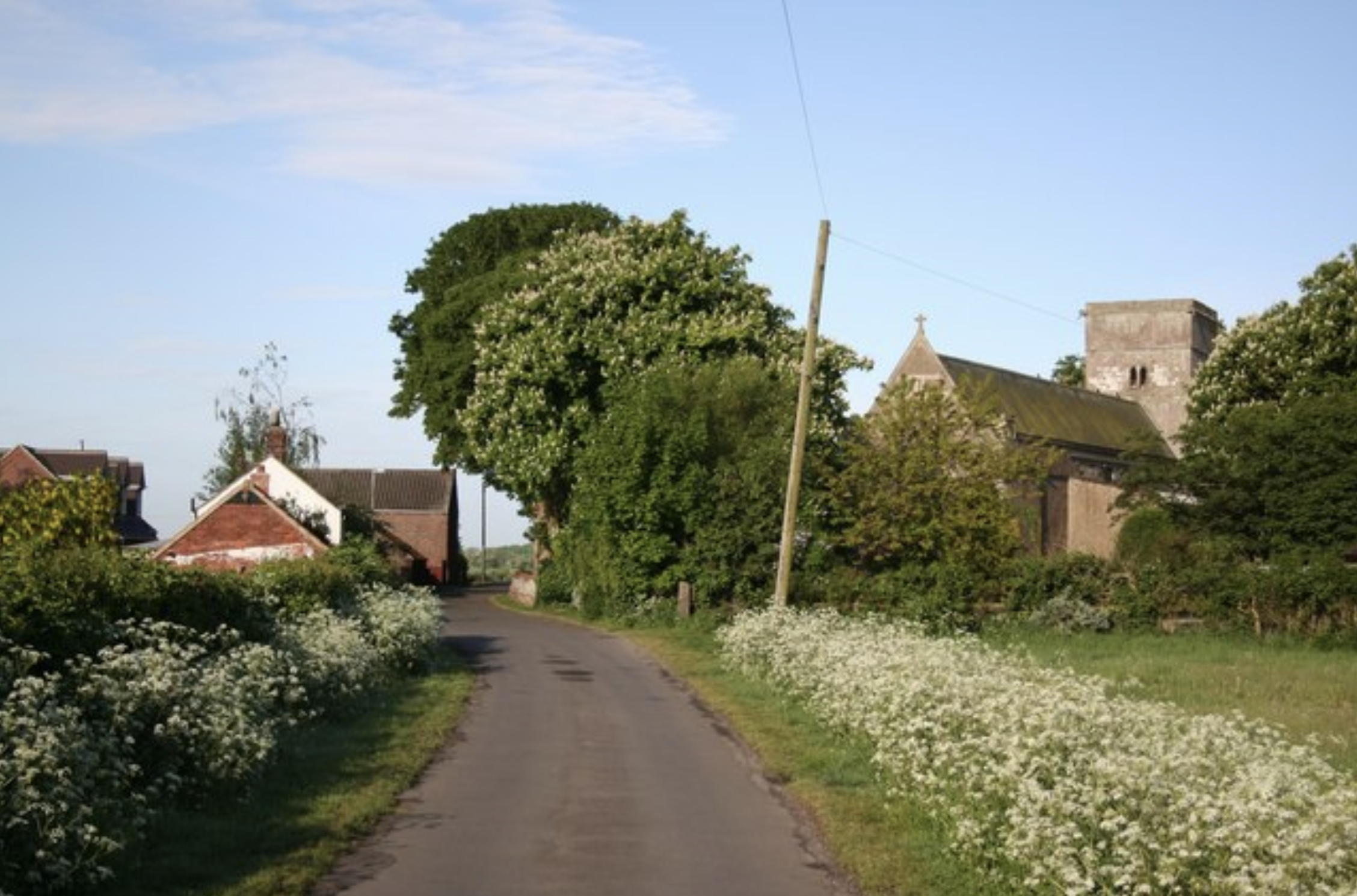
- Church End, North Somercotes

- Location within Lincolnshire
- Population: 1,732 (2011)
- OS grid reference: TF417965
  - London: 135 mi (217 km) S
- District: East Lindsey
- Shire county: Lincolnshire
- Region: East Midlands
- Country: England
- Sovereign state: United Kingdom
- Post town: Louth
- Postcode district: LN11
- Police: Lincolnshire
- Fire: Lincolnshire
- Ambulance: East Midlands
- UK Parliament: Louth and Horncastle

Churches

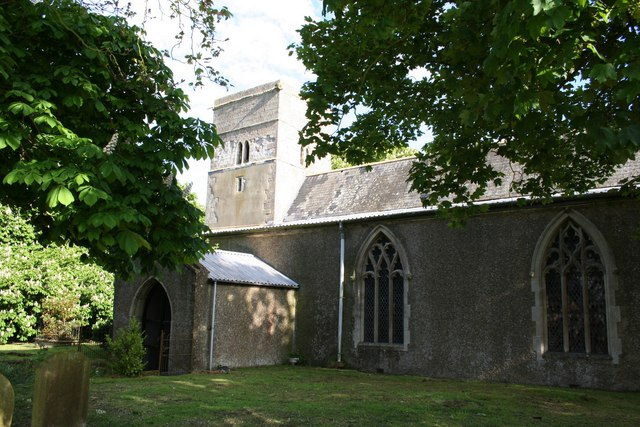
St Mary's church, North Somercotes

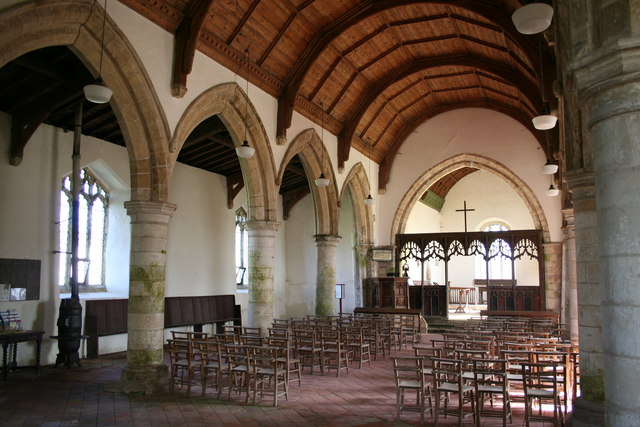
Interior of St Peter's church, South Somercotes

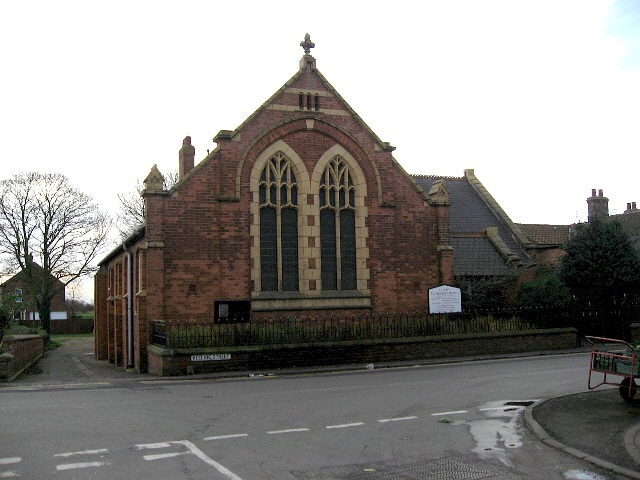
Trinity Methodist church

North Somercotes is a village near to the North Sea coast, in the district of East Lindsey and the Marshes area, of Lincolnshire, England. The village is situated midway between the towns of Mablethorpe and Cleethorpes.

In 2001 village population was 1,599, increasing at the 2011 census to 1,732.

== Governance ==
An electoral ward in the same name exists. This ward had a population at the 2011 census of 1,963.

== Culture and community ==
The village's name means "North Summer Grazing Area" as only in summer would it be dry enough for sheep and cattle to be able to graze in the area.

North Somercotes is essentially rural in character, with fields and footpaths, however, over the last decade there has been housing development.

=== Culture ===
North Somercotes previously held a village carnival once a year, usually in mid-July, in which decorated floats, with children and adults in costume, paraded village streets. A teenage village girl was selected to be the Rose Princess, who was crowned during the event, with a younger girl chosen to be the Princess's attendant. The last carnival took place in 2000. All village events ended the following year, affected by Lincolnshire County Council's attempt to keep the 2001 UK foot and mouth crisis away from the county.

A surviving North Somercotes tradition is a Pancake Race which takes place annually on Shrove Tuesday at the North Somercotes Primary School Originally the race was run along Keeling Street, the main street of the village, and part of the A1031. There are races for different age groups, and the name of the adult winner is inscribed on a trophy. Competitors race across a field, each carrying a frying pan containing a pancake, which they continuously toss. The winner is the first to cross a finishing line with their pancake intact.

A monthly village local directory, Communication, is collated by residents and distributed free-of-charge to villagers.

There is an annual 5-a-side football tournament held on the Playing Fields. It is held mid-July over a full weekend. With age groups from Under 7s all the way up to Under 15s.

In August every year there is terrier racing open to everyone in the village to attend this is held on the Playing Fields and is a popular event for villagers.

=== Community facilities ===
North Somercotes has two public houses, the Axe and Cleaver and the Bay Horse and there is an Italian Restaurant and the Travellers Joy restaurant and takeaway. The village has three convenience stores, including a Spar, Independent greengrocers ‘Churchills’ and Co-Op supermarket, one hairdressers, and a shop selling log burners. A post office, that has existed since the 1840s has now closed and moved to the Greengrocers store, the post office still provides services including motor vehicle licensing and foreign currency purchase. There are other food outlets selling Italian, Chinese and a kebab take-aways. After the North Somercotes petrol station closed in early 2001 the nearest available fuel became that in the neighbouring village of Saltfleet, or Louth, 8 miles (12.9 km) south-west, or Cleethorpes, 11 miles (17.7 km) north-east. Outside the village towards Donna Nook, is a dog rescue centre. The old petrol station site has now become the site of the Co-Op.

A youth club for 12- to 17-year-olds meets at a dedicated building on the Somercotes Academy grounds. The village is also the base for the North Somercotes Platoon, Lincolnshire Battalion of the Army Cadet Force (ACF), badged as the Royal Anglian Regiment, which meets at North Somercotes C of E Primary School on Warren Road. The ACF is one of the country's largest voluntary youth organisations for youths aged from 12 to 18.

North Somercotes' Fire Station is crewed by On Call Retained Firefighters and is one of 38 stations which is part of Lincolnshire Fire Rescue, the station attends on average 80 calls a year. The nearest police and ambulance stations are in Louth and Mablethorpe, both about 11 miles distant. The village has its own Medical Centre and dispensary (Marsh Medical Practice), comprising four GPs who divide their time between the village surgery and those in the neighbouring village of Manby.

A caravan park, Lakeside Park, is at the edge of the village. The camp has a lake, suitable for fishing and woods with public footpaths. There are tennis courts, a swimming pool, snooker room, shop, and a number of bars. Local residents pay to use the park's facilities.

The Primary School, dating back to 1691 was replaced with a new school in 1992, the previous school was one of the oldest in the East Midlands region.

== Landmarks ==
The North Somercotes' Anglican church of St Mary is a Grade I listed building at Church End. Known as a "Marshland" church, and of Early English style, it dates from the 12th century and was heavily restored in the 19th.

To the south of the village on Warren Lane is Locksley Hall, a 16th-century red-brick and ashlar Grade II listed house.

RAF Donna Nook is based at North Somercotes. The beach at Donna Nook, 1 1/2 miles from the village, is used by the RAF for target practice, with bombing carried-out at limited times during the week and outside the main seal breeding season of November and December.

In November and December, visitors are attracted to a grey seal breeding colony at Donna Nook beach. The colony is warden-controlled and visitors view seals at close quarters.

== Climate ==
The nearest weather station is at Donna Nook. The highest temperature ever recorded was 33.2 °C on 7 July 2010 and the lowest was -11.4 °C on 9 February 1986. On 31 March 2021, Donna Nook recorded its warmest March day on record, beating the previous record set the day before.

Climate data for Donna Nook 11m amsl (1992–2020) (extremes 1984–present) (Sunshine 1981-2010)
Month	Jan	Feb	Mar	Apr	May	Jun	Jul	Aug	Sep	Oct	Nov	Dec	Year
Record high °C (°F)	15.1 (59.2)	20.0 (68.0)	23.4 (74.1)	23.7 (74.7)	26.7 (80.1)	31.0 (87.8)	33.2 (91.8)	31.2 (88.2)	27.1 (80.8)	27.2 (81.0)	18.2 (64.8)	15.7 (60.3)	33.2 (91.8)
Mean maximum °C (°F)	12.6 (54.7)	13.3 (55.9)	15.9 (60.6)	19.5 (67.1)	21.5 (70.7)	25.0 (77.0)	26.5 (79.7)	26.2 (79.2)	23.2 (73.8)	19.6 (67.3)	15.3 (59.5)	12.9 (55.2)	28.0 (82.4)
Mean daily maximum °C (°F)	7.2 (45.0)	7.9 (46.2)	9.7 (49.5)	12.0 (53.6)	14.5 (58.1)	17.6 (63.7)	19.9 (67.8)	20.8 (69.4)	17.7 (63.9)	14.3 (57.7)	10.4 (50.7)	7.5 (45.5)	13.3 (55.9)
Daily mean °C (°F)	4.7 (40.5)	5.1 (41.2)	5.5 (41.9)	8.4 (47.1)	11.1 (52.0)	13.9 (57.0)	16.1 (61.0)	17.0 (62.6)	14.2 (57.6)	11.3 (52.3)	7.6 (45.7)	5.0 (41.0)	10.0 (50.0)
Mean daily minimum °C (°F)	2.2 (36.0)	2.3 (36.1)	3.2 (37.8)	4.8 (40.6)	7.6 (45.7)	10.1 (50.2)	12.3 (54.1)	13.1 (55.6)	10.6 (51.1)	8.2 (46.8)	4.8 (40.6)	2.4 (36.3)	6.8 (44.2)
Mean minimum °C (°F)	−2.4 (27.7)	−2.5 (27.5)	−1.7 (28.9)	-0.0 (32.0)	1.8 (35.2)	5.8 (42.4)	8.0 (46.4)	8.1 (46.6)	5.9 (42.6)	2.6 (36.7)	−0.3 (31.5)	−3.0 (26.6)	−4.6 (23.7)
Record low °C (°F)	−5.2 (22.6)	−11.4 (11.5)	−5.9 (21.4)	−2.6 (27.3)	−0.7 (30.7)	1.3 (34.3)	0.0 (32.0)	5.4 (41.7)	2.6 (36.7)	−2.0 (28.4)	−6.1 (21.0)	−10.2 (13.6)	−11.4 (11.5)
Average rainfall mm (inches)	42.1 (1.66)	39.4 (1.55)	33.5 (1.32)	32.9 (1.30)	51.2 (2.02)	60.4 (2.38)	56.0 (2.20)	65.0 (2.56)	45.2 (1.78)	64.1 (2.52)	60.6 (2.39)	51.2 (2.02)	601.6 (23.7)
Average rainy days (≥ 1.0 mm)	10.7	9.6	7.6	7.1	7.9	9.5	9.4	8.8	7.5	10.9	11.5	10.6	111.1
Average relative humidity (%)	85.8	83.9	81.3	77.6	79.5	80.5	80.3	79.8	81.9	83.6	87.6	87.5	82.4
Mean monthly sunshine hours	63.5	82.3	117.8	153.6	208.9	196.0	206.2	200.1	151.9	117.3	72.5	54.5	1,624.6
Source 1: Met Office
Source 2: en.tutiempo

Climate data for North Somercotes (between 2005-2015)
Month	Jan	Feb	Mar	Apr	May	Jun	Jul	Aug	Sep	Oct	Nov	Dec	Year
Average dew point °C (°F)	3 (37)	2 (36)	3 (37)	6 (43)	8 (46)	11 (52)	13 (55)	12 (54)	11 (52)	9 (48)	6 (43)	3 (37)	7 (45)
Source: Time and Date

== Transport ==
Ordnance survey maps from the 1920s show an agricultural tramway network running from The Holmes on Holmes Lane to fields around Pyes Farm and Marsh Grange. Such tramways often used WW1 narrow gauge trench railway equipment to allow year around access to soft fenland fields.

North Somercotes is served by a bus link to Louth. Busses run three times a week on Louth Market days: Wednesday, Friday and Saturday. There are buses to Grimsby and Mablethorpe at certain times of year. Cleethorpes railway station is 16 miles distant, operated by TransPennine Express and served by Northern and East Midlands Railway.

== Religion ==
Present

North Somercotes Church of England parish church of St Mary is part of the Somercotes and Grainthorpe with Conisholme group of the Deanery of Louthesk in the Diocese of Lincoln. The ecclesiastical parish is shared with South Somercotes and its church of St Peter.

A Pentecostal Church meets in the village hall.

Past

The Methodist church was formerly represented by the village's Trinity Methodist Church and was part of the Louth circuit. It was closed in November 2013.

== Media ==
In November 2003 a schoolboy, Luke Walmsley, was murdered by another pupil at the North Somercotes Birkbeck School. After Luke Walmsley's death his parents set up a Sports Foundation in his memory. The Foundation raised over £150,000. The money was used to build a new pavilion on the village playing fields, to upgrade the sports changing area and to build two new full-size sports pitches and a mini soccer pitch. Work started on the development on 4 February 2009 and was completed in September 2009.
