= Skidbrooke =

Hamlet in the East Lindsey district of Lincolnshire, England

Coordinates: 53.408792°N 0.168589°E

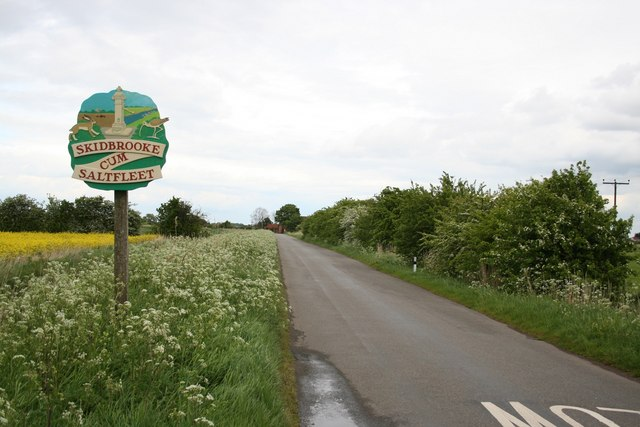
- Skidbrooke with its village sign

- Location within Lincolnshire
- Population: 523 (2001)
- OS grid reference: TF442924
  - London: 135 mi (217 km) S
- District: East Lindsey
- Shire county: Lincolnshire
- Region: East Midlands
- Country: England
- Sovereign state: United Kingdom
- Post town: Louth
- Postcode district: LN11
- Police: Lincolnshire
- Fire: Lincolnshire
- Ambulance: East Midlands
- UK Parliament: Louth and Horncastle

Skidbrooke, also called Skidbrooke cum Saltfleet, is a hamlet in the East Lindsey district of Lincolnshire, England. It is situated 10 miles (16 km) north from the town of Alford and 7 miles (11 km) east from Louth. With the hamlet of Saltfleet Haven it forms the civil parish of Skidbrooke with Saltfleet Haven.

Skidbrooke is mentioned in the 1086 Domesday Book as "Schitebroc", and recorded as being in the hundred of Louth-Eske in the South Riding of Lindsey, and as having 33 households, 3 villagers, 24 freemen and a meadow of 60 acres (0 km^{2}). In 1066 Queen Edith was Lord of the manor, which in 1086 was transferred to William I.

The parish church is dedicated to Saint Botolph. Now closed, it is cared for by the Churches Conservation Trust.

There is a Grade II listed limestone pump in the village, which is a memorial to Frederick Allen Freshney of South Somercotes, who died in May 1906 from wounds received in the Boer War.

The New Inn is a Grade II listed red-brick public house dating from the 17th century, with 18th- and 19th-century additions.

The Manor House, which dates from about 1673 with 19th-century additions, is a Grade II listed red-brick house.

Skidbrooke Grade II listed tower windmill dates from about 1770. It originally had three pairs of stones. In the late 1890s it was rebuilt gaining extra storeys, a new cap and fantail and four patent sails. It continued to work until about 1951.
