= South Somercotes =

Village and civil parish in Lincolnshire, England

Coordinates: 53.422843°N 0.129935°E

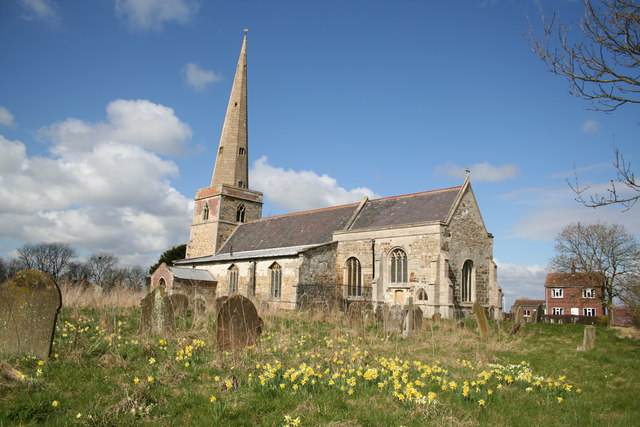
- St Peter's Church, South Somercotes

- Location within Lincolnshire
- Population: 231 (2011)
- OS grid reference: TF416938
  - London: 130 mi (210 km) S
- District: East Lindsey
- Shire county: Lincolnshire
- Region: East Midlands
- Country: England
- Sovereign state: United Kingdom
- Post town: Louth
- Postcode district: LN11
- Dialling code: 01507
- Police: Lincolnshire
- Fire: Lincolnshire
- Ambulance: East Midlands
- UK Parliament: Louth and Horncastle

South Somercotes is a village and civil parish 8 miles (13 km) north-east from Louth and approximately 2 miles (3.2 km) south from North Somercotes, Lincolnshire, England. The civil parish includes the hamlet of Scupholme.

The former Anglican church is dedicated to St Peter and is often called the "Queen of the Marsh" due to its lofty spire serving as a landmark for seaman.

The ecclesiastical parish is shared with North Somercotes and is part of the Somercotes and Grainthorpe with Conisholme group of the Deanery of Louthesk, Diocese of Lincoln. The incumbent (2013) is the Revd Sue Allison.

== History ==
The parish church of St Peter dates back to approximately 1200, but the present fabric is from the 14th to 16th centuries, and was heavily restored in 1866 and 1896. It is constructed of limestone, greenstone and ironstone coursed rubble, with some limestone ashlar from the later restorations. Declared redundant, it is now cared for by the Churches Conservation Trust.
