= Greetham with Somersby =

Civil parish in Lincolnshire, England

Coordinates: 53°13′33″N 0°00′55″W

Greetham with Somersby is a civil parish in the East Lindsey district of Lincolnshire, England. It is situated approximately 3 miles (5 km) north-east from the market town of Horncastle.

The parish comprises the villages of Greetham, Somersby, Ashby Puerorum, Bag Enderby and the hamlet of Holbeck.

Greetham with Somersby is crossed by no major roads, although the A158 Lincoln to Skegness road forms part of the southern parish boundary. The summits of Millam's Hill and Melbourne's Hill – at 260 feet (79 m) and 262 feet (80 m) – are the highest points in a parish generally between 165 feet (50 m) and 260 feet above sea level. Two small streams flow eastward into the River Lymn which flows south-eastwards through the east of the parish.

The 2001 Census recorded a Greetham with Somersby population of 161, including Ashby Puerorum and increasing to 167 at the 2011 Census.

Community politics is in the hand of a Parish meeting.
