= Waithe =

Hamlet and civil parish in the East Lindsey district of Lincolnshire, England

Coordinates: 53.486770°N 0.06863°W

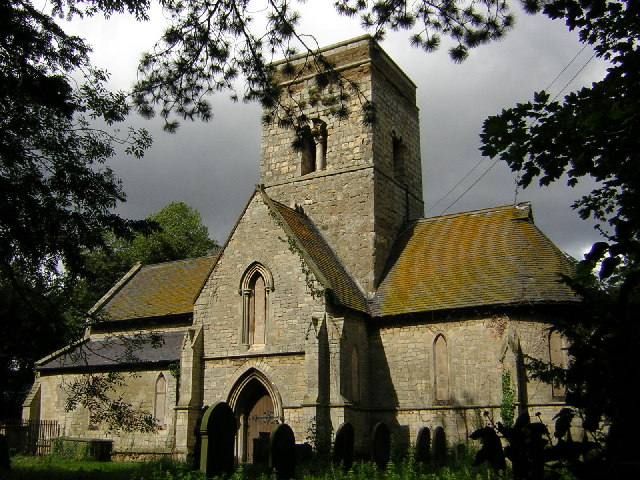
- St Martin's Church, Waithe

- Location within Lincolnshire
- OS grid reference: TA282006
  - London: 140 mi (230 km) S
- District: East Lindsey
- Shire county: Lincolnshire
- Region: East Midlands
- Country: England
- Sovereign state: United Kingdom
- Post town: Grimsby
- Postcode district: DN36
- Police: Lincolnshire
- Fire: Lincolnshire
- Ambulance: East Midlands
- UK Parliament: Louth and Horncastle

Waithe (or Waythe) is a hamlet and civil parish in the East Lindsey district of Lincolnshire, England. It is on the A16, 1 mile (1.6 km) south from Holton-le-Clay and 1 mile (1.6 km) north from North Thoresby.

== History ==
The name 'Waithe' comes from the Old English wæd meaning 'ford'.

In the Domesday Book account Waithe is written as "Wade", in the Haverstoe Hundred of the North Riding of Lindsey. In 1086 Waithe contained 30.7 households, four villagers and one freemen, 0.3 ploughlands and 5 acres (20,000 m^{2}) of meadow. In 1066 lordship of the manor was held by Siward Barn, this transferred to Odo of Bayeux in 1086, with Ivo Taillebois as Tenant-in-chief to William I.

The village is the site of a deserted medieval village, indicated by earthworks, trackways and ditch enclosures, and 13th- to 18th-century pottery finds.

Waithe is recorded in the 1872 White's Directory (under the alternative spelling of 'Waith'), as a small parish of 58 people within 780 acres (3.2 km^{2}) of "fertile" land, whose lord of the manor was also the patron of the ecclesiastical parish benefice. St Martin's Church was described as "a neat structure" of Early English style which was partly rebuilt in 1869 for more than £2,000, the cost born by the lord of the manor. The incumbent held his office under a vicarage, and lived at Grainsby where he was the rector of that parish. At the time, the parish was entitled to send one person to the almshouses at Ashby cum Fenby. Occupations listed in 1872 were the parish clerk, two farmers, one of whom was at Waith Top, a grazier, and a corn miller at Waith Mill.

In 1885 Kelly's Directory reported that agricultural production in the still 780-acre parish was chiefly wheat, oats, turnips and barley, farmed under a four-field system.

== Landmarks ==
Waithe Grade I listed redundant church is dedicated to St Martin. The church was rebuilt in 1861 by James Fowler of Louth, leaving only the Early English nave arcades and tower as elements of an earlier Saxon cruciform church. The church was repaired and conserved in 2005.

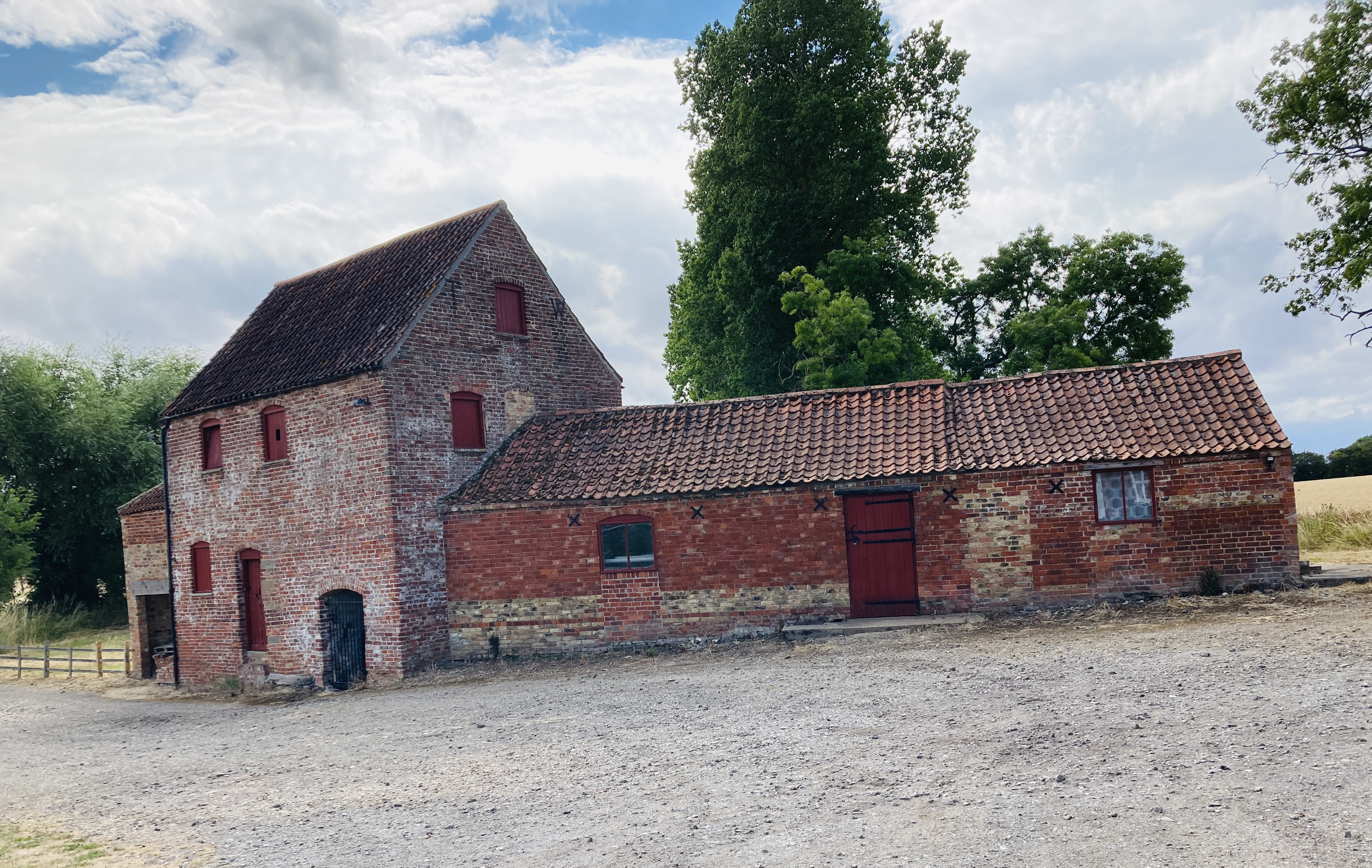
Waithe water mill in 2022

Other listed structures include Grade II Waithe Water Mill, dating from 1813.
