= Somersby, Lincolnshire =

Village in the East Lindsey district of Lincolnshire, England

Coordinates: 53.234592°N 0.01219°E

Somersby
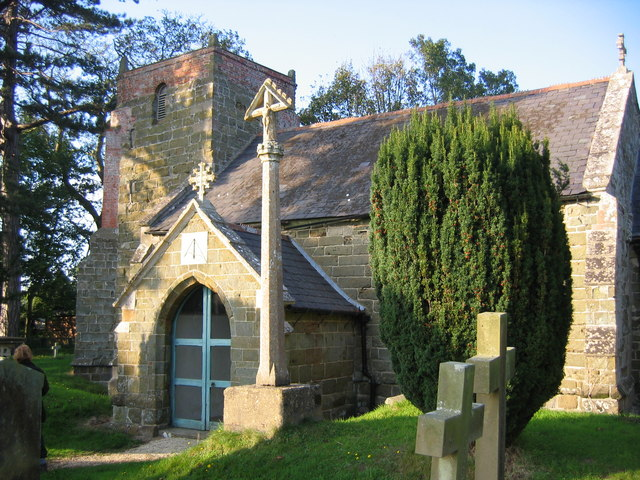
- St Margaret's Church, Somersby

- Location within Lincolnshire
- OS grid reference: TF343727
  - London: 120 mi (190 km) S
- Civil parish: Greetham with Somersby
- District: East Lindsey
- Shire county: Lincolnshire
- Region: East Midlands
- Country: England
- Sovereign state: United Kingdom
- Post town: Spilsby
- Postcode district: PE23
- Police: Lincolnshire
- Fire: Lincolnshire
- Ambulance: East Midlands
- UK Parliament: Louth and Horncastle

Somersby is a village in the civil parish of Greetham with Somersby, in the East Lindsey district of Lincolnshire, England. It is situated 6 miles (9.7 km) north-west from Spilsby and 7 miles (11 km) east-north-east from Horncastle. The village lies in the Lincolnshire Wolds, a designated Area of Outstanding Natural Beauty; the parish covers about 600 acres (2.4 km^{2}). In 1971 the parish had a population of 119. On 1 April 1987 the parish was abolished and merged with Greetham to form "Greetham with Somersby".

== Tennyson ==
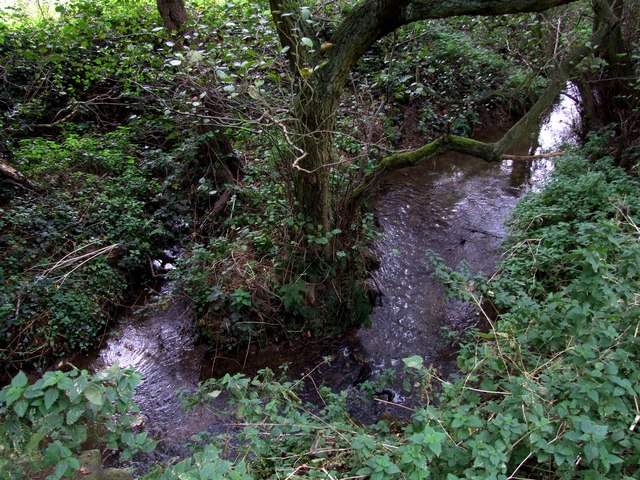
Alfred, Lord Tennyson's babbling brook

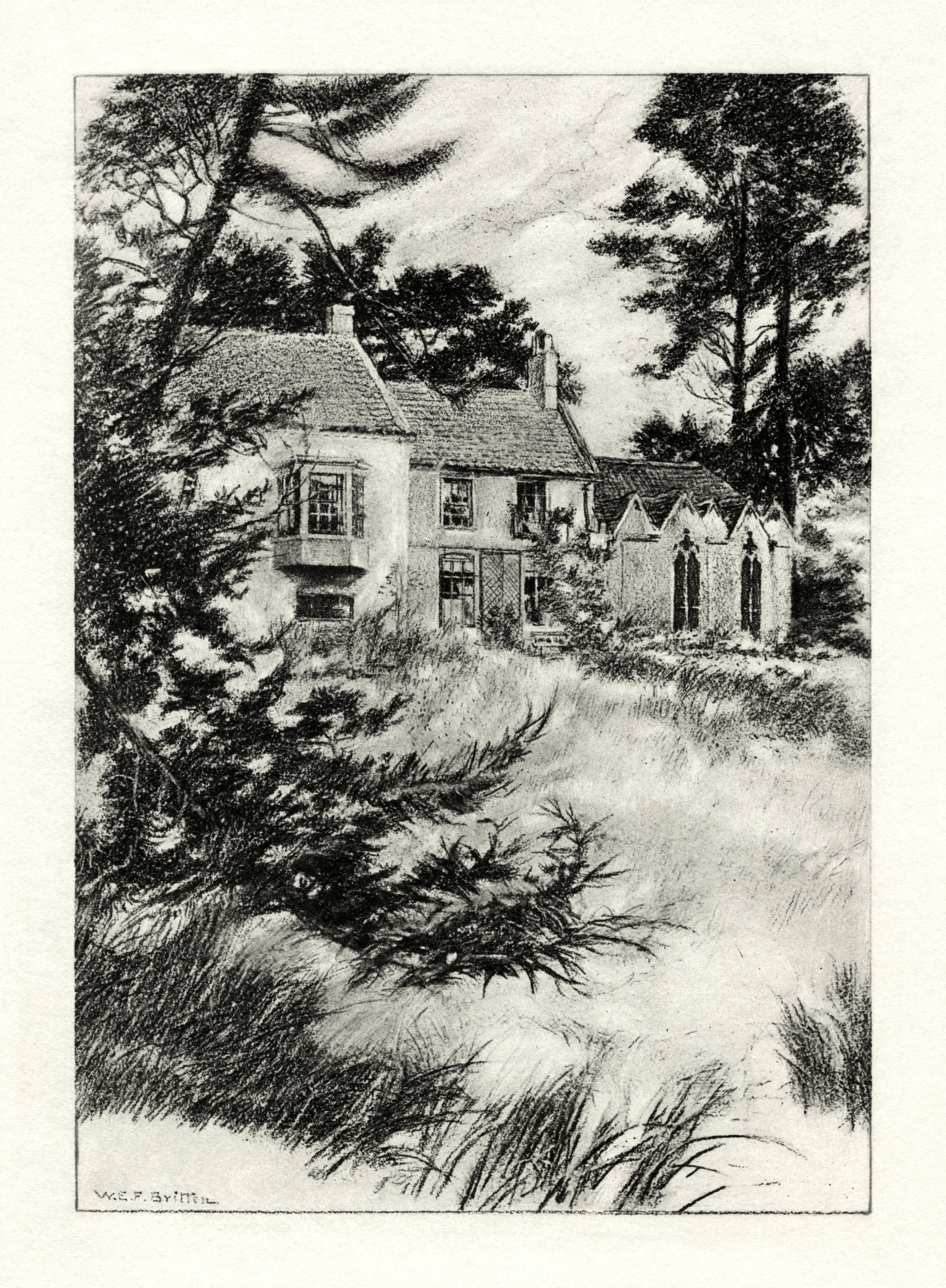
An illustration by W. E. F. Britten showing Somersby Rectory, where Tennyson was raised

Alfred, Lord Tennyson, Poet Laureate, was born and brought up in Somersby, the son of the rector, and the fourth of twelve children. When he wrote The Babbling Brook he was referring to a small stream here. Other features of the local landscape are claimed as features mentioned in Tennyson's poetry, such as "Woods that belt the grey hillside" and "The silent woody places by the home that gave me birth". In 1949 the copper beech was reported to be still standing at the former rectory which was mentioned in In Memoriam: "Unwatched, the garden bough shall sway,/The tender blossom flutter down,/Unloved, that beech will gather brown,/This maple burn itself away." The same poem also mentions leaving "the well-beloved place / Where first we gazed upon the sky". In such poems as The Lady of Shalott Tennyson uses the word "wold" for a hill in a sense found in Lincolnshire. Tennyson wrote a few poems (e.g. "The Church-warden and the curate") in the local dialect.

== Church ==
The Anglican parish church is dedicated to Saint Margaret. It is an ancient sandstone building, constructed some time before 1612, and restored between 1863 and 1865. It seats about 80 people. Alfred, Lord Tennyson, was baptised in St Margaret's.

Stone from the now disused Somersby Quarry, an outcrop of Spilsby Sandstone, was used to repair the church. This soft stone is a khaki-green colour when exposed to weathering.

== Somersby Grange ==
Somersby Grange is a Grade I listed Georgian manor house which stands adjacent to the rectory where Tennyson was born.
