= Burwell Priory =

Monastery in Lincolnshire, England

Coordinates: 53°17′47″N 0°02′02″E

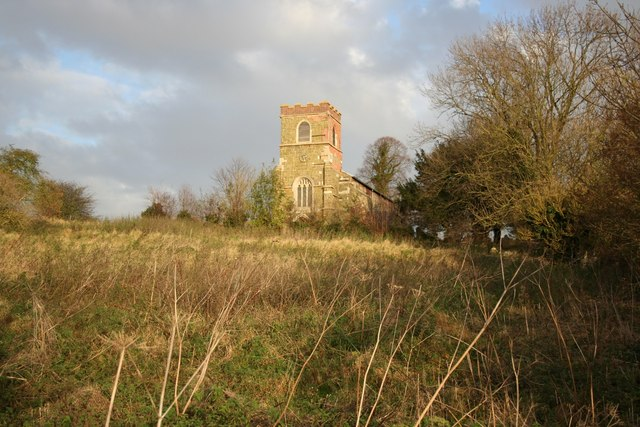
St Michael's church, Burwell. The field in the foreground is approximately the position for the earthworks mentioned in the Pastscape listing as the probable site of the Priory

Burwell Priory was a priory in the village of Burwell, Lincolnshire, England.

The priory was built around 1110 for Benedictine monks, by Ansgot of Burwell, who addressed his charter to Robert, Bishop of Lincoln 1094-1123.

The priory motherhouse was Grande-Sauve Abbey, in Aquitaine, France, which at the time was ruled by the Kings of England. When England and France went to war, the priory came under threat and was seized in 1337 and again in 1342, but restored when the Prior swore allegiance to the King. However, in 1386 the priory was again seized, and conclusion of the war meant that it was considered an alien cell. On the death of Prior Peter de Monte Ardito in 1427, the priory was found to be in a ruinous state, and it was dissolved with the land being granted to the college of Tattershall.

After this the lands were granted to Charles Brandon, 1st Duke of Suffolk.

== Priors of Burwell ==
This list adapted from the Victoria county history, there referenced.

- Gilbert, occurs before 1150
- Adam, thirteenth century
- Amfred, died 1293
- Peter Pelata, presented 1293, died 1314
- John of Louth, 1314 to 1317
- Hugh de Vallibus, presented 1317
- John de Ponte, presented 1324, died 1344
- William Arnold of Calhavet, presented 1344, occurs 1347
- Peter de Monte Ardito, occurs 1403, died 1418
- Hugh de Lespurassa, presented 1418
- Peter de Monte Ardito of Acquietan, dead in 1427
