= St Michael's Church, Burwell =

Coordinates: 53.2969°N 0.0327°E

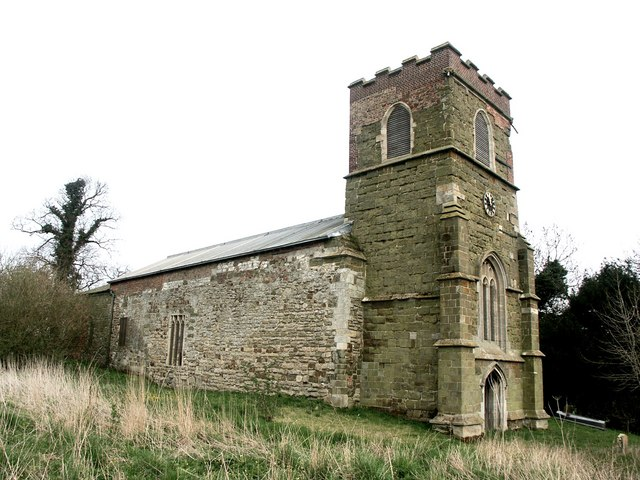
- St Michael's Church, Burwell, from the northwest

- Location in Lincolnshire
- OS grid reference: TF 356 797
- Location: Burwell, Lincolnshire
- Country: England
- Denomination: Anglican
- Website: Churches Conservation Trust

History
- Dedication: Saint Michael

Architecture
- Functional status: Redundant
- Heritage designation: Grade I
- Designated: 9 March 1967
- Architectural type: Church
- Style: Norman, Gothic

Specifications
- Materials: Green sandstone with limestone dressings Lead and slate roofs

St Michael's Church is a redundant Anglican church in the village of Burwell, Lincolnshire, England. It is recorded in the National Heritage List for England as a designated Grade I listed building, and is under the care of the Churches Conservation Trust. It stands on a hillside by the A16 road as it passes through the village.

== History ==
In the Norman era the Benedictine Burwell Priory was built near the site of the church. It is thought that St Michael's was built adjacent to the monastic buildings. It dates from the early 12th century. The chancel was added during the following century. The tower originated in the early 16th century, and additions were made to its upper stage in the late 18th century. The south porch was also built in the late 18th century. Other additions and alterations were made in the late 15th century, and in the 19th century. In 1911 the church was restored, and during that century buttresses were built to support the south wall of the nave. In May 1981 it was declared redundant.

== Architecture ==
=== Exterior ===
The church is constructed in green sandstone rubble with limestone ashlar dressings, and some red brick. The roofs are lead with some slate. Its plan is simple, consisting of a nave with a south porch, a chancel and a west tower. The tower is in three stages on a plinth, with buttresses. Above the southwest buttress is a sundial. On the west side is a doorway, over which is a three-light window extending from the bottom to the middle stage. Above this window is a clock face. On the south side of the middle stage is a small lancet window. In the top stage there are bell openings on all sides. While most of the tower is built in stone, part of the top stage and the parapet are in brick. The top of the tower is battlemented with stone copings. The upper parts of the nave walls are also in brick. In the north wall is a 15th-century rectangular three-light window, and a 20th-century two-light casement window. There is a single lancet window in the north wall of the chancel, and the east window has three lights. In the south wall of the chancel is a rectangular three-light window. Set against the wall beneath this is a table tomb dating from the late 18th century, carved with a skull and laurels. Along the south walls of the nave are two buttresses and four blocked arcades, the two towards the east being larger than the other two. The larger two arcades each contains a three-light window, and against the smaller arcades is a gabled porch.

=== Interior ===
The tower arch dates from the 15th century and has a pointed head. The chancel arch is Norman, and has a semicircular head. The capitals are carved, on one side with dancing stags, and on the other with volutes. Above the chancel arch is the fragment of a wall painting depicting a crowned head and the initial "M". It has been suggested that this represents either Queen Maud, or Margaret of Navarre. In the roof of the tower are carvings of three elongated wingless angels. The oak altar rail dates from the late 19th century, and is ornately carved with grapes and vine leaves. The reredos is also from the 19th century and consists of five arched panels containing tracery. The 15th-century font is octagonal and is carved with shields in panels. The pine pulpit is from the 17th century. Dating from the 19th century are the pews, a dado rail, and a piscina. In the church are a number of memorials. One of these, dated 1674, is in marble and includes a segmental pediment and carved festoons, a cartouche, cherubs and drapery. There are further marble memorials dating from the 18th and 19th centuries.

== See also ==
- List of churches preserved by the Churches Conservation Trust in the East of England
