= Muckton =

Village and former civil parish in the East Lindsey district of Lincolnshire, England

Coordinates: 53.311775°N 0.061940°E

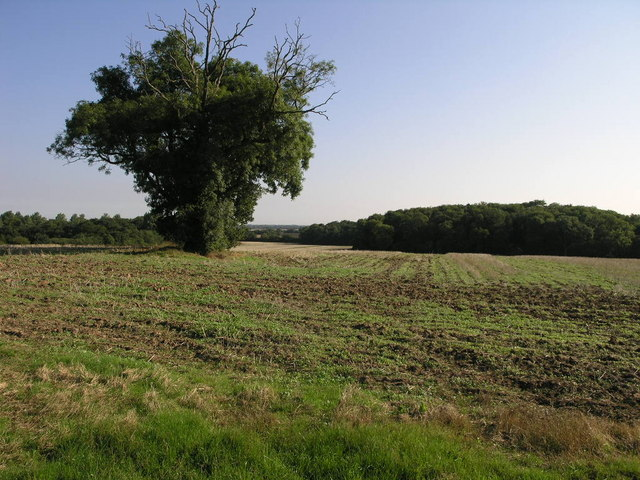
- Muckton Wood

- Location within Lincolnshire
- OS grid reference: TF374814
  - London: 125 mi (201 km) S
- District: East Lindsey
- Shire county: Lincolnshire
- Region: East Midlands
- Country: England
- Sovereign state: United Kingdom
- Post town: Louth
- Postcode district: LN11
- Dialling code: 01507
- Police: Lincolnshire
- Fire: Lincolnshire
- Ambulance: East Midlands
- UK Parliament: louth and Horncastle

Muckton is a village and former civil parish in the East Lindsey district of Lincolnshire, England. It lies between the A16 and A157 roads, 5 miles (8.0 km) south-east from Louth and approximately 1 mile (1.6 km) to the west of the village of Authorpe. It is in the Lincolnshire Wolds, a designated Area of Outstanding Natural Beauty. It is in the civil parish of Burwell.

Muckton is mentioned in the Domesday Book of 1086 as "Muchetune", and is listed as having 9 households, with Ansgot of Burwell as Lord of the manor.

The medieval church was dedicated to the Holy Trinity. It was rebuilt by James Fowler in 1878 although it retained its Norman chancel arch. It was declared redundant in May 1981 by the Diocese of Lincoln, and demolished in October 1982.

Muckton Wood is a nature reserve about 0.6 miles (0.97 km) south of the village, purchased by the Lincolnshire Wildlife Trust in 1983. It consists of ancient semi-natural woodland on a boulder clay soil.

The Greenwich Prime Zero meridian line passes through the parish.
