= Burwell, Lincolnshire =

Village and civil parish in England

Coordinates: 53.296985°N 0.031046°E

Burwell
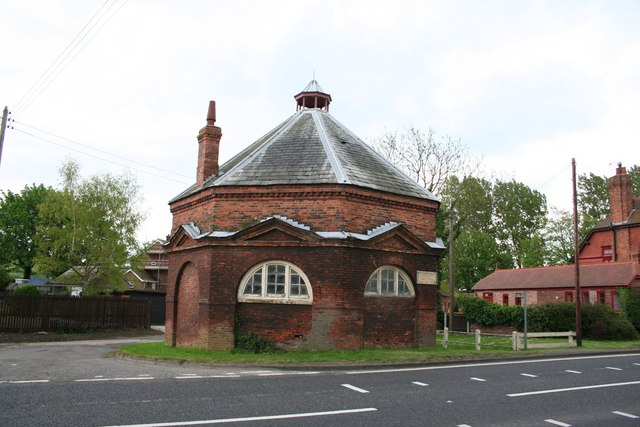
- Burwell Buttercross

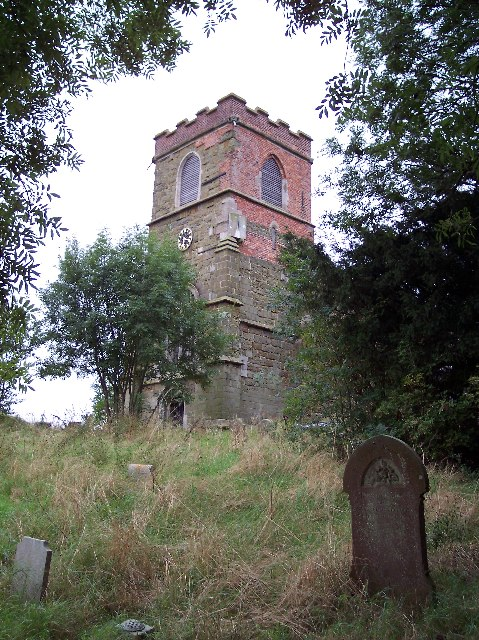
- The redundant church of St Michael

- Location within Lincolnshire
- Population: 214 (Including Maidenwell, Muckton and Ruckland. 2011)
- OS grid reference: TF354797
  - London: 125 mi (201 km) S
- District: East Lindsey
- Shire county: Lincolnshire
- Region: East Midlands
- Country: England
- Sovereign state: United Kingdom
- Post town: Louth
- Postcode district: LN11
- Police: Lincolnshire
- Fire: Lincolnshire
- Ambulance: East Midlands
- UK Parliament: Louth and Horncastle

Burwell is a small village and Civil parish in the East Lindsey district of Lincolnshire, England. It is situated on the A16 road, and north from Spilsby. The village covers approximately 2,200 acres (8.9 km^{2}).

== History ==
Now a village, Burwell was a medieval market town. Cropmarks indicated the extent of the settlement.

Burwell Priory, which once stood here, was a Benedictine monastery founded at some point before 1110 by Ansgot of Burwell. It was an alien priory belonging to Grande-Sauve Abbey in Aquitaine. It was dissolved in 1427 and sold to the college of Tattershall, along with its chapels at Authorpe, Carlton, Muckton, and Walmgate, and other lands around Burwell.

The manor house, Burwell Hall, was in Burwell Park, and was built in 1760 for Matthew Lister. It was demolished in 1958, and only the stables remain. The manor itself was previously held by Henry Percy, Duke of Northumberland; John, Duke of Bedford; Ralf, Lord Treasurer Cromwell; and Charles Brandon, Duke of Suffolk.

The parish church of Saint Michael, became redundant on 13 May 1981 and was taken over by the Redundant Churches Fund (now The Churches Conservation Trust) on 27 October 1982. It is Grade I listed. The village also had chapels of the Wesleyan Methodists and United Reformed churches, which merged in 1988 making the Wesleyan building redundant. The combined church has since closed.

Burwell District Council School was built in 1825 as a National School. It closed in December 1941 with only eleven children on the roll.

== Community ==
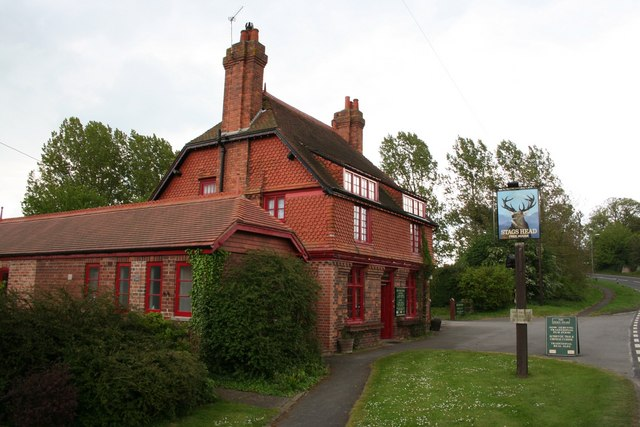
The Stag's Head

The No. 8 bus service operated by Hunts coaches connects Burwell to Alford and Louth on a Wednesday

Burwell buttercross was converted into a dovecote and is now the village hall. Dating from the beginning of the seventeenth century with later alterations, it is a Grade II listed building.

The village is part of the ecclesiastical parish of Legbourne, based at All Saints church in Legbourne.

There is one public house in the village, the Stags Head which is now closed down.
