= Grande-Sauve Abbey =

Benedictine monastery in Gironde, France

Coordinates: 44°46′07″N 0°18′42″W

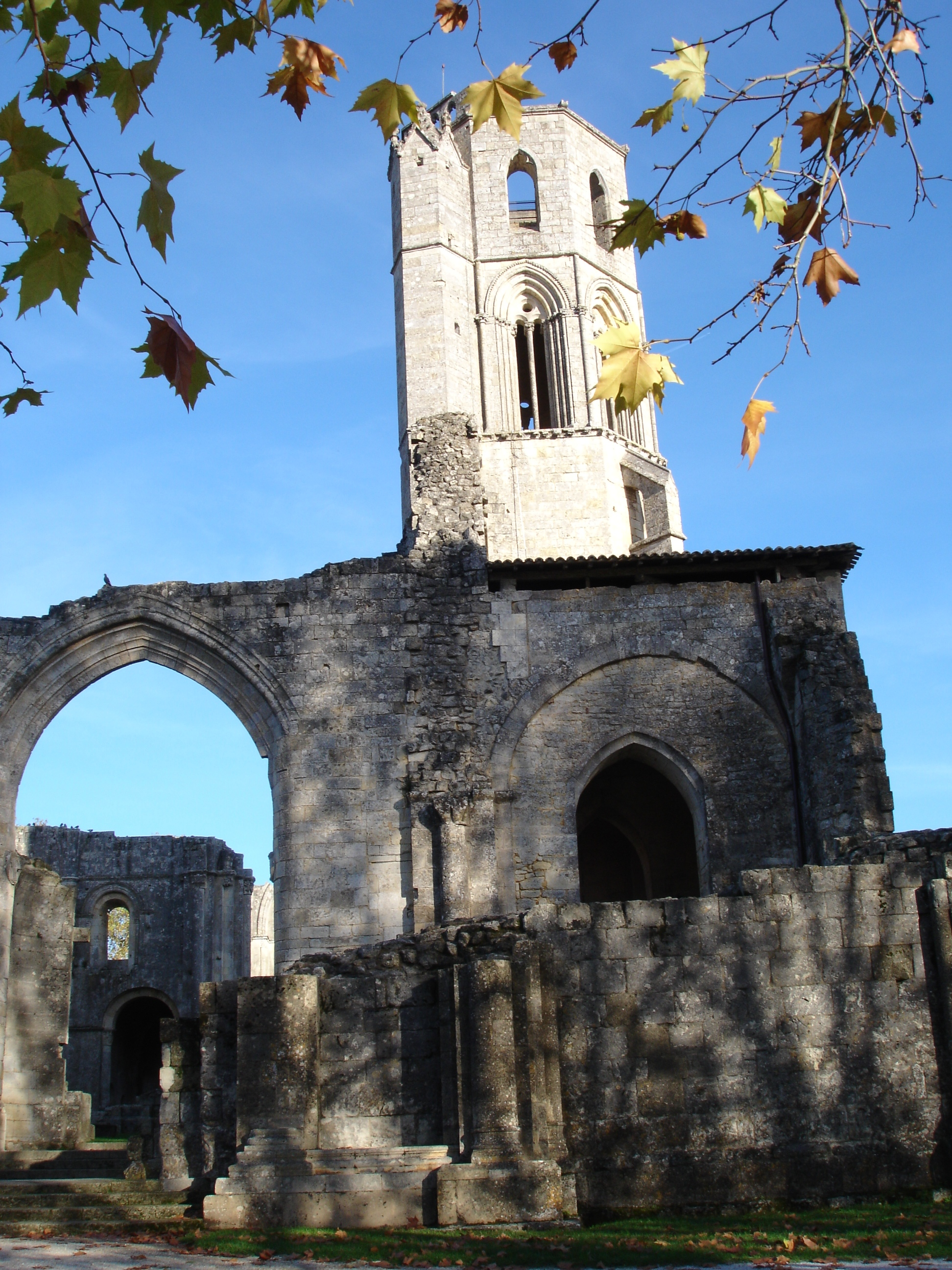
Grande-Sauve Abbey

Grande-Sauve Abbey or Sauve-Majeure Abbey is a former Benedictine monastery near the present village of La Sauve in the France department of the Gironde, in a region once heavily forested. Although now in ruins, the remains of the abbey are still of great interest in terms of Romanesque architecture, especially because of the many sculpted capitals still surviving.

In 1998 the abbey ruins were included as part of the UNESCO World Heritage Site of the pilgrimage route to St. James of Compostela.

== History ==
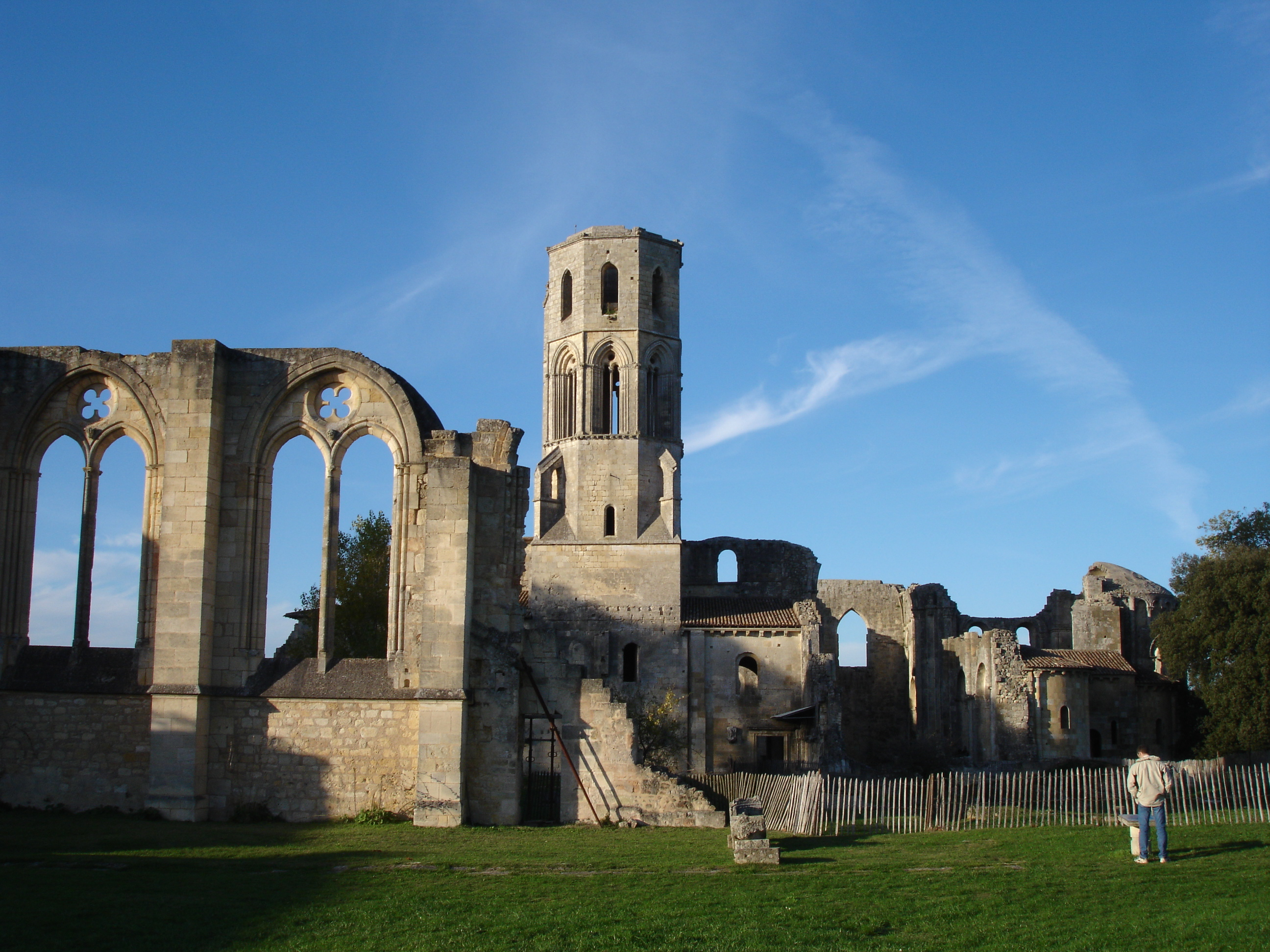
Abbey entrance

On the spot known as Hauteville, halfway between the Garonne and the Dordogne, Gerald of Sauve-Majeure founded the abbey of Grande-Sauve in 1079, of which he was also the first abbot. Its name refers to the Silva Major, the great forest that then occupied the whole region known as the Vignoble de l'Entre-Deux-Mers ("vineyard between two seas"), which was a gift to Gerald from Duke William VIII of Aquitaine.

With the support of the duke, the Pope and a large number of generous benefactors and protectors, including the kings of England, its patrons, and France, the abbey prospered and grew rapidly. It is sited on the route to Santiago de Compostela and served as a local point of departure for pilgrims. Abbot Gerald was buried there at his death in 1095 and Pope Celestine III canonised him in 1197. The present church was consecrated in 1231.

Grande-Sauve Abbey had a monastic life governed by the Rule of St. Benedict and based on that of Cluny, although it did not belong to the Cluniac Order. In the Middle Ages it was a rich and powerful house and possessed 51 priories, including at Burwell in England. Eleanor of Aquitaine stayed there often. In wealth and power it rivalled the urban centre of Bordeaux. However, the abbey's wealth attracted bandits, Basques and the Navarrese, who plundered it many times. The townspeople of La Sauve also rebelled often against the rich monks.

The abbey suffered damage during the Hundred Years' War (1337 to 1453) between France and England, and although it was repaired and fortified in the 16th century, at this period the abbey's privileges and influence were contested and its economic position threatened. From this time forward it found itself in a continuing decline.

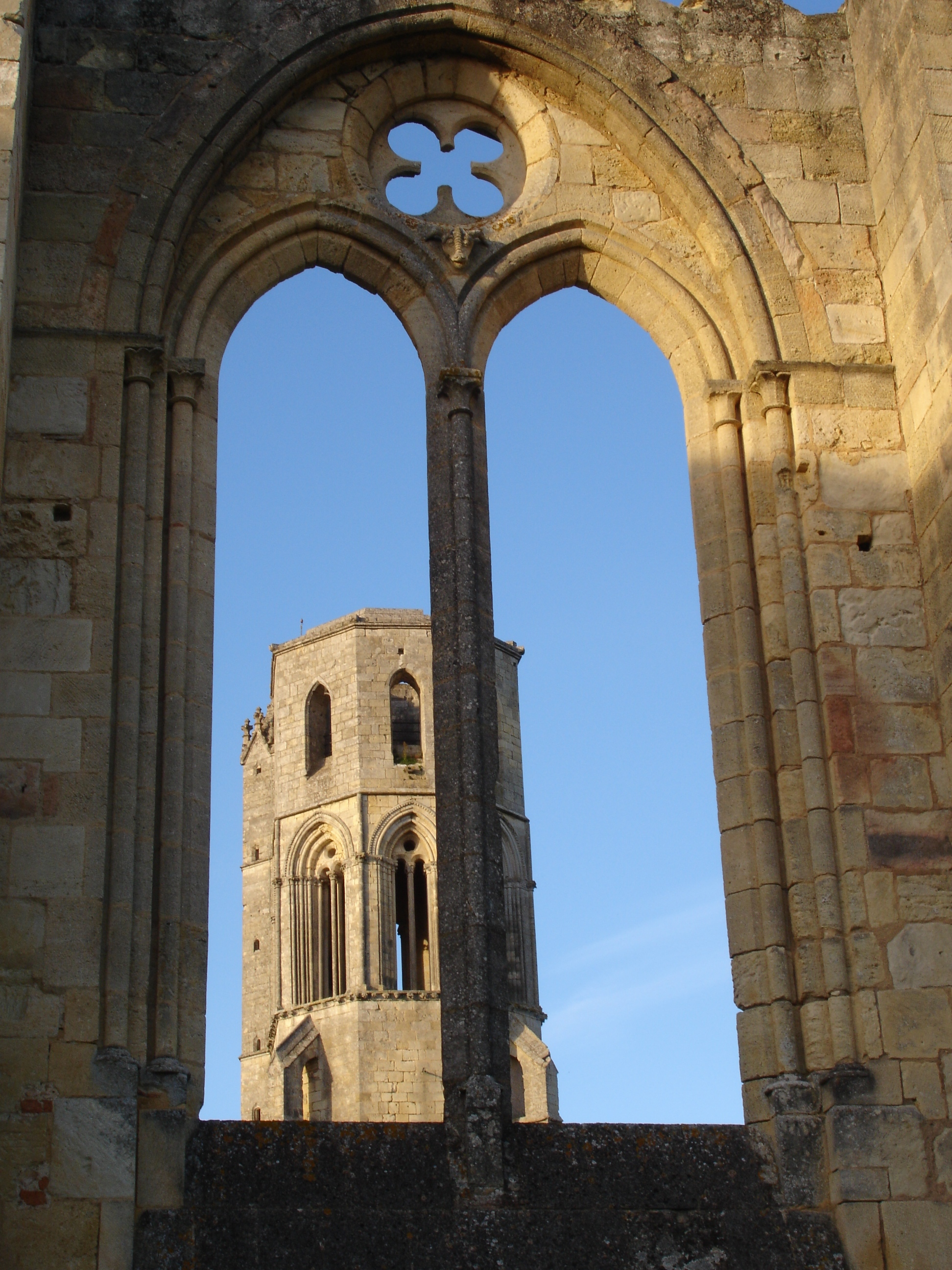
Abbey ruins

The community later joined the Congrégation des Exempts and in 1667 became a member of the Congregation of St. Maur.

In 1665 a great storm caused severe damage to the roofs of the church, the dormitories and the refectory, as well as to the belltower, which collapsed at the end of the 17th century. In 1759 the structure of the church was seriously weakened by an earthquake.

== Dissolution and after ==
During the French Revolution the abbey's assets were confiscated and dispersed. The surviving buildings were used from 1793 as a prison. The church roof fell in during 1809, and for the next forty years the remains were used as a quarry for the village of La Sauve.

In 1837 the archbishop bought up the site and had a Jesuit college built there, which was later converted into a teachers' training college. But in 1910 the school was destroyed in a fire and the site was again abandoned. Between 1914 and 1918 the remaining buildings were used as a small military hospital.

In 1960 the site was acquired by the French government and the ruins made stable. The site is now open to the public under the management of the Centre des Monuments Historiques.

== Gallery ==
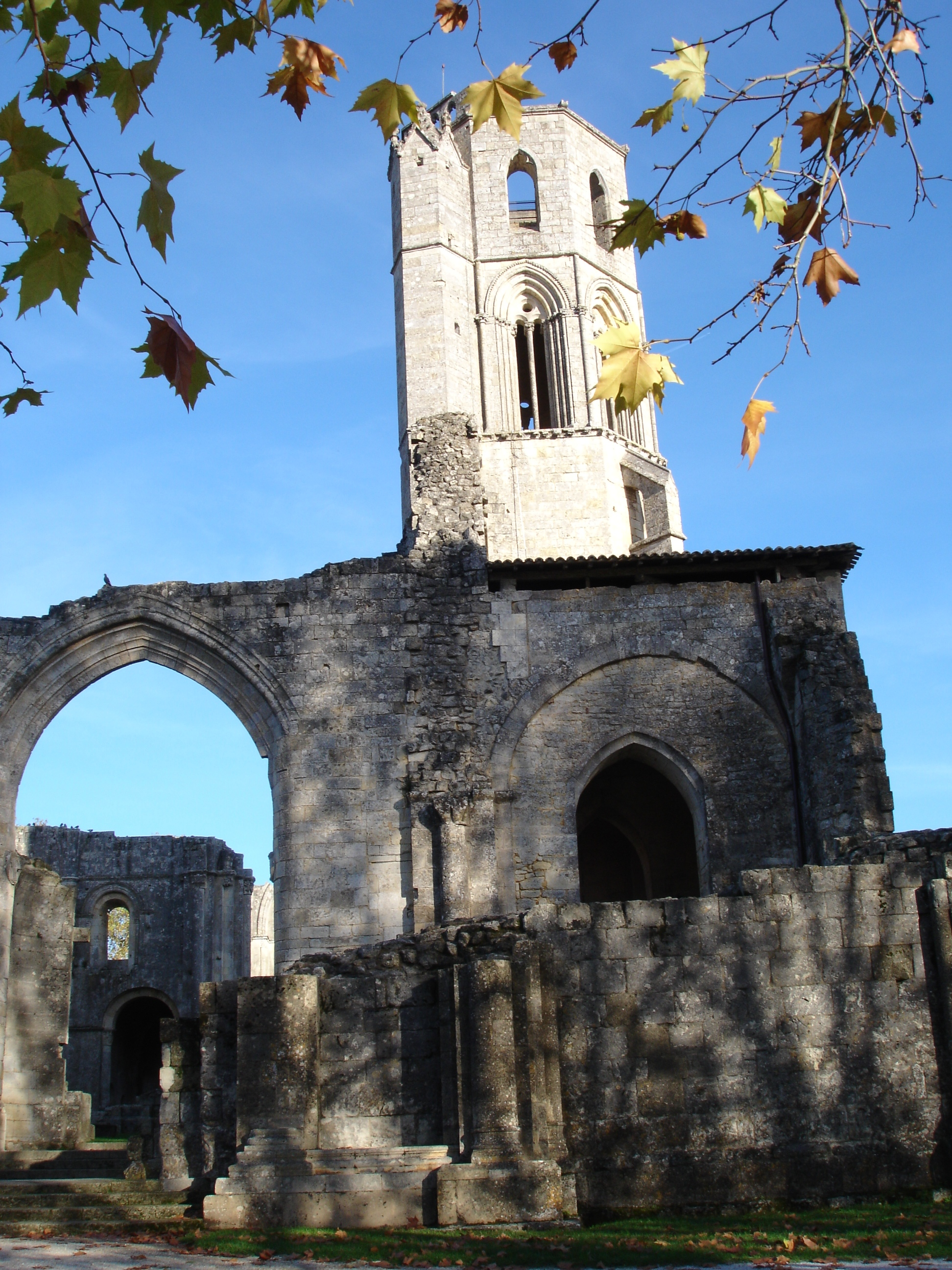

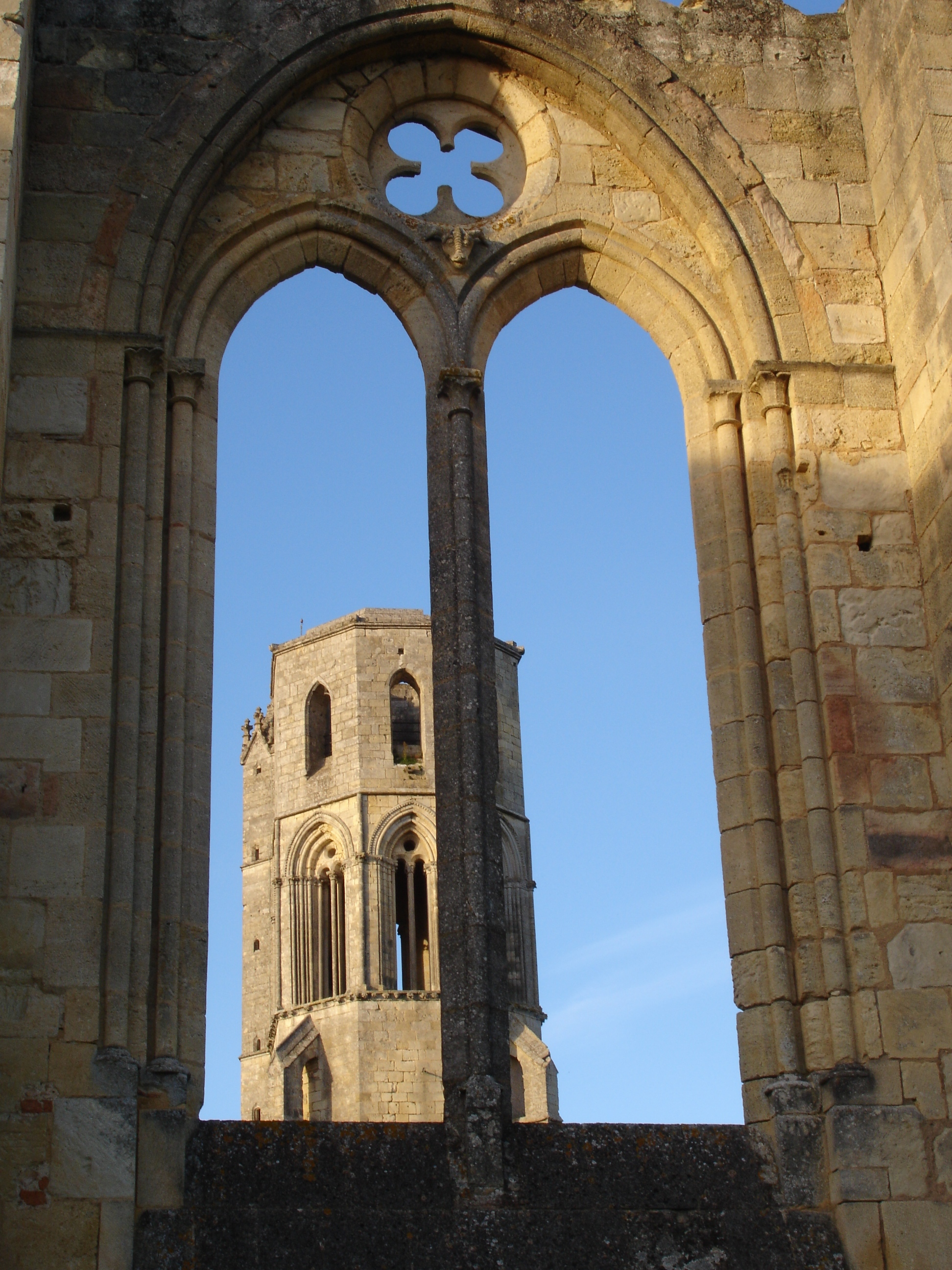

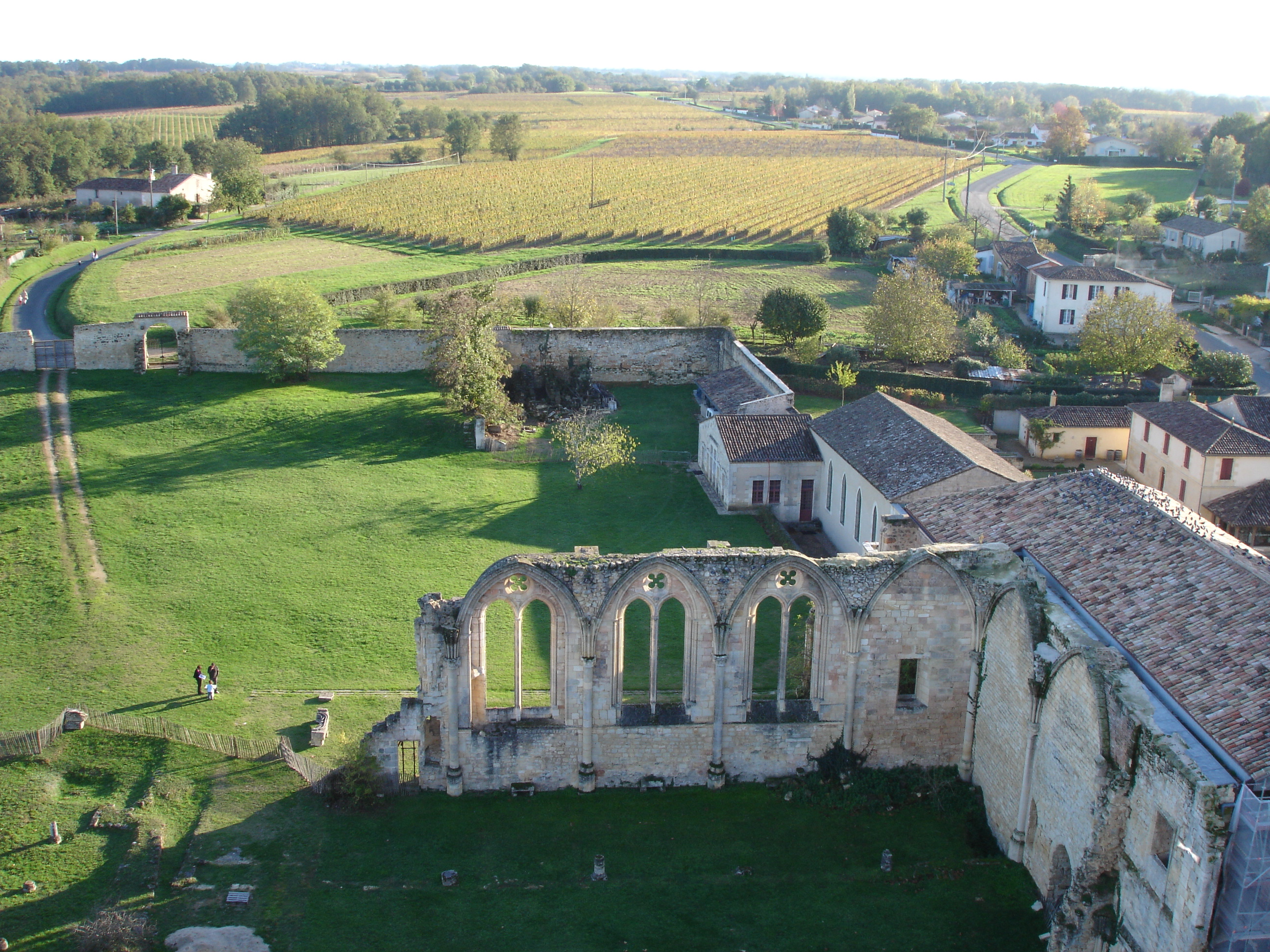
View from the tower

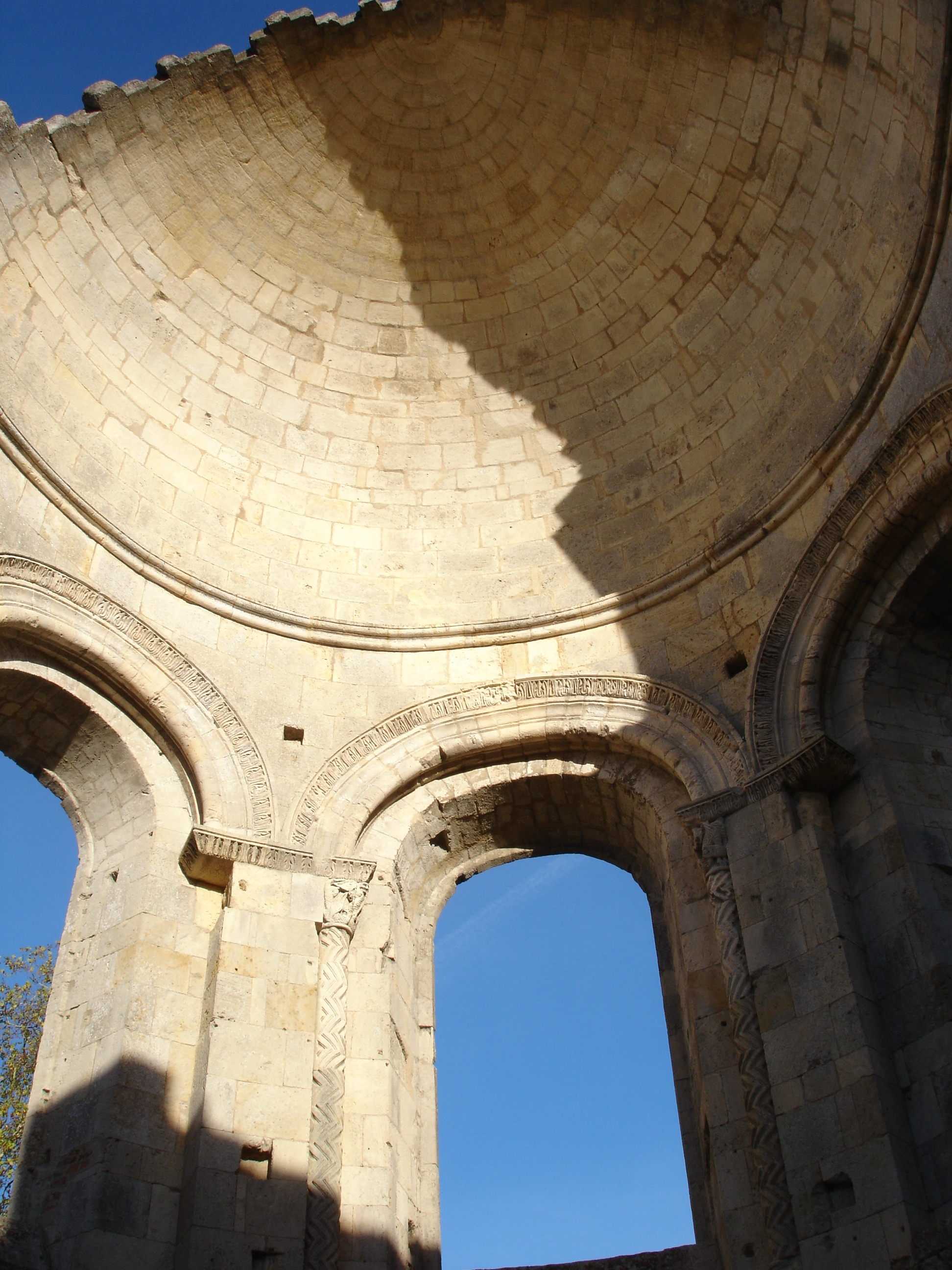
Vaulting of the nave

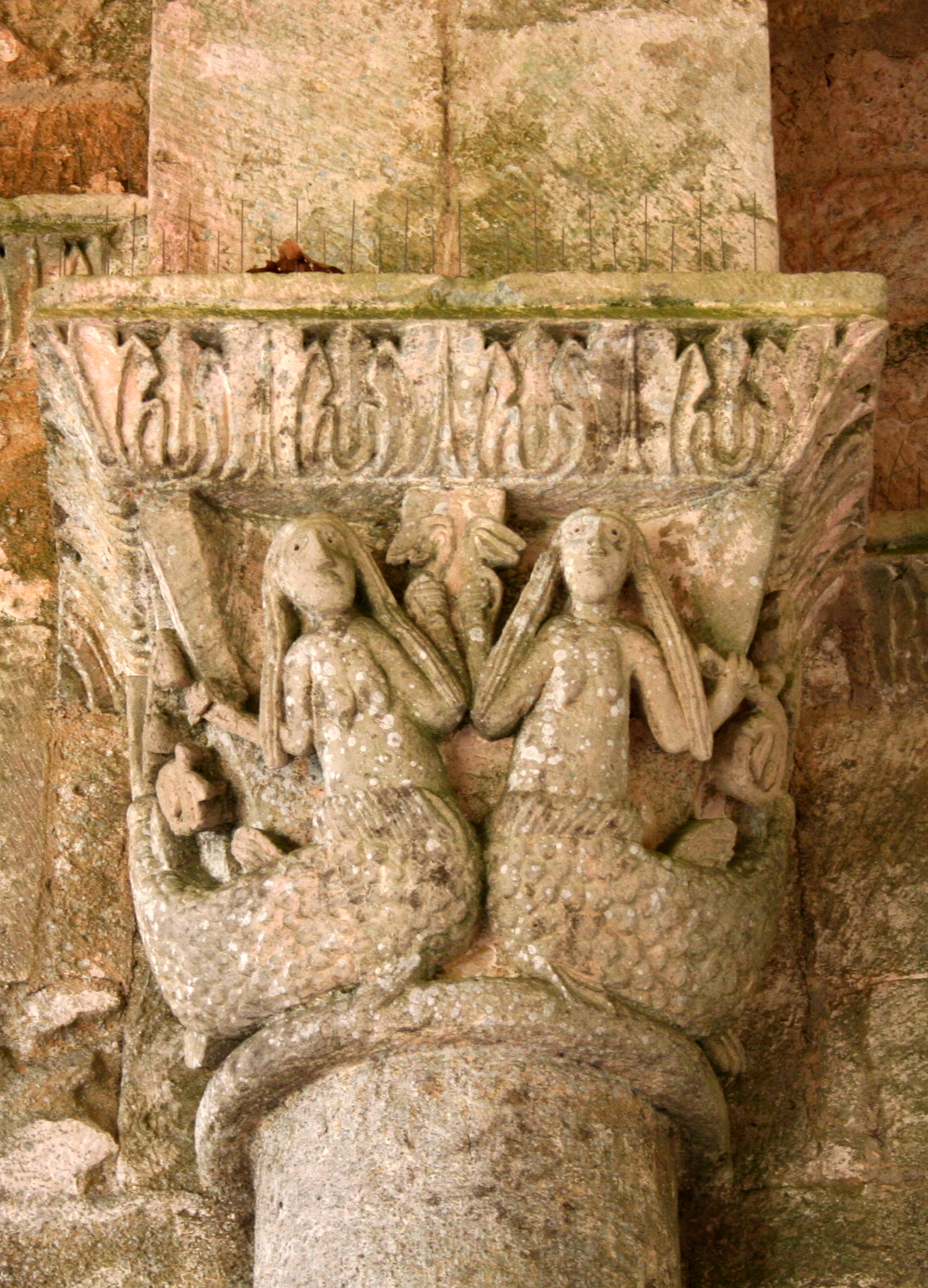
Capital with Sirens

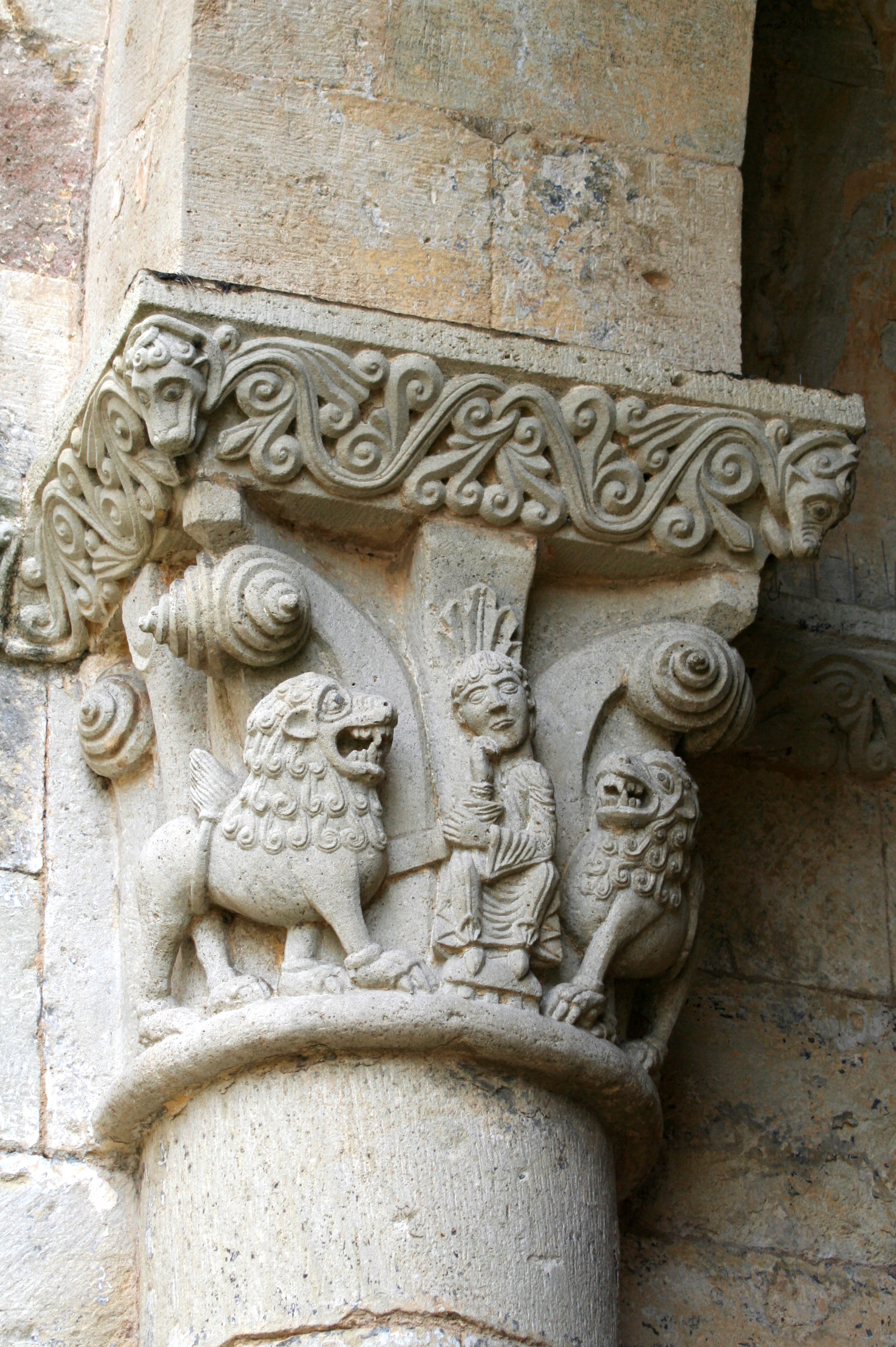
Capital with Daniel in the Lions' Den

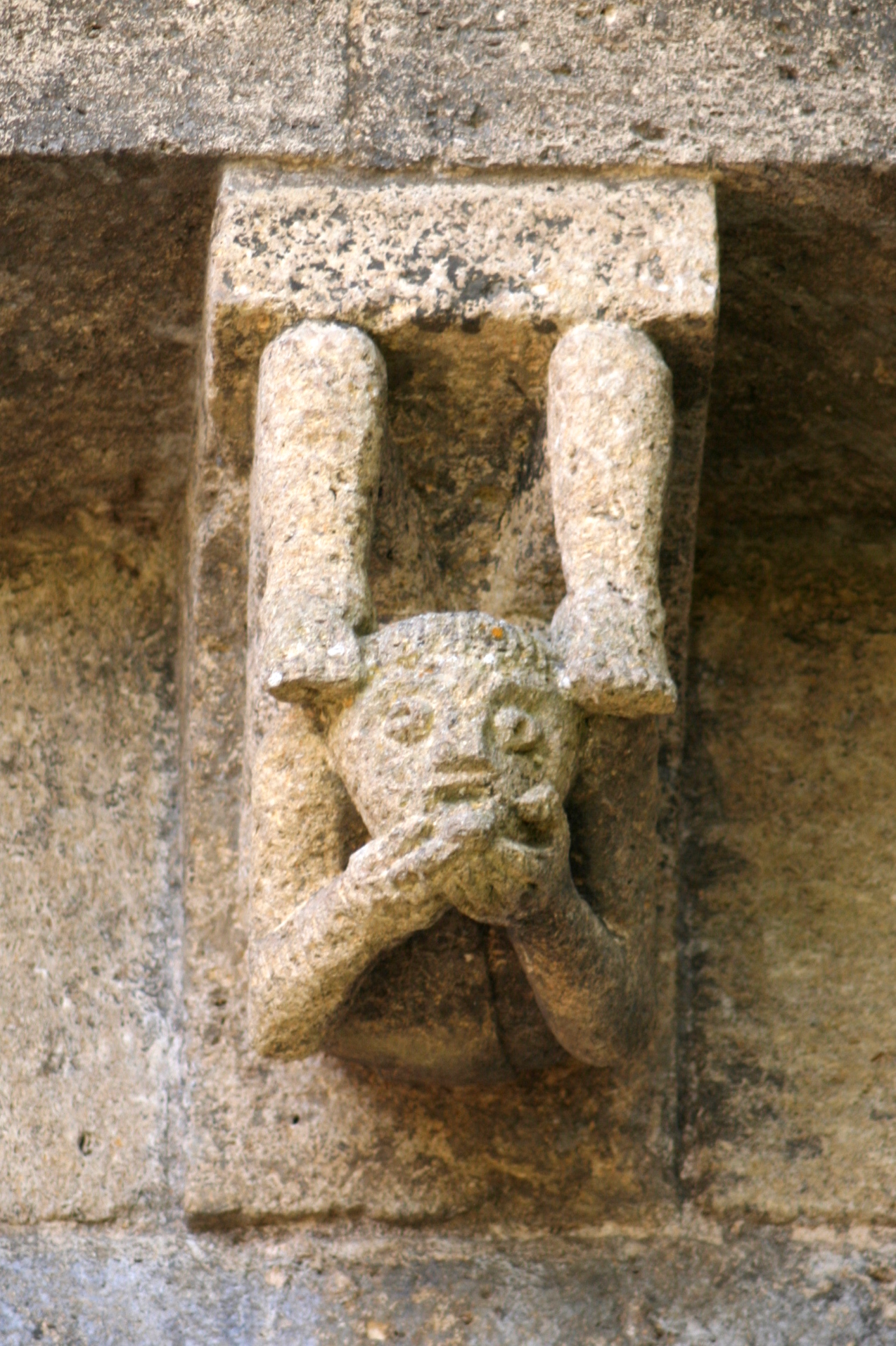
Corbel of the Chevet, Acrobat

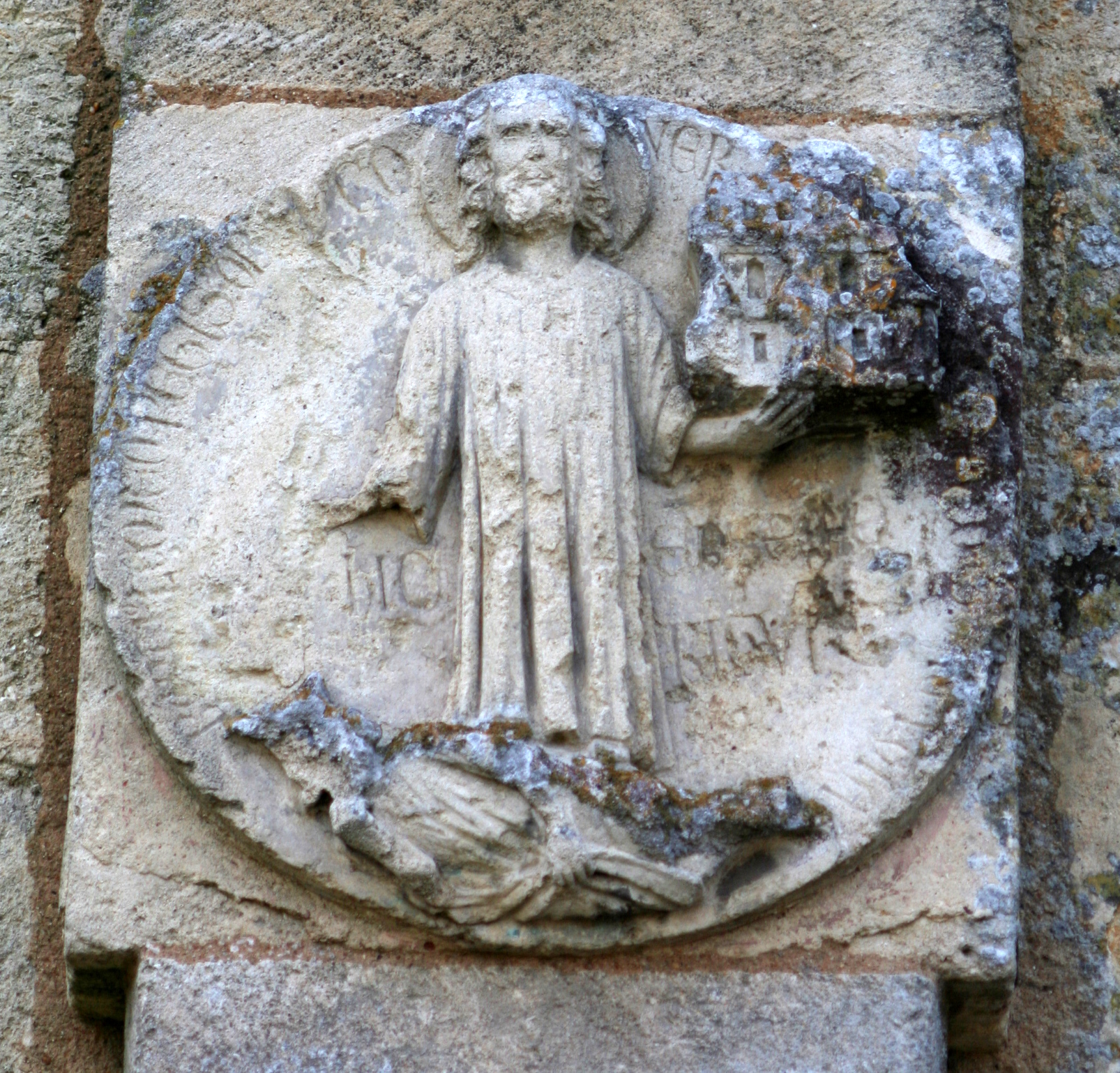
Consecration Medallion, Saint Bartholomew
